= De Wolf =

De Wolf is a Dutch surname meaning 'of the wolf'. It may be descriptive or toponymic of origin. Variations include De Wolfe, De Wulf, Dewulf and van der Wolf. People with these surnames include:

== People with the surname ==
De Wolf

- Cees de Wolf (1945–2011), Dutch footballer
- Cornelis de Wolf (1880–1935), Dutch organist and composer
- Dirk De Wolf (born 1961), Belgian road race cyclist
- Fons De Wolf (born 1956), Belgian road race cyclist
- Henri De Wolf (1936–2023), Belgian road race cyclist
- Jacob de Wolf (1630–1685), Dutch painter
- James De Wolf (1764–1837), American privateer, slaver and US Senator from Rhode Island
- John de Wolf (born 1962), Dutch footballer
- John Anthony St. Etienne de Wolf (1931–2003), Canadian journalist, economist and politician
- Karel De Wolf (1952–2011), Belgian composer, conductor and musician
- Ortwin De Wolf (born 1997), Belgian footballer
- Michel De Wolf (born 1958), Belgian footballer
- Nico de Wolf (1887–1967), Dutch footballer
- Piet de Wolf (1921–2013), Dutch footballer
- Richard Crosby De Wolf (1875–1947), American copyright law scholar
- Steve De Wolf (born 1975), Belgian road race cyclist

DeWolf

- Benjamin DeWolf (1744–1819), Nova Scotian politician and businessman
- Benjamin DeWolf (died after 1836), Nova Scotian merchant and politician
- Elisha DeWolf (1756–1837), Nova Scotian judge and politician
- Elisha DeWolf Jr. (1801–1850), Nova Scotian politician
- Harry DeWolf (1903–2000), Canadian Vice Admiral
- James De Wolf (1764–1837), United States Senator from Rhode Island
- James Madison DeWolf (1843–1876), American military officer
- James Ratchford DeWolf (1787–1855), Nova Scotian businessman and politician
- Jamie DeWolf (born 1979), American slam poet and spoken word comedian
- John DeWolf (1779–1872), American maritime fur trader and businessman
- Loran DeWolf (1754 – after 1818), Nova Scotian politician
- Nick DeWolf (1928–2006), co-founder of Teradyne
- Ronald DeWolf (1934–1991), L. Ron Hubbard's son
- Thomas Andrew Strange DeWolf (1795–1878), Nova Scotian businessman and politician
- Wallace Leroy DeWolf (1854–1930), American businessman and artist

De Wolfe

- Billy De Wolfe (1907–1974), American character actor
- Elsie de Wolfe (1859–1950), American actress and interior decorator
- Margaret De Wolfe (1881–1956), English stage and film actress
- Meyer de Wolfe (1887–1964), Dutch-born composer and conductor, founder of De Wolfe Music
- Roland De Wolfe (born 1979), English poker player

DeWolfe

- Barbara DeWolfe (1912–2008), American ornithologist
- Chris DeWolfe (born 1966), American entrepreneur
- James P. deWolfe (1896–1966), American Episcopal bishop

De Wolff

- Arjen de Wolff (born 1969), Dutch politician and human rights activist
- Bernard de Wolff (born 1955), Dutch painter
- Charles de Wolff (1932–2011), Dutch organist and conductor
- Charles Esmond de Wolff (1893–1986), British Army officer
- Francis de Wolff (1913–1984), English character actor
- Leon de Wolff (1948–2014), Dutch journalist, media consultant and academic
- Riem de Wolff (1943–2017), Indo-Dutch pop musician, brother of Ruud
- Ruud de Wolff (1941–2000), Indo-Dutch pop musician, brother of Riem
- Salomon de Wolff (1878–1960), Dutch economist and politician

De Wulf

- Frank De Wulf (born 1968), Belgian DJ
- Jimmy De Wulf (born 1980), Belgian footballer
- Maurice De Wulf (born 1980), Belgian philosopher

Dewulf

- Bernard Dewulf (1960–2021), Belgian poet and journalist
- Filip Dewulf (born 1972), Belgian tennis player
- Jeroen Dewulf (born 1972), Belgian scholar
- Noureen Dewulf (born 1984), American actress
- Stan Dewulf (born 1997), Belgian cyclist

== Fictional characters ==
- Bor de Wolf, a character from the Dutch children's television series Fabeltjeskrant
- Jean DeWolff, police detective in the Spider-Man comic books

== As a given or middle name ==
- Julia de Wolf Gibbs (1866–1952), American author and craftsman
- DeWolf Hopper (1858–1935), American actor, singer, comedian, and theatrical producer
- M. A. De Wolfe Howe (1864–1960), American editor and author.
- Mark Antony De Wolfe Howe (1808–1895), American Episcopal bishop
- Alice De Wolf Kellogg (1862–1900), American painter
- James De Wolf Perry (1871–1947) was an American Episcopal clergyman and prelate
- Leonard Percy de Wolfe Tilley (1870–1947), Canadian lawyer and Premier of New Brunswick
- Henry DeWolf Smyth (1898–1986), American physicist, diplomat, and bureaucrat

Andy DeWolfe farmer of small hay bales

== See also ==
- DeWolf (disambiguation)
- DeWolf family
- Dewolfe
- De Wolfe
- De Wolfe Music - British production music company, originator of library music.
- Wolf (name)
- Wolfe (surname)
- Wulf, common Germanic name element
