= Dewolfe =

DeWolfe is a surname. Notable people with the surname include:

- Gordon Dewolfe Barss (1916–2010), Baptist missionary who served in India during 1939–1980 through the Canadian Baptist Ministries
- Alfred B. DeWolfe (1895–1954), Canadian politician
- Barbara DeWolfe (1912–2008), American ornithologist, pioneering in studies of avian life history and physiology, especially the white-crowned sparrow
- Chris DeWolfe (born 1966), American entrepreneur and the former CEO and co-founder of Myspace (along with Tom Anderson)
- Florence Mabel Kling DeWolfe (1860–1924), the First Lady of the United States from 1921 to 1923 as the wife of President Warren G. Harding
- James DeWolfe (born 1949), former political figure in Nova Scotia, Canada
- Marshall Eugene DeWolfe (1880–1915), the only child of future First Lady Florence Harding and her first husband, Henry Athenton "Pete" DeWolfe
- DeWolfe Miller III (United States Navy), Vice Admiral in the United States Navy and current Commander, Naval Air Forces
- James P. deWolfe (1896–1966), the fourth bishop of the Episcopal Diocese of Long Island

== See also ==
- DeWolf (disambiguation)
- DeWolf family
- De Wolf
- De Wolfe
- De Wolfe Music - British production music company, originator of library music.
- Wolf (name)
- Wolfe (surname)
- Wulf, common Germanic name element
