= De Wolfe =

De Wolfe, DeWolfe, or de Volfe is a surname.

== People ==
- Barbara DeWolfe (1912–2008), American ornithologist
- Billy De Wolfe (1907–1974), American actor
- Chris DeWolfe (born 1966), American entrepreneur
- Elsie de Wolfe (1859–1950), American actress, interior decorator, and society figure
- Harry DeWolf (1903–2000), Canadian naval officer during the Second World War
- James P. deWolfe (1896–1966), American Episcopal priest and bishop
- Roland De Wolfe (born 1979), British professional poker player

== See also ==
- DeWolf (disambiguation)
- DeWolf family
- De Wolf
- Dewolfe
- De Wolfe Music - British production music company, originator of library music.
- Wolf (name)
- Wolfe (surname)
- Wulf, common Germanic name element
