= James Ratchford DeWolf =

Canadian political figure (1787–1855)

James Ratchford DeWolf (September 14, 1787 – June 10, 1855) was a merchant and political figure in Nova Scotia. He represented Liverpool township from 1820 to 1830 and Queens County from 1830 to 1836 and from 1840 to 1843 in the Nova Scotia House of Assembly.

He was born in Horton (later Wolfville, Nova Scotia), the son of Elisha DeWolf and Margaret Ratchford. In 1810, he moved to Liverpool, where he married Elizabeth, the daughter of Colonel Joseph Freeman. He established a company there with his father-in-law and two other partners. From 1825 to 1840, he operated his own business. He died in Liverpool in 1855.

His brothers Thomas Andrew Strange and Elisha also served as members of the provincial assembly.

== See also ==
- DeWolf family
