= Benjamin DeWolf =

Benjamin DeWolf may refer to:

- Benjamin DeWolf (politician) (1744–1819), Nova Scotian politician
- Benjamin DeWolf (merchant) (dead after 1836), Nova Scotian politician and merchant
