= Daniel Dulany Addison =

American clergyman and writer (1863–1936)

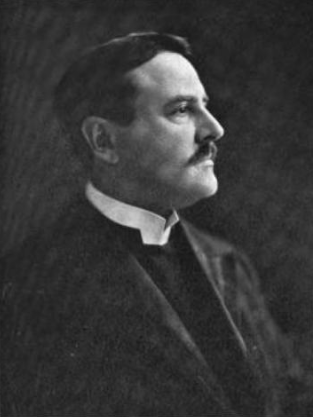
- Portrait of Daniel Dulany Addison
- Born: March 11, 1863; Wheeling, West Virginia, US
- Died: March 27, 1936 (aged 73); Brookline, Massachusetts, US
- Resting place: Evergreen Cemetery; Marion, Massachusetts
- Education: Union College; Episcopal Theological School
- Occupation(s): Clergyman, writer
- Spouse: Julia de Wolf Gibbs (m. 1889)

Daniel Dulany Addison (March 11, 1863 – March 27, 1936) was an American clergyman and writer.

== Early years ==
Addison was born on March 11, 1863, in Wheeling, West Virginia, to Thomas Grafton (1832–1896) and Maria Eliason (Addison) Addison (1836–1901), grandson of Daniel Dulany and Louise (Gordon) Addison, great-grandson of Thomas and Henrietta (Paca) Addison, grandnephew of Walter Dulany Addison, and a descendant of William Paca, signer of the Declaration of Independence, and of Colonel John Addison, first ancestor in America, who was a cousin of Joseph Addison, English poet and essayist.

== Career ==
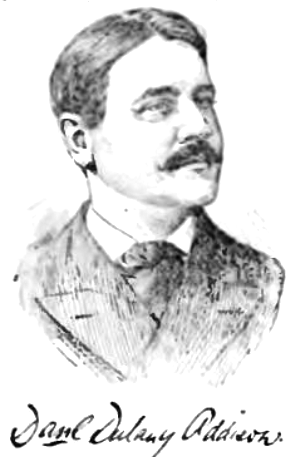
D. D. Addison's signature

He was prepared for college at Emerson Institute, Washington, D.C. He graduated from Union College in 1883, then studied at the Episcopal Theological School at Cambridge, Massachusetts, where graduated in 1886. He was ordained to the priesthood, becoming assistant minister of Christ Church, Springfield, Massachusetts, from 1886 to 1889.

Addison was married on February 20, 1889, in Beverly, Massachusetts, to Julia de Wolf Gibbs (1866–1952) an American writer. He became rector of St. Peter's church at Beverly, Massachusetts, from 1889 to 1895, when started his service as rector of All Saints church at Brookline, Massachusetts.

== Last years ==
A member of many church societies, he gave special attention to conditions in Liberia. He was made a trustee of the College of Monrovia and in 1904 was knighted by the government of Liberia in recognition of his services.

He died in Brookline, Massachusetts, on March 27, 1936. He was buried in Evergreen Cemetery at Marion, Massachusetts.

== Bibliography ==
Addison wrote articles for the 1911 Encyclopædia Britannica, these articles are designated by the initials "D. D. A."

Among his published writings are:

- New England Town in the Civil War, (1890)
- Phillips Brooks, (1892)
- Lucy Larcom, Life, Letters, and Diary, (1894)
- All Saints Church, Brookline, (1895)
- The Life and Times of Edward Bass, First Bishop of Massachusetts, 1726-1803, (1897)
- The Clergy in American Life and Letters, (1899)
- The Episcopalians, (1904)
