= Loran DeWolf =

Canadian politician

Loran DeWolf (April 7, 1754 – after 1818) was a political figure in Nova Scotia. He represented Windsor Township in the Nova Scotia House of Assembly from 1811 to 1818.

He was born in Connecticut, the son of Nathan DeWolf and Lydia Kirtland, and came to Nova Scotia in the 1760s with his family. DeWolf married Mary Fox. DeWolf was granted leave of absence due to illness in March 1818.

His brother Elisha also served as a member of the provincial assembly. His son Benjamin later represented Hants County in the provincial assembly.

== See also ==
- DeWolf family
