= Mark Anthony DeWolf =

American merchant and slave trader (1726–1793)

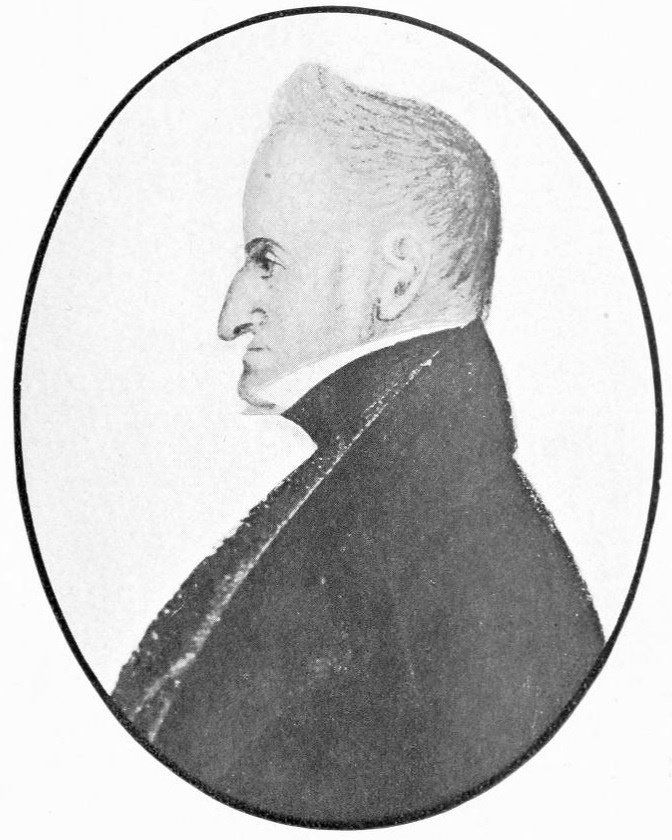
- 1902 portrait
- Born: November 8, 1726; Guadeloupe, French West Indies
- Died: November 9, 1793 (aged 67); Bristol, Rhode Island
- Occupations: Merchant, slave trader

Mark Anthony DeWolf (also spelled D'Wolf (Note: The name was occasionally spelled with the French contraction due to his education in Guadeloupe, French West Indies.) or deWolfe; November 8, 1726 – November 9, 1793) was an American merchant and slave trader. He is known for his role in the Atlantic slave trade and was an early member of the DeWolf family of Bristol, Rhode Island, which became one of the most prominent slave-trading families in American history.

== Biography ==
Born on November 8, 1726, in the French colony of Guadeloupe, Mark Anthony DeWolf was the second son of Charles DeWolf and Margaret DeWolf (née Potter). His father, born in Lyme, Connecticut, in 1695, immigrated to Guadeloupe in 1717, where he remained for the rest of his life.

DeWolf received formal education in a French school and was fluent in several languages. At the age of 17, he moved from Guadeloupe to the United States, having been hired as a deckhand on a slave-trading vessel owned by Simeon Potter. In 1744, shortly after arriving in the U.S., he married Potter's sister, Abigail. Soon after, he joined Potter on board the privateer Prince Charles of Lorraine to participate in King George's War in the West Indies.

DeWolf settled in Bristol, Rhode Island, but following an attack on the town by British and Hessian forces in 1778, during which his house was burned, he relocated his family to a farm in Swansea, Massachusetts. He did not return to Bristol until shortly before his death on September 17, 1793.

== The DeWolf family ==
DeWolf was the 4th generation of Balthazar DeWolf of Lyme, Connecticut.

DeWolf married Abigail Potter of Bristol, Rhode Island, on 26 August 1744. Among his eight sons and seven daughters, Senator James DeWolf was the twelfth child. James DeWolf made most of his fortune in the slave trade. In total, the DeWolf family is believed to have transported more than 11,000 slaves to the United States before the African slave trade was banned in 1808. General George DeWolf, the builder of Linden Place, was Mark Anthony DeWolf's grandson through his son Major Charles DeWolf.
