= Linden Place =

Mansion in Bristol, Rhode Island

Coordinates: 41.6714°N 71.2762°W

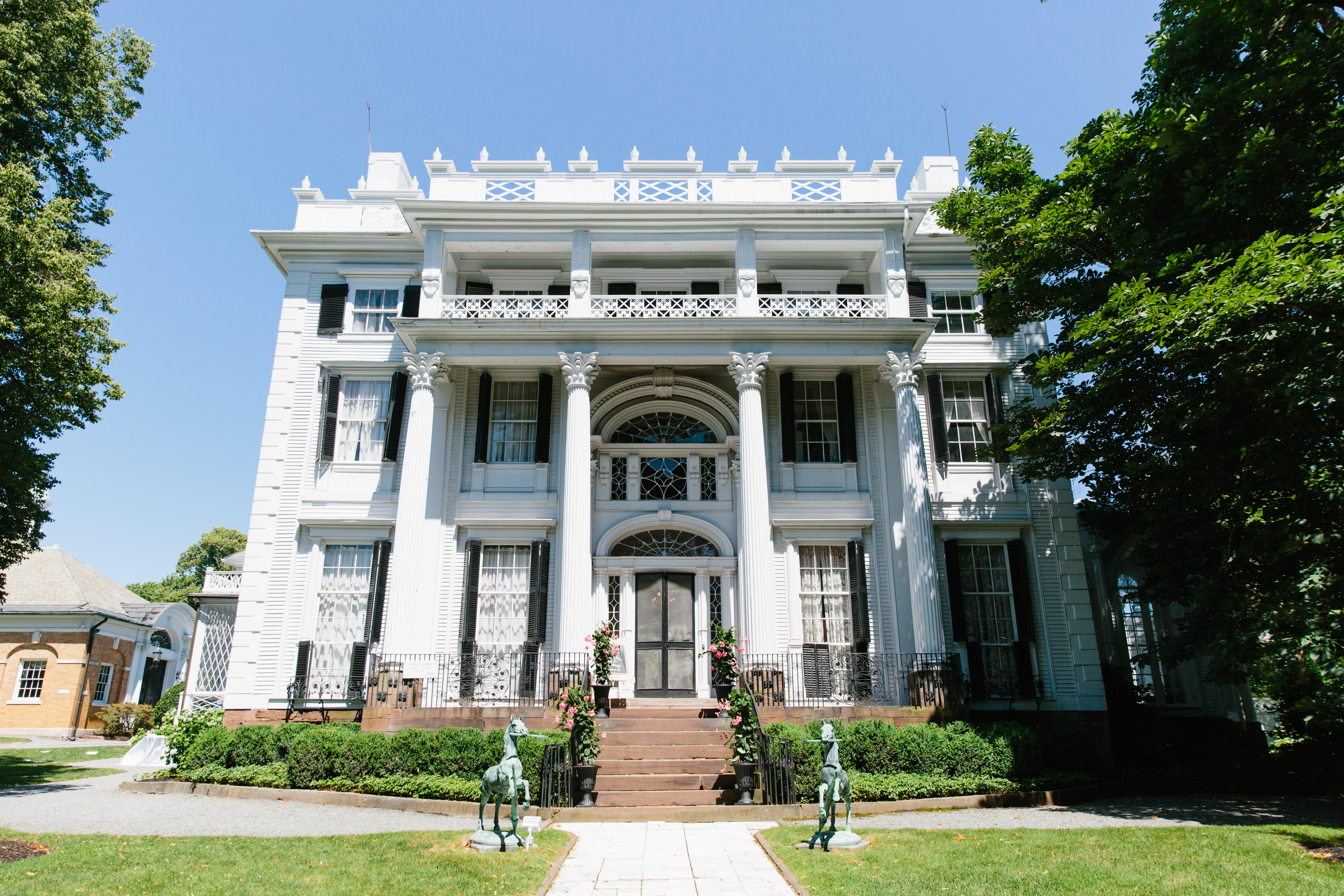
Linden Place in 2017

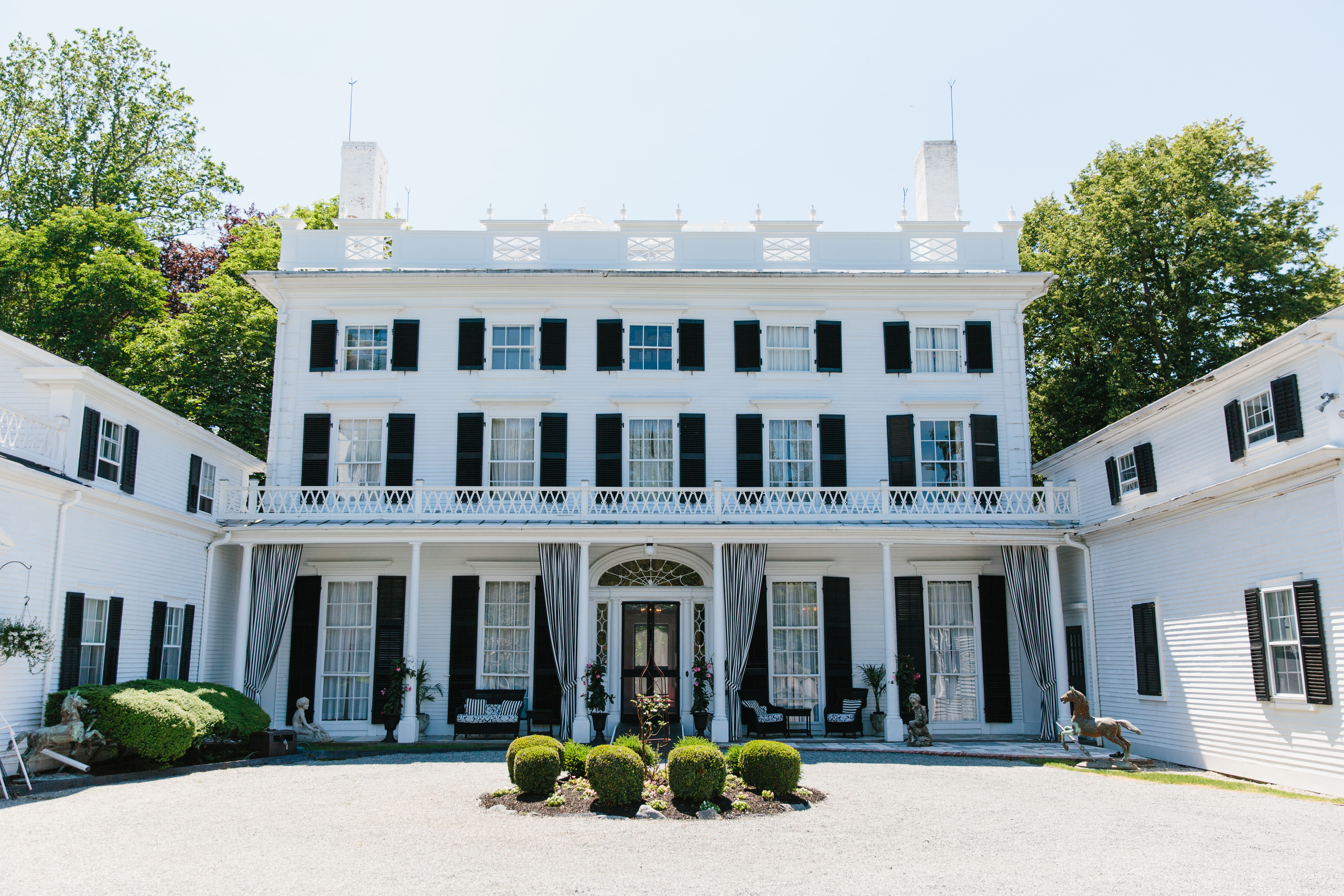
Rear of Linden Place

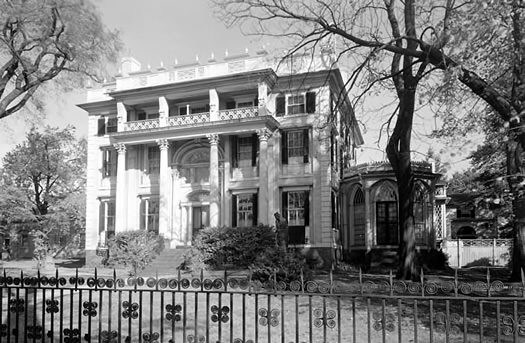
Scanned image from the Friends of Linden Place archives

Linden Place is a Federal-style mansion located in Bristol, Rhode Island. It was built in 1810 by slave trader, merchant, privateer and ship owner General George DeWolf and was designed by architect, Russell Warren. The mansion now operates as a historic house museum.

Built in the Robert Adam–inspired Federal style, popular in the early decades of the new American nation, Linden Place magnificently reflects the prosperity of the DeWolf slave trading merchant princes and the exquisite Adamesque Federal taste inspired by the architecture of ancient Greece and Rome. Linden Place is one of the best examples of Federal architecture in New England, from the magnificent Palladian windows to the fluted Corinthian columns, which gracefully flank the front entrance to the mansion. Also of architectural significance are the later added Gothic conservatory and four-story spiral staircase.

Tour highlights include tales of DeWolf family exploits, from their privateering and slave trading to their financial ruin and triumphant return to prosperity during Victorian times. Residents included family members Samuel Pomeroy Colt, founder of United States Rubber, now Uniroyal, his mother Theodora DeWolf Colt, who as Madam Colt ran Bristol Society from Linden Place as if she were Queen Victoria, and the great actress Ethel Barrymore who married in to this most prominent of American families. The mansion sits on 1.8 acres of sculpture-filled gardens where there are Greek bronzes and an 18th-century gazebo.

Today the estate is sponsored by the non-profit Friends of Linden Place, which was created in 1989, based on the urgent need to save the magnificent 1810 DeWolf mansion from destruction or development. Due to the formidable drive of the earliest volunteers, the “crown jewel” of Bristol’s historic waterfront district was saved and is today maintained through visitation, fundraisers, grants and memberships.

The mansion was prominently featured in Traces of the Trade: A Story from the Deep North, a 2008 film documentary about the DeWolf family and the legacy of the slave trade in the North of the United States. It was used as a filming location for the 1974 movie The Great Gatsby.

The Bristol Art Museum occupies the former carriage house at Linden Place, with its entrance located at 10 Wardwell Street, Bristol, RI.

== Prominent residents ==
- Samuel P. Colt, politician, industrialist (died at Linden Place in 1921)
- Ethel Barrymore, actress
- Ethel Colt Miglietta, daughter of Ethel Barrymore and Russell Colt, singer

== See also ==
- DeWolf family
