= Bernard Dewulf =

Belgian poet and journalist (1960–2021)

- Born: 30 January 1960; Brussels, Belgium
- Died: 23 December 2021 (aged 61); Antwerp, Belgium
- Occupations: Poet; Journalist

Bernard Dewulf (30 January 1960 – 23 December 2021) was a Belgian poet and journalist.

Dewulf died in Antwerp on 23 December 2021, at the age of 61.

== Publications ==
- Waar de egel gaat (1995)
- Bijlichtingen. Kijken naar schilders (2001)
- De wijnjaren (2002)
- Blauwziek (2006)
- Loerhoek (2006)
- Naderingen. Kijken & zoeken naar schilders (2007)
- De wijdere blik (2008)
- Zeedrift (2009)
- Kleine dagen (2009)
- Trekvogels in de mist (2012)
- Verstrooiingen (2012)
- Stadsgedichten (2014)
- Toewijdingen. Verzamelde beschouwingen (2014)
- Late dagen (2016)
- Carrousel (2017)
- Naar het gras (2018)
- Tuimelingen (2020)
