= Arjen de Wolff =

Arjen de Wolff (born 1969 in the Netherlands) is the executive director of Radio Zamaneh in Amsterdam.

== Political career and activities ==
In the 1990s, De Wolff served as a civic member of the Democrats 66 political group on the Amsterdam-Zuid District Council and the Municipal Council of the City of Amsterdam.

From 1994 to 1998, De Wolff was a political counsel to the Amsterdam Aldermen for Arts & Culture and Media.

In 2004, Arjen de Wolff moved back to the Netherlands from Curaçao to become secretary-general of the parliamentary group of Democrats 66 in the Dutch House of Representatives. During these years, Democrats 66 was a governing party and was faced with internal struggles over political direction and future leadership. De Wolff actively participated in a movement to establish Democrats 66 as a mainstream party in the centre-left of Dutch politics, with an emphasis on social and economic issues rather than the more traditional constitutional reform related agenda of the party.

Since the early 1990s, Arjen de Wolff has played an active role in trying to bridge the gap between centre-left parties of the Netherlands. He was a coordinator of Opschudding, a movement of dissent within Democrats 66 that later merged with Niet Nix, a social liberal current within the Dutch Labor Party (PvdA). De Wolff was a member of Democrats 66 for over twenty years, holding several political offices for that party. He gave up his membership in 2008 and in 2010, he joined the PvdA.

In 2011, Arjen de Wolff was one of the founders of a new centrist political initiative called Dag van 100, aiming to transcend the polarized political debate of the time and bring together thinkers and practitioners from both the centre-left and the centre-right of the Dutch political spectrum. According to Dutch daily newspaper Het Parool, the initiative aimed to participate in the municipal elections. Dutch political weekly magazine Elsevier highlighted the disappointment of the founders in the current political parties.

== International career in democracy, governance and media development ==
In 2008 and 2009, Arjen de Wolff worked in different parts of the Caucasus as director for the National Democratic Institute for International Affairs (NDI), overseeing programs in political party building, civil society building, Democracy and Governance development and election monitoring and assistance.

In May 2009, Arjen de Wolff was detained by police in Baku, Azerbaijan, while attempting to prevent staffers of the regional National Democratic Institute for International Affairs (NDI) representation, where De Wolff was regional director at the time, from being arrested. When police wanted to release him later in the day, De Wolff refused to leave the police station without his local staff members. They were subsequently released as well.

In the WikiLeaks dossier, known for its United States diplomatic cables leak, Arjen de Wolff is mentioned a few times, amongst others on his work in the North-Caucasus and Azerbaijan.

From 2009 to 2011, De Wolff served as country director for Internews in Iraq, where he assisted in the development of Aswat al-Iraq, the first independent Iraqi news agency, trained young journalists and citizen reporters, and assisted in reviewing Iraqi national media legislation and CMC procedures. Program activities extended to Syria, Lebanon and Jordan. He talked about his experiences in Iraq in an interview for IKON Dutch public broadcasting network

In 2011 Arjen de Wolff was appointed as the director of Persian-language Radio Zamaneh in Amsterdam. In 2012, 100 Dutch-Persians sent a letter to The Netherlands Ministry of Foreign Affairs and criticized his acts in this radio station.
