= James Madison DeWolf =

U.S. Army surgeon (1843–1876)

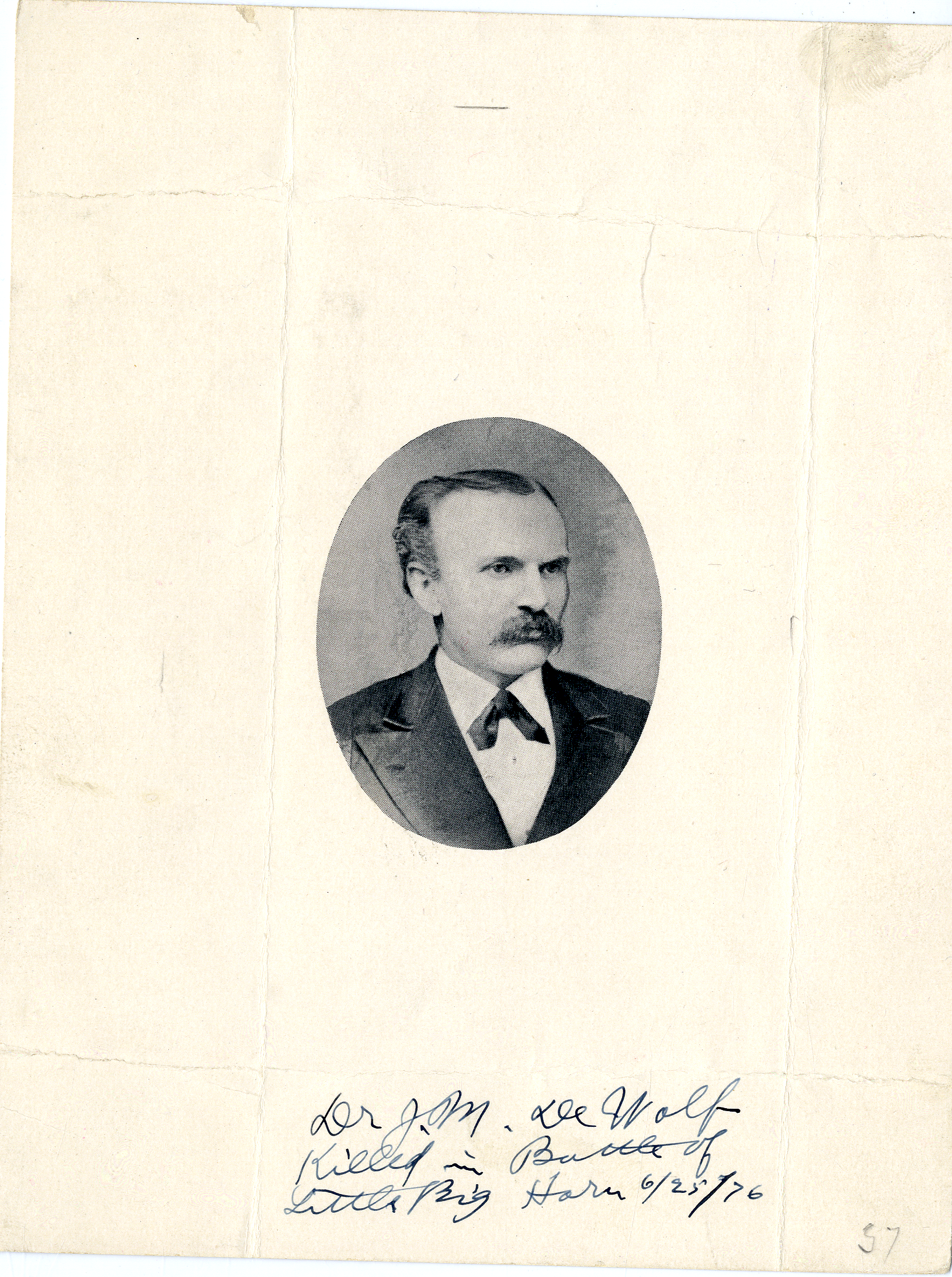
Dr. James Madison DeWolf

Dr. James Madison DeWolf (January 14, 1843 – June 25, 1876) was an acting assistant surgeon in the U.S. 7th Cavalry Regiment who was killed in the Battle of the Little Big Horn.

Born in Mehoopany in Wyoming County, Pennsylvania, DeWolf was a farmer prior to the American Civil War. In August 1861, he enlisted in the Union Army in the 1st Pennsylvania Artillery at the age of 17. He first saw combat at the First Battle of Bull Run. He was promoted to Corporal, but was severely wounded in the arm and discharged in October 1862. He re-enlisted in September 1864 in Battery A, 1st Pennsylvania Artillery, serving in that battery until his discharge on June 14, 1865.

Following the war, he became an enlisted man in the Regular Army's 14th U.S. Infantry and entered Harvard Medical School, graduating in June 1875. He became a contract surgeon later that year with the 7th Cavalry at Fort Abraham Lincoln in the Dakota Territory.

In early 1876, he was assigned to Major Marcus Reno's battalion. A letter to his wife is the only first-hand account of Reno's scouting expedition.

DeWolf was killed June 25 during Reno's retreat from the timber to "Reno Hill" at the Battle of the Little Big Horn. He and his orderly had made the difficult crossing of the buffalo ford and for some reason were going up a side path in a coulee. As DeWolf reached the top of the coulee, he was shot from his horse but survived. He was scalped next to his orderly in full view of the retreating cavalry.

He was initially buried on the battlefield near where he fell, then moved to the National Cemetery. As an officer, Dr. DeWolf's remains were exhumed and returned to his family in 1877. He was reinterred in Woodlawn Cemetery in Norwalk, Ohio.

Evan S. Connell, in Son of the Morning Star, stated that there is only one photograph known of him.
