= Julia de Wolf Gibbs =

American author and craftsman

- Born: February 24, 1866; Boston, Massachusetts, US
- Died: 1952
- Resting place: Evergreen Cemetery
- Occupation(s): Author, Craftsman
- Spouse: Daniel Dulany Addison

Julia de Wolf Gibbs (February 24, 1866 – 1952) was an American writer and craftsman.

She was born in Boston, Massachusetts, the daughter of Franklin Gibbs and Ann de Wolf Lovett, and was educated in England by a governess. Gibbs returned to Boston in 1878 where she studied art in private schools. Later she traveled to England and Italy for further training as an art student. In 1889 she was married to the clergyman Daniel Dulany Addison. Thereafter she became known as a craftsman of ornamentation, mosaics, metal work, embroideries, heraldry, and an illustrator of vellum. She was the author of multiple books, plays, songs and Christmas carols.

== Bibliography ==
- Wouldn't You Like to Know (1885)
- A False Note (1888)
- Art of the Pitti Palace (1903)
- Florestan the Troubadour (1903)
- Classic Myths in Art (1904)
- Art of the National Gallery (1905)
- The Art of the Dresden Gallery (1907)
- Arts and Crafts in the Middle Ages (1908)
- Mrs. John Vernon (1908)
- The Boston Museum of Fine Arts (1910)
- A False Note (1912)
- Blighted Buds (1912)
- The Spell of England (1912)
