= Rebecca Donovan =

American novelist

- Born: U.S.
- Occupation: Novelist
- Writing career
- Language: English
- Website: Official website

Rebecca Donovan is an American novelist. Her books have a special appeal to twenty-somethings, a market category publishers call new adult.

Donovan, who had previously worked as an events planner, began as a self-published author, but in 2012, Penguin acquired the U.K. rights to her successful "Breathing" series. In 2013 she signed a contract with the Amazon.com imprint, Skyscape Publishing. According to The Boston Globe, to celebrate her publishing contract with Amazon, Donovan "took over" the Blithewold Mansion where she planned and held a party together with friends she had worked together with at Rafanelli Events .

== Bibliography ==
=== Novels ===
- Reason to Breathe ISBN 978-1477817148 Reason to Breathe, was listed on the USA Today bestseller list in August, 2012.
- Barely Breathing ISBN 978-1477817179
- Out of Breath ISBN 978-1477817186 Out of Breath was # 4 on the list of all booksellers, nationwide the week it was published in July, 2013. It was # 6 on the young adult and children bestseller list for 2013 at Amazon.com, the nation's largest volume bookseller. Out of Breath was # 4 on the list of all booksellers, nationwide the week it was published in July, 2013. It was also published as an audio book.
- What If
