= Bristol, Rhode Island =

Town in Rhode Island, United States

- Town
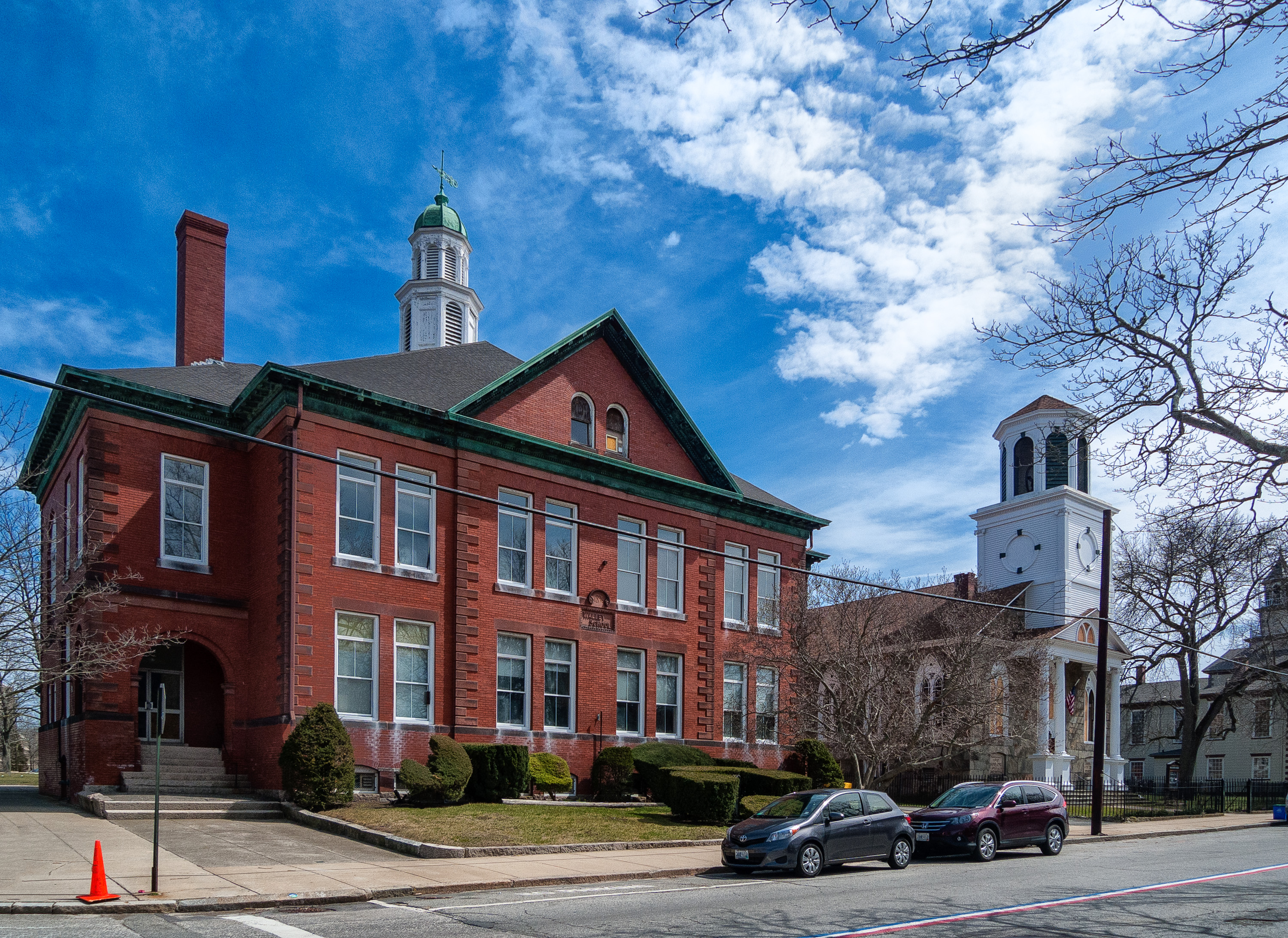
- (L–R) Walley School (1896), First Baptist Church (1814), and Bristol County Statehouse/Courthouse (1816) on the town common

- Flag Seal Logo

- Location in Bristol County and the state of Rhode Island
- Coordinates: 41.67038°N 71.27653°W
- Country: United States
- State: Rhode Island
- County: Bristol
- Settled: 1680
- Incorporated: October 28, 1681
- Annexed from Massachusetts: January 27, 1747

Government
  - Type: Mayor-council
  - Town Administrator: Steven Contente (I)

Area
  - Total: 20.6 sq mi (53.4 km^{2})
  - Land: 10.1 sq mi (26.2 km^{2})
  - Water: 10.5 sq mi (27.2 km^{2})
- Elevation: 0–131 ft (0–40 m)

Population (2020)
  - Total: 22,493
  - Density: 2,224/sq mi (858.5/km^{2})
- Time zone: UTC−5 (EST)
  - Summer (DST): UTC−4 (EDT)
- ZIP Code: 02809
- Area code: 401
- FIPS code: 44-09280
- GNIS feature ID: 1220083
- Demonym: Bristolian ("brihs-TOH-lee-an")
- Website: bristolri.gov

Bristol is a town in Bristol County, Rhode Island, United States, as well as the county seat. The population of Bristol was 22,493 at the 2020 census. It is a deep water seaport named after Bristol, England. Major industries include boat building and related marine industries, manufacturing, and tourism. The Bristol Warren Regional School District manages the unified school system for Bristol and the neighboring town of Warren. Prominent communities include Portuguese-Americans, mostly Azoreans, and Italian-Americans.

== History ==
=== Early colonization ===
Before the Pilgrims arrived in 1620, the Pokanokets occupied much of Southern New England, including Plymouth. They had previously suffered from a series of plagues which killed off large segments of their population, and their leader, the Massasoit Osamequin, befriended the early settlers. King Philip's War was a conflict between the Plymouth settlers and the Pokanokets and allied tribes, and it began in the neighboring area of Swansea, Massachusetts. Metacomet made nearby Mount Hope (a corruption of the Pokanoket word Montaup) his base of operations; he died following an ambush by Captain Benjamin Church on August 12, 1676. "Massasoit's Seat" is a rocky ledge on the mountain which was a lookout site for enemy ships on Mount Hope Bay.

After the war concluded, four Boston merchants – Stephen Burton, Nathaniel Byfield, Nathaniel Oliver, and John Walley – purchased a tract of land known as "Mount Hope Neck and Poppasquash Neck" as part of the Plymouth Colony. Other settlers included John Gorham and Richard Smith. A variant of the Indian name Metacomet is now the name of a main road in Bristol: Metacom Avenue (RI Route 136). Bristol was a town of Massachusetts until the Crown transferred it to the Rhode Island Colony in 1747.

=== Slave trade and the DeWolf family ===
The DeWolf family was among the earliest settlers of Bristol. Bristol and Rhode Island became a center of slave trading, from which it derived much of its wealth. James DeWolf, a leading slave trader, later became a United States Senator from Rhode Island. Beginning in 1769 and continuing until 1820 (over a decade after the slave trade was outlawed in the Atlantic), the DeWolf family trafficked people out of West Africa, enslaving them and bringing them to work on DeWolf-owned plantations, or selling them to be auctioned at ports in places such as Havana, Cuba and Charleston, South Carolina. Sugar and molasses from slave plantations in Cuba would be brought to Rhode Island to DeWolf-owned distilleries. By the end of 1820, the DeWolf family had trafficked and enslaved over 10,000 Africans. James DeWolf died as the second wealthiest person in the United States.

Quakers from Rhode Island were involved early in the abolition movement, although abolition was a divisive issue among Quakers, resulting in the creation of new Quaker groups. The DeWolf family, as well as Bristol's and the northern United States' participation in slavery, are featured in the 2008 documentary Traces of the Trade: A Story from the Deep North, in the 2008 companion memoir Inheriting the Trade: A Northern Family Confronts Its Legacy as the Largest Slave-Trading Dynasty in U.S. History by Thomas Norman DeWolf, and the 2014 historical study James DeWolf and the Rhode Island Slave Trade by Cynthia Mestad Johnson.

=== American Revolution ===
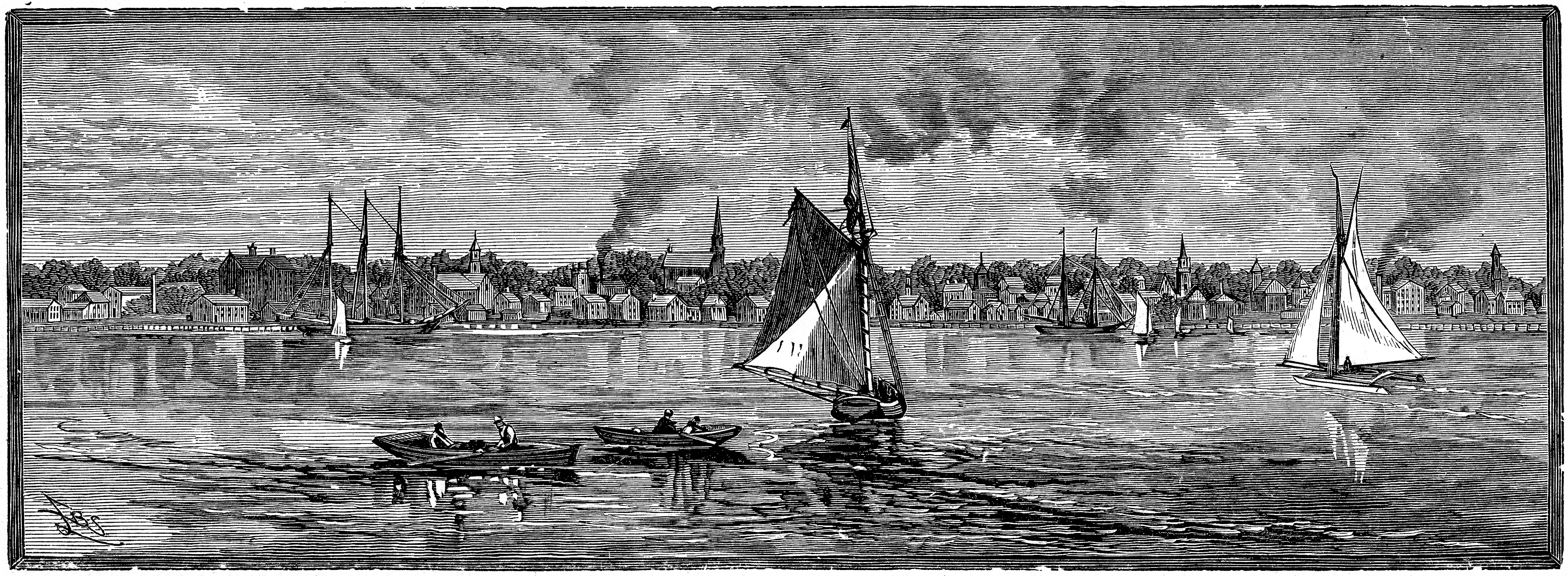
A view of Bristol RI from the harbor. 1886 engraving.

During the American Revolutionary War, the British Royal Navy bombarded Bristol twice. On October 7, 1775, a group of ships led by Captain Wallace and HMS Rose sailed into town and demanded provisions. When refused, Wallace shelled the town, causing much damage. The attack was stopped when Lieutenant Governor William Bradford rowed out to Rose to negotiate a cease-fire, but then a second attack took place on May 25, 1778. This time, 500 British and Hessian troops marched through the main street (now called Hope Street (RI Route 114)) and burned 30 barracks and houses, taking some prisoners to Newport.

=== New Goree ===
Starting in at least in 1805, a community of free Black people known as "New Goree" existed along the northern portion of Wood Street in the 19th century from Bayview Avenue to Union Street. This community disappeared by 1900. An African Methodist Episcopal church stood at 417 Wood Street, but was razed by 1898; the Bristol Sports Club currently stands on that lot. Two modest homes on Wood Street were identified in 2023 as being New Goree homes. Researchers speculate that the construction of a United States Rubber Company plant on Wood Street in 1864 may have played a role in the neighborhood's demise.

=== Other history and current day ===
Until 1854, Bristol was one of the five state capitals of Rhode Island.

Bristol is home to Roger Williams University, named for Rhode Island founder Roger Williams.

The southerly terminus of the East Bay Bike Path is located at Independence Park on Bristol Harbor. The bike path continues north to India Point Park in Providence, R.I., mostly constructed following an abandoned railroad right of way. Some of the best views of Narragansett Bay can be seen along this corridor. The construction of the East Bay Bike Path was highly contested by Bristol residents before construction because of the potential of crime, but it has become a welcome asset to the community and the anticipated crime was non-existent.

The Bristol-based Herreshoff boat company built five consecutive America's Cup Defenders between 1893 and 1920. The Colt Estate, now known as Colt State Park, was home to Samuel P. Colt, nephew of the man famous for the arms company, and founder of the United States Rubber Company, later called Uniroyal and the largest rubber company in the nation. Colt State Park lies on manicured gardens abutting the West Passage of Narragansett Bay, and is popular for its views of the waterfront and sunsets.

Bristol is the site of the National Historic Landmark Joseph Reynolds House built in 1700. The Marquis de Lafayette and his staff used the building as headquarters in 1778 during the Battle of Rhode Island.

==== Fourth of July parade ====
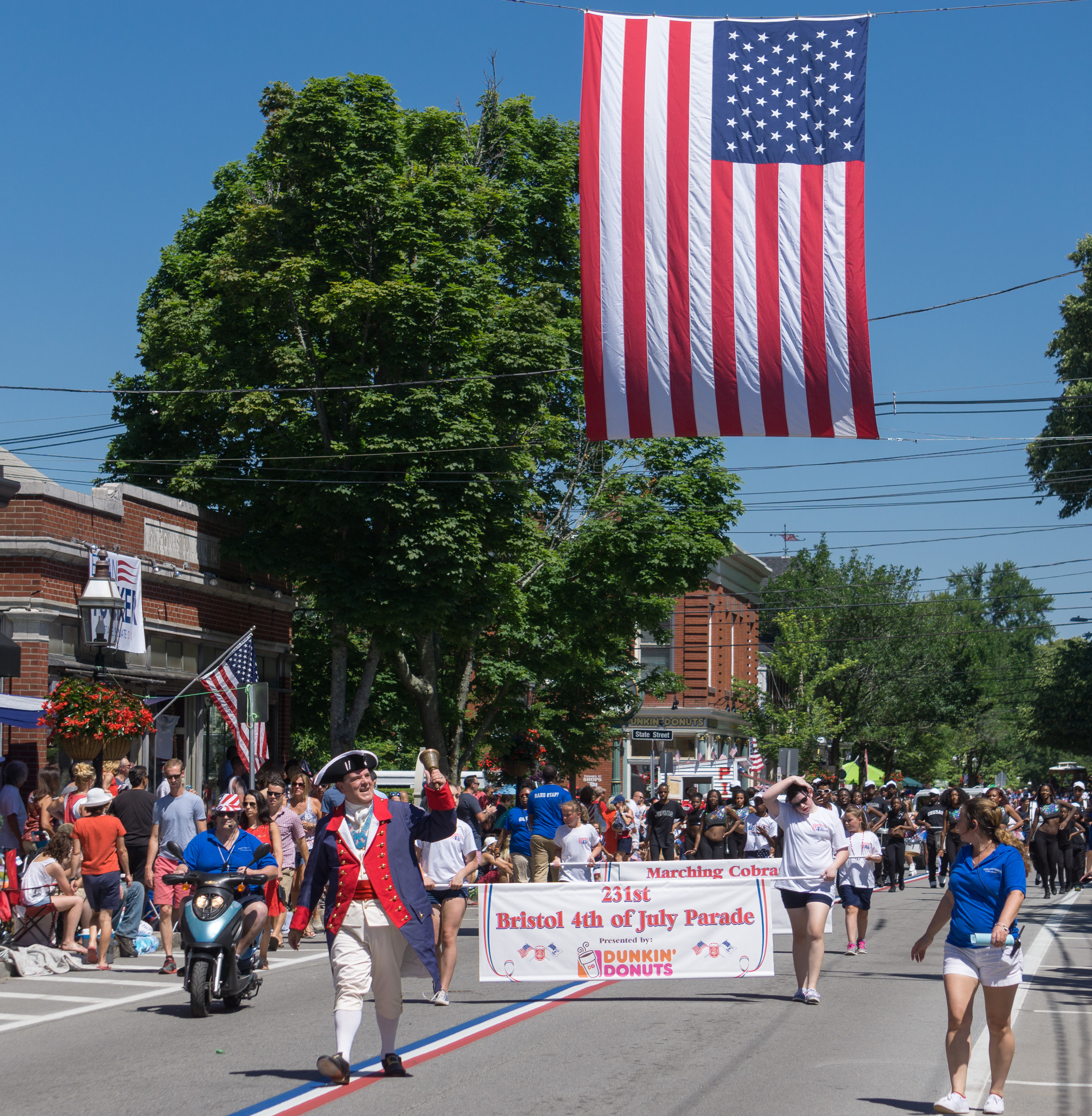
The front of the 231st Bristol Fourth of July Parade in 2016.

Bristol has the oldest continuously celebrated Independence Day festivities in the United States. The first mention of a celebration comes from July 1777, when a British officer noted sounds coming from across Narragansett Bay:

This being the first anniversary of the Declaration of Independence of the Rebel Colonies, they ushered in the morning by firing 13 cannons, one for each colony, we suppose. At sunset, the rebel frigates fired another round of 13 guns, each one after the other. As the evening was very still and fine the echo of the guns down the Bay had a grand effect.

The annual official and historic celebrations (Patriotic Exercises) were established in 1785 by Rev. Henry Wight of the First Congregational Church and veteran of the Revolutionary War, and later by Rev. Wight as the Parade, and continue today, organized by the Bristol Fourth of July Committee. The festivities officially start on June 14, Flag Day, beginning a period of outdoor concerts, soapbox car races and a firefighters' muster at Independence Park. The celebration climaxes on July 4 with the oldest annual parade in the United States, "The Military, Civic and Firemen's Parade", an event that draws over 200,000 people from Rhode Island and around the world. These elaborate celebrations give Bristol its nickname, "America's most patriotic town".

Bristol is represented in the parade with hometown groups like the Bristol Train of Artillery and the Bristol County Fifes and Drums.

== Geography ==
Bristol is situated on 10.1 square miles (26 km^{2}) of a peninsula (the smaller sub-peninsula on the west is called Poppasquash), with Narragansett Bay on its west and Mount Hope Bay on its east. According to the United States Census Bureau, the town has a total area of 20.6 square miles (53.4 km^{2}), of which 10.1 square miles (26.2 km^{2}) is land and 10.5 square miles (27.2 km^{2}) (50.99%) is water. Bristol's harbor is home to over 800 boat moorings in seven mooring fields.

=== Climate ===
Climate data for Bristol, Rhode Island
Month	Jan	Feb	Mar	Apr	May	Jun	Jul	Aug	Sep	Oct	Nov	Dec	Year
Record high °F (°C)	67 (19)	64 (18)	80 (27)	89 (32)	91 (33)	94 (34)	98 (37)	96 (36)	93 (34)	83 (28)	74 (23)	70 (21)	98 (37)
Mean daily maximum °F (°C)	38 (3)	40 (4)	47 (8)	58 (14)	68 (20)	77 (25)	83 (28)	82 (28)	74 (23)	64 (18)	53 (12)	43 (6)	61 (16)
Mean daily minimum °F (°C)	21 (−6)	22 (−6)	29 (−2)	38 (3)	48 (9)	58 (14)	64 (18)	63 (17)	56 (13)	45 (7)	35 (2)	27 (−3)	42 (6)
Record low °F (°C)	−7 (−22)	−7 (−22)	2 (−17)	18 (−8)	31 (−1)	41 (5)	50 (10)	49 (9)	35 (2)	27 (−3)	14 (−10)	4 (−16)	−7 (−22)
Average precipitation inches (mm)	3.66 (93)	3.34 (85)	4.52 (115)	3.90 (99)	3.54 (90)	3.90 (99)	3.54 (90)	4.03 (102)	3.90 (99)	4.64 (118)	3.90 (99)	4.52 (115)	47.39 (1,204)
Average snowfall inches (cm)	10 (25)	10 (25)	7.1 (18)	1 (2.5)	0 (0)	0 (0)	0 (0)	0 (0)	0 (0)	0 (0)	1 (2.5)	7.1 (18)	36.2 (91)
Source 1:
Source 2:

== Demographics ==
Historical population
Year	Pop.	±%
1748	1,069	—
1755	1,080	+1.0%
1774	1,209	+11.9%
1776	1,067	−11.7%
1782	1,032	−3.3%
1790	1,406	+36.2%
1800	1,678	+19.3%
1810	2,698	+60.8%
1820	3,197	+18.5%
1830	3,084	−3.5%
1840	3,490	+13.2%
1850	4,616	+32.3%
1860	5,271	+14.2%
1870	5,302	+0.6%
1880	6,028	+13.7%
1890	5,478	−9.1%
1900	6,901	+26.0%
1910	8,565	+24.1%
1920	11,375	+32.8%
1930	11,953	+5.1%
1940	11,159	−6.6%
1950	12,320	+10.4%
1960	14,570	+18.3%
1970	17,860	+22.6%
1980	20,128	+12.7%
1990	21,625	+7.4%
2000	22,469	+3.9%
2010	22,954	+2.2%
2020	22,493	−2.0%
U.S. Decennial Census

As of the census of 2020, there were 22,493 people and 8,480 households in the town. The population density was 2,224 inhabitants per square mile (859/km^{2}). There were 9,629 housing units in the town. The ethnic group makeup of the town was 91.18% White, 1.89% Black, 0.31% Native American, 1.04% Asian, 0.00% Pacific Islander, 1.02% other ethnic group, and 4.56% from two or more races. Hispanic or Latino of any race were 4.26% of the population.

There were 8,480 households, out of which 21.7% had children under the age of 18 living with them, 47.8% were married couples living together, 25.5% had a female householder with no spouse present and 21.1% had a male householder with no spouse present. 18.2% of all households were made up of individuals, and 5.8% had someone living alone who was 65 years of age or older. The average household size was 2.23 and the average family size was 2.91.

In the town, the population was spread out, with 13.3% under the age of 18, 17.9% from 18 to 24, 20.8% from 25 to 44, 26.0% from 45 to 64, and 22.0% who were 65 years of age or older. The median age was 43.5 years.

The median income for a household in the town was $96,005, and the median income for a family was $123,929. The per capita income for the town was $50,147. About 7.5% of the population was below the poverty line, including 6.6% of those under age 18 and 5.9% of those age 65 or over.

== Government ==
Bristol town vote by party in presidential elections
Year	GOP	DEM	Others
2020	39.42% 4,595	58.45% 6,813	2.10% 249
2016	38.26% 4,080	54.11% 5,771	7.63% 814
2012	36.11% 3,707	61.94% 6,359	1.96% 201
2008	35.39% 3,834	63.08% 6,833	1.53% 166
2004	38.30% 4,000	60.10% 6,276	1.60% 167
2000	32.20% 3,065	62.13% 5,914	5.67% 540
1996	26.15% 2,293	62.42% 5,474	11.44% 1,003
1992	28.00% 2,818	49.87% 5,018	22.13% 2,227
1988	42.51% 3,538	57.02% 4,746	0.47% 39

In the Rhode Island Senate, Bristol is split into three senatorial districts, all Democratic:

- District 10: Walter S. Felag, Jr.
- District 11: Linda Ujifusa
- District 32: Pamela Lauria

At the federal level, Bristol is a part of Rhode Island's 1st congressional district and is currently represented by Democrat Gabe Amo. In presidential elections, Bristol is a Democratic stronghold, as no Republican presidential nominee has won the town since prior to the 1988 election.

== Notable people ==
- William Thomas "Billy" Andrade, golfer with the PGA Tour; born in Bristol
- Ethel Barrymore Colt, silent film and stage actress; member of the influential Barrymore family
- Benjamin Bourne, US congressman and federal judge; born in Bristol
- William Bradford (1729–1808), physician, lawyer, and President pro tempore of the US Senate; lived and died in Bristol
- Jonathan Russell Bullock, federal and Rhode Island Supreme Court judge; born in Bristol
- Ambrose Burnside, railroad executive, US senator, 30th governor of Rhode Island, and Union Army general; lived and died in Bristol
- Sean Callery, Emmy-winning composer, raised in Bristol
- Mary Cantwell, journalist, magazine editor, author and member of The New York Times editorial board; grew up in Bristol
- Mary H. Gray Clarke (born 1835), correspondent
- Samuel P. Colt, entrepreneur, child labor advocate, and Rhode Island state representative; lived in Bristol
- Mark Anthony DeWolf (1726–1793) was the fourth child of Charles DeWolf, the only one who returned to America. He became the patriarch of the Bristol branch of the DeWolf family; he was a merchant and slave trader.
- James DeWolf (1764–1837), son of Mark Anthony DeWolf. He was one of the richest men of his time, making the majority of his fortune in the slave trade.
- Jonathan DeFelice, president of Saint Anselm College; lived in Bristol
- Rebecca Donovan, novelist
- Nancy Dubuc, businesswoman
- Ramon Guiteras, surgeon and urologist, born and buried in Bristol
- Nathanael Herreshoff, naval architect and mechanical engineer, designed several undefeated America's Cup winners; born in Bristol
- Gilbert C. Hoover, USN admiral involved in the nuclear bomb project
- Edward L. Leahy, US senator and federal judge; born in Bristol
- Ira Magaziner, senior adviser for policy development to the Clinton administration; Chairman of the Clinton Foundation Policy Board; lives in Bristol
- Seth Magaziner, U.S. representative for Rhode Island
- Pat McGee, musician (Pat McGee Band)
- Alice Locke Pittman, composer
- Anthony Quinn, actor (Zorba the Greek, Lawrence of Arabia, Viva Zapata!, Lust for Life); twice won the Academy Award for Best Supporting Actor (1952, 1956); lived in Bristol. He loved his home so much that he requested, and was given permission by the town, to be buried on his property.
- Norman Rene, theater and film director; born in Bristol
- John Saffin, merchant and author (A Brief and Candid Answer to Samuel Sewall's The Selling of Joseph, 1700); lived in Bristol
- Chris Santos, executive chef and owner of the Stanton Social and Beauty & Essex, judge on Chopped (Food Network TV), born in Bristol
- Benjamin Franklin Tilley (1848–1907), U.S. Navy rear admiral and Naval Acting-Governor of American Samoa; born in Bristol

== See also ==
- DeWolf family, a prominent local family which made their fortune in the slave trade
