= Leon de Wolff =

Dutch journalist, media consultant and researcher (1948–2014)

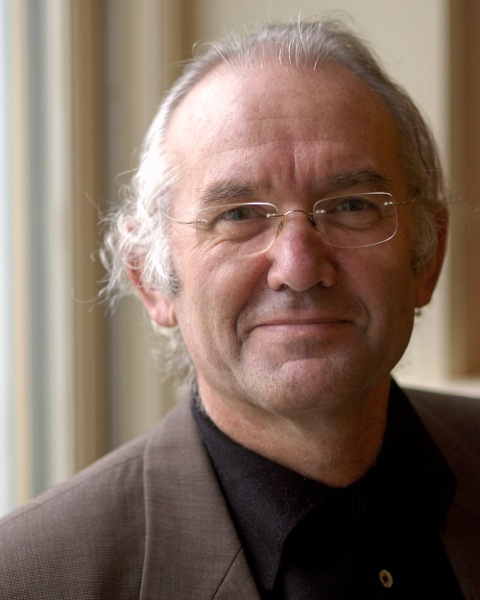
- Leon de Wolff in August 2013.
- Born: 26 September 1948; Rotterdam, South Holland, Netherlands
- Died: 3 January 2014 (aged 65); Epse, Gelderland, Netherlands
- Education: Erasmus University Rotterdam
- Occupations: Journalist, media consultant and researcher
- Years active: 1972–2014

Leon de Wolff (26 September 1948 – 3 January 2014) was a Dutch journalist and media consultant and researcher.

Leon de Wolff died from multiple system atrophy (MSA) on 3 January 2014, aged 65, in Epse near Lochem, Gelderland.

== Education ==
De Wolff graduated from the International School in Jerusalem in the 1960s, which gave him admission to the Mathenesser HBS in Rotterdam where he graduated in 1970. He then studied business sociology and business administration at Erasmus University in Rotterdam where he graduated cum laude in 1976. In 2012 he received his doctorate from the same university with Henri Beunders on a study of subscribers' loyalty to their newspaper.

== Career ==
Leon de Wolff held various journalistic positions at, among others, NRC Handelsblad (1972-1977), Haagse Post (1977-1983) and FEM Business (1984-1987). From 1987 he ran his own agency specializing in research, consulting and training. The disease MSA forced him to discontinue much of his work.

== Work ==
As a media consultant and researcher, De Wolff focused on the question of what makes a newspaper attractive to readers. To provide a framework for editorial discussions on this topic, he defined seven functions that content can have for subscribers, and six perspectives. These various combinations of functions and perspectives together form a matrix in which each position produces a different type of content. According to De Wolff, journalistic content becomes stronger the more clearly the journalist has a clearer understanding of the journalistic function and perspective they want to apply. Conversely, he sees weak journalistic content as the result of a mix of functions and perspectives. Applying his matrix can help journalists write not from their own perspective, but from the perspective of their readers.

When the rise of the internet led to a sharp decline in newspaper and magazine subscriptions, De Wolff was called upon by editors and publishers for help. According to De Wolff, the ideal newspaper consists of 25% insight, 20% overview, 10 to 20% advice and tips, 10% judgment, and 20% bare facts. The core of his advice has always been to address the needs and interests of subscribers and readers.

His ideas about a 'compact newspaper', 'focus' and 'audience-oriented journalism' were adopted in whole or in part by many editorial offices. His analysis model of how journalistic choices are made and how editorial offices discuss them is still widely used. The model is also still used for the analysis of journalistic content.

Leon de Wolff has had a significant influence on Dutch journalism. His method for audience-focused journalism gave editors new tools to refine their writing and produce better pieces. His starting point isn't the form an article takes (interview, report, analysis), but its function for the reader (providing insight, providing an overview, forming an opinion).

His approach has earned De Wolff both praise and criticism. His followers see his method as a good way to improve their writing. Critics see it as a way to pander to readers. De Wolff's book, "The Newspaper Was King" (2005), was critically reviewed. For example, Max Pam accused "magazine doctor De Wolff" of prescribing that journalists listen to their readers. Hubert Smeets accused him of "consumer fetishism." And John Jansen van Galen wrote in his review: "Moreover, De Wolff has the drive of a preacher who reinforces his sermons by caricaturing others. Those who oppose his views invariably appear in the guise of incurable romantics, unworldly artists, navel-gazers, or politicians disguised as journalists, but not as journalists. To qualify for that designation in his eyes, you have to be 'audience-oriented.'"

== Awards ==
In 2007, Leon de Wolff received a LOF40 award from the Lucas-Ooms Fund for his contributions to the magazine industry.

== Bibliography ==
- 2012 · Newspaper Loyalty, why subscribers stay or leave, Online proefschrift, Erasmus Universiteit Newspaper Loyalty: Why subscribers stay or leave Bewerking van proefschrift: Diemen: AMB ISBN 97890-79700-46-2
- 2007 · Publiekgerichte bedrijfsjournalistiek, Den Haag: Logeion ISBN 9080405795 (in Dutch)
- 2005 · De krant was koning. Publiekgerichte journalistiek en de toekomst van de media, Amsterdam: Bert Bakker ISBN 9035128974 (in Dutch)
