= DeWolf =

DeWolf may refer to:

== Places ==
- Dewolf Point State Park, in New York
- Fort DeWolf, American Civil War fort located just south of Shepherdsville, Kentucky

== People ==
- DeWolf family, a prominent Canadian and American family
- Harry DeWolf (1903–2000), Canadian naval hero and admiral in the Royal Canadian Navy
- DeWolf Hopper (1858–1935), American actor
- Stephen DeWolf (1833–1907), American lawyer, politician, and judge

== See also ==
- De Wolf, list of people with this surname and variant forms
- Canadian Navy Harry DeWolf-class of offshore patrol vessels
