= Benjamin DeWolf (merchant) =

Canadian politician

Benjamin DeWolf (died after 1836) was a merchant and political figure in Nova Scotia. He represented Hants County in the Nova Scotia House of Assembly from 1824 to 1836.

He was the son of Loran DeWolf and Mary Fox. Dewolf married Sarah Lovett (or Leavitt). He was elected to the assembly in an 1824 by-election held after William Hersey Otis Haliburton was appointed a judge. DeWolf lived in Windsor.
