= Elisha DeWolf Jr. =

Canadian political figure (1801–1850)

Elisha DeWolf Jr. (March 14, 1801 – September 27, 1850) was a political figure in Nova Scotia. He represented Kings County in the Nova Scotia House of Assembly from 1830 to 1836.

He was born in Horton, Nova Scotia (later Wolfville), the son of Elisha DeWolf and Margaret Ratchford. In 1826, he married Mary Eliza, the daughter of John Starr. DeWolf was postmaster at the village of Mud Creek, also known as Upper Horton located within Horton Township. He petitioned to have the post office renamed to Wolfville, some accounts indicate that this was in honour of his namesake father, a highly respected member of a community where many DeWolf families lived; the name was changed on Aug 13, 1830. DeWolf died in Sackville, New Brunswick, while travelling between Bathurst, New Brunswick and the United States.

== See also ==
- DeWolf family
