= Elisha DeWolf =

Canadian political figure (1756–1837)

Elisha DeWolf (May 5, 1756 – November 30, 1837) was a judge and political figure in Nova Scotia. He represented King's County in the Nova Scotia House of Assembly from 1793 to 1799 and from 1818 to 1820.

He was born in Saybrook, Connecticut, the son of Nathan DeWolf and Lydia Kirtland, and moved to Nova Scotia with his family in 1761 when they were granted land there. In 1779, he married Margaret Ratchford. He served as high sheriff for King's County from 1784 to 1789, also serving as postmaster, customs collector and justice of the peace. DeWolf was also assistant judge in the Court of Common Pleas. DeWolf lived in Horton (later named Wolfville in his honour).

He and Margaret had 12 children. His sons Thomas Andrew Strange, James Ratchford DeWolf and Elisha also served in the House of Assembly. A grandson, James Ratchford Dewolf, became a physician.

== See also ==
- DeWolf family
