= Thomas Andrew Strange DeWolf =

Nova Scotia politician (1795–1878)

Thomas Andrew Strange DeWolf (April 19, 1795 – September 21, 1878) was a merchant and political figure in Nova Scotia. He represented King's County in the Nova Scotia House of Assembly from 1837 to 1848.

He was born in Horton (later Wolfville, Nova Scotia), the son of Elisha DeWolf and Margaret Ratchford. In 1817 or 1818, he married his cousin Nancy Ratchford. He was named to the Executive Council in 1838 as Collector of Customs. DeWolf also served on the board of governors for Acadia College. He died in Wolfville in 1878.

His son James Ratchford Dewolf became a physician and the first superintendent of the province's Hospital for the Insane.

== See also ==
- DeWolf family
