= James DeWolf =

American slave trader and politician (1764–1837)

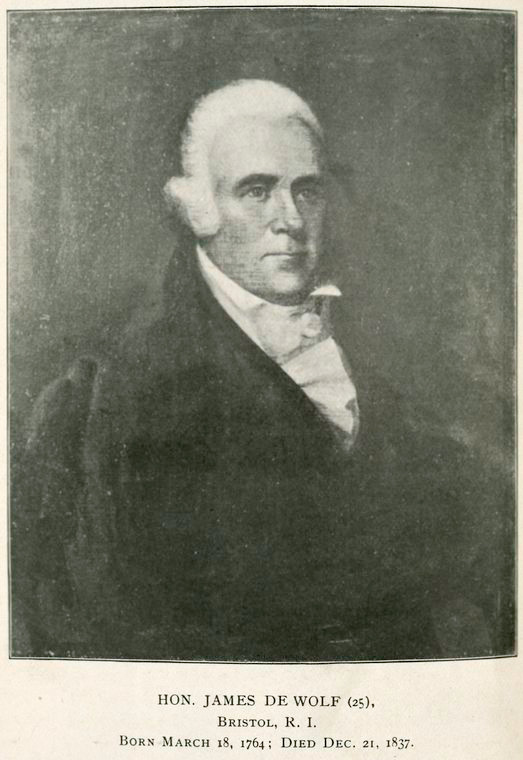

United States Senator from Rhode Island
- In office March 4, 1821 – October 31, 1825
- Preceded by: William Hunter
- Succeeded by: Asher Robbins

Member of the Rhode Island House of Representatives
- In office: 1798–1801; 1803–1812; 1817–1821; 1829–1837

Personal details
- Born: March 18, 1764 Bristol, Rhode Island
- Died: December 21, 1837 (aged 73) New York City, New York, U.S.
- Party: Democratic-Republican
- Spouse: Nancy Ann Bradford DeWolf (1770–1838) m. 1790
- Relations: DeWolf family Robert L. Cutting Jr. (great-grandson)
- Children: 12
- Parent(s): Mark Anthony DeWolf (1726–1793); Abigail Hazel Potter (1726–1809)
- Profession: Politician, Captain, Slaver

James DeWolf (March 18, 1764 – December 21, 1837) was an American slave trader and politician. He served as a state legislator for a total of nearly 25 years, and in the 1820s served as a United States senator from Rhode Island. Along with trading in slaves, DeWolf invested in sugar and coffee plantations in Cuba and became the wealthiest man in his state. By the end of his life, he was said to be the second-richest person in the entire United States. During his lifetime, his name was usually written "James D'Wolf".

== Early life ==
James DeWolf born in Bristol, Rhode Island, in 1764 to Mark Anthony DeWolf (November 8, 1726 – November 9, 1793) and Abigail Hazel Potter (February 2, 1726 – February 7, 1809). He had eight siblings including four brothers: Charles (1745–1820), John (1760–1841), William (1762–1829) and Levi DeWolf (1766–1848).

James DeWolf went to sea at an early age as a sailor on board American privateers during the later half of the American Revolutionary War. He participated in several naval encounters and was captured twice by the British.

== Slave trade ==
After the war, DeWolf was selected as captain of a ship in his 20s. He began to engage in commercial ventures, including slave trading, often purchasing seasoned slaves from Cuba and other ports in the West Indies and transporting them primarily to southern markets in the United States. Although Rhode Island outlawed slave trading in 1787, DeWolf and his family continued to finance and command slaving voyages to West Africa.

In 1791, DeWolf was indicted for murder by a grand jury in Newport, Rhode Island. The case was widely reported in the New England press. He was alleged to have directed the murder of a female African slave in 1789 who was sick with smallpox on the ship Polly, which he commanded; after having been treated to the best of the crew's knowledge, she was bound to a chair and lowered overboard. Such cases were known at the time, as all the persons on a ship were threatened in cases of severe disease outbreaks. The judge in charge of the case ultimately accepted the prosecuting attorney's filing of nolle prosequi, a formal declaration "that he did not wish to pursue the case." When DeWolf had heard of the indictment, he had immediately left for the Gold Coast of Africa.

DeWolf was later charged in the case in Saint Thomas, where he was then living. Two members of the crew, one of whom had taken part in the murder, as he had already had smallpox and was considered immune, said in a 1794 deposition taken in St. Eustatius, Leeward Islands, that the slave had to be thrown off in order to save the remainder of the slaves and crew from the infectious disease. This was justifiable according to contemporary maritime law. In 1795 DeWolf testified about the case in court in Saint Thomas, West Indies, with no one present to oppose his testimony; the Danish judge ruled in his favor.

DeWolf financed another 25 slaving voyages, usually with other members of his family. His father and uncle Simeon Potter were slave traders since 1769. His nephew George DeWolf kept it up illegally until 1820. In total, the DeWolf family is believed to have transported more than 11,000 slaves to the United States before the African slave trade was banned in 1808.

James DeWolf also owned a rum distillery for use in trade in West Africa, and with his brothers and nephews started the Bank of Bristol, with two generations of family, and an insurance company, which together financed and insured their slave ships. From 1805 to 1807, their Mount Hope Insurance Company insured 50 slaving voyages. A family member established a slave auction house in Charleston, South Carolina, the destination for many of their slave ships.

== Other ventures ==
With wealth gained from the trade, James DeWolf also bought and operated three sugar and coffee plantations in Cuba. Like similar plantations in the US Deep South, these depended on slave labor.

During the War of 1812, DeWolf fitted out privateers under the authority of the President of the United States. One of his ships, Yankee, became the most successful privateer of the war, intercepting British ships. The privateer captured a total of 40 British vessels worth more than $5 million during the war.

At this time, DeWolf also became a pioneer in cotton textile manufacturing, which expanded rapidly in New England. He became a founding member of a consortium that formed the Arkwright Manufacturing Company in 1809. The company built the Arkwright Mills in Coventry, Rhode Island in 1810. The textile mills of New England relied on cotton cultivated by slaves throughout the Deep South and shipped to the North. There were strong economic ties between the regions through the period of the American Civil War.

== Political career ==
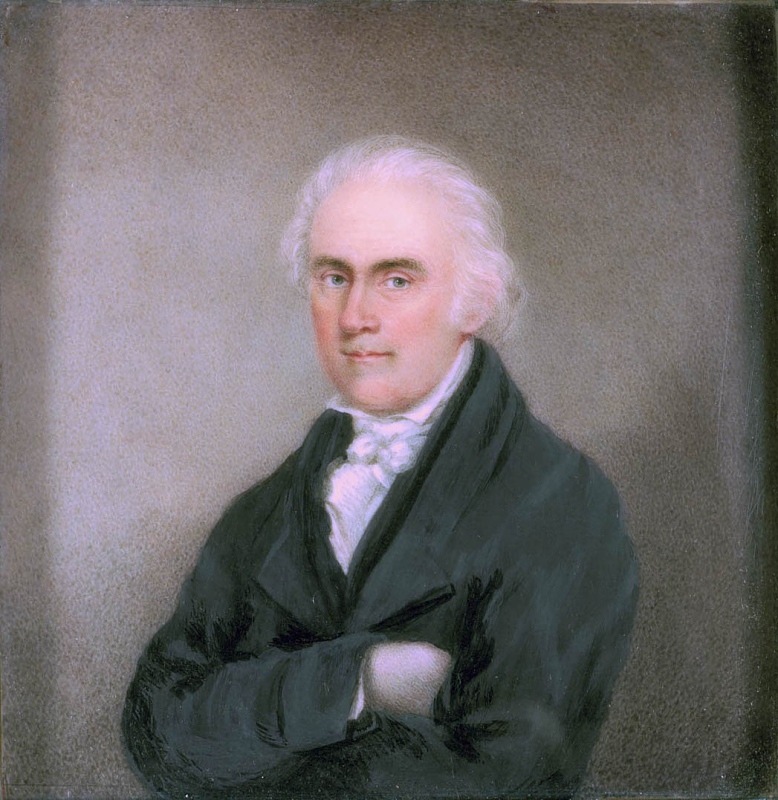
DeWolf in his later years.

DeWolf became active in politics and highly influential in the new state during the decades of the Federal period. He was first elected as a member of the Rhode Island House of Representatives in 1798, and served until 1801. He served again from 1803 to 1812, 1817–21, and 1829–37. He was elected as speaker of the House from 1819 to 1821.

DeWolf advanced to national office when elected by the state legislature as a Democratic-Republican (later Crawford Republican) to the U.S. Senate, as was the procedure before popular election of US senators was authorized by constitutional amendment in the 20th century. He served part of his six-year term, from March 4, 1821, until he resigned on October 31, 1825.

== Death ==
DeWolf died in New York City in 1837 at the age of 73, thought to be a millionaire and the second-wealthiest man in the United States. His body was returned to Rhode Island, and he was buried in the DeWolf private cemetery on Woodlawn Avenue in Bristol. His estate included properties in Bristol, New York, Maryland, Kentucky, and Ohio.

== Personal life ==
DeWolf married Nancy Ann Bradford (August 6, 1770 – January 2, 1838) of Bristol, R.I., on January 7, 1790. She was the daughter of William Bradford, deputy governor and a future U.S. senator from Rhode Island. Nancy and DeWolf had twelve children together including.

- James "Gentleman Jim" DeWolf II (1790–1845) m. Julia Lynch Post (1797–1878)
- Francis LeBaron DeWolf (1793-d. young)
- Mary Ann DeWolf (1795–1834) m(1). Lt, Raymond Henry Jones Perry (1789–1826) m(2). Gen. William Hyslop Summer (1780–1861)
- Francis LeBaron DeWolf (1797–1825) m. Eleanor Post (1799–1872)
- Mark Antony DeWolf (1799–1851) m. Sophie de Chappotinf (1802–1879)
- William Henry "The Commodore" DeWolf (1802–1853) m. Sarah Ann Rogers (1802–1864). Maternal grandfather of DeWolf Hopper.
- Harriet DeWolf (1804–1863) m. Jonathan Prescott Hall (1796–1862)
- Catherine Hersey DeWolf (1806–1853) m(1). 1823 Joshua Dodge (c1803-1872), a descendant of the Crowninshield family, m(2). 1848 Andrew Jackson Davis (1826–1910)
- Nancy Bradford DeWolf (1808–1856) m. Fitz-Henry Homer (1799–1856)
- William Bradford DeWolf (1810–1862) m. Mary Russell Soley (1805–1881). Their daughter, Harriette would marry Lloyd Aspinwall.
- Josephine Maria DeWolf (1812–1901) m. Charles Wally Lovett (1801–1873)

DeWolf named one of his brigs, the brig Nancy, after his wife.

== Relatives ==
DeWolf is one of the members of the Bristol (or also called Rhode Island) branch of the DeWolf family.

== Legacy ==
DeWolf is featured prominently in an Emmy nominated 2008 documentary, Traces of the Trade: A Story from the Deep North, co-produced and directed by Katrina Browne, a DeWolf descendant, which describes the DeWolf family's major role in the United States slave trade.

== See also ==
- DeWolf family

U.S. Senate
Preceded by William Hunter	U.S. senator (Class 1) from Rhode Island; March 4, 1821 – October 31, 1825; Served alongside: Nehemiah R. Knight	Succeeded by Asher Robbins
