= Barbara DeWolfe =

American ornithologist

Barbara Blanchard DeWolfe (May 14, 1912 – May 2, 2008) was an American ornithologist. She graduated with an undergrad in 1933 and obtained her PhD in 1939 both from UC Berkeley. She taught for several years and pioneered studies of avian life history and physiology on the white-crowned sparrow. Despite facing discrimination because she was a woman, she went on to publish over 30 works and was the 1995 recipient of the Cooper Ornithological Society’s Loye and Alden Miller Research Award, which is given in recognition of lifetime achievement in ornithological research.

== Early life ==
Barbara Blanchard DeWolfe was born on May 14, 1912, in San Francisco, California. She was the only child to her two parents, Marion and Elizabeth Blanchard. Though originally from San Francisco, DeWolfe moved to Mill Valley, California to live with her grandmother when she was ten years old. She was often sick as a child and was not able to attend school for her first two years in Mill Valley. She graduated Tamalpais High School in 1929 and went on to study at UC Berkeley where she graduated with a bachelor’s degree in zoology in 1933.

After graduation, she hoped to pursue teaching as a career. However, during the Great Depression, jobs were difficult to come by and schools wanted to hire teachers who had experience in multiple disciplines. Due to the difficulty of finding a job, DeWolfe decided to get a graduate degree and, under the advice of Joseph Grinnell, pursued her PhD.After obtaining her bachelor's degree, DeWolfe went on to get her Ph.D. in zoology at UC Berkeley in 1939.

DeWolfe was married twice. Her first marriage was to Nels Oakeson from 1950 to 1954 and her second was to Robert DeWolfe in 1960 to his death in 1977.

== Career ==
DeWolfe took her first position in 1939 after completing her PhD at Placer Junior College in Rocklin, California. She then began teaching at UC Davis where she taught zoology. However, due to World War 2, education was suspended and she was let go. Then, in 1943 she moved to Massachusetts and began teaching at Smith College, a women's college. She did not like the culture of the East Coast and decided to move back west. In 1946, she moved back west and began teaching at the University of California, Santa Barbara. DeWolfe taught until 1977 when she became the Associate Dean of the College of Letters and Science at UC Santa Barbara and later in life donated to the UC Santa Barbara Vertebrate Museum.

== Research ==
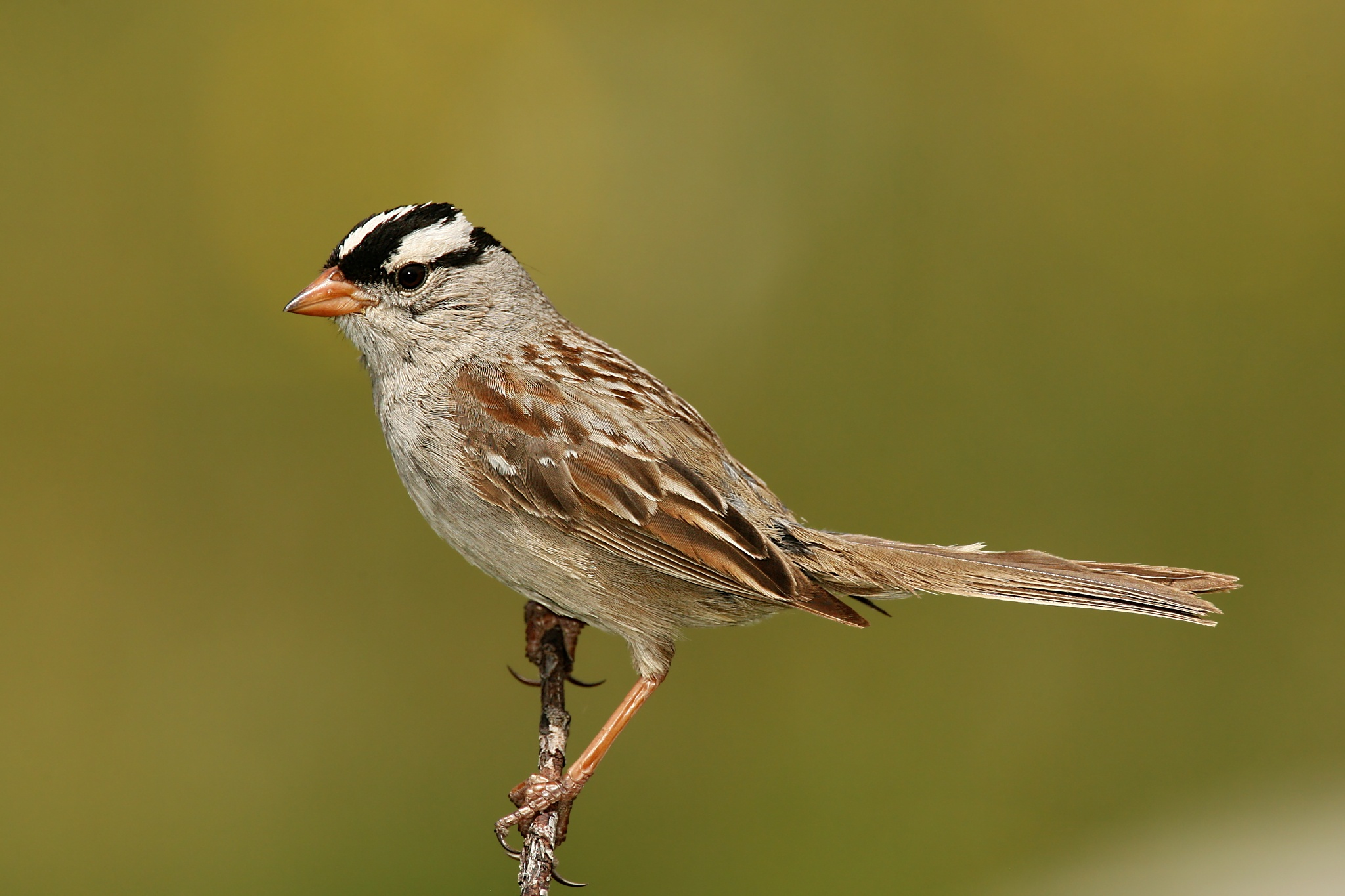
The white-crowned sparrow and focus of Barbara DeWolfe's Research

DeWolfe's research focused on the white-crowned sparrow. She studied living populations, rather than stuffed animals as was the previous method, in California and Alaska. She was observed variations in breeding and song to help determine differences between the races of the sparrow. She focused on three different species of the white-crowned sparrow: the Zonotrichia leucophrys pugetensis, the Z. l. nuttalli, and the Z. I. gambelii. The main difference she observed was the Z. I. pugetensis migrated while the Z. I. nuttalli did not. It was also observed that the Z. I. nuttalli showed breeding behavior for six months, went through gonadal recrudescence in December, had a slight prenatal molt, did not carry much fat, and had several local song dialects. The Z. l. pugetensis showed breeding behavior for four months, did not have breeding size gonads until after mid-April, put on large amounts of fat prior to migration, and had a small number widespread song dialects. Her later work on the Z. l. gambelii showed it was a long-distance migrating sparrow, had very different breeding distributions, and had no clear geographically structured song dialects. Her research on reproduction, song, and historical differences rather than simple physical differences led to the white-crowned sparrow being one of the most researched birds in the world. Her research led to over 30 publications and collaborations with Luis Baptista and Mary Erickson.

DeWolfe received the Loye and Alden Miller Research Award in 1995 for her groundbreaking research into the white-crowned sparrow's history.

During her research, she faced discrimination because she was a woman. Her department chair told her, "we'll never recommend you for a position for which we have a man available" and here PhD supervisor told her to focus on less difficult work like worms. She experience many other discriminatory instances when searching for a job out of college, such as being refused for job in the National Park Service because she was a woman. In spite of this discrimination, she was successful as a woman in science and in the field of ornithology.

== Late life ==
DeWolfe published two autobiographies that reside in the UC Santa Barbara Library, Joyous Errand (1998) and Further Recollections (1999). Over the last decade of her life, she experienced many chronic health conditions and she died of an intestinal blockage on May 2, 2008.
