= DeWolf family =

Canadian and American family

DeWolf family D’Wolf, De Wolf, DeWolfe, DeWoolf
- Coat of arms
- Current region: Rhode Island, Connecticut and Nova Scotia
- Origin: Europe
- Founded: 17th century
- Founder: Balthazar DeWolf
- Motto: Vincit Qui Patitur
- Estate: Linden Place

The DeWolf family (also spelled D’Wolf or DeWolfe) is a prominent Canadian and American family that traces its roots to Balthazar DeWolf, who was born in 1620 in the Netherlands and later immigrated to North America.

The DeWolf family played a significant role in the early colonial history of North America, particularly in the regions of New England and the Atlantic Canadian provinces. They were involved in various industries, including shipping, trade, and later, the slave trade.

In the 18th and 19th centuries, certain individuals from the DeWolf family rose to prominence as slave traders and held plantations in the Caribbean. They were deeply involved in the transatlantic slave trade, accumulating significant wealth from this enterprise.

In recent times, numerous descendants of the DeWolf family have been actively involved in confronting their ancestors' history of slave trading through their participation in documentaries, authoring books, and engaging in public discussions, these family members have openly addressed their family's past involvement in the slave trade.

== Balthazar DeWolf ==
Balthazar DeWolf (d. about 1696) is first mentioned in the records of Hartford, Connecticut, in 1656. He married a woman named Alice by 1646, it is not known where. Some believe she was Alice Peck, born on 26 February 1625, in Liddington, Rutland, England, a daughter of William Peck and Elizabeth Holt. They had at least five children. After 1668 they settled in Lyme, Connecticut.

It is thought that Balthazar DeWolf was from the Livonian branch of DeWolfs, which is an offshoot of the Saxon branch. However, that is only one of the most commonly cited versions, others mentioning that Balthazar DeWolf was a Huguenot, or Pole, or Russian, or Jew, or Dutch, or German. There is a high possibility that DeWolf was English or educated in England as he and his children only married to other English settlers, which was very common at the time.

There is also information that Abel, Dirck, and Balthazar De Wolf emigrated from Holland to New Amsterdam, New York. While Balthazar settled in Wethersfield, Connecticut in 1664, the other two returned to Holland.

Both Nova Scotia's and Rhode Island's DeWolfs are descendants of Balthazar DeWolf as shown below:

Pedigree of DeWolf
- Balthazar DeWolf (d. about 1696), m. Alice ____ (–1687)
  - Edward DeWolf (~1646 – 1712), m. Rebecca ____, had at least three sons
    - Simon DeWolf (1671–1704), m. Martha, who later m. Nathaniel Clark
      - John DeWolf
        - Nathan DeWolf (1720 – March 29, 1789), probably son of John, m. 1. Lydia Kirtland; 2. Anna (Prentis) Witter; emigrated to Nova Scotia.
      - Josiah DeWolf
    - Charles DeWolf (1673–1731), m. Prudence Beckwith (1676–1737)
      - Charles DeWolf of Guadeloupe (1695–1726), m. Margaret Potter
        - Simon DeWolf (1718 or 19 – )
        - Prudence DeWolf (1721 – )
        - Sarah DeWolf (1724 – )
        - Mark Anthony DeWolf (1726–1793), m. Abigail Potter (1726–1809); patriarch of the Bristol branch
      - Matthew DeWolf (1704 – )
        - Patience DeWolf (1722 – )
        - Ezra DeWolf (1723 – )
        - Matthew DeWolf, m. 1. Eunice Baker; 2. Elizabeth Burchard
        - Samuel DeWolf (1727 – )
        - Peter DeWolf (1730 – )
        - Edward DeWolf (1735 – )
      - Simon DeWolf (1709–1771)
      - John DeWolf
      - Stephen DeWolf
      - Lyman DeWolf
      - Prudence DeWolf
      - Mary DeWolf
      - Elizabeth DeWolf
      - Rebekah DeWolf
      - Joseph DeWolf (1717–1757) of Glastonbury, Connecticut, m. Tabitha Johnson
        - Abdi (or Abda) Dolph (1743 – ), m. Mary Coleman; changed the spelling of his last name from DeWolf to Dolph; forefather of Joseph N. Dolph and Cyrus A. Dolph
        - Prudence DeWolf
    - Benjamin DeWolf (1675–1734), m. Susannah Douglas
      - Simeon DeWolf (1713/19 – 1780/85), m. Parnell Kirtland, emigrated to Nova Scotia
        - Elizabeth DeWolf (1742 – ), m. William Andrews
        - Hon. Benjamin DeWolf (1744–1819), m. Rachel Otis (1741–1807), daughter of Nathaniel Kirtland and Phoebe (Marvin) DeWolf; forefather of Eliza Amelia Gore (1829–1916), for twenty-eight years Lady-in-waiting to Queen Victoria.
        - John DeWolf ( – 1812), m. 1. Susanna Hatch; 2. Elizabeth Graham
        - James DeWolf (1762–1834), m. 1. Keturah Calkin; 2. Nancy Lawrence; 3. Jane Parker
        - Charles DeWolf (1765 – ), m. Sabra Harding; 2. Sarah Miner
        - Lucy DeWolf, m. Jonathan Wilson
    - Edward DeWolf
    - Stephen DeWolf ( – 1711), m. Elizabeth
      - Gideon DeWolf
      - Stephen DeWolf
      - Charles DeWolf
  - Simon DeWolf (~1648 – 1695), m. Sarah Lay
    - Simon DeWolf (1682/82 – 1707)
    - Sarah DeWolf (1685 – )
    - John DeWolf (1687 – ), died unmarried
    - Josiah DeWolf (1689–1767), m. 1. Anna Waterman; 2. Abigail (Comstock) Lord
    - Phoebe DeWolf (1691/92 – ), m. Joseph Mather
    - Daniel DeWolf (1693–1715), m. Phoebe Marvin, who m. Nathaniel Kirtland
    - Jabez DeWolf
  - Stephen DeWolf (1652–1702), m. 1. Sarah Terry; 2. Hannah Jones
    - Edward DeWolf (1686 – )
    - Deborah DeWolf (1690 – ), m. Aaaron Huntley
      - Hannah Huntley (1708–1796), m. Ebenezer Mack
    - Hannah DeWolf (1693 – )
    - Stephen DeWolf (1694–1723), m. Hannah
      - Lewis DeWolf, lived in Lyme, was blind
      - Benjamin DeWolf Jr (1716 – ), m. Lucy Champion
      - Edward DeWolf
      - Josiah DeWolf (1723 – )
    - Benjamin DeWolf (1695 – ), m. Margaret ( – 1742); moved to Killingworth, Connecticut
      - Jehiel DeWolf (1725–1727)
      - Hester DeWolf (1726–1736)
      - Jehiel DeWolf 2nd (1727/31 – 1798), m. Phoebe Cobb; emigrated to Nova Scotia
        - Phoebe DeWolf, m. Ezekiel Comstock
        - Jehiel DeWolf (1755 – ), m. 1. Elizabeth Martin; 2. Anna Witter
        - Margaret DeWolf, m. 1. Samuel Witter; 2. James Brown
        - Oliver DeWolf, m. Amy Bishop
        - Daniel DeWolf, m. Lydia Kirtland Harris
        - Jerusha DeWolf, m. Peter Martin
        - Eunice DeWolf, m. Caleb Forsyth
        - Lydia DeWolf, m. 1. Samuel Starr; 2. Cyrus Peck; 3. Moses Stevens; with Samuel they are great-grandparents of Rev. Arthur Wentworth Hamilton Eaton.
      - Stephen DeWolf (1731 – )
      - Phoebe DeWolf (1731–1736)
      - Elijah DeWolf (1733 – ), m. Submit Wilcox
      - Esther DeWolf (1736–1818), m. a Wheeler
      - Phoebe DeWolf (1741–1742)
    - Lewis DeWolf (1698 – )
      - Edward DeWolf (1736 – ), m. Hannah Ely
    - Phoebe DeWolf (1701 – )
    - Josiah DeWolf
  - Mary DeWolf (1655 or 56 – 1724), m. 1. Thomas Lee (1644–1704)(died), 1676; 2. Matthew Griswold of Lyme, 1705, connecting the DeWolfs to the Griswold family
    - Hannah (Lee) Griswold, m. Judge John Griswold
      - Matthew Griswold, the 17th governor of Connecticut.
      - Phoebe Griswold
  - Susannah DeWolf (1664–1735), m. 1. Henry Champion, 1684; 2. John Huntley, 1709
  - Joseph DeWolf (probably) (1668–1719)

== Rhode Island branch ==
The Bristol or Rhode Island branch sprang from Charles DeWolf of Guadeloupe (1695–1726), who was born in Lyme, New London, Connecticut, the son of Charles DeWolf and Prudence DeWolf. He emigrated to Guadeloupe, the French West Indies. During the 18th and 19th centuries the D'Wolfs of Rhode Island were the largest slave traders in the state.

=== Notable members ===
- Mark Anthony DeWolf (1726–1793) was the fourth child of Charles DeWolf, the only one who returned to America. He became the patriarch of the Bristol branch of the family; he was a merchant and slave trader.
- James DeWolf (1764–1837), son of Mark Anthony DeWolf. He was one of the richest men of his time, making the majority of his fortune in the slave trade.
- General George W. DeWolf (1778–1844), a grandson of Mark Anthony DeWolf. He was a slave trader and the original owner of Linden Place.
- Captain John DeWolf (1779–1872), a grandson of Mark Anthony DeWolf through his son Simon DeWolf. He was also known as John DeWolf II and "Norwest John". After a maritime fur trade voyage to Alaska as captain of the ship Juno, he sold the ship to the Russian-American Company, then travelled across Siberia all way to St. Petersburg, Russia, by land, becoming the first American who crossed Asia. He captured this 1804–1807 expedition in his 1861 book A Voyage to the North Pacific and a Journey through Siberia More Than Half a Century Ago.
- Mark Antony De Wolfe Howe (1808–1895), a great-grandson of Mark Anthony DeWolf through Abigail (DeWolf) Ingraham (1755–1833), one of Mark Anthony's daughters. He was an Episcopal priest and later first Bishop of the Episcopal Diocese of Central Pennsylvania, the present-day Episcopal Diocese of Bethlehem.
- Theodora Goujaud DeWolf Colt (1820–1901), a daughter of George DeWolf. She was a published poet. She is credited with restoring Linden Place into one of the most famous mansions in New England. She was mother of LeBaron Bradford Colt and Samuel P. Colt.
- Charles DeWolf Brownell (1822–1909), son of Lucia Emilia DeWolf Brownell, granddaughter of Mark Anthony DeWolf. He was an American painter, best known for his landscape views.
- Mark Antony De Wolfe Howe Jr. (1864–1960), one of the eighteen children of Mark Antony De Wolfe Howe. He was an American editor and author, a recipient of the 1925 Pulitzer Prize for Biography or Autobiography.
- Charles Dana Gibson (1867–1944) was an American illustrator.

=== Legacy ===
DeWolf avenue in Bristol, Rhode Island is named after the DeWolfs.

In total, the Bristol DeWolfs are believed to have transported more than 11,000 slaves to the United States before the African slave trade was banned in 1808.

== DeWolfs of Nova Scotia ==
In 1761, three of Balthazar DeWolf's descendants, Simeon, Nathan and Jehiel DeWolf, with households amounting to 19 persons immigrated to Horton Township, Nova Scotia, to settle in the Grand Pre area. Evelyn M. Salisbury's genealogy published in 1892 identified the three men as cousins and it also appeared in A. W. H. Eaton's, History of Kings County, despite Eaton's efforts to change some parts of Salisbury's genealogy. In 1991 the publication of Dolphs and De Wolfs by Carol Stark Maginnis after extensive research of original sources, reviewing the correspondence between Rev. Eaton and Mrs. Stainsbury, and examining the research of the Lyme Study Group, concluded the men were three sons of Benjamin DeWolf Sr. (born in October 1695), who was a son of Steven and grandson of Balthazar. This matches Eaton's original belief the Nova Scotia family were descendants of Steven DeWolf, which had been disregarded in Salisbury's work, and which he then copied in his own books.

=== Notable members ===
- Nathan DeWolf (1720 – March 29, 1789) was born in Saybrook, Connecticut. He graduated Artium Magister at Yale College, New Haven in 1743. Moved to Horton in 1761. For many years he was senior Justice of the peace for King's County, Nova Scotia.
- Benjamin DeWolf (1744–1819) was a businessman and political figure in Nova Scotia, he is third cousin to Mark Anthony DeWolf.
- Loran DeWolf (1754 – after 1818) was a political figure in Nova Scotia.
- Elisha DeWolf (1756–1837) was born in Saybrook, Connecticut. He was a son of Nathan DeWolf and served as a judge and political figure in Nova Scotia.
- James Ratchford DeWolf (1787–1855) was a merchant and political figure in Nova Scotia. He was the fifth child of Elisha DeWolf.
- Thomas Andrew Strange DeWolf (1795–1878) was a merchant and political figure in Nova Scotia. He represented King's County in the Nova Scotia House of Assembly from 1837 to 1848. He was the ninth child of Elisha DeWolf.
- Elisha DeWolf Jr. (1801–1850) was a political figure in Nova Scotia. He was the eleventh child of Elisha DeWolf.
- Dr. James Ratchford DeWolf (1818–1901) was a physician and asylum superintendent. He is the eldest son of Thomas Andrew Strange DeWolf. In 1841, he graduated from the Royal College of Surgeons, Edinburgh.
- Alice Starr (Chipman) Tilley (1844–1921) was the wife of Hon. Sir Samuel Leonard Tilley, C.B., K.C.M.G., late Minister of Finance and the Lieutenant Governor of New Brunswick. She was a granddaughter of William, the second child of Elisha DeWolf. She is mother of Leonard Percy de Wolfe Tilley, the 21st Premier of New Brunswick.
- Rev. Arthur Wentworth Hamilton Eaton (1849–1937) was a Protestant Episcopal clergyman, educator and scholar.
- Vice Admiral Harry DeWolf CBE, DSO, DSC, CD (1903–2000) was a Canadian naval officer who was famous as the first commander of HMCS Haida during the Second World War.
- James DeWolfe (b. 1949) is a former political figure in Nova Scotia. He represented Pictou East in the Nova Scotia House of Assembly from 1998 to 2006 as a Progressive Conservative.

=== Legacy ===
Wolfville, Nova Scotia was renamed after the DeWolf family. Elisha DeWolf, Jr. was the postmaster of the community when the postal district name became official on August 13, 1830, replacing prior names including Mud Creek and Upper Horton. It was suggested the change was out of respect for his namesake father, Elisha DeWolf.

== Other DeWolfs ==
- Delos DeWolf (1811–1882), a prominent citizen of Oswego, New York, United States, a politician and a banker.
- Calvin DeWolf (1815–1899), a prominent lawyer and the first secretary of the Illinois chapter of the American Anti-Slavery Society.
- Joseph N. Dolph (1835–1897) was an American politician and attorney in the state of Oregon.
- Cyrus Abda (C. A.) Dolph (1840–1914) was a businessman in Portland, Oregon, United States.
- Wallace Leroy DeWolf (1854–1930), son of Calvin DeWolf, was an American lawyer, businessman, philanthropist, and artist.

== Heraldry ==
Coat of arms of the DeWolf family
Notes The arms of the DeWolf family are canting. Coronet A Baron of the Holy Roman Empire's coronet Crest A wolf gules holding his dexter paw a fleur-de-lys or, issuant from a Baron of the Holy Roman Empire's coronet Escutcheon Or, 3 wolf heads erased sable Supporters The whole arms borne upon a double-headed eagle or Motto Vincit Qui Patitur

== See also ==
- Members of the DeWolf family
