= Wolf (name) =

Wolf is a given name and a surname. It is common among Germanic-speaking peoples, alongside variants such as Wulf. Names which translate to English "wolf" are also common among other nations, including many Native American peoples within the current or former extent of the habitat of the grey wolf (essentially all of North America).

== Geographical distribution ==
As of 2014, 53.2% of all known bearers of the surname Wolf were residents of Germany (frequency 1 out of 413), 27.4% of the United States (1 out of 3,608), 3.9% of Austria (1 out of 596), 2.5% of Brazil (1 out of 21,995), 1.4% of Switzerland (1 out of 1,622), 1.2% of the Netherlands (1 out of 3,735) and 1.0% of France (1 out of 17,534).

In Germany, the frequency of the surname was higher than national average (1 out of 413) in the following states:

1. Saxony (1 out of 214)
2. Rhineland-Palatinate (1 out of 292)
3. Hesse (1 out of 297)
4. Thuringia (1 out of 297)
5. Bavaria (1 out of 337)
6. Brandenburg (1 out of 365)
7. Baden-Württemberg (1 out of 368)
8. Saxony-Anhalt (1 out of 394)

== Given name ==
- Wolf Biermann (born 1936), German singer-songwriter
- Wolf Blitzer (born 1948), American journalist
- Wolf Burchard, British-German art historian
- Wolf Heckmann (1929–2006), German journalist
- Wolf Henzler (born 1975), German racing driver
- Wolf Hilbertz (1938–2007), German architect
- Wolf Hoffmann (born 1959), German guitarist
- Wolf Howard (born 1968), English artist and musician
- Wolf Kahler (born 1946), German actor
- Wolf Kahn (1927–2020), German-born American painter
- Wolf Karni (1911–1996), Finnish football referee
- Wolf Larson (born 1959), Canadian actor
- Wolf Mail (born 1972), Canadian guitarist
- Wolf Mankowitz (1924–1988), English writer
- Wolf Mendlin (1842–1912), Russian economist
- Wolf Neumeister (1897–1984), German screenwriter
- Wolf Ruvinskis (1921–1999), Mexican actor
- Wolf Schäfer (born 1942), German-American historian
- Wolf Curt von Schierbrand (1807–1888), German zoologist
- Wolf Van Halen (born 1991), American bassist
- Wolf V. Vishniac (1922–1973), American biologist
- Wolf Wigo (born 1973), American water polo player and coach

== Surname ==
- Aaron Wolf (disambiguation), several people
- Abraham Wolf (1876–1948), Russian-born English historian, writer, philosopher, and rabbi
- Alfred Wolf (disambiguation), several people
- Alice Wolf (1933–2023), American politician
- Aliya Wolf (born 1975), American model
- Allan Wolf, American author
- Amnon Wolf (born 1971), Israeli actor and dubber
- Andreas Wolf (born 1982), German footballer
- Ann Wolf (disambiguation), several people
- Armin Wolf (born 1966), Austrian journalist and television anchor
- Austin Wolf (born 1981), American pornographic actor
- Benno Wolf (1871–1943), German judge, speleologist, and Holocaust victim
- Birgitta Wolf (1913–2009), Swedish writer
- Carrie Wolf, American officer and judge advocate
- Charles Wolf (disambiguation), several people
- Christa Wolf (1929–2011), German writer
- Christie Wolf (born 1966), American bodybuilder and wrestler
- Clarence Wolf (1860–1937), American banker, businessman, and politician
- Dale E. Wolf (1924–2021), American politician
- Daniel James Wolf (born 1961), American music composer
- Danny Wolf (born 2004), American-Israeli basketball player
- David Wolf (disambiguation), several people
- Dick Wolf (born 1946), American television producer
- Diego Wolf, Argentine water polo player
- Dragutin Wolf (1866–1927), Croatian industrialist
- Dustin Wolf (born 2001), American ice hockey goaltender
- Edwin Wolf (1855–1934), American manufacturer and banker
- Eli Wolf (born 1997), American football player
- Emil Wolf (1922–2018), American physicist
- Emma Wolf (1865–1932), American novelist
- Eric Wolf (1923–1999), American anthropologist
- Ernst Wilhelm Wolf (1735–1792), German composer
- Ethan Wolf (born 1995), American football player
- Frank Wolf (disambiguation), several people
- František Wolf (1904–1989), Czech mathematician
- Franz Wolf (disambiguation), several people
- Fred Wolf (disambiguation), several people
- Friedrich Wolf (disambiguation), several people
- Gary Wolf (disambiguation), several people
- Guido Wolf (disambiguation), several people
- Gusti Wolf (1912–2007), Austrian actor
- Hanna Wolf (1908–1999), East German historian and politician
- Hannes Wolf (disambiguation), several people
- Hanns Wolf (1894–1968), German composer and pianist
- Harry Wolf (disambiguation), several people
- Heinrich Wolf (1875–1943), Austrian chess player
- Henry Wolf (disambiguation), several people
- Hugo Wolf (1860–1903), Austrian composer
- J. J. Wolf (born 1998), American tennis player
- Jack Keil Wolf (1935–2011), American computer scientist
- Jackson Wolf (born 1999), American baseball player
- James Wolf (disambiguation), several people
- Jenny Wolf (born 1979), German ice speed skater
- Jeremy Wolf (born 1993), American-Israeli baseball player
- Jim Wolf (born 1969), American baseball umpire
- Jimmy Wolf (1862–1903), American baseball player
- Joan Wolf (born 1951), American writer
- Joe Wolf (born 1964), American basketball player
- Johann Christoph Wolf (1683–1739), German Hebraist and book collector
- John Wolf (disambiguation), several people
- Joseph Wolf (1820–1899), German natural history illustrator
- Joseph A. Wolf (1936–2023), American mathematician
- Josh Wolf (disambiguation), several people
- Julia Wolf, British mathematician
- Julius Wolf (born 1993), German basketball player
- Kate Wolf (1942–1986), American folk singer and songwriter
- Katie Wolf (1925–2020), American politician
- Kati Wolf (born 1974), Hungarian singer
- Konrad Wolf (1925–1982), German film director
- Lana Wolf (born 1975), Dutch rock singer and radio producer
- Laurent Wolf (born 1971), French music producer
- Linda Wolf (born 1950), American-born photographer and writer
- Lucien Wolf (1857–1930), English journalist
- Marek Wolf, Czech astronomer
- Marilyn Wolf, American computer engineer
- Marius Wolf (born 1995), German footballer
- Markus Wolf (1923–2006), East German intelligence head
- Markus Wolf (politician) (born 1980), German politician
- Mary Wolf (disambiguation), several people
- Max Wolf (1863–1932), German astronomer
- Michael Wolf (disambiguation), several people
- Michèle Wolf (footballer) (born 1954), French association football player
- Michelle Wolf, American comedian, writer, producer, and television host
- Milton A. Wolf (1924–2005), American real estate developer and diplomat
- Naomi Wolf (born 1962), American author, journalist, and former political advisor to Al Gore and Bill Clinton
- Notker Wolf (1940–2024), German Benedictine monk, priest, musician and author
- Patrick Wolf (disambiguation), several people
- Peter Wolf (disambiguation), several people
- Randy Wolf (born 1976), American baseball player
- Raymond Wolf (1904–1979), American athlete and coach
- Remi Wolf (born 1996), American musician
- Robert Wolf (disambiguation), several people
- Ron Wolf (born 1938), American football general manager
- Rudolf Wolf (1816–1893), Swiss astronomer and mathematician
- Scott Wolf (disambiguation), several people
- Sebastian Wolf (disambiguation), several people
- Sherry Wolf (born 1949), American photorealist painter and designer
- Shmuel Wolf (1934–2019), Hungarian-born Israeli actor
- Simon Wolf (1826–1923), American businessman, lawyer, diplomat and Jewish activist
- Slavko Wolf (1862–1936), Croatian lawyer, chess player and writer
- Solly Wolf (1949 or 1950–2025), British businessman residing in the UAE
- Steven Wolf (disambiguation), several people, includes Stephen
- Susan Wolf (born 1952), American moral philosopher
- Sven Wolf (born 1976) German politician
- Terry Wolf, American politician
- Thomas Wolf (disambiguation), several people, includes Thom and Tom
- Tony Wolf (1930–2018), pseudonym of Italian illustrator and writer Antonio Lupatelli
- Tom Wolf (born 1948), Governor of Pennsylvania
- Wally Wolf (1930–1997), American swimmer, water polo player, and Olympic champion
- Wally Wolf (baseball) (1942–2020), American baseball player
- Walter Wolf (disambiguation), several people
- Warner Wolf (born 1937), American television and radio sports broadcaster
- Warren Wolf (disambiguation), several people
- Wilhelm Wolf (disambiguation), several people
- William Wolf (disambiguation), several people
- Wolfgang Wolf (born 1957), German soccer player and coach
- Yoni Wolf (born 1979), American alternative hip-hop/indie rock artist, best known for WHY? project

== Nickname or stage name ==
- Carl Samah, known by his stage name "Karl Wolf"
- Enzo Coloni, Italian race car driver and founder of the Scuderia Coloni racing team, nicknamed "the wolf"
- Gustav Wagner (1911–1980), Austrian SS officer at Sobibór extermination camp
- Michael Van Wijk, known by the pseudonym Wolf on the television series Gladiators
- Tyler, the Creator often calls himself in his songs Wolf Haley
- Harry Michael, known by his stage name "Masked Wolf"
- Wanessa Ferreira de Sousa, known by her nickname "Wanessa Wolf"

== Fictional characters ==
- Bigby Wolf, in the comic book series Fables
- Claudia Wolf, in the Silent Hill video game series
- Crying Wolf, in the Metal Gear video game series
- Father Wolf, in the 1894 novel The Jungle Book by Rudyard Kipling
- Lazar Wolf, a prominent supporting character in Fiddler on the Roof (1964 musical)
- Marcus Wolf, from the film Deep Impact
- Marty Wolf, a film producer and the main antagonist of Big Fat Liar
- Ralph Wolf, in a series of animated cartoons from Looney Tunes and Merrie Melodies
- Sniper Wolf, in the Metal Gear video game series
- Wolf, in the 1984 novel The Talisman by Stephen King and Peter Straub
- The Wolf, the name by which Ezra is known in The Night Angel Trilogy fantasy series
- Wolf, codename for a character in the novel Stormbreaker by Anthony Horowitz
- Wolf, the nickname given to Ze'ev Kesley of The Lunar Chronicles fantasy novel series
- Wolf (The 10th Kingdom), on the television show The 10th Kingdom
- Wolf, from 1990/94 video games Fire Emblem: Shadow Dragon and the Blade of Light, Fire Emblem: Mystery of the Emblem, and their respective remakes
- Wolf O'Donnell, in the Star Fox series of video games
- Wolf Edmunds, a deceased astronaut in the 2014 science fiction film Interstellar
- Wolf Hawkfield, in the Virtua Fighter video game series
- Wolf Larsen, in the 1904 novel The Sea-Wolf by Jack London
- Wolf Stoller, a German banker from Herman Wouk's The Winds of War book and television miniseries
- Wolf, street name for a character in Need for Speed: Carbon
- Wolf, a main character in the streaming television series Future Man
- Wolf, the protagonist of Sekiro: Shadows Die Twice
- Wolf, a main character in the animated television series Kipo and the Age of Wonderbeasts
- Wolf, a playable character in the Payday video game series developed by Overkill Software.

== See also ==
- Little Wolf (c.1820 –1904), Cheyenne war leader
- Joseph Lonewolf (born 1932), Pueblo potter
- Minnie Spotted-Wolf (1923–1988), first female Native American Marine
- Mountain Wolf Woman (1884–1960), Ho-Chunk woman and biographical subject
- Myron Wolf Child (1983–2007), Canadian politician and activist
- Wolf Robe (1838–1910), Cheyenne chief
- Wolfe (given name)
- Wolfe (surname)
- Wolff, surname
- Wolffe, a surname
- Woolf (surname)
- Woolf (given name)
- Woolfe (surname)
- Wulf, a surname
- Zev Wolf, Jewish double-name with both parts having the same meaning in Hebrew (Ze'ev, Zev) and Yiddish
- Volf, surname
