= Woolf (disambiguation) =

Virginia Woolf was an English writer.

Woolf may also refer to:

- Woolf (surname)
- Woolf (given name)
- Woolf (band)
- Woolf College, Kent, the newest college of the University of Kent
- The Woolf Institute, an academic institute in Cambridge, England, dedicated to the study of interfaith relations between Jews, Christians and Muslims
- Woolf University, a Maltese higher education system of colleges
