= Thomas Wolf =

Thomas Wolf or Wolfe may refer to:

== Wolf ==
- Thom Wolf (born 1944), professor at University Institute, New Delhi, India
- Thomas Wolf (criminal), German criminal and fugitive
- Thomas Wolf, CEO of German company RIB Software
- Tom Wolf (born 1948), former governor of Pennsylvania from 2015-2023
- Thomas Wolf (footballer) (born 1963), Luxembourgian football defender

== Wolfe ==
- Thomas Wolfe (1900–1938), American novelist
  - Thomas Wolfe House, his boyhood home, now a museum
- Tom Wolfe (1930–2018), American journalist and novelist
- Tom Wolfe (woodcarver), American craftsman
- Tommy Wolfe (1900–1954), Welsh footballer

== See also ==
- Thomas Wolff (1954–2000), American mathematician
- Thomas (disambiguation)
- Wolfe (disambiguation)
- Wolf (disambiguation)
