= John Woolf =

John Woolf may refer to:

- John Woolf (producer), British film producer, with his brother James
- John Elgin Woolf, American architect
- John William Woolf, Canadian politician

== See also ==
- John Wolf (disambiguation)
- John Woolfe, British racing driver
