= Wolfsohn =

- Pronunciation: [volfzo:n]

Origin
- Languages: German, Yiddish
- Meaning: son of Wolff, Wolf

Other names
- Variant forms: Wolfson, Wolfssohn, Wolffssohn; Wolffson, Wolfsson, Wolffsson; Wolfowitz, Wolfskin; Ze'ev, Ze'evi

Wolfsohn is a German language surname, which means "son of Wolf". Alternative spellings include Wolffsohn, Wolfssohn, and Wolffssohn. The name may refer to:

- Aaron Halle-Wolfssohn (1754–1835), German translator and writer
- Alfred Wolfsohn (1896–1962), German singing teacher
- David Wolffsohn (1856–1914), German businessman and Zionist activist
- Michael Wolffsohn (born 1947), German historian

== See also ==
- Wolfson
- Wolffsohn's viscacha
- Wolffsohn's leaf-eared mouse
