= Wolfensohn =

Wolfensohn (Yiddish: וואלפנזאן, Hebrew: וולפנזון) is a surname. Notable people with the surname include:

- Avraham Wolfensohn (1783–1855), rabbi and Talmudic judge
- James Wolfensohn (1933–2020), Australian-American economist, World Bank president

== Wolfenson ==
- Moisés Wolfenson (born 1966), a Jewish Peruvian congressman

== See also ==
- Ben-Zeev, Hebrew for Wolf's son
- Wolfsohn, Wolffsohn
- Wolfson (disambiguation)
