= Wolfe (surname) =

Notable people and characters with the surname Wolfe include:

== A ==
- Alan Wolfe, political scientist and sociologist
- Allison Wolfe, singer
- Andy Wolfe, American college basketball player
- Ann Wolfe, boxer
- Anthony Wolfe, footballer
- Art Wolfe, photographer
- Arthur M. Wolfe, American astrophysicist

== B ==
- Beatie Wolfe, Anglo-American artist and pioneer
- Bernard Wolfe, American writer
- Bernie Wolfe (ice hockey) (born 1951), Canadian National Hockey League player
- Bertram Wolfe, American scholar
- Billy Wolfe (1896–1963), American wrestling promoter
- Bob Wolfe (clergyman) (Robert Wolfe), 20th-century American clergyman, founder of the Metropolitan Community Church of Toronto
- Bob Wolfe (American football) (1946–2023), American football coach

== C ==
- Catharine Lorillard Wolfe, philanthropist
- Charles Wolfe (disambiguation), several people
- Chelsea Wolfe, singer-songwriter
- Chelsea Wolfe (BMX cyclist), American Olympian
- Claire Wolfe, author

== D ==
- David Møller Wolfe, Norwegian footballer
- David W. Wolfe, American politician
- Desmond Wolfe, English professional wrestler
- Dudley Wolfe, American businessman and yachtsman who died climbing K2
- Dusty Wolfe, American professional wrestler

== E ==
- Edward Wolfe (disambiguation), several people, including those known as Ed Wolfe
- Elsie de Wolfe, interior decorator
- Ethyle R. Wolfe (1919–2010), American classicist

== F ==
- Florida J. Wolfe (c. 1867–1913), African-American socialite, philanthropist and rancher

== G ==
- Gary Wolfe (wrestler), professional wrestler
- Gary K. Wolfe, American author
- Gene Wolfe (1931–2019), American author of science fiction and fantasy
- George Wolfe (cartoonist), American cartoonist
- George Wolfe (CPA), American government administrator in Iraq
- George Wolfe (Irish politician), member of the Irish parliament
- George C. Wolfe, African-American playwright
- Glynn Wolfe (1908–1997), American Baptist minister and hotel owner, known for having a large number of marriages
- Gregory Baker Wolfe, American diplomat

== H ==
- Harry Kirke Wolfe (1858–1918), American psychologist
- Heffer Wolfe, fictional character
- Herman L. Wolfe Sr. (1930–1989), American politician
- Hugh Wolfe, American football player
- Humbert Wolfe, British poet

== I ==
- Ian Wolfe, (1896–1992), actor

== J ==
- Jack A. Wolfe, American paleontologist
- Jack Wolfe, English actor
- Jacques Wolfe, musician
- James Wolfe (disambiguation), several people, including those known as Jim Wolfe
- Jane Wolfe, actress
- Jasper Wolfe, politician
- Jenna Wolfe, journalist
- John Bascom Wolfe (1904–1988), American social and behavioural psychologist
- John Lewis Wolfe (1798–1881), architect, artist and stockbroker
- John Thomas Wolfe (1955–1995), Canadian veterinarian and politician
- Jonathan Wolfe (Robotech), a fictional character
- Joseph Wolfe, conductor
- Julia Wolfe, American composer

== K ==
- Kathy Wolfe Moore (born 1957), American politician
- Kelly Wolfe (born 1973), American professional wrestler best known as Wolfie D
- Kenneth H. Wolfe, Irish educator
- Kenneth W. Wolfe (1908–1981), American politician

== L ==
- Lanny Wolfe, songwriter
- Louise Adelaide Wolf, American mathematician and university professor

== M ==
- Madison Wolfe American actor
- Malcolm Wolfe (born 1952), Australian cricketer
- Marianne Wolfe, Presbyterian leader
- Meagan Wolfe, U.S. election official
- Michael Wolfe (disambiguation), or Mike Wolfe, several people
- Miriam Wolfe (1922–2000), American actress, director, producer, and writer

== N ==
- Nathan Wolfe (born 1970), American virologist
- Nero Wolfe, a fictional detective
- Nick Wolfe, a fictional character from the universe of Highlander: The Raven
- Nyle Wolfe (born 1971), Irish operatic baritone

== O ==
- Oscar O. Wolfe Jr. (1890–1978), American politician from Mississippi

== P ==
- Patrick Wolfe (1949–2016), Australian anthropologist and historian of colonialism
- Patsy Wolfe, Australian lawyer and judge
- Paul Wolfe, American NASCAR crew chief and former driver
- Peter Wolfe (musician), English musician
- Peter Wolfe (Sports Rankings), owner of a BCS sports ranking system

== R ==
- Rachel Wolfe-Goldsmith (born 1991), American artist
- Ralph S. Wolfe (1921–2019), American microbiologist
- Randy Wolfe (1951–1997), known as Randy California, American rock guitarist
- Reginald Wolfe, English printer
- Robert Wolfe (disambiguation), several people
- Ronald Wolfe, half of the British scriptwriting duo Chesney and Wolfe
- Rose Wolfe, Canadian former Chancellor of the University of Toronto
- Ryan Wolfe (CSI: Miami), a fictional character from the show CSI: Miami

== S ==
- Sara Wolfe (born 1983), Indigenous Canadian nurse, midwife, and healthcare advocate
- Sidney M. Wolfe (1937–2024), American physician
- Steven Wolfe (born 1979), American adult film performer, director, and YouTuber
- Swain Wolfe (born 1939), American author and filmmaker

== T ==
- Thomas Wolfe (1900–1938), American novelist
- Tom Wolfe (1930–2018), American journalist and novelist
- Tom Wolfe (woodcarver)
- Travis Wolfe Jr. (born 2006), American actor

== W ==
- Walter P. Wolfe (1886–1976), American lawyer and politician
- William Wolfe (known as Billy Wolfe; 1924–2010), Scottish politician, leader of the SNP 1969–1979
- William F. Wolfe (1868–1917), American politician from Wisconsin
- Winston Wolfe, a fictional character from the movie Pulp Fiction

== See also ==
- De Wolfe, another surname
- Wolf (name), given name and surname
