= Wolfe =

Wolfe may refer to:

== Places ==
=== Canada ===
- Wolfe (provincial electoral district), a former electoral district in Quebec
- Wolfe Lake, Ontario
- Wolfe Island (Ontario), in Lake Ontario, Ontario
- Wolfe Island (Nova Scotia), in the Atlantic Ocean near Nova Scotia

=== United States ===
- Wolfe County, Kentucky
- Wolfe, West Virginia, an unincorporated community

== People and fictional characters ==
- Wolfe (surname), a list of people and fictional characters
- Wolfe (given name), a list of people
- Runt Wolfe, nickname of Moe Berg, Major League Baseball player, and spy

== Other uses ==
- HMS Wolfe, various Royal Navy ships
- Die Wölfe, a 2009 German miniseries
- Wolfe Laboratories, a research organization acquired by Pace Analytical in 2017
- Wolfe Video, the oldest and largest exclusive producer and distributor of LGBT films in North America
- Wolfe (TV series), a British television police procedural released in 2021

== See also ==
- Wolfe City, Texas, United States, a city
- Wolf
- Wolff
- Wolffe
- Woolfe
