= Frank Wolfe =

Frank Wolfe may refer to:

- Frank Delos Wolfe (1863–1926), architect in California
- Frank Wolfe (before 1868–after 1906), English footballer in 1886–87 Royal Arsenal F.C. season
- Frank Wolfe (fictional character), see List of American Pickers episodes

== See also ==
- Frank–Wolfe algorithm, an optimization algorithm
- Frank Wolf (disambiguation)
- Francis Wolfe (disambiguation)
- Wolfe (surname)
