= Alfred Wolf =

Alfred Wolf may refer to:

- Alfred Wolf (sailor) (1923–1943), United States Navy sailor
  - USS Alfred Wolf, a proposed World War II United States Navy John C. Butler-class destroyer escort
- Alfred Wolf (rabbi) (1915–2004), German-born American rabbi
- Alfred P. Wolf (1923–1998), American nuclear and organic chemist
