= WLI =

WLI may refer to:

- Wang Laboratories
- Wolfe Laboratories
- USCG inland buoy tenders
- Oracle WebLogic Integration
- white light interferometry
- Whole Life Insurance
- Welling railway station
