= Jack Wolfe =

Jack Wolfe may refer to:

- John Thomas Wolfe (1955–1995), Canadian politician
- Jack A. Wolfe (1936–2005), American paleontologist
- Jack Wolfe (artist) (1924–2007), American artist
- Jack Wolfe (actor) (born 1995), English actor

== See also ==
- John Wolfe (disambiguation)
