= USS Wolf =

USS Wolf may refer to:

- USS Wolf (1776), a US Navy gunship used in the American Civil War
- USS Alfred Wolf (DE-544), a United States Navy destroyer escort cancelled during construction in 1944
- USS Donald W. Wolf (APD-129), formerly DE-713, a United States Navy destroyer escort converted during construction into a high-speed transport, commissioned from 1945 to 1946

== See also ==
- USS Wolffish (SS-434)
- USS Seawolf
