= Henry Wulff =

Henry Wulff may refer to:

- Henry Wulff (Iowa politician) (born 1943)
- Henry Wulff (Illinois politician) (1854–1907)

== See also ==
- Henry Wolf (disambiguation)
- Henry Wolff (disambiguation)
