= Edward Wolfe (disambiguation) =

Edward Wolfe (1685–1759) was a British Army officer.

Edward Wolfe may also refer to:

- Edward Wolfe (RAF officer) (1911–1994), Battle of Britain pilot
- Edward H. Wolfe (1834–1916), American Civil War brevet general
- Ed Wolfe (1929–2009), American baseball player
- Edward Wolfe (artist) (1897–1982), British artist
- Edward Wolfe (police officer) (1875-1952), British colonial police officer and member of the Legislative Council of Hong Kong (1919-1935)
- Edward Wolfe (rugby union)

== See also ==
- Edward Wolff (disambiguation)
