= Wolfson =

See also Woolf, Woolfe, Wolfe, Wolff, Wolfson and Woolfson (especially for family names).

Wolfson or Volfson is a Jewish surname, and may refer to:

- Alice Wolfson, American activist and attorney who specializes in women's health
- David Wolfson, Baron Wolfson of Sunningdale (1935–2021), British politician and businessman, nephew of Isaac Wolfson, former chairman of GUS and Next
- Dik Wolfson (born 1933), Dutch economist, politician and civil servant
- Elliot R. Wolfson, professor of Hebrew and Judaic studies at New York University
- Elijah Wolfson, (born 1985) American writer and editor
- Evan Wolfson, (born 1957), prominent American civil rights attorney and advocate
- Freda L. Wolfson (born 1954), United States District Judge in New Jersey
- Harry Austryn Wolfson, (1887–1974), professor of literature and philosophy at Harvard
- Ilia Volfson (born 1981), Russian politician
- Isaac Wolfson, (1897–1991), British businessman and philanthropist, former chairman of GUS
- Janet Wolfson de Botton (born 1952), British art collector and bridge player
- Leonard Wolfson, Baron Wolfson, (1927–2010), British businessman, son of Isaac Wolfson, former chairman of GUS
- Louis Wolfson, (1912–2007), Wall Street financier and a major thoroughbred race horse owner and breeder
- Louis Wolfson, (born 1931), American author who writes in French
- Margaret Wolfson, American storyteller and writer
- Mark Wolfson (1934–2018), British politician
- Mitchell Wolfson, Jr., (born 1939), businessman and founder of the Wolfsonian Museum
- P. J. Wolfson (1903–1979), American writer, screenwriter, and film producer
- Richard Wolfson (musician), (1955–2005), British musician and journalist
- Richard Wolfson (physicist)
- Simon Wolfson, Baron Wolfson of Aspley Guise (born 1967), son of David Wolfson, chairman of clothing retailer Next
- Theresa Wolfson, (1897–1972), labor activist and educator
- Tracy Wolfson (born 1975), sports reporter
- Zev Wolfson (1928-2012) Jewish businessman and philanthropist

Woolfson is another variation of this surname, and may refer to:

- Eric Woolfson (1945–2009), Scottish singer and producer
- Luke de Woolfson (born 1976), English actor
- Michael Woolfson (1927–2019), British physicist
