= Gary Wolfe =

Gary Wolfe may refer to:

- Gary K. Wolfe, science fiction editor, critic and biographer
- Gary Wolfe (wrestler)

== See also ==
- Gary Wolf (disambiguation)
- Wolfe (surname)
