= John Wolfe =

John Wolfe may refer to:

- John Wolfe (printer) (1548?–1601), English bookseller and printer
- John Wolfe, 2nd Viscount Kilwarden (1769–1830), Irish peer
- Jack A. Wolfe (1936–2005), American paleontologist
- John Bascom Wolfe (1904–1988), American social and behavioral psychologist
- John Clay Wolfe (born 1972), American radio personality and entrepreneur
- John Wolfe Jr. (born 1954), Tennessee politician
- John P. Wolfe (born 1970), American chemist
- John Richard Wolfe (1832-1915), Irish missionary who served in China
- John Thomas Wolfe (1955–1995), veterinarian and Canadian provincial politician
- John T. Wolfe Jr. (born 1942), president of Savannah State College
- John Wolfe (priest), Irish Anglican priest
- John Wolfe (rugby union), Australian international rugby union player

== See also ==
- John Wolfe Barry (1836–1918), English civil engineer
- Jack Wolfe (disambiguation)
- John Wolf (disambiguation)
