= Senator Wolf =

Senator Wolf or Wolfe may refer to:

- Clarence Wolf (1860–1937), Pennsylvania State Senate
- Dan Wolf (born 1957), Massachusetts State Senate
- Katie Wolf (1925–2020), Indiana State Senate
- Kay Wolf (born 1949), Kansas State Senate
- Louis Wolf (1825–1887), Wisconsin State Senate
- Pam Wolf (born 1963), Minnesota State Senate
- William P. Wolf (1833–1896), Iowa State Senate
- Edward I. Wolfe (1860–1922), California State Senate
- Jay Wolfe (born 1963), West Virginia State Senate
- Simeon K. Wolfe (1824–1888), Indiana State Senate
- Stephen Wolfe (fl. 1960s–1980s), Oklahoma State Senate

== See also ==
- Senator Wolff (disambiguation)
