= Robert Koch (disambiguation) =

Robert Koch (1843–1910) was a German physician.

Robert Koch may also refer to:

- Robert Koch (film), a 1939 German historical drama film
- Robert Koch (footballer) (born 1986), German footballer
- Robert Koch Woolf (1923–2004), American interior decorator
- Bobby Koch (born 1960), American politician
- Robot Koch (born 1977), stage name for Robert Koch, a German, Los Angeles based electronic band

== See also ==
- Koch (disambiguation)
