= Charles Wolfe (disambiguation) =

Charles Wolfe (1791–1823) was an Irish poet.

Charles Wolfe may also refer to:

- Charles Eugene Wolfe Jr., American professional wrestler, better known by his ring name Gino Hernandez
- Charles D. Wolfe, mayor of Williamsport, Pennsylvania, 1908–1911
- Charlie Wolfe (1892–1966), Australian rules footballer who played with South Melbourne
- Charles K. Wolfe (1943–2006), professor of English who documented American vernacular music
- Charlie Wolfe, musician on We Are All One

== See also ==
- Chuck Wolfe (disambiguation)
- Charles Wolf (disambiguation)
