= Edward Wolff (disambiguation) =

Edward Wolff is an American economist.

Ed or Edward Wolff may also refer to:

- Ed Wolff (actor), actor in The Phantom Creeps and The Colossus of New York
- Edward Wolff (composer) of "24 Études en forme de Préludes", Op. 20, which is music written in all 24 major and minor keys

== See also ==
- Edward Wolfe (disambiguation)
