= Alfred P. Wolf =

American chemist

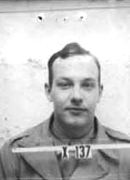
Alfred P. Wolf c. 1941.

Alfred P. Wolf (February 13, 1923 – December 17, 1998) was an American nuclear and organic chemist. Wolf was chairman of the Chemistry Department at Brookhaven National Laboratory, research professor in the Department of Psychiatry at New York University a member of the National Academy of Sciences, The Journal of Nuclear Medicine said that his "discoveries were instrumental in the development of positron emission tomography (PET)" and that he "made pioneering contributions over nearly 50 years in the field of organic radiochemistry". The New York Times said that Wolf "helped create some of today's most sophisticated diagnostic tools" and that he "advanced the field of organic radiochemistry, radiopharmacology and nuclear medicine" throughout his career of 50 years. The National Academy of Sciences said that "he pioneered the development of labeling techniques that used the reactions of hot atoms".

== Notable awards and distinctions ==
- 1971 the Nuclear Chemistry Award of the American Chemical Society
- 1981 the Society of Nuclear Medicine Paul Aebersold Award
- 1983 an honorary doctorate from the Faculty of Mathematics and Science at Uppsala University, Sweden.
- 1988 elected to the National Academy of Sciences
- 1991 the Hevesy Nuclear Medicine Pioneer Award
- 1997 the Melvin Calvin Award of the International Isotope Society

== Life and career ==
- 1923: born in Manhattan on February 13, 1923
- 1944: B.A., chemistry, Columbia University
- 1948: M.A., chemistry, Columbia University
- 1951: joined the Brookhaven National Laboratory
- 1952: Ph.D., chemistry, Columbia University
- 1957: senior chemist, the Brookhaven National Laboratory
- 1982: head of the Chemistry Department, the Brookhaven National Laboratory
