= Chuck Wolfe =

Chuck Wolfe may refer to:

- Chuck Wolfe (executive) (born 1961), LGBT rights activist
- Chuck Wolfe (baseball) (1897–1957), baseball pitcher

== See also ==
- Charles Wolfe (disambiguation)
