= Michael Wolf =

Michael Wolf may refer to:

- Michael Wolf (ice hockey) (born 1981), German ice hockey forward
- Michael Wolf (photographer) (1954–2019), German artist and photographer
- Michael Wolf (statistician) (born 1967), Chaired Professor at the University of Zurich
- Misisipi Mike Wolf, American singer, songwriter and musician

== See also ==
- Michael Wolfe (disambiguation)
- Michael Wolff (disambiguation)
