= Francis Wolfe =

Francis Wolfe may refer to:

- Francis Wolfe (writer), winner of Ann Connor Brimer Award
- Francis Wolfe (Royalist), associate of Richard Penderel
- Francis X. Wolfe, the pseudonym of director Francis Delia

== See also ==
- Frances Wolfe, actress
- Frank Wolfe (disambiguation)
- Francis Wolff, record company executive, photographer and producer
