= Wolfson (disambiguation) =

Wolfson is a surname.

Wolfson may also refer to:

- Wolfson College, University of Cambridge
- Wolfson College, University of Oxford
- Wolfson Building, a building of Somerville College, Oxford
- The Wolfson Foundation, founded by Isaac Wolfson
- Wolfson Microelectronics, an electronics company
- Samuel W. Wolfson High School, a public high school in Jacksonville, Florida
- Wolfson Children's Hospital, in Jacksonville, Florida
