= Hannes Wolf =

Hannes Wolf may refer to:

- Hannes Wolf (football manager) (born 1981), German football manager
- Hannes Wolf (footballer) (born 1999), Austrian footballer

== See also ==
- Hanns Wolf (1894–1968), German composer and pianist
