= Wilhelm Wolf =

Wilhelm Wolf may refer to:

- Wilhelm Wolff, 19th-century socialist
- Wilhelm Wulff, 20th-century occultist associated with The Occult Roots of Nazism
- Wilhelm Wolf, one of the Nazis who died in Hitler's Beer Hall Putsch
- Wilhelm Wolf (1897-1939), Nazi politician and last Austrian foreign minister before the Anschluss
- Ernst Wilhelm Wolf (1735-1792), German composer
- Friedrich Wilhelm Wolff, German sculptor
