= Michael Wolff =

Michael Wolff may refer to:

- Michael Wolff (graphic designer) (born 1933), British graphic designer, co-founder of Wolff Olins
- Michael Wolff (journalist) (born 1953), American author, essayist, and journalist
- Michael Wolff (musician) (born 1952), American jazz musician
- Michael A. Wolff (born 1945), Chief Justice of the Supreme Court of Missouri, Dean Emeritus of Saint Louis University School of Law

== See also ==
- Michael Wolf (disambiguation)
- Michael Wolfe (disambiguation)
