= Sebastian Wolf =

Sebastian Wolf may refer to:

- Sebastian Wolf (artist)
- Sebastian Wolf (footballer, born 1985), German footballer
- Sebastian Wolf (footballer, born 1993), German footballer

== See also ==
- Sebastião Wolf
- Sébastien Wolfe
