= Senator Wolff =

Senator Wolff may refer to:

- George W. Wolff (1848–1919), Wisconsin State Senate
- Joseph C. Wolff (1849–1896), New York State Senate
- Nelson Wolff (born 1940), Texas State Senate

== See also ==
- Senator Wolf (disambiguation)
