= Henry Wolff =

Henry Wolff may refer to:

- Henry Drummond Wolff (1830–1908), British diplomat and politician
- Henry Drummond Wolff (Basingstoke MP) (1899–1982), British politician
- Henry William Wolff (1840–1931), British co-operative activist
- Henry Wolff (Los Angeles, California; around 2000), known notable figure and socialite

== See also ==
- Henry Wolfe (born 1979), American musician and actor
- Henry Wolf (disambiguation)
- Henry Wulff (disambiguation)
