= Robert Wolf =

Robert Wolf may refer to:

- Robert Wolf (writer) (born c. 1944), American journalist and co-founder of Free River Press
- Robert Wolf (business) (born 1962), Chairman and CEO, UBS Group Americas, President and COO Investment Bank of UBS AG
- Robert Wolf (swimmer) (born 1971), Czech swimmer
- Robert A. Wolf (born 1961), American electronic musician and film composer

== See also ==
- Bob Woolf (1928–1993), American sports agent and lawyer
- Robert Koch Woolf (1923–2004), American interior decorator
- Robert Wolfe (disambiguation)
- Robert Wolff (disambiguation)
