= Robert Wolff =

Robert Wolff may refer to:

- Bobby Wolff (born 1932), American bridge player
- Bob Wolff (1920–2017), American sportscaster
- Robert Paul Wolff (1933–2025), American political philosopher
- Robert Jay Wolff (1905–1978), American abstract artist
- Robert Lee Wolff (1915–1980), American historian and book collector

== See also ==
- Robert Wolf (disambiguation)
- Robert Wolfe (disambiguation)
