= Wolfe (given name) =

Wolfe is a masculine given name. Notable people and characters with the name include:

== People ==
- Wolfe Bowart (born 1962), American comedian
- L. Wolfe Gilbert (1886–1970), Russian Empire-born American Tin Pan Alley songwriter
- Wolfe Glick (born 1995), American streamer and youtuber
- Wolfe Kelman (1923–1990), Austrian-born American rabbi
- Wolfe von Lenkiewicz (born 1966), British artist
- Wolfe Londoner (1842–1912), American politician
- Wolfe Mays (1912–2005), British philosopher
- Wolfe Morris (1925–1996), British film and television actor
- Wolfe Perry (born 1957), American actor and basketball player
- Wolfe Tone (1763–1798), Irish revolutionary
- Wolfe Wagner, Irish clergyman

== Characters ==
- Professor Wolfe Kinteh, a fictional forensic scientist from the TV series Wolfe

== See also ==
- Wolfe (disambiguation)
- Wolf (name), given name and surname
