= Thomas Wolf (criminal) =

Thomas Wolf (born in Düsseldorf), also known under the alias of David van Dyk (or David van Dyke), is a German criminal and was, until capture in May 2009, one of the most wanted fugitives in Germany for nine years.

== Escape ==
Having been repeatedly convicted (among other crimes, of bank robbery) and thus, oscillating between freedom and imprisonment, Wolf neglected to return to prison at the scheduled time after the 1999 Christmas release. On 20 April 2000, he was seen robbing a Commerzbank office in Altona, a district of Hamburg, netting about half a million EUR. Wolf's whereabouts were not known by the police for the next nine years except for numerous crimes associated with him, most of them committed in Germany but some also in Belgium and Netherlands.

== Kidnapping ==
According to police, on 27 March 2009 Wolf kidnapped the wife of a banker in Wiesbaden. He asked for a ransom of 1.8 million EUR, which the banker paid. Despite police surveillance, Wolf managed to leave with the money. He was, however, identified by testimony of the kidnapped wife, which led to reinvigoration of the hunt on him.

== New hunt and capture ==
After the kidnapping, police set a bounty of 40 000 EUR (and later, 100 000 EUR) for information leading to arrest of Wolf. Despite the bounty, Wolf's capture took three months. Wolf was found when he announced for a date on 16 May 2009 in Hamburger Abendblatt. Reportedly, he made strange demands to the woman who answered — in particular, he requested that she rent a room for him in her name and open a bank account for him in her name — which made her suspicious and led her to report the encounter to police. Subsequently, police located Wolf's cellphone, whose number he had given to his date, and arrested him on the Reeperbahn, after his departure from Lehmitz, a well-known pub.
