= Mary Wolf =

Mary Wolf may refer to:

- Mary B. Wolf (fl. 2000s), mayor of Williamsport, Pennsylvania, United States
- Mary Hunter Wolf (1904–2000), American theater director and producer

== See also ==
- Mary Wolfe (born 1963), member of the Iowa House of Representatives
