= Guido Wolf =

Guido Wolf may refer to:

- Guido Wolf (politician) (born 1961), German politician
- Guido Wolf (sport shooter) (born 1924), Liechtenstein sports shooter
