= Wolffe =

Wolffe is a surname of English and Jewish (Ashkenazic) origin. Variant of Wolf, Wolff or Wolfe . Notable people with the surname include:

- Alan Wolffe (1959–2001), British cell biologist
- Jabez Wolffe (1876–1943), British swimmer who attempted to swim the English Channel many times
- James Wolffe (born 1962), Scottish lawyer
- Richard Wolffe (born 1968), British-American journalist, MSNBC commentator and author
- Andrew Wolffe (born1964), Scottish Designer

== See also ==
- Eva de Wolffe, a character in the UK TV series Footballers' Wives
- Commander Wolffe, the clone CC-3636 who was the leader of the Wolfpack
- Wolf
- Wolfe (disambiguation)
- Wolff
- Woolf
