= Warren Wolf =

Warren Wolf may refer to:

- Warren Wolf (American football) (1927–2019), American high school football head coach and politician
- Warren Wolf (musician) (born 1979), American jazz vibraphonist
