= Thom Wolf =

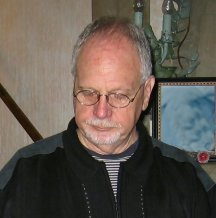
- Thom Wolf
- Born: July 9, 1944 (age 81); Houston, Texas, U.S.
- Occupations: social entrepreneur, author, editor, lecturer and leadership educator
- Spouse: Linda Wolf

Thom Wolf is international president and professor of global studies of University Institute, New Delhi, India, an Asia-based learning group in, servicing South and East Asia, Southeast Asia, Central Asia, the Middle East, and Europe. He is an International Fellow of Canyon Institute of Advanced Studies, Phoenix.

Wolf is a social entrepreneur, author and educator in the fields of international education and leadership. He has the B.A. Sociology, Baylor University, M.A. Cross-Cultural Studies, Fuller Graduate School; been awarded an honorary D.Lit. Humanities Grand Canyon University; and has earned a PhD (Global Leadership) Andrews University

Wolf designed several Master of Arts programs for US universities. Leadership engagement and lectures globally include the Universidad Autónoma del Estado de México[3], Harvard University, New York University, Indiana University, UCLA, the UC Berkeley, Princeton University, Stanford University, Kunming University (Yunan Province China), Delhi University, Lucknow, and UniversityAmerican University of Dubai. Kunming University (Yunan Province China).

His teachings have centered on the social, educational, and ethical dimensions of comparative worldviews. Informed by the "culture matters" school of thinking (Harrison, Berger, Etounga-Manguelle, Edgerton, Gordona, and others), Wolf is part of a growing international group of thinkers and activists (Omvedt, Mani, Mungekar, Jadhav, Sardar, Lall, Andrade and others) exploring the significance of the voice of Mahatma Jotirao Phule and wife Savitribai Phule, for the full development of contemporary India.

Wolf is author of India Progress-Prone, translated into Hindi and Marathi. His ideas have been published in the Far Eastern Economic Review, Journal of AC Leadership and elsewhere., and is co-author of Phule in His Own Words (2007, with Sunil Sardar), and of "Savitribai and India’s Conversation on Education" (2008, with Suzana Andrade).

His explorations of worshipviews/worldviews/worldvenues linkages have been published in Hindu/Buddhist and Hebrew/Christian Meditation: A Gender Studies Comparison (2006); Buddhism and the Contemporary World, "Three Challenges for Buddhism in the 21st century" (2007)[5]; and Buddhism in the 21st century, "Mahayana Buddhism: TippingPoint Buddhism" (release date 2009).

== Articles and Lectures ==
- GlobalShift: The New History Vectors
- Hindu/Buddhist and Hebrew/Christian Meditation: A Gender Studies Comparison
- Progress-Prone and Progress-Resistant Cultures: Worldview Issues
- Chair, 'International Practices of Buddhism' Session, 2550th Anniversary of Mahaparinirvana of the Buddha, at Bodhgaya, India, the birthplace of Buddhism. The International Conference "was organized by the Ministry at Bodh Gaya from 4th to 6th February, 2007 where eminent scholars from India and abroad presented a rich collection of papers on 'Buddha and the 21st century'".
- The Journal of Applied Christian Leadership
- World Christian Fellowship Newsletter
- Catching the Wave: the Shift from the Ordained to the Ordinary
- University of Mary Hardin-Baylor School of Business Distinguished Speaker Series 2006: GlobalShift: The New History Vectors. Other University Distinguished Speakers Series lecturers included Dr. Ken Blanchard (The One Minute Manager) and former USA President, the Honorable George H. W. Bush (2006).
- Baylor University, Lecture: Hindu/Buddhist and Hebrew/Christian Meditation: A Gender Studies Comparison (2006)
- Lucknow University, Sociology Department Lecture: Progress-Prone and Progress-Resistant Cultures: Worldview Issues (2006)
- Chair, International Practices of Buddhism Session, 2550th Anniversary of Mahaparinirvana of the Buddha, International Conference at Bodhgaya, India, the birthplace of Buddhism. A Conference of the Government of India, Ministry of Culture (2007)
- American University of Dubai, United Arab Emirates: Progress-Prone and Progress-Resistant Cultures: A Template for Research (2008)

== Publications ==
- India Progress-Prone 2nd edition (2008) ISBN 978-81-904351-3-0 (2008, translated into Hindi and Marathi)
- Buddhism and the Contemporary World (2007) ISBN 81-89640-30-5
- Phule in His Own Words (2007) 2nd Edition ISBN 978-81-904351-5-4 (with Sunil Sardar)
- Savitribai and India's Conversation on Education (2008) (with Suzana Andrade)
- Buddhism in the 21st century (release date 2009)
