= Harry Wolf =

Harry Wolf may refer to:

- Harry B. Wolf (1880–1944), American politician
- Harry Wolf (architect), American architect
- Harry L. Wolf (1908–1993), American cinematographer

== See also ==
- Henry Wolf (disambiguation)
- Harry DeWolf (1903–2000), Canadian naval officer
