= Wolfowitz =

Wolfowitz is a surname. Notable people with the surname include:

- Jacob Wolfowitz, (1910–1981) American statistician and information theorist
- Clare Selgin Wolfowitz (born 1945), American anthropologist
- Paul Wolfowitz, (born 1943) American political figure, son of Jacob
