= Volf =

Volf is both a surname and a given name. Notable people with the name include:

- Jaroslav Volf (born 1979), Czech slalom canoeist
- Josef Volf (1939–2025), Czech cyclist
- Karen Volf (1864–1946), Danish baker and pastry cook
- Miroslav Volf (born 1956), Croatian theologian
- Volf Roitman (1930–2010), Uruguayan painter, sculptor and architect
