= Edward Wolfe (rugby union) =

Irish rugby union player

- Full name: Edward John Wolfe
- Born: 4 August 1858 Monaghan, Ireland
- Died: 15 February 1933 (aged 74) Guernsey
- University: Trinity College Dublin
- Occupation: Priest

Rugby union career
- Position: Three-quarter
International career
Years	Team	Apps	(Points)
1882	Ireland	1	(0)

Edward John Wolfe (4 August 1858 — 15 February 1933) was an Irish priest and international rugby union player.

The son of an archdeacon, Wolfe was born in Monaghan and educated at Trinity College Dublin.

Wolfe played his rugby as a three-quarter and was capped once for Ireland, playing a match against England at Lansdowne Road in 1882. He also won an Irish Championship as a long jumper.

Ordained in 1883, Wolfe held curacies around Ulster over the next seven years, until moving to England. He was the vicar of St Thomas Church in Telford from 1903 to 1922 and in his final years was vicar at St. John's Church, Guernsey.

== See also ==
- List of Ireland national rugby union players
