= Jack Wolfe (artist) =

American painter (1924–2007)

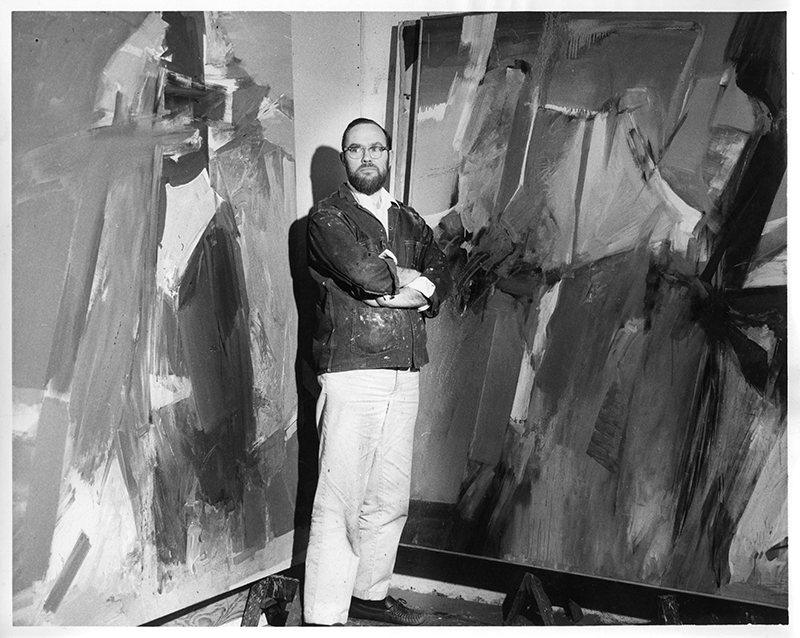
- Photograph of Jack Wolfe with the painting 'Pricota,' 1963
- Born: January 14, 1924
- Died: November 18, 2007 (aged 83)
- Education: Rhode Island School of Design; School of the Museum of Fine Arts, Boston
- Known for: Painting
- Website: jackwolfestudio.com

Jack Wolfe (14 January 1924 – 18 November 2007) was a 20th-century American painter most known for his abstract art, portraiture, and political paintings.

== Biography ==
=== Early life and education ===
Jack Wolfe was born in Omaha, Nebraska on January 14, 1924, to Blanche and Everett L. Wolfe. Soon after his birth, his family moved to Brockton, MA. At 18, Wolfe had an interest in commercial illustration, which he pursued at the Rhode Island School of Design (RISD). However, upon matriculating at RISD in 1942, he developed an interest in fine art and painting inspired by an exhibition of modern French art. He described this change of direction, explaining that, "One day, for the first time, I saw an exhibition of modern French art. It was like being struck by lightning." He became particularly interested in the work of a number of European modernists, including Rouault, Cézanne, Braque, Modigliani, and Picasso. Following his time at RISD, he pursued a Master's in Fine Arts degree at the Museum of Fine Arts School in Boston, MA. At the Museum School, Wolfe studied under the renowned Expressionist Karl Zerbe, a German-born artist who was the Museum School's most influential and vital teacher until 1953. After graduating from the Museum School, Wolfe was represented by the Margaret Brown Gallery in Boston, which also represented many other cutting edge Moderns that defied the more conservative tastes of New England collectors at the time, including György Kepes, Congur Metcalf, and Alexander Calder.

=== Career and Museum Representation ===
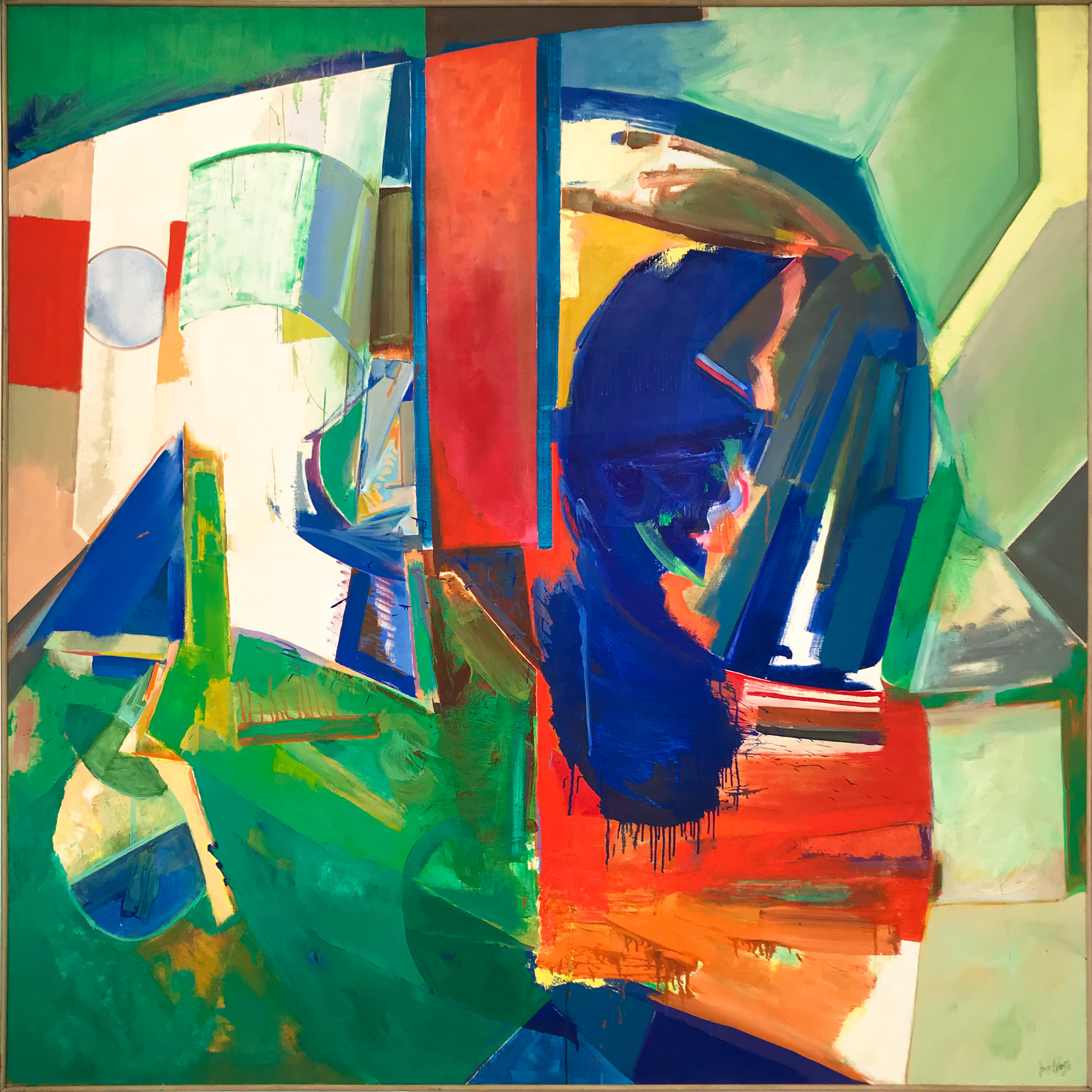
Jack Wolfe's painting "Robin's Rock" 1962, 72" x 72"

Jack Wolfe's artwork received early recognition from a number of organizations and was consistently featured in influential exhibitions, including the 1955 Carnegie International at the Carnegie Institute in Pittsburgh, PA, the American Federation of Art's traveling exhibition New Talent in the USA in 1956–57, the Whitney Museum's Young America exhibition in 1957, the Boston Institute of Contemporary Art's Selection exhibition in 1957, and both the Whitney Museum's 1958 Annual exhibition and its Forty Artists Under Forty show in 1962–63. In 1959, his widely acclaimed Portrait of Abraham Lincoln toured Europe in a show circulated by the Institute of Contemporary Art, Boston. In addition, his painting Crucifixion was chosen by the United States Information Agency to be exhibited across Europe, including being shown at the Salzburg Biennial in Austria in 1958. Crucifixion was also exhibited at the Whitney Museum and subsequently displayed in the National Cathedral in Washington, DC, in 1958. In 1966–67, his work was selected for Art for Embassies by the U.S. State Department. He received the first annual Margaret Brown Memorial Award for high achievement by a New England Artist from the Institute of Contemporary Art, Boston, in 1958.

With his future as one of the great artists of his time laid out neatly before him, Wolfe moved to New York in the early 1950s, which was then the postwar epicenter of the art world and in the midst of experiencing the first real revolution in American Art, now known as Abstract Expressionism. However, almost immediately upon his arrival, he became disenfranchised with the overtly commercial nature of the art scene there, spurning fame and security in an unwillingness to bend his creative vision to the expectations of others. After four short months, he left New York, returned to Massachusetts where he bought property in Stoughton, cleared the land, and built both his home and studio with his own two hands. He would go on to live and paint there, extensively exhibiting and garnering constant critical acclaim.

Wolfe became one of the earliest artists championed by the deCordova Museum in Lincoln, MA and the Institute of Contemporary Art in Boston. He was awarded a traveling scholarship in 1958, which allowed him to set up studio in San Miguel de Allende, Mexico and then in San Francisco, California. Upon his return in 1959, the deCordova museum hosted Wolfe's third solo exhibition, featuring work made during his time in California.

Following his travels, Wolfe returned to Massachusetts, where he supported himself both through his artwork and with several different jobs, including working as a truck driver, carpenter, and laborer. He even designed silverware chests and at one point worked as a restorer alongside artist Gustav Klimann. In a review of his first solo show, a critic wrote: "It seems odd that such sensitive work is done by a painter who must spend part time driving a truck." Wolfe began to become associated with a group of artists known as the Boston Expressionists. His work combined abstract expressionist, cubist and hard-edge techniques, often exploring geometry and depth with a highly saturated and unusual color palette. In addition to abstract works, he was equally interested in portraiture, and painted many portraits from life. His portraiture was shown in a well-received joint exhibition with Elaine de Kooning in 1965.

=== Legacy ===
While working from his studio in Stoughton, MA, Wolfe continued to participate in many exhibitions, with his abstract art, political paintings, and portraits featured in museums across the United States. In 1999, his work was featured in an exhibition at the Danforth Museum, titled "Jack Wolfe - Outside the Mainstream". In addition, his large scale political paintings were displayed in a 2005 show titled "Jack Wolfe - Major Political Work from Six Decades of Paintings" at the University of Massachusetts, Boston. His estate is represented by CK Contemporary in San Francisco, CA.

Wolfe's art continues to be represented within private and museum collections, including the Whitney Museum of American Art, the Boston Museum of Fine Arts, the Phoenix Art Museum, the Rose Art Museum, the deCordova Museum, the Worcester Art Museum, and the Addison Gallery of American Art. His portraiture is represented in the collections of many Boston-area institutions, including Boston University, Harvard University, Tufts University, and the University of Massachusetts, Boston. He died of cancer, in 2007, at the age of 83.

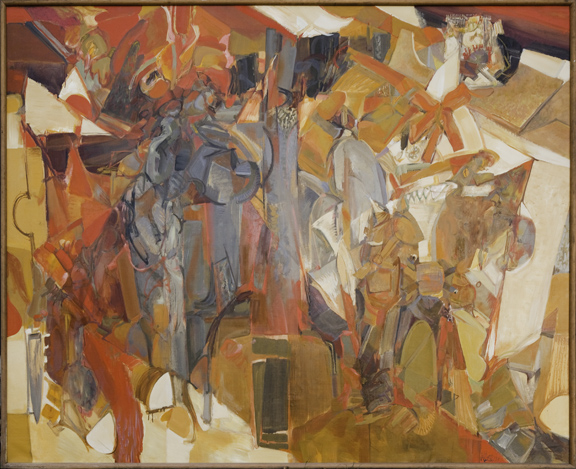
Chorus, J. Wolfe, 1959, oil, 78" x 96"

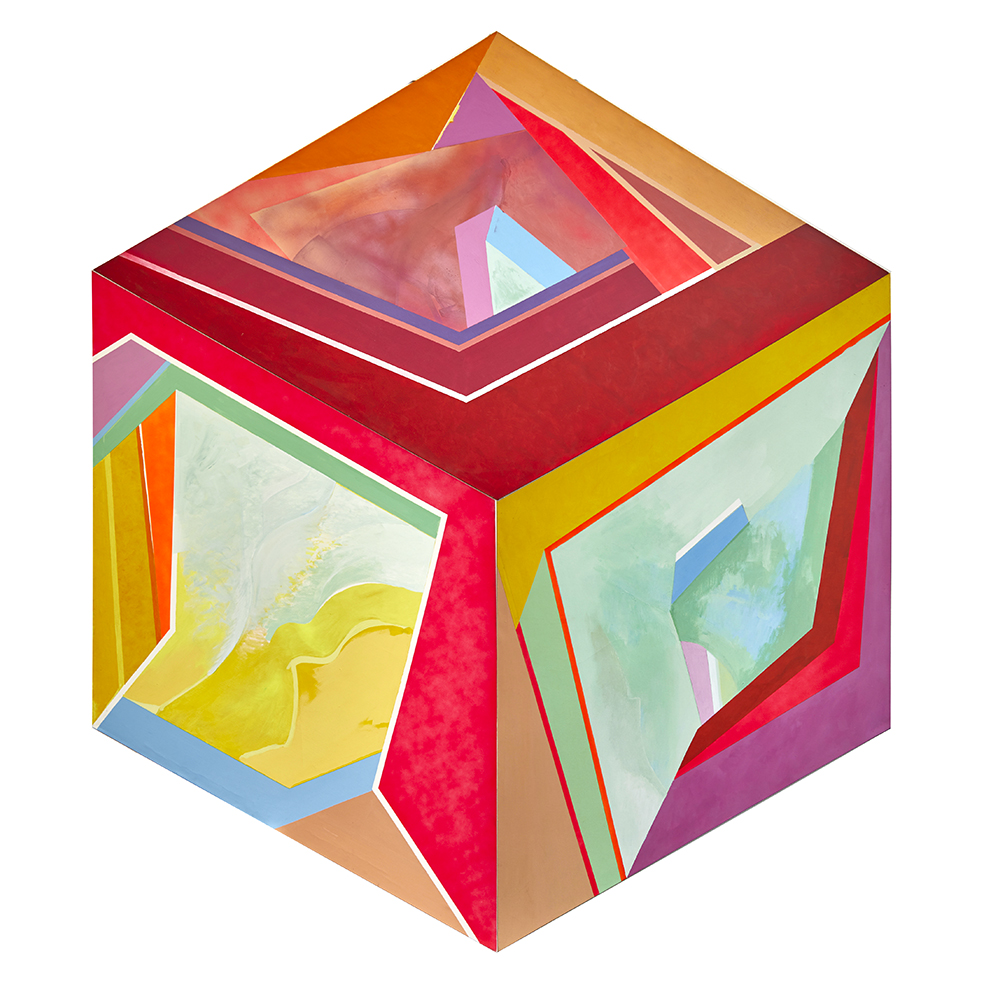
Tsar, J. Wolfe, 1971, acrylic, 104" x 120"

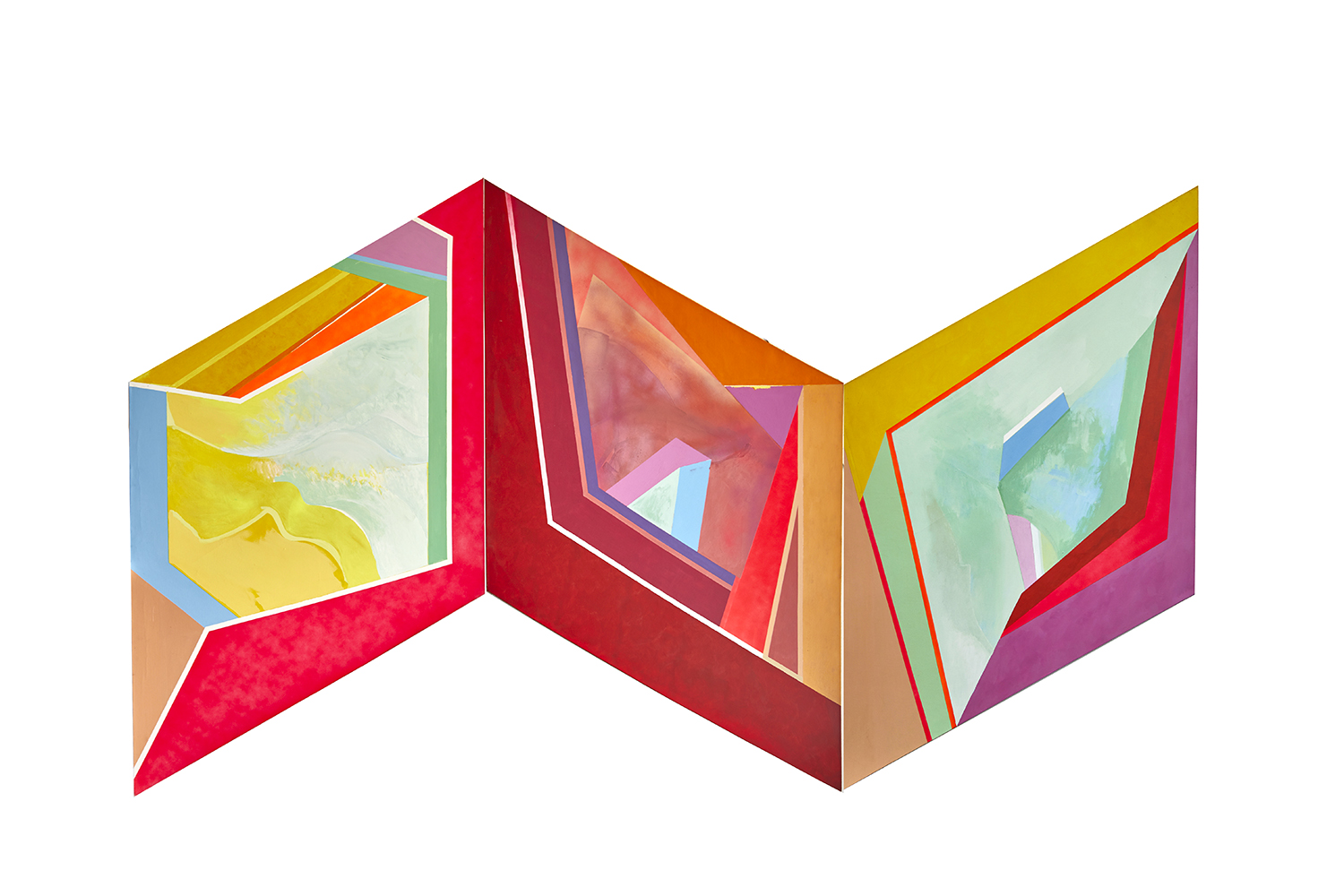
Tsar (extended), J. Wolfe, 1971, acrylic, 104" x 120"

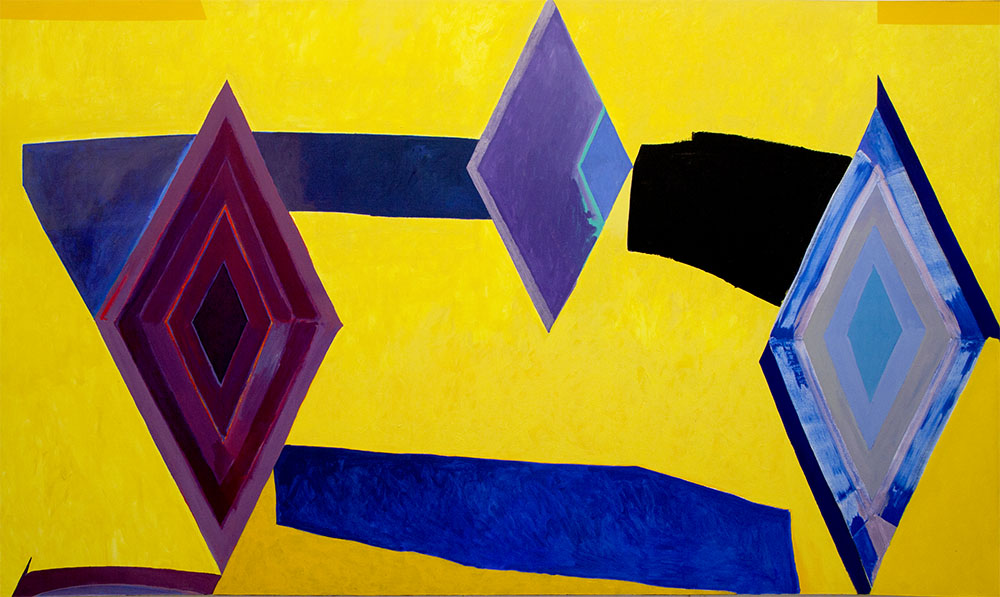
Cantos de Chile #3 (por Allende), J. Wolfe, 1977, acrylic, 72" x 120"
