= John Wolfe (priest) =

Irish Anglican priest

John Charles Wolfe
- Born: 12 May 1815; Dublin
- Died: 1 April 1871 (aged 55)
- Education: Trinity College, Dublin
- Occupation: Priest

John Charles Wolfe (12 May 1815 – 4 January 1871) was an Irish Anglican priest.

Wolfe was born in Dublin and educated at Trinity College, Dublin. After curacies at Tessauran and Donagh he was the Rector at Ematris from 1850 to 1865. He was Archdeacon of Clogher from 1872 to 1875.
