= Edward Wolfe (RAF officer) =

Edward Chatham Wolfe
- Nickname: Ron
- Born: 11 June 1911; Hong Kong
- Died: 19 April 1994 (aged 82)
- Allegiance: United Kingdom
- Branch: Royal Air Force
- Rank: Wing Commander
- Conflicts: World War II: Battle of Britain
- Awards: Distinguished Flying Cross

Wing Commander Edward Chatham Wolfe DFC (11 June 1911 – 19 April 1994) was a famed World War II Royal Air Force fighter pilot who flew during the Battle of Britain.

== Early life ==
Wolfe was born in Hong Kong on 11 June 1911, the son of the Hon E D C Wolfe, Inspector General of the Royal Hong Kong Police and Chief Officer of the Hong Kong Fire Brigade. He was educated at Grange School, Folkestone and Tonbridge School in Kent. Between 1929 and 1932, Wolfe worked as an apprentice with Merryweather and Sons (Fire-Engineers) at Greenwich, London, before working in the head office as a salesman and later as a fire prevention officer.

Aged sixteen, Wolfe took a ten-minute 'joy-ride' flight in a Vickers Virginia over Andover. This flight resolved his ambition to become a pilot.

== Royal Air Force ==
Wolfe joined the Royal Air Force Volunteer Reserve on 4 March 1935 as an Aiman/untrained pilot. He undertook flying training at No. 1 Elementary Flying Training School at Hatfield. He was promoted to a Sergeant on 18 March 1935.

Wolfe took up a short service commission in January 1936 and was sent to No. 4 Elementary Flying Training School RAF at Brough on 23 February as an acting Pilot Officer to complete his 'ab initio' training. He received his Civil Pilot 'A' Licence (No. 9179) on 5 March 1936, before posting to No. 9 Flying Training School RAF at RAF Thornaby and gaining his RAF wings on 30 July 1936.

Wolfe joined No. 64 Squadron RAF at RAF Martlesham Heath on 11 October 1936, flying the Hawker Demon aircraft, attending the Officers Parachute Course at RAF Manston, Kent on 23 August 1936. He was promoted to Pilot Officer on 27 January 1937. He became the Flight Commander of 'B Flight' of 64 Sqn in May 1938 and promoted to Acting Flight Lieutenant. He was appointed Squadron Adjutant in December 1938.

In October 1938, Wolfe was posted to No. 219 Squadron RAF at RAF Catterick, Yorks as 'B' Flight Commander, flying the Blenheim Mk 1 for night-fighting duties. By the start of the Battle of Britain in July 1940, Wolfe was flying with Plt Off Howard Duart, in Red Section. Most of his patrols took place in the Catterick area, combined with training exercises, gun firing and time on the Link Trainer.

Wolfe was promoted to substantive Flight Lieutenant on 3 September 1940 and was transferred to command No. 141 Squadron RAF at RAF Turnhouse, part of No. 11 Group RAF. The squadron was flying the Defiant aircraft and it was Wolfe's role to turn it into a night-fighting squadron following its poor day fighter role. He crewed with Sergeant Alfred Ashcroft as his regular gunner, a partnership that would last for the next two years. He was promoted to Acting Squadron Leader 6 October 1940. In April 1941 141 Sqn moved to RAF Ayr in Scotland as part of No. 13 Group RAF.

Wolfe was recommended for an immediate DFC by the new commanding officer at Ayr, which was approved by Air Marshal Sholto-Douglas on 14 May 1941. The recommendation read:

On the night of 6/7 th May 1941, S/Ldr Wolfe was on patrol over Glasgow when he sighted an enemy aircraft. He immediately closed to the attack while ordering his air-gunner to withhold fire until they were within 20yds of their objective. His courage and determination in closing with the enemy to such short-range enabled him to remain 'in formation' while the enemy carried out evasive action, thus bringing his combat to a successful conclusion. The enemy aircraft still carrying a full load of bombs crashed to the ground and burst into flames. This officer has completed 174 hours night-flying since the outbreak of war during which time he has carried out no less than 40 operational flights by night. Since assuming command of 141 Squadron in September 1940 he has always shown great determination, skill and courage and his leadership has undoubtedly imbued his pilots with the same characteristics.

Wolfe's gunner Ashcroft was commissioned in November 1941, and on 1 December, Wolfe was made a Temporary Squadron Leader.

On 27 March 1942, Wolfe was promoted to acting Wing Commander and took command of No. 456 Squadron RAAF at RAF Valley flying Beaufighter MkII's in a night-fighting role, taking Ashcroft with him as his Air-Gunner. Although primarily a night-fighter unit, the squadron also supplemented the day fighters on convoy patrols. The squadron was re-equipped with the de Havilland Mosquito in December 1942, which Wolfe flew for 51 hours before he was sent to the 8th War Staff Course at RAF Staff College, Bulstrode Park near Gerrards Cross. Following successful completion of this course, he was posted No. 62 OTU at RAF Ouston as the Chief Flying Instructor.

In August 1943, Wolfe was sent to Orlando, Florida, for a short course at the United States Air Force Staff College, being followed by six weeks at the Command and General Staff School at Fort Leavenworth, Kansas where he gained a Diploma.

On his return to the UK in November 1943, Wolfe was appointed Operations Staff Officer at Headquarters No. 85 Group RAF, TAF at RAF Uxbridge, moving to Headquarters No. 13 Group RAF (Communications) at RAF Inverness as Operations Staff Officer and Training Staff Officer on 18 May 1944. On 1 July 1944, Wolfe was promoted to Temporary Wing Commander and attended an Aviation medicine Course at RAF Farnborough on 31 July. In May 1945, he went to Headquarters of No. 88 Group RAF in Norway for Staff work, receiving a Mention in Dispatches on 8 June whilst flying with No. 132 Wing RAF part of No. 13 Group RAF. On 17 November 1945, Wolfe was awarded the Norwegian Liberation Cross by King Haakon VII of Norway for his services in No. 88 Group RAF.

Wolfe was released from the Royal Air Force on 17 December 1945 retaining the rank of Wing Commander. By then he had flown thirty six different types of aircraft and had 2018 flying hours.

Edward Wolfe died in 1994.
