= Frank Wolf =

Frank Wolf may refer to:

- Frank Wolf (adventurer) (born 1970), Canadian environmentalist
- Frank Wolf (politician) (born 1939), U.S. representative
- Frank C. Wolf, member of the Illinois House of Representatives
- Frank N. Wolf (1897–1949), American football and basketball player

== See also ==
- Frank Wolfe (disambiguation)
