= Michael Wolf (statistician) =

Swiss statistician (born 1967)

- Born: June 1, 1967 (age 59); Germany
- Movement: Econometrics, statistics

Academic background
- Education: Stanford University

Academic work
- Institutions: University of Zurich
- Notable ideas: Shrinkage Estimation of Covariance Matrices; Subsampling; and Multiple Testing.
- Website: www.econ.uzh.ch/faculty/wolf.html; Information at IDEAS / RePEc

Michael Wolf (born June 1, 1967) holds the Chair of Econometrics and Applied Statistics in the Department of Economics at the University of Zurich, Switzerland. He was previously Professor at UCLA, Charles III University of Madrid, and Pompeu Fabra University.

== Biography ==
Wolf was born in Germany, where he obtained a bachelor's degree in mathematics from the University of Augsburg. From 1991 he studied statistics at Stanford University (M.Sc. 1995, Ph.D. 1996).

Wolf is known for his work on shrinkage estimation of large-dimensional covariance matrices. While originally motivated by Markowitz portfolio selection, the linear shrinkage estimator he developed in collaboration with Olivier Ledoit has been widely adopted by other researchers in a variety of scientific fields such as cancer research, chemistry, civil engineering, climatology, electrical engineering, genetics, geology, neuroscience, psychology, speech recognition, etc. The common feature between these applications is that the dimension of the covariance matrix is not negligible with respect to the size of the sample. In this case the usual estimator, the sample covariance matrix, is inaccurate and ill-conditioned. By contrast, the Ledoit-Wolf estimator is more accurate and guaranteed to be well-conditioned, even in the difficult case where matrix dimension exceeds sample size.

Michael Wolf also co-wrote the book on Subsampling, a resampling method inspired by the jackknife that constitutes an alternative to the bootstrap. In the field of multiple testing, he introduced new procedures to control the family-wise error rate that are more powerful than previous methods, by taking into account the dependence between test statistics. He also worked on procedures to control generalized error rates, such as the generalized family-wise error rate, the false discovery proportion and the false discovery rate.

Michael Wolf served on the editorial board of the Annals of Statistics and Statistics and Probability Letters. In 2004, he won the Distinguished Researcher award from the Generalitat of Catalonia. He was invited to give the prestigious Gumbel Lecture at the Annual Meeting of the German Statistical Society in Cologne in 2008.

== Selected publications ==
Books

- Politis, Dimitris N.; Romano, Joseph P.; Wolf, Michael (1999). Subsampling. Springer Series on Statistics. ISBN 978-0-387-98854-2.

Articles on Shrinkage Estimation of Covariance Matrices

- Ledoit, Olivier; Wolf, Michael (December 2003). "Improved estimation of the covariance matrix of stock returns with an application to portfolio selection" (PDF). Journal of Empirical Finance. 10 (5): 603–621. doi:10.1016/S0927-5398(03)00007-0. hdl:10016/10089. S2CID 14422126. Archived from the original (PDF) on December 5, 2014.
- Ledoit, Olivier; Wolf, Michael (February 2004). "A well-conditioned estimator for large-dimensional covariance matrices" (PDF). Journal of Multivariate Analysis. 88 (2): 365–411. doi:10.1016/S0047-259X(03)00096-4. hdl:10016/10087. Archived from the original (PDF) on December 5, 2014.
- Ledoit, Olivier; Wolf, Michael (Summer 2004). "Honey, I shrunk the sample covariance matrix" (PDF). The Journal of Portfolio Management. 30 (4): 110–119. doi:10.3905/jpm.2004.110. hdl:10230/560. S2CID 219237399. Archived from the original (PDF) on January 21, 2015.

Articles on Subsampling

- Romano, Joseph P.; Wolf, Michael (September 2001). "Subsampling intervals in autoregressive models with linear time trend" (PDF). Econometrica. 69 (5): 1283–1314. doi:10.1111/1468-0262.00242. hdl:10016/6400. Archived from the original (PDF) on September 23, 2015.
- Gonzalo, Jesús; Wolf, Michael (August 2005). "Subsampling inference in threshold autoregressive models" (PDF). Journal of Econometrics. 127 (2): 201–224. doi:10.1016/j.jeconom.2004.08.004. hdl:10016/3218. Archived from the original (PDF) on January 21, 2015.

Articles on Multiple Testing

- Romano, Joseph P.; Wolf, Michael (March 2005). "Exact and approximate stepdown methods for multiple hypothesis testing" (PDF). Journal of the American Statistical Association. 100 (469): 94–108. doi:10.1198/016214504000000539. hdl:10230/576. S2CID 219594470. Archived from the original (PDF) on January 21, 2015.
- Romano, Joseph P.; Wolf, Michael (July 2005). "Stepwise multiple testing as formalized data snooping" (PDF). Econometrica. 73 (4): 1237–1282. doi:10.1111/j.1468-0262.2005.00615.x. hdl:10230/1216. Archived from the original (PDF) on January 21, 2015.
- Romano, Joseph P.; Wolf, Michael (August 2007). "Control of generalized error rates in multiple testing" (PDF). Annals of Statistics. 35 (4): 1378–1408. arXiv:0710.2258. doi:10.1214/009053606000001622. S2CID 14195701. Archived from the original (PDF) on January 21, 2015.
