= Woolfe (surname) =

Woolfe is a surname. Notable people with the surname include:

- Eric Woolfe, actor and artistic director in Toronto
- Harry Bruce Woolfe (1880–1965), English film producer in the 1920s–30s
- John Woolfe (1932–1969), British racing driver
- Kevin Woolfe (1930–2002), Australian rugby player in the 1950s
- Nathan Woolfe (born 1988), English footballer
- Richard Woolfe (born 1962), TV producer and senior executive in British broadcasting
- Steven Woolfe (born 1967), British politician
- Sue Woolfe (born 1950), Australian writer
- Zachary Woolfe, American classical music critic

Fictional people

- Syd Woolfe, in Emmerdale, a British soap opera

== See also ==
- Woolf (surname)
