= Michael Wolfe (disambiguation) =

Michael Wolfe (born 1945) is an American poet and writer.

Michael Wolfe or Mike Wolfe is also the name of:

- Michael Wolfe (filmmaker) (born 1976), American actor, writer, producer and director
- Michael Wolfe (politician) (born 1982), city councillor for Richmond, BC, Canada
- Mike Wolfe (born 1964), creator and star of the TV show American Pickers
- Mike Wolfe (politician), former mayor of Stoke-on-Trent, England

== See also ==
- Michael Wolf (disambiguation)
- Michael Wolff (disambiguation)
