= Marianne Wolfe =

- Born: 1926; Pittsburgh, Pennsylvania, United States
- Died: 2006 (aged 79–80)
- Education: Swarthmore College
- Occupation: ordained Presbyterian elder
- Known for: parliamentarian, Presbyterian Church (U.S.A.)
- Notable work: Presbyterian parliamentary law
- Awards: C. Fred Jenkins Award (2003)

Marianne Wolfe (1926–2006) was the preeminent parliamentarian in the Presbyterian Church (U.S.A.) during the second half of the 20th century.

== Biography ==
Wolfe was born in Pittsburgh in 1926. She graduated from Swarthmore College in 1950. She was an ordained Presbyterian elder and served as the moderator of the Pittsburgh Presbytery 1973.

Wolfe was a Professional Registered Parliamentarian from 1970 until her death in 2006. She literally wrote the book on Presbyterian parliamentary law. Her published works included the chapter on church polity in 1992's Encyclopedia of the Reformed Faith and Parliamentary Law for the Presbyterian Church (1983). She also wrote a teaching curriculum for new members, Members Together (1976) and a book on the Presbyterian elder (1991). She was the first recipient of the C. Fred Jenkins Award in 2003, being honored by the Presbyterian Church's Association of Stated Clerks for her contributions to the polity and parliamentary law of the denomination.

Wolfe served on the board of directors of Pittsburgh Theological Seminary from 1978 until her death, being the first woman to be elected chair of that board.
