= Charles Wolf =

Charles Wolf may refer to:

- Charles Wolf (astronomer) (1827–1918), French astronomer
- Charles Wolf (basketball) (1926–2022), American basketball coach
- Charles Wolf Jr. (1924–2016), senior economic advisor at the RAND Corporation
- Charlie Wolf (born 1959), British radio DJ

== See also ==
- Charles Wolfe (disambiguation)
- Charles de Wolff (1932–2011), Dutch organist and conductor
- Charles Esmond de Wolff (1893−1986), British Army officer
