= Friedrich Wilhelm Wolff =

German sculptor and journalist

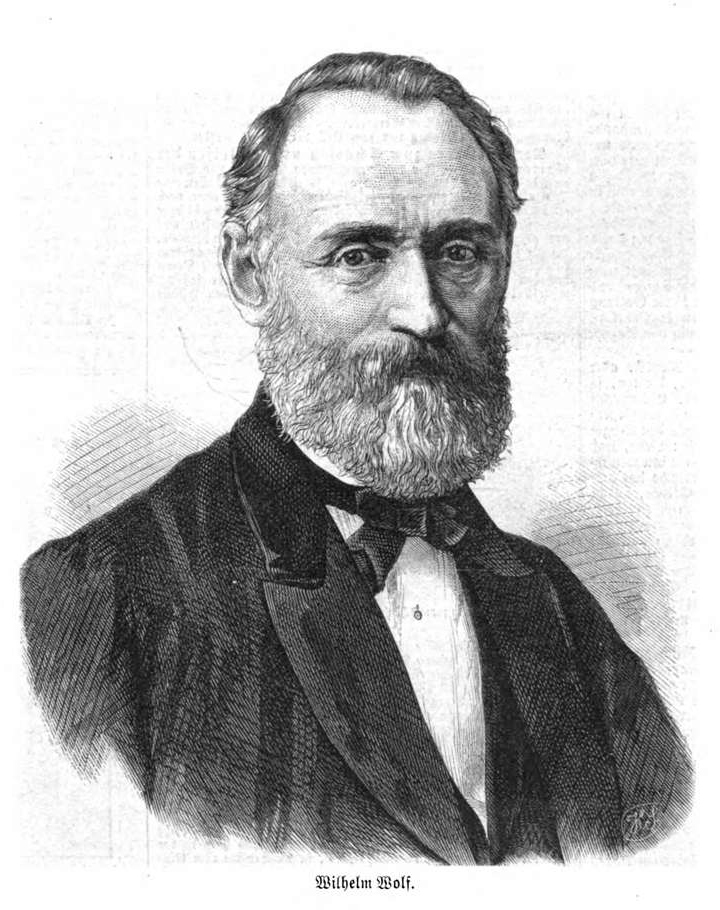

Friedrich Wilhelm Wolff (1816 – 1887) was a German sculptor and journalist who specialized in the depiction of animals in metal giving him the nickname of "Tier-Wolff".

Wolff was born on April 6, 1816 in Fehrbellin. He was a son of a tailor, Wolff became an apprentice mechanical engineer at the Royal Foundry at Berlin from 1830 to 1832 and then at the Königliche Gewerbeinstitut. The director of the latter institute, Peter Beuth, helped him with a scholarship to study under Louis Claude Ferdinand Soyer (1785-1854) at Paris and later under Johann Baptist Stiglmaier at Munich. Wolff set up a foundry at Berlin in 1838 and produced designs and sculptures in iron and bronze. He specialized in casts of animals for which he drew acclaim. Wolff exhibited in the Prussian Academy of Arts from 1839 and was made member of the Academy in 1865.

His castings are mostly in Germany but one exhibit "The Dying Lioness" at Berlin, has a second casting at Philadelphia.

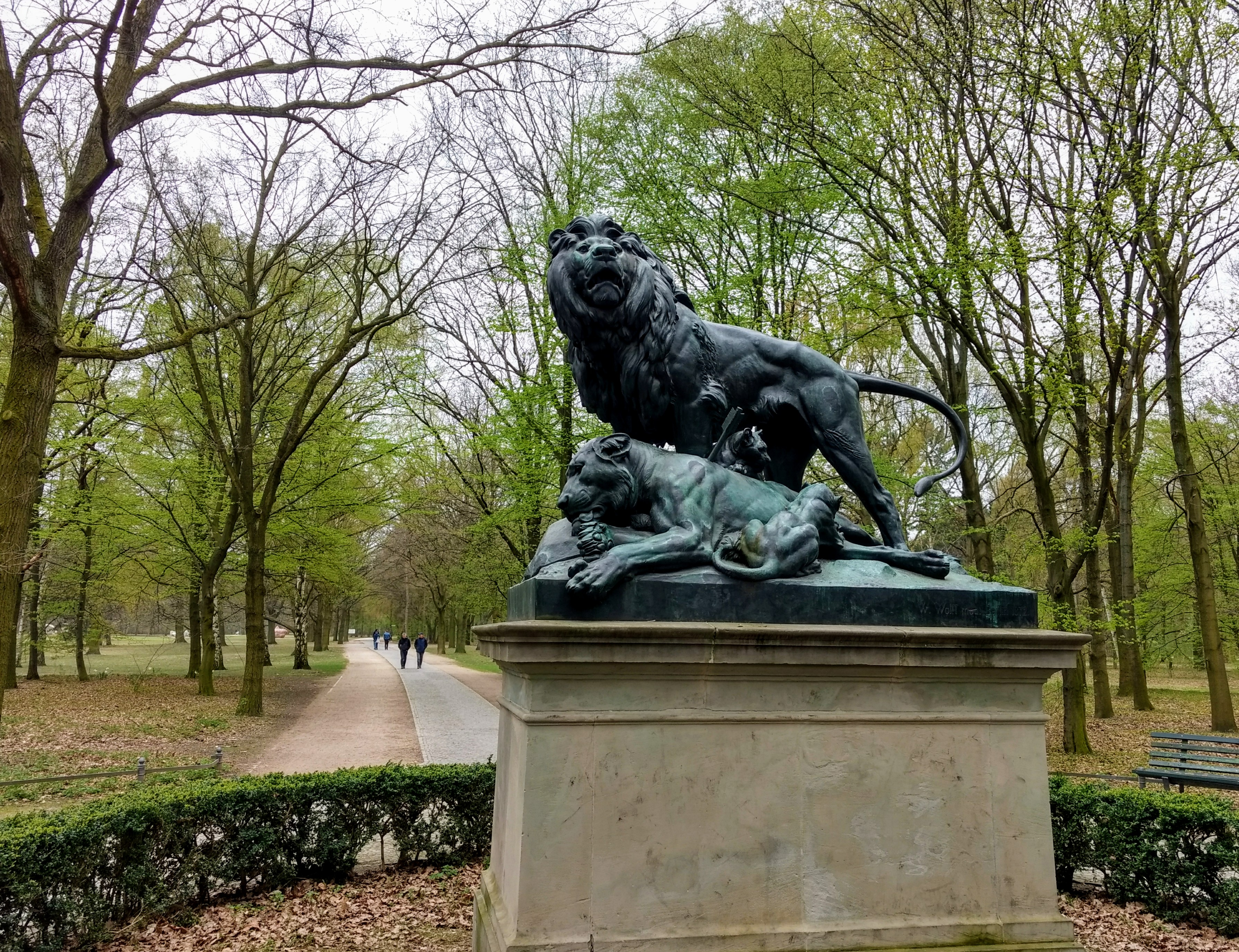
The Dying Lioness - in Berlin

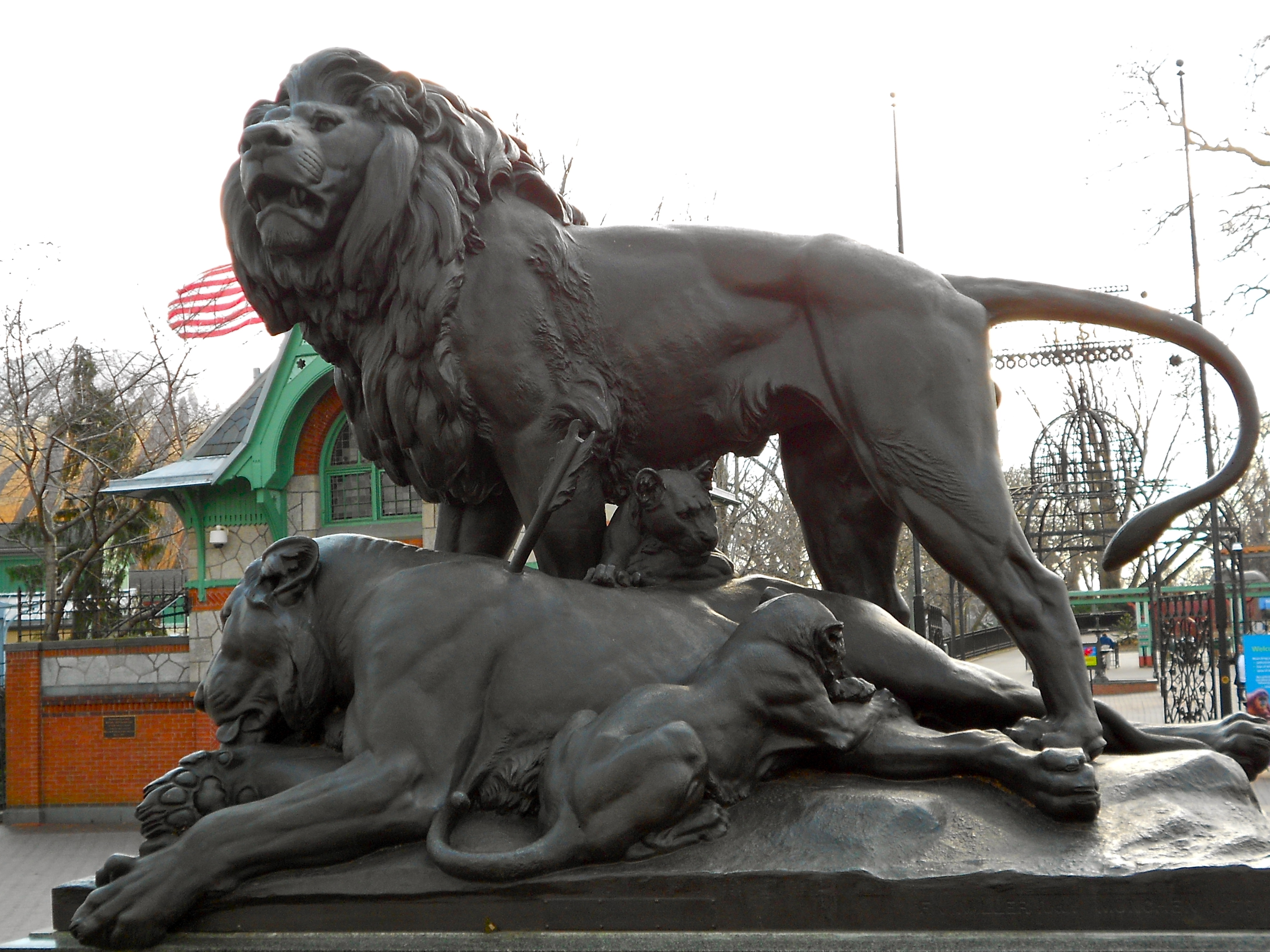
in Philadelphia

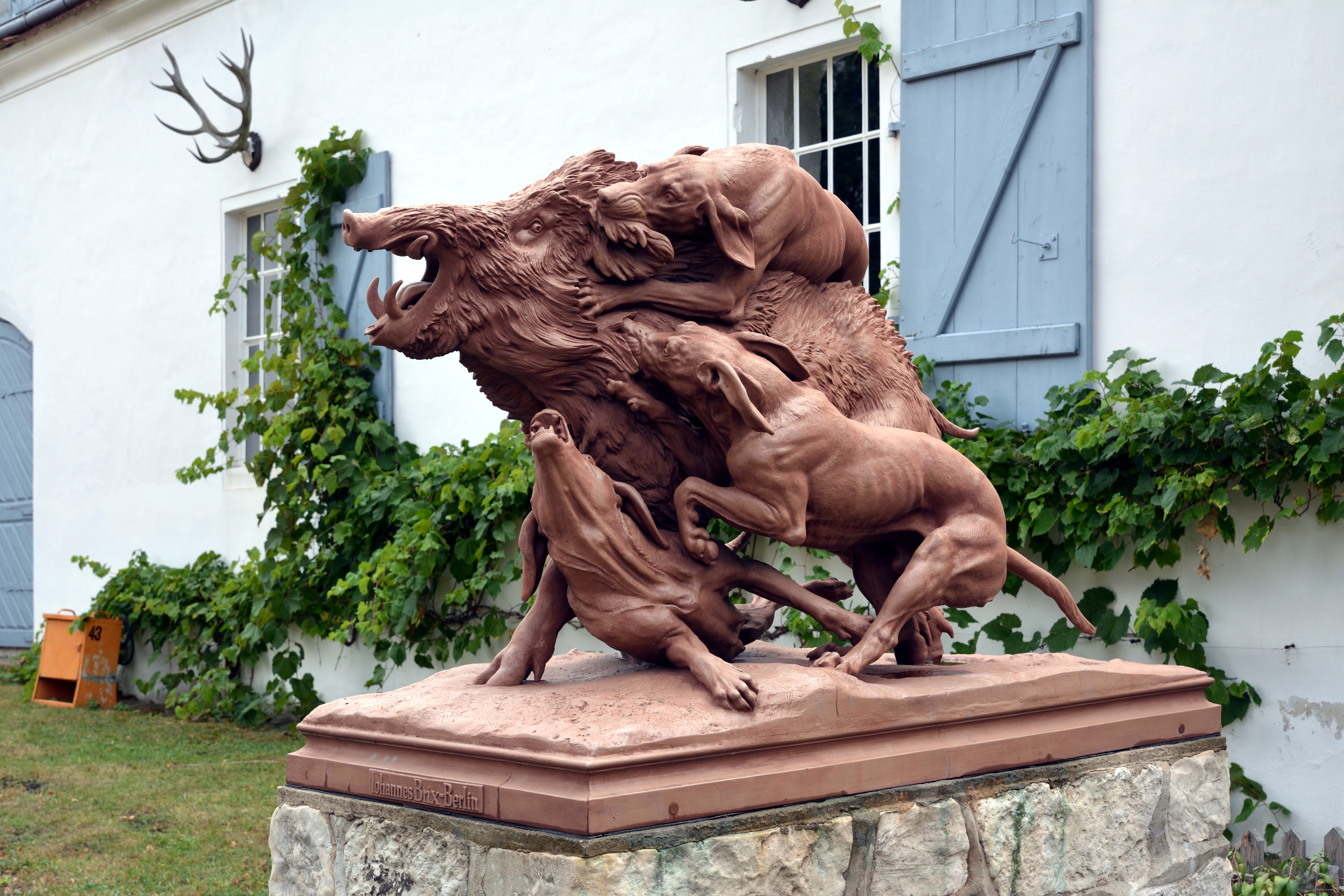
„Wildschweinjagd“ in Jagdschloss Grunewald

He died May 30 1887.
