= Sebastian Wolf (footballer, born 1993) =

German footballer

Personal information
- Full name: Sebastian Wolf
- Date of birth: 1 March 1993 (age 33)
- Place of birth: Munich, Germany
- Height: 1.96 m (6 ft 5 in)
- Position: Goalkeeper

Youth career
- SC Olching
- Bayern Munich
- –2011: 1860 Munich
- 2011–2012: SpVgg Unterhaching

Senior career*
Years	Team	Apps	(Gls)
2011–2014	SpVgg Unterhaching	1	(0)
2011–2014	SpVgg Unterhaching II	28	(0)
2015–2017	SpVgg Unterhaching	0	(0)
- * Club domestic league appearances and goals as of 22:45, 26 September 2017 (UTC)

Sebastian Wolf (born 1 March 1993) is a German footballer who plays as a goalkeeper.
