= Friedrich Wolf =

Friedrich Wolf may refer to:

- Friedrich Wolf (writer) (1888–1953), German doctor and writer
- Friedrich August Wolf (1759–1824), German philologist and critic
- Friedrich Wolf (gymnast) (1880–?), German gymnast

== See also ==
- Fred Wolf (disambiguation)
