= Robert Wolfe (disambiguation) =

Robert Wolfe (1921–2014) was a senior archivist of the US National Archives and expert on captured German war documents.

Robert Wolfe may also refer to:

- Bob Wolfe (clergyman) (fl. 1970s–2020s), American clergyman
- Bob Wolfe (American football) (born 1946), head football coach
- Robert M. Wolfe (died 1940), last mayor of South Norwalk, Connecticut (1909–1910 and 1912–1913)
- Robert Hewitt Wolfe (born 1964), American television producer and scriptwriter
- Robert F. Wolfe (died 1927), newspaper founder
- Robert L. Wolfe (1928–1981), American film editor

== See also ==
- Robert Wolff (disambiguation)
- Robert Wolf (disambiguation)
