= Walter Wolf (disambiguation) =

Walter Wolf is a Canadian oil-drilling equipment supplier.

Walter Wolf is also the name of:

- Lefty Wolf (1900–1971), American baseball player
- Walter Wolf (cartoon character), an Animaniacs character
- Walter Wolf (politician) (1907–1977), German politician
- Walter Wolf Racing, a Formula One constructor
- Walter Wolf (cigarette), a Croatian brand of cigarettes
- Wally Wolf (baseball), American baseball pitcher
