= Franz Wolf =

Franz Wolf may refer to:

- Franz Wolf (SS officer) (1907–1999), German Nazi senior squad leader
- Franz Wolf (canoeist) (born 1938), Austrian sprint canoer
- Franz Wolf (bishop) (1876-1944), Catholic bishop
