= Josh Wolf =

Josh Wolf or Josh Wolfe may refer to:

- Josh Wolf (baseball)
- Josh Wolf (comedian) (born 1969), American stand-up comedian, actor, and writer
- Josh Wolf (journalist) (born 1982), American journalist and documentary filmmaker, video blogger
- Josh Wolfe, American entrepreneur, founder of Lux Capital
- Joshua Wolfe, photographer who won the 2009 Ansel Adams Award for Conservation Photography

== See also ==
- Josh Wolff (born 1977), American soccer player
