= Gary Wolf =

Gary Wolf may refer to:

- Gary K. Wolf (born 1941), American author and humorist
- Gary Wolf (journalist), writer and contributing editor at Wired magazine
- Gary K. Wolfe (born 1946), American editor and critic

== See also ==
- Gary Wolfe (disambiguation)
