= Woolf (given name) =

Woolf is a masculine given name which may refer to:

- Woolf Barnato (1895–1948), British financier and racing driver
- Woolf Fisher (1912–1975), New Zealand businessman and philanthropist
- Woolf Steinberg (1925–1996), birth name of English actor Woolf Morris
- Woolf Wess (1861–1946), Anglo-Jewish anarchist, trade union organizer and newspaper editor

== See also ==
- Wolf (name)
