= John Elgin Woolf =

American architect (1908–1980)

John Elgin Woolf (1908 in Atlanta – 1980 in Beverly Hills, California), was an American architect noted for the Hollywood homes he created with partner and adopted son Robert Koch Woolf.

== Career ==
After receiving his bachelor's degree in architecture from Georgia Institute of Technology in 1929, Mr. Woolf (known as Jack) moved to Hollywood, hoping to pursue a career in film. Hoping his Southern background might prove an asset in filming Gone with the Wind, he met the film's first director, George Cukor, who was instrumental in helping Woolf meet other influential people in Hollywood who later became his clients.

In the late 1940s, Woolf met Robert Koch, an interior designer. They became partners and together built or renovated homes for many of the wealthy and famous Los Angeles area residents of the 1950s and 1960s.

They "established a new vocabulary for glamorous movie-star living; they synthesized 19th-century French, Greek Revival and Modernist touches into a heady mixture that has since been christened Hollywood Regency, which foreshadowed aspects of postmodernism."

One of their most notable renovations was Case Study House No. 17, the largest and most technology-enhanced of the Case Study Houses sponsored by Arts & Architecture magazine, designed by Craig Ellwood and originally built in 1955. Woolf and Koch purchased the house in 1962 and transformed it from its original utilitarian design to their own more glamorous architectural style, which they used for their own residence.

== Legacy ==
Woolf designed homes for clients Cary Grant, Errol Flynn, Judy Garland, Barbara Stanwyck, Ira Gershwin, Fanny Brice, Bob Hope, Agnes Moorehead, Ronald Colman, Jean Howard, Lillian Gish, Mervyn LeRoy, Paul Lynde, Ray Milland, Ricardo Montalbán, Loretta Young, Katharine Hepburn and Spencer Tracy. Bob and Dolores Hope hired John Elgin Woolf in the 1950s to remodel and update their 1939 Robert Finkelhor-designed house in Toluca Lake.

Additionally, many Hollywood builders of the same era imitated the style created by Woolf, which typically featured his "Pullman doors" front entry, leaded oval glass window, mansard roofline and Doric columns.

== Family ==
Robert Koch Woolf was Jack's partner and lover. In 1971, after being diagnosed with Parkinson's Disease, Woolf adopted Koch and Gene Oney Woolf, who had come to reside with them, in order to legalize their relationship and formally establish a family. A later household member, William Capp, was included as a "brother," although never formally adopted. This became known to friends as the "Woolf Pack" and is still present in Hollywood vernacular.

== Significant projects ==
- Cary Grant, 9966 Beverly Grove Drive, Los Angeles
- Errol Flynn, 7740 Mulholland Drive, Los Angeles
- Vincente Minnelli and Judy Garland, 8850 Evanview Drive, Los Angeles
- Barbara Stanwyck, 273 South Glen Boulevard, Los Angeles
- Ira and Leonore Gershwin, 1021 North Roxbury Drive, Beverly Hills
- Fanny Brice, 312 North Faring Road, Los Angeles
- Bob Hope, 10346 Moorpark Street, North Hollywood
- Agnes Moorehead, 1023 North Roxbury Drive, Beverly Hills
- Ronald Colman, 1003 Summit Drive, Beverly Hills
- Charles K. Feldman and Jean Howard, 2000 Coldwater Canyon, Los Angeles
- Lillian Gish, Trancas Beach, Malibu
- Mervyn LeRoy, 332 St. Cloud Road, Bel Air
- Paul Lynde, 103 Robin Drive, Los Angeles
- Ray Milland, 10664 Bellagio Road, Los Angeles
- Ricardo and Georgiana Montalbán, 9256 Robin Drive, Los Angeles
- Loretta Young, 8313 Fountain Avenue, Los Angeles
- Katharine Hepburn and Spencer Tracy, 9191 St. Ives Drive, Beverly Hills
