= Fred Wolf =

Fred or Frederick Wolf may refer to:

- Fred Wolf (animator) (born 1932), American animator
- Fred Wolf (writer) (born 1964), American film director and writer
- Fred Alan Wolf (born 1934), American theoretical physicist
- Frederick Wolf (1922–1999), Episcopal bishop of Maine
- Frederick William Wolf Jr. (1879–1954), American inventor and engineer known for creating the world's first electric refrigerator
- Frederick Adolph Wolf, American plant pathologist and mycologist

== See also ==
- Friedrich Wolf (disambiguation)
