= Henry Wolf (disambiguation) =

Henry Wolf (1925–2005) was an Austrian-born, American graphic designer, photographer and art director.

Henry Wolf, or similar, may also refer to:

- Henry Wolf (engraver) (1852–1916), a French-born wood engraver
- Henry C. Wolf (fl. 1960s), namesake of the Henry C. Wolf Law Library
- Henry Wolfe (born 1979), an American songwriter, singer, and actor
- Henry Woolf (born 1930), a British-born actor, theatre director and teacher

== See also ==
- Harry Wolf (disambiguation)
- Heinrich Wolf (1875–1943), an Austrian chess master
- Heinrich Wolf (entomologist) (born 1924, Siegen), a German entomologist
- Henry Wolff (disambiguation)
- Henry Wulff (disambiguation)
