= Patrick Wolf (disambiguation) =

Patrick Wolf (born 1983) is an English musician.

Patrick Wolf may also refer to:

- Patrick Wolf (Austrian footballer) (born 1981)
- Patrick Wolf (German footballer) (born 1989)

== See also ==
- Patrick Wolfe, Canadian candidate, see Results of the Canadian federal election, 2004
- Patrick Wolff (born 1968), chess player
- Patrick Wolfe (born 1949), Australian historian
- Patrick Woulfe (fl. 1940s–1950s), Irish independent politician and solicitor
