= Paul Aebersold =

American nuclear physicist

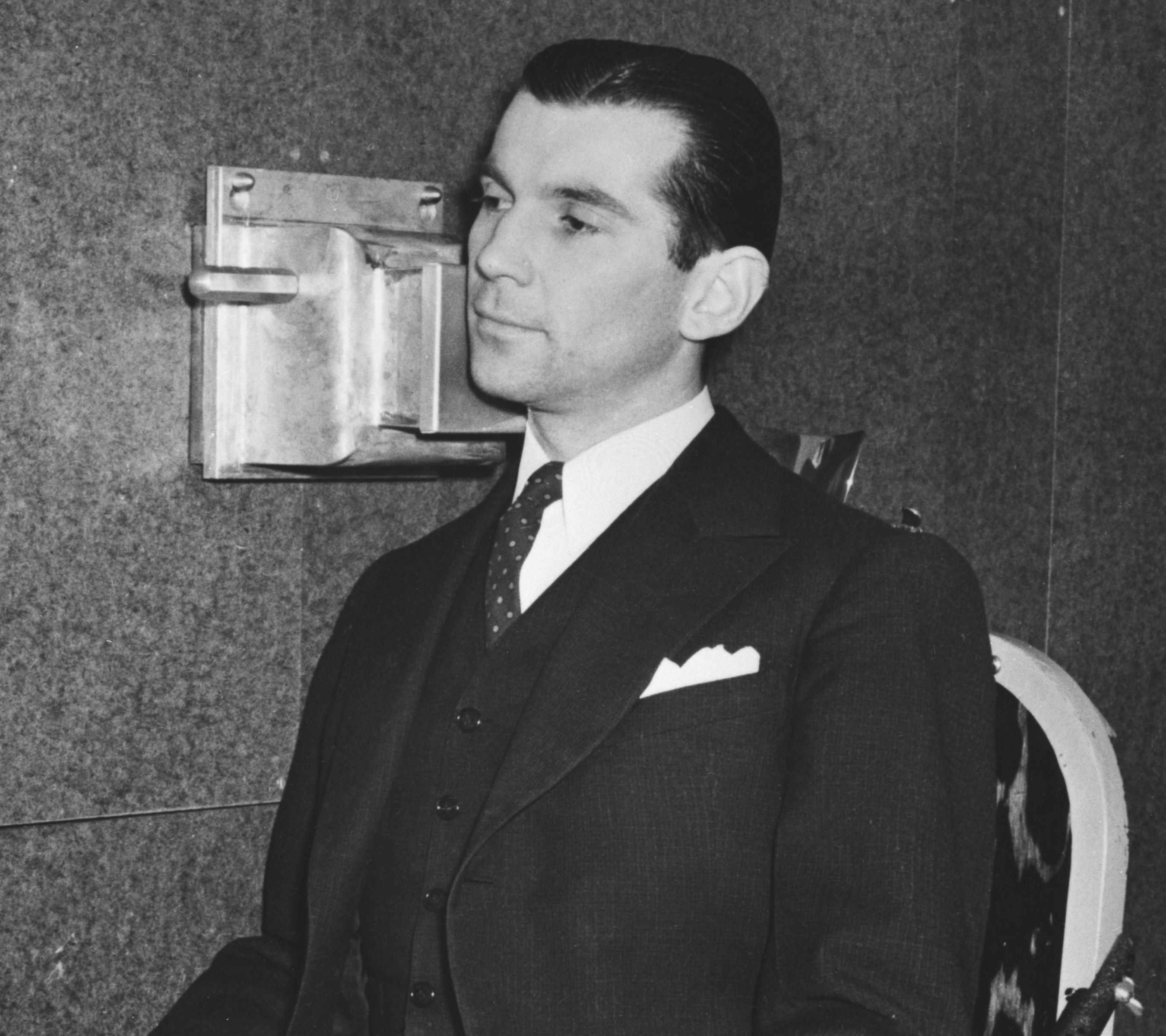
Aebersold in 1939

Paul C. Aebersold (July 7, 1910 - May 29, 1967) was an American nuclear physicist and pioneer of the biologic and medical application of radioactive materials. He worked on the Manhattan Project and became the first director of the United States Atomic Energy Commission's Division of Isotope Development.

== Education ==
Aebersold was born in Fresno, California on July 7, 1910 to Paul and Dora Houck Aebersold. He read science and science fiction magazines during his youth and built a crystal radio at the age of 12. He graduated from Oakland High School and attended Pasadena Junior College. He earned a bachelor's degree in physics from Stanford University in 1932, a master's degree from the University of California, Berkeley in 1934, and his PhD in physics at the University of California, Berkeley in 1939.

== Career ==
After receiving his Ph.D. degree, he remained at California, Berkeley's Radiation Laboratory as a research associate. In 1940, he was placed in charge of the 60-inch cyclotron, which produced the first man-made plutonium. In 1942, he became a became a special administrative aid to Professor Ernest Lawrence and assisted him with the laboratory's Uranium-235 program. He helped oversee the growth of the laboratory staff from about 20 to over 1,000 members. He later served as head of laboratory's information division.

In 1944, Aebersold moved to Oak Ridge National Laboratory as a Technical Consultant. The following year, he was sent to Los Alamos, where he took measurements and conducted radiation-related research prior to and after the Trinity nuclear weapons test. After World War II, Aebersold returned to Oak Ridge where he rose to the position of Director of the Division of Isotopes Development.

In 1957, he was appointed to the newly created position of assistant director for isotopes and radiation in the United States Atomic Energy Commission's division of civilian application. The following year, he was promoted to director for isotopes and radiation. In 1961, he became director of the Division of Isotopes Development.

== Later life and death ==
In the 1960s, Aebersold received treatment for depression. He went on medical leave in June 1964. On February 4, 1965, he attempted suicide by jumping off the Key Bridge, but was rescued by four soldiers. He retired from the AEC later that year and took a part-time teaching position at Montgomery Junior College. On May 29, 1967, he jumped from the top floor of a 17-story apartment building near his home in Chevy Chase, Maryland. His death was ruled a suicide.

== Legacy ==
An award issued by the Society of Nuclear Medicine and Molecular Imaging was named in his memory. It was first presented in 1973 for "Outstanding Achievement in Basic Nuclear Medicine Science".
