= Ann Wolf =

Ann Wolf (or similar) may refer to:

- Anne Wolf (born 1967), Belgian pianist
- Ann Wolfe (born 1971), American boxer
- Ann Wolff (born 1937), a German glass artist
