= Wolf Mendlin =

- Born: 10 June 1842; Mogilev, Mogilev Governorate, Russian Empire
- Died: 10 August 1912 (aged 70)
- Occupation: Economist
- Writing career
- Language: Hebrew
- Literary movement: Haskalah

Zev Wolf ben Jacob Mendlin (Yiddish: זאב װאָלף בן יעקב מענדלין; 10 June 1842 – 10 August 1912) was a Russian economist. He is considered the first to write in Hebrew about the economic situation of Jews in the Russian Empire.

== Biography ==
Wolf Mendlin was born into a Jewish family in Mogilev in 1842. In about 1862 he went to Germany, where he studied the labour movement under Ferdinand Lassalle. This experience roused his ambition to delve more deeply into the study of economics and co-operation.

In 1879, Mendlin made his first appearance as a writer, contributing an article on the economic circumstances of Russian Jews to Ha-Melitz. Subsequently, he continued to provide insights on related topics in such publications as Ha-Tzefirah, Ha-Melitz, Ruskii Yevrei, Voskhod, and Ulei. Mendlin's also wrote Ba-meh nivasheʻa (St. Petersburg, 1883), a collection of four essays on the improvement of the economic condition of Russian Jews; Meḳore ha-ʻosher (Odessa, 1898), a politico-economic study; and Di kvalen zikh zelbst tsu helfen (in Yiddish; Odessa, 1894). Across these writings, Mendlin advocated for mutual aid and co-operative organizations as the most effective means of improving the dire conditions of the Jewish masses in Russia.

Mendlin played also a central role in founding charitable institutions within the Jewish community of Odessa.

== Selected publications ==
- Ba-meh nivasheʻa (in Hebrew). St. Petersburg: Zederbaum. 1883.
- Mekore ha-ʻosher (in Hebrew). Odessa: Belinson. 1898.
- Di kvalen zikh zelbst tsu helfen (in Yiddish). Odessa: Dukhno. 1894.
