= Steven Wolf (disambiguation) =

Steven (or Stephen) Wolf (or Wolfe, Woolfe, Wolff) may refer to:

- Stephen Wolf (born 1941), American businessman
- Steven Wolf (active since 1989), American musician and music producer
- Steven Woolfe (born 1967), British politician
- Steven J. Wolfe (born 1959), film producer
- Stephen Wolff, computer scientist
- Johnny Sins (born 1978), American pornographic actor
- Steven Matthew Wolf (convicted Jan. 24, 2023) American Serial Killer
