= Charlie Wolfe =

Australian rules footballer (1892–1966)

Personal information
- Full name: Charles Bradley Floyd Wolfe
- Born: 26 April 1892; Queenstown, Tasmania
- Died: 8 November 1966 (aged 74); Heidelberg, Victoria
- Original team: Devonport

Playing career^{1}
Years	Club	Games (Goals)
1909–11	Mechanics (LDFA)	
1912	Devonport (NWFU)	
1913	South Melbourne	6 (2)
1914–15	Subiaco (WAFL)	
- ^{1} Playing statistics correct to the end of 1915.

Career highlights
- 1915 WAFL Premiership

Charlie Wolfe (26 April 1892 – 8 November 1966) was an Australian rules footballer who played with South Melbourne in the Victorian Football League (VFL).

After one season in Victoria he transferred to Western Australia where he played with Subiaco and was a member of their premiership winning side in 1915.
