= USS Alfred Wolf =

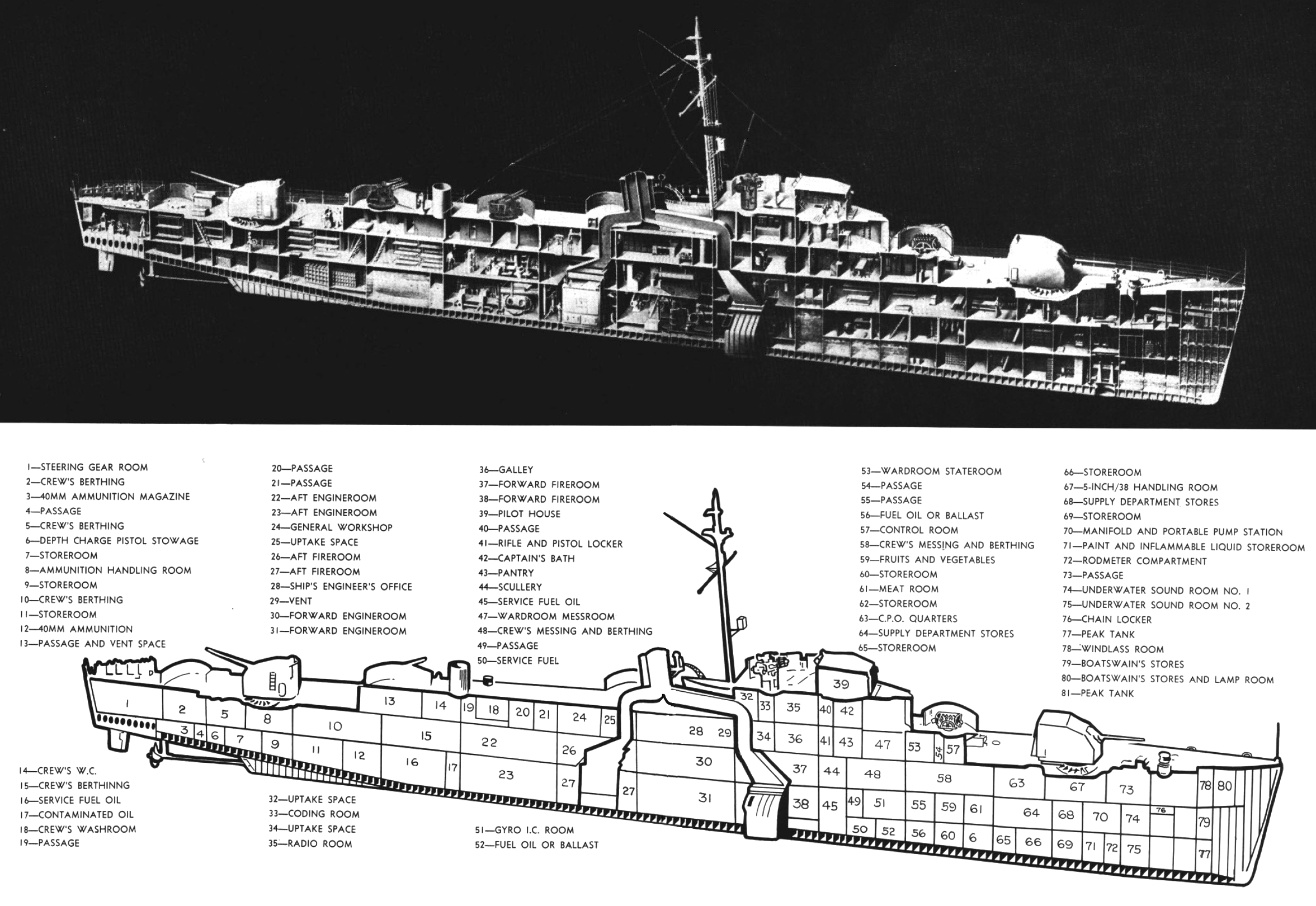
- Diagram showing a US Navy escort destroyer ("DE"). The type shown is a John C. Butler-class destroyer escort, which Alfred Wolf would have been part of.

History

United States
- Name: Alfred Wolf
- Namesake: Seaman First Class Alfred Wolf (1923–1943)
- Builder: Boston Navy Yard, Boston, Massachusetts
- Laid down: 9 December 1943
- Fate: Construction contract cancelled 5 September 1944; Scrapped on slip
- Notes: Construction suspended 10 June 1944

General characteristics (as planned)
- Class & type: John C. Butler-class destroyer escort
- Displacement: 1,350 long tons (1,370 t) (light); 1,745 long tons (1,773 t) (full load)
- Length: 306 ft (93 m) oa; 300 ft (91 m) w/l
- Beam: 36 ft 10 in (11.23 m)
- Draft: 11 ft (3.4 m)
- Installed power: 2 × "D" Express boilers; 12,000 shaft horsepower (8,900 kW)
- Propulsion: 2 × geared turbine engines; 2 × propellers
- Speed: 24 kn (44 km/h; 28 mph)
- Range: 6,000 nmi (11,000 km; 6,900 mi) at 12 kn (22 km/h; 14 mph)
- Complement: 14 officers, 201 enlisted
- Armament: 2 × single 5 in (127 mm) guns; 2 × twin 40 mm (1.6 in) AA guns; 10 × single 20 mm (0.79 in) AA guns; 1 × triple 21 in (533 mm) torpedo tubes; 8 × depth charge throwers; 1 × Hedgehog ASW mortar; 2 × depth charge racks

USS Alfred Wolf (DE-544) was a World War II United States Navy John C. Butler-class destroyer escort whose keel was laid in December 1943, but whose construction at the Boston Navy Yard was cancelled in September 1944 prior to its completion.

== Namesake ==
Alfred Wolf was born on 1 August 1923 in Pforzheim, Germany to Sali Kilsheimer and Regina Wolf. He emigrated to the United States with his mother in 1929. He enlisted in the United States Naval Reserve at New York City on 7 January 1942 and went through United States Marine Corps Recruit Training at Newport, Rhode Island, between 11 January 1942 and 11 February 1942. Following further instruction at the Naval Operating Base, Norfolk at Norfolk, Virginia, he entered the Naval Armed Guard School at Little Creek, Virginia, on 23 March 1942.

After completing training Wolf reported aboard the Liberty ship SS Samuel Chase on 20 April 1942 and was serving in that ship when she departed Iceland for the northern Soviet Union as part of Convoy PQ 17 on 27 June 1942. Luftwaffe aircraft attacked the convoy on 2 July 1943 and continued their raids over the next few days. The convoy's initially heavy supporting force of warships was drawn off; when the German battleship Tirpitz was reported to have sortied from Norway to attack the convoy, the merchant ships and what smaller escorts remained were ordered to scatter, greatly aiding the German attackers. Six near-misses from German bombers on 10 July 1942 caused heavy damage to Samuel Chase, snapping all steam lines, cutting off all auxiliaries, and blowing the compass out of the binnacle. Seaman First Class Wolf and her other gunners fought in what naval historian Samuel Eliot Morison called "the grimmest convoy battle of the entire war." Morison lauded the Naval Armed Guard crews of three particular PQ 17 merchant ships: SS Washington, SS Daniel Morgan, and SS Samuel Chase. "Their clothing was inadequate and their ammunition insufficient," he wrote, "but their fighting spirit never failed." Samuel Chase managed to survive the ordeal of PQ 17, part of a pitiful remnant of the original convoy. For his part in the defense of Samuel Chase during her battle as a part of Convoy PQ 17, Seaman 1st Class Wolf earned a Letter of Commendation which praised his meritorious conduct in action.

Detached from Samuel Chase on 24 October 1942, Wolf reported aboard the United States Army Transport USAT Henry R. Mallory at New York City on 12 November 1942. On 17 November 1942, the transport departed for Reykjavík, Iceland, and stopped at St. John's in the Dominion of Newfoundland and Halifax, Nova Scotia, in Canada before returning via Boston, Massachusetts, to New York City. Henry R. Mallory then once more visited Reykjavík, departing New York City on 24 January 1943. She was en route to New York City on her return voyage in Convoy SC 118 when the German submarine U-402 torpedoed and sank her on the morning of 7 February 1943, Wolf was among those killed.

== Construction ==
The name Alfred Wolf was assigned to the ship on 26 October 1943. Her keel was laid at the Boston Navy Yard in Boston, Massachusetts, on 9 December 1943. Due to changes in World War II ship construction priorities, the construction of Alfred Wolf was suspended on 10 June 1944, and cancelled altogether on 5 September 1944. Subsequently, the incomplete ship was scrapped on the building ways.
