= James Wolf =

James or Jim Wolf, Wolfe or DeWolf may refer to:

- James DeWolf (1764–1837), American politician, privateer, and slave trader
- James Madison DeWolf (1843–1876), U.S. Army surgeon
- James Ratchford DeWolf (1787–1855), merchant and political figure in Nova Scotia
- James Wolfe (1727–1759), British general
- James Wolffe (born 1962), Scottish lawyer
- Jim Wolf (born 1969), Major League Baseball umpire
- Jim Wolf (musician) (fl. 2010s–2020s), American singer
- Jim Wolf (American football) (1952–2003), American football player
- James A. Wolfe (born 1960), former Security Director of the U.S. Senate Select Intelligence Committee (SSCI)
- James H. Wolfe (1884–1958), a chief justice of the Utah Supreme Court

== See also ==
- Jamie DeWolf
