= John Wolf =

John Wolf may refer to:

- John Wolf (diplomat) (born 1948), American diplomat
- John Wolf (gymnast), American Olympic gymnast
- John Baptist Wolf (1907–1996), American historian
- John B. Wolf (pastor) (1925–2017), American Unitarian Universalist pastor in Tulsa, Oklahoma
- John Quincy Wolf (1901–1972), American folklorist and academic

== See also ==
- John Wolfe (disambiguation)
