= Hanns Wolf =

German composer and pianist

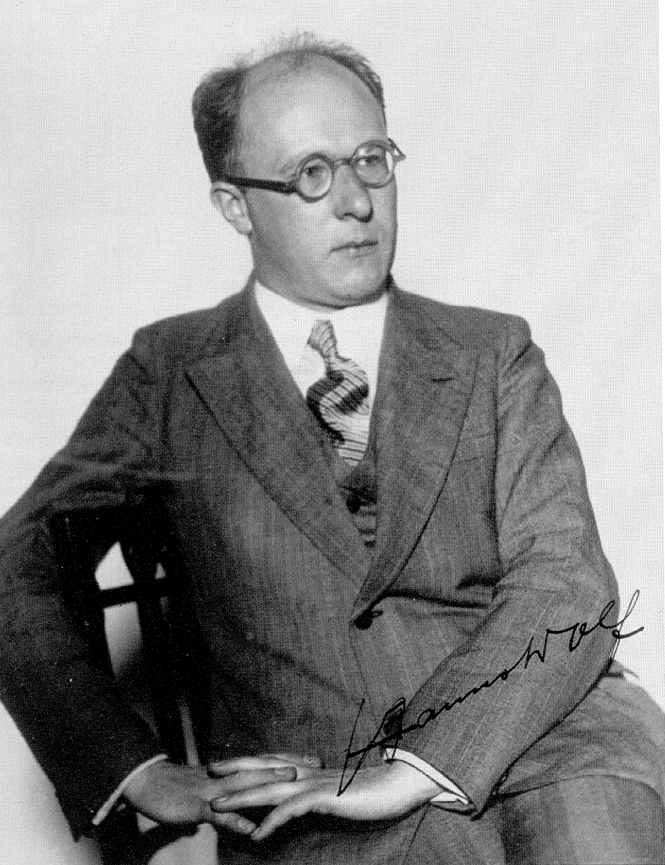
- Hanns Wolf in Coburg
- Born: 7 June 1894; Bamberg, Germany
- Died: 2 July 1968; Füssen, Germany
- Occupations: Composer, pianist
- Era: 20th-century

Hanns Wolf (sometimes incorrectly called Hans Wolf; (Note: However, this should not be confused with Hans Wolf (1912–2005) who was a German conductor who moved to America to escape the Nazis in 1938.) June 7, 1894 – July 2, 1968) was a post-romantic and modern composer, pianist and music professor. Nearly all his works were destroyed after World War II, and Wolf was nearly forgotten until 1996 when he was rediscovered by Karl Urlberger.

== Biography ==
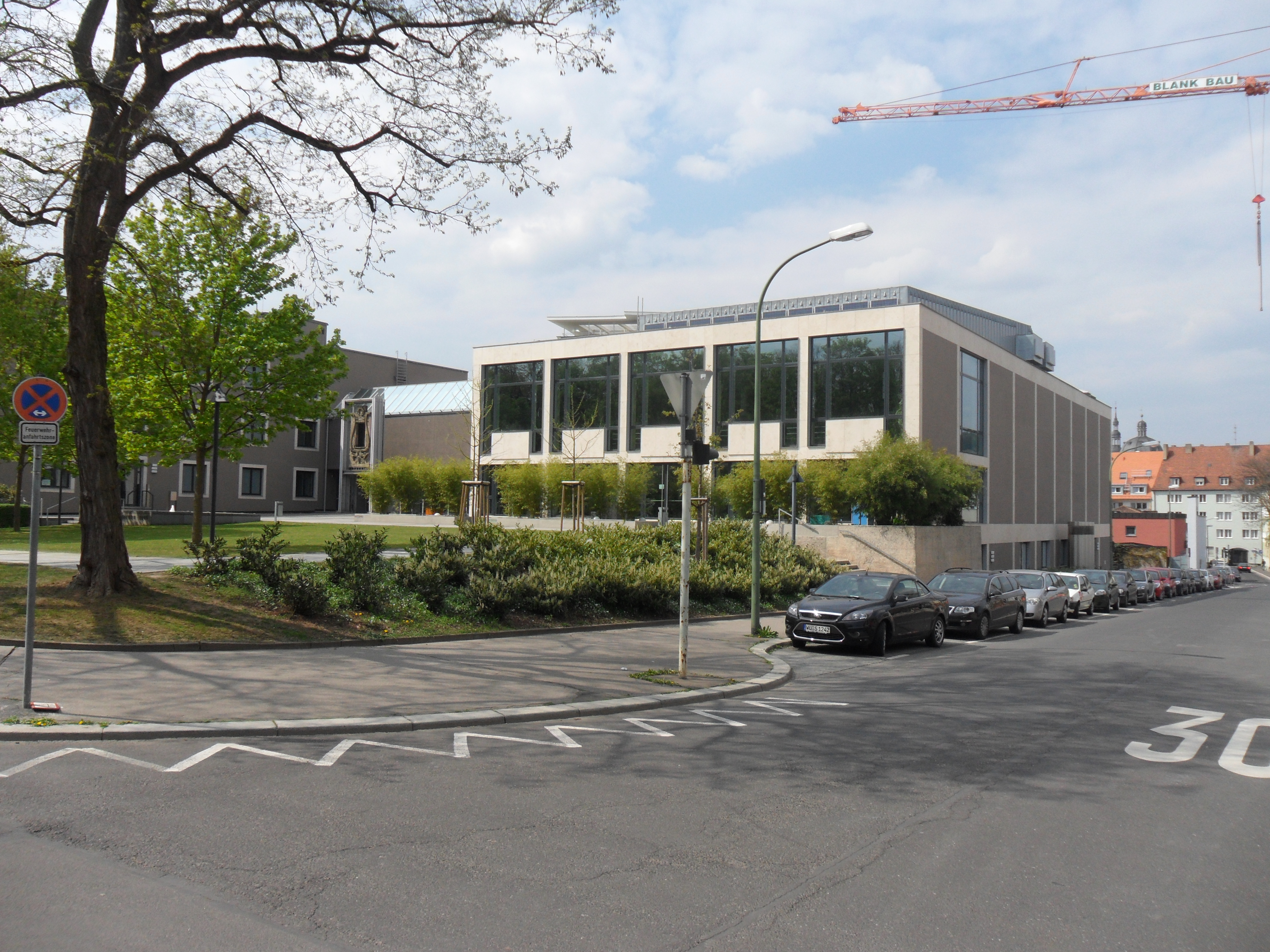
Würzburg Music Conservatory, where Wolf studied between 1908 and 1912

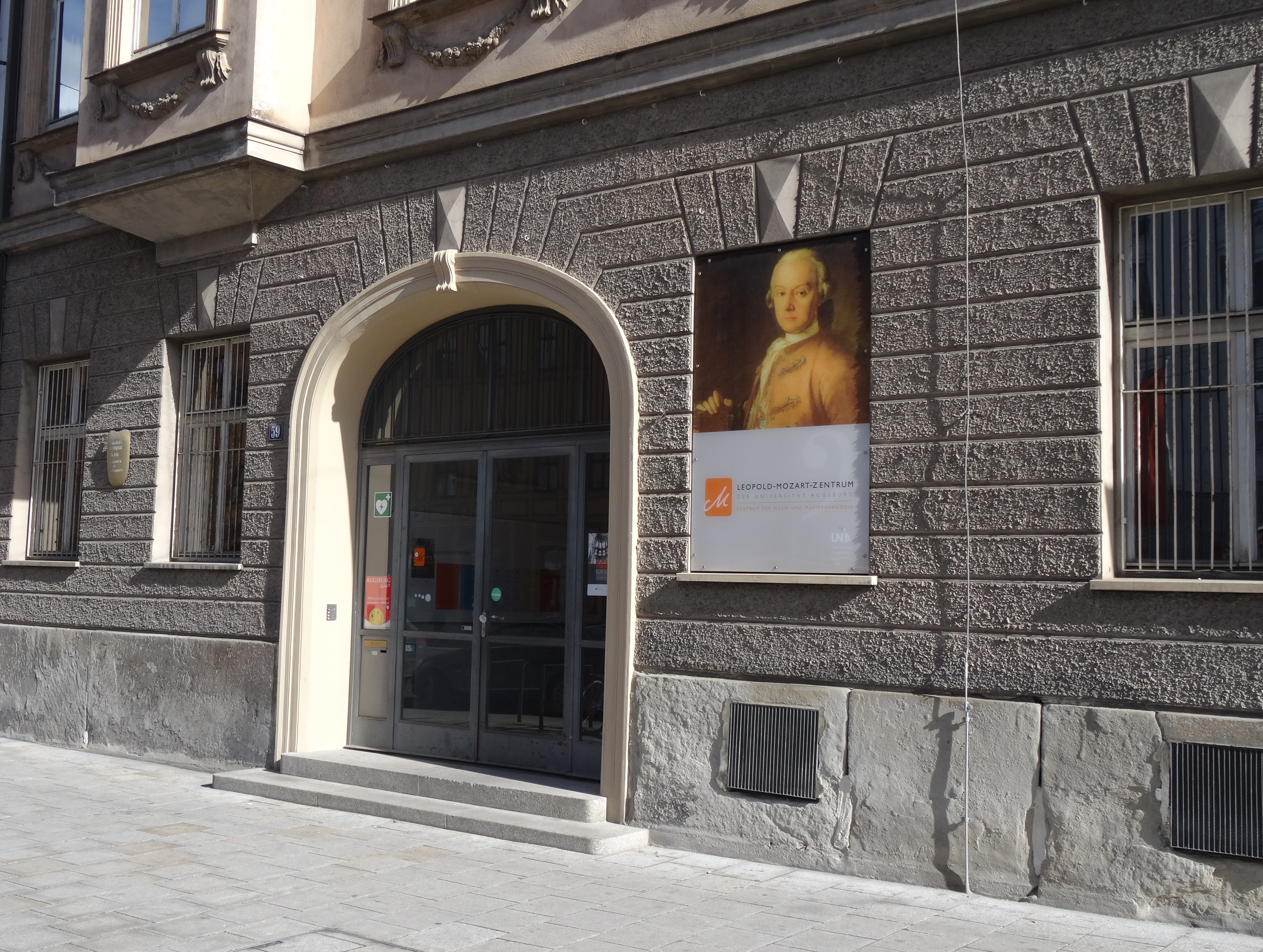
Leopold Mozart Centre in Augsburg, where Wolf taught in 1924

Hanns Wolf was born in Bamberg, Germany. Little is known about his childhood, however from 1908 to 1912, he studied under Max Meyer-Olbersleben for composition and Henryk van Zeyl (who was a student of Liszt) for piano in the Würzburg Music Conservatory.

From 1912 to 1924 he was a teacher for piano and organ, first in Essen as a private piano teacher from the year 1912 to 1913, then in Aschaffenburg as a teacher of piano and organ in the Städtische Musikschule Aschaffenburg (municipal music school), starting as a permanent teacher from February 1914 to 1924. In Aschaffenburg, Wolf was considerably popular and well known as he and Hermann Kundigraber (who was the head of the music school) organized many concerts that can be date backed as early as 1917. (Note: The 1917 event involved many people such as Alois Seifert, Alfred Hoehn, the Stuttgarter Oratorio Quartet, and many more. It lasted for a few weeks; in this time Wolf created several compositions and performed some in the time of October 31 – November 22.) Wolf taught piano to Ottmar Geißler (Geissler).

After 1924, Wolf was a professor in the Augsburg Musikhochschule, now known as Leopold Mozart Centre of the University of Augsburg. As Wolf had a prior job as an organ professor, he had relations to Arthur Piechler (who was an organ virtuoso), Piechler was the student of Heinrich Kaspar Schmid who was the director of the music school. Wolf also played piano around Europe, playing the works of Dobrowen and Wladigeroff. However, the outbreak of World War II forced him to stay in Germany. During this time, he was a celebrated pianist across the country - Furtwängler praised him as a talented pianist both in technique and musicality. He continued to hold his position as a professor in the university until the war ended in 1945, when he resigned as a professor and lived as an independent composer and pianist.

He died at the age of 74 on July 2, 1968, in Füssen, Germany.

== Compositions, works and performances ==
A majority of his work has been destroyed or lost, most likely for political reasons, but it is still uncertain. As a pianist, he performed with Otto Klemperer, Georg Ludwig Jochum, and Eduard van Beinum.

His compositions were mostly piano related.

=== Compositions ===
- Piano Concerto in C-sharp minor (1929)
- Ernst und Scherz (Serious and Joking) 10 piano pieces (1930)
- Leichte Spielmusik (Light music) 10 small piano pieces for youth
- Étude in E minor Springbrunnen
- Paraphrase for the piano on "Wiener Blut" by Johann Strauss II
- 5 Franconian Dances for four hands (~1935) (pub. Anton Böhm & Sohn, Augsburg, 1943)
  - Schottisch
  - Polka
  - Polka
  - Walzer
  - Galopp
- Vier Bauerntänze (Op. 7, 4 Peasant Dances for strings) (pub. Anton Böhm & Sohn, Augsburg, 1937)
- Piano arrangement of a minuet by Leopold Mozart (1937)
- Piano arrangement of 3 German Dances by Wolfang Amadeus Mozart (K. 605; 1971) (pub. Anton Böhm & Sohn, Augsburg, 1933)
- Prof. Mannheim (1934)
- Twelve variations on a minuet by Johann Christian Fischer KV 179, (A rewrite of the original variations by Mozart, this work was originally started by Alfred Hoffmiller of the Augsburg music school; 1940s?)

== Rediscovery and recordings ==
In 1996, Karl Urlberger reintroduced Hanns Wolf to the world, recording five of Wolf's pieces (listed below) in 1997 under the •K•U• Classics (Note: •K•U• Classics is a label owned by Karl Urlberger, KU are his initials. These recordings were on KU 29002, but the piano concerto was released again with Franz Liszt's Piano Concerto no. 2 and Totentanz as KU 29004.) (Aschaffenburg) label. While the 4 Peasant Dances were also released on "For strings only" CD that includes Moritz Moszkowski's Prelude and Fugue Op. 85, Alec Rowley's English Dance Suite, Richard Trunk's Serenade for strings Op. 55, George Enescu's two intermezzi for strings, Op. 12, and Constantin Silvestri 3 pieces for string orchestra, Op. 4, No. 2. All the recordings were made in Romania.

Piece	Instrumentation	Performer(s)	Additional information
Piano Concerto in C-sharp minor	Piano and orchestra	Dana Borsan (pianist), National Radio Orchestra of Romania conducted by Ludovic Bács	Composed in 1929
4 Peasant Dances for strings	Strings	National Radio Orchestra of Romania conducted by Ludovic Bács	
Étude in E minor Springbrunnen	Piano	Dana Borsan	
Piano rearrangement of a Minuet by Leopold Mozart	Piano	Dana Borsan	In D major
Paraphrase for the piano on "Wiener Blut"	Piano	Dana Borsan	

=== Piano concerto ===
The piano concerto was probably composed in 1929; it is known to be performed as early as 1935 in Coburg by the Coburg Gesellschaft der Musikfreunde. Another performance was given on 21 July 1938, in a music program including Hector Berlioz's Roman Carnival overture, and Tchaikovsky's 6th Symphony, in this performance Hanns Wolf was the pianist. In 1939, under the baton of Otto Miehler (1903–1968) in the Flensburg Grenzlandtheater the piano concerto was performed again with Wolf as the pianist; the work was celebrated and was very successful in this performance. That same year, Wolf's 5 Franconian Dances for Four hands was published by Anton Böhm & Sohn. Due to World War II, the piece was not performed again until 60 years later on 17 January 1997, when it was performed and recorded with pianist Dana Borsan and the National Radio Orchestra of Romania conducted by Ludovic Bács. Karl Urlberger organized and helped the performance by bringing the sheet music.

On 8 September 2011, in the 2011 George Enescu Festival, Dana Borsan again performed the piano concerto, but with the "Moldova" Philharmonic Orchestra conducted by Sébastian Rouland. This performance was recorded, and was published on YouTube on 25 April 2013, thus making Wolf more well-known.

=== Other ===
In Box 16 (1927) of the Ernst Henschel collection, there might be a recording of Hanns Wolf's piano recital dated 1 October 1927.

Wolf was recognized in Peter Hollfelder's Lexikon Klaviermusik in 2005.

Wolf's piano concerto was mentioned in Paul D. Escudero's Pluto II: Voyage to the End of the Universe when Greg listened to it to achieve a "Hemi-Sync Reality" during meditation.
