= Wolfe Laboratories =

Wolfe Laboratories, Inc.
- Company type: Private
- Industry: Pharmaceutical/Biotechnology
- Founded: 1999
- Headquarters: Woburn, Massachusetts
- Key people: Dr. Janet Wolfe, Founder and Chief Executive Officer
- Number of employees: 30

Wolfe Laboratories, Inc. (WLI) was a contract research organization (CRO) headquartered in Woburn, Massachusetts. It provided research and development services as well as GLP analytical services for products in late discovery phase through early clinical phases of drug development. It served clients in New England, the US and internationally. Laboratory operations took place in a large 21,000-square-foot (2,000 m^{2}) facility.

Wolfe Laboratories, LLC was acquired by Pace Analytical in 2017, and is now recognized as Pace Analytical Life Sciences, LLC.

== Background ==
The company was founded by Dr. Janet Wolfe in 1999. Prior to starting WLI, Dr. Wolfe was on the faculty of the University of Tennessee in Memphis, where she was a professor in the Pharmaceutical Chemistry department. Dr. Wolfe perceived an unmet need in the growing pharmaceutical and biotechnology industries for analytical method development and formulation services. She founded the company in the Boston area, known for its biotechnology and pharmaceutical industries.

The company is part of a growing outsourcing trend that is affecting the drug development industry, particularly in the Boston area. WLI performs pre-formulation and formulation work, consulting, pharmacokinetics support, in-vitro ADME screens, analytical characterization of API, stability testing and other contract research. It contracts with various companies ranging from early biotechnology startups to established pharmaceutical companies. WLI also offers GLP-compliant services.

WLI was selected as one of the "Top 100 Woman-Led Business in Massachusetts" in 2006. Conducted by the Commonwealth Institute and Center for Woman's Leadership at Babson College, the top 100 businesses were identified based on company revenue.

== Role ==
WLI works in the development of drugs between discovery research and clinical trials. This stage of the drug development process was highlighted by the Food and Drug Administration (FDA) as the initial part of the "critical path". WLI is unusual among the independent CRO's in that it houses both the formulation (pharmaceutical formulations) development and the in-vitro ADME/PK laboratories.

As late as the 1990s, inadequate appreciation for the translational phase of development led to investment in drug candidates with poor or unsuitable physicochemical and ADME properties. In clinical trials, 30 – 40% of drug candidates failed because of unacceptable "drug-like" properties. The company helps clients investigate physicochemical properties that are frequently responsible for the failure of drug candidates, along with poor aqueous solubility and poor aqueous stability. WLI also identifies and addresses various issues affecting the safety of a drug for human consumption, such as ADME characteristics like inadequate bioavailability, interference (activation or inhibition) with the Cytochrome P450 complex and unsuitable clearance profiles.

== Solubility ==
Most drug delivery relies on compatibility with the aqueous environment of the body. WLI specializes in rescuing and optimizing difficult drug candidates so that the product may be suitable for animal and human delivery. WLI specializes in complex cases where excipients must be used to make compounds soluble, a necessary step for clients to advance their products to in vivo trials.
