= Robert Koch Woolf =

American interior decorator

Robert Koch Woolf, formerly known as Robert Koch (1923, in Temple, Texas – 2004, in Montecito, California), was an American interior decorator, noted for the Hollywood homes he created with architect John Elgin Woolf.

== Career ==
After serving in the military during Second World War, Woolf settled in the Los Angeles area where he worked at a local decorating store. He met John Woolf in 1948 and together their homes created a distinctive style using Mansard roofs, Doric columns, oval leaded windows and shutter-framed French doors. Inside, the space was typically as glamorous as it was a play on illusion with circular hallways and mirrored pool pavilions.

They "established a new vocabulary for glamorous movie-star living; they synthesized 19th-century French, Greek Revival and Modernist touches into a heady mixture that has since been christened Hollywood Regency, which foreshadowed aspects of postmodernism."

== Legacy ==
Their clients included many of the leading entertainment personalities of the day including George Cukor, Katharine Hepburn, Ira Gershwin, Judy Garland, Bob Hope, Fanny Brice, Cary Grant, Lillian Gish, Ray Milland and Loretta Young.

== Family ==
Woolf was the lover, business partner and later adopted son of John Woolf. He was survived by his companions Gene Oney (also adopted by John Woolf and now known as Gene Woolf) and William Capp. Shortly after his death in 2004, the lives of all four men were featured in a major article for Vanity Fair.
