= Katie Wolf =

American politician (1925–2020)

Member of the Indiana Senate
- In office 1988–2000

Member of the Indiana House of Representatives
- In office 1986–1988

Personal details
- Born: Kathleen Louise Munsterman; July 9, 1925 Wolcott, Indiana, U.S.
- Died: May 26, 2020 (aged 94) Monticello, Indiana, U.S.
- Party: Democratic
- Spouse: Charlie Wolf (m. 1945; died 2010)
- Children: 2
- Education: Indiana Business College; Purdue University

Kathleen Louise Wolf (née Munsterman; July 9, 1925 – May 26, 2020) was an American politician.

== Personal life ==
Wolf was born to parents John and Helen Munsterman on July 9, 1925, in Wolcott, Indiana, and raised on the family farm. Her father was a Republican precinct committee member. She graduated from Wolcott High School in 1943 and earned a degree from Indiana Business College and also enrolled at Purdue University. She married Charlie Wolf in 1945. The couple lived in Reynolds, then moved to Monticello in 1978. Charlie Wolf died in 2010. Katie Wolf died on May 26, 2020, at the White Oak Health Campus in Monticello.

== Political career ==
Wolf was elected a member of the Democratic National Committee in 1962. In December 1967, she was appointed White County clerk, a position she subsequently held for two full terms in her own right. Wolf served one term as a member of the Indiana House of Representatives from 1984 to 1986, then was elected to consecutive terms in the Indiana Senate until her retirement in 2000.
