= Woolf (surname) =

Woolf is a name that is used as a surname, given name, and a name among Germanic-speaking peoples: see Wolf, Wulf. This name is particularly popular in England especially in the south due to strong Saxon influence: see Anglo-Saxon settlement of Britain. A historian on Anglo Saxon Britain Barbara Yorke commented that the name Woolf originated from Oswelf the 'Wolf', a famous Saxon lord who in legend fought King Horsa. He supposedly changed his name to 'Woolf' from the more Germanic spelling of Wolf. This is the first recording of the name Woolf, although according to Yorke it is most likely that other Saxon families changed their name to this translation.

Notable people with the name include:

- Aida Woolf (1886–1967), a British dress designer
- Arthur Woolf (1766–1837), English engineer, best known for invention of a compound steam engine
- Benjamin Edward Woolf (1836–1901), British-American playwright, composer and journalist
- Cecil Woolf (1927–2019), English author and publisher
- Daniel Woolf (b. 1958), principal of Queen's University in Kingston, Ontario
- Dominique Woolf (b. 1978), English food writer and entrepreneur
- Edgar Allan Woolf (1881–1943), American playwright and co-author of the script for The Wizard of Oz (1939 film)
- Dame Fiona Woolf (b. 1948), Lord Mayor of London
- Gabriel Woolf (b. 1932) British film, radio and television actor
- George Woolf (1910–1946), Canadian horse-racing jockey
- Harry Woolf (1923–2003), American historian of science, provost of Johns Hopkins University and Director of the Institute for Advanced Study
- Harry Woolf, Baron Woolf, Lord Chief Justice of England and Wales
- Herbert M. Woolf (1880–1964), American businessman and racehorse owner
- Jack Woolf (1924–2014), American academic
- Jimmy Woolf (1916–2003), South African footballer who played for Southampton F.C.
- Leonard Woolf (1880–1969), author and husband of Virginia
- Meg Woolf (1923–2023), English artist
- Raphael Woolf, British philosopher
- Russell Woolf, Western Australian media personality
- Virginia Woolf (1882–1941), English author and feminist
