= Binyamin Ze'ev =

Binyamin Ze'ev, Benjamin Ze'ev, Benjamin Wolf is a doublet Jewish given name: Binyamin + Ze'ev (Ze'ev means "Wolf"). "Wolf" and "Ze'ev" are sometimes used interchangeably. Notable people with this name include:

- Benjamin Wolf Löw
- Benjamin Wolf Prerau
- Binyamin Ze'ev Kahane
- Theodor Herzl
- Velvel Zbarjer
- Wolfgang von Weisl
- Wolf Heidenheim

== See also ==
- Ben patronymics:
  - Aaron ben Benjamin Wolf
  - Judah Stadthagen, Judah ben Benjamin Wolf Stadthagen
- Benjamin Wolff
