= Velvel =

- Gender: Male

Origin
- Origin: Yiddish
- Meaning: "Little wolf"

Other names
- Alternative spelling: Velvl, Welwel
- Related names: Wolf, Ze'ev, Zev Wolf

Velvel, Velvl (Yiddish: װעלװעל, װעלװל), or Welwel is a Yiddish masculine given name, meaning "little wolf." It is a diminutive of the name Volf, and often paired with the Hebrew name Benjamin or Ze'ev, as in Genesis 49:27 the tribe of Benjamin is compared to a wolf, and Ze'ev means wolf. Notable people with the name include:

- Velvl Chernnin (born 1958), Yiddish poet, Israeli ethnographer, translator, and literary scholar
- Velvl Greene (1928–2011), Canadian–American–Israeli scientist and academic
- Velvel Kahan or William Kahan (born 1933), Canadian mathematician and computer scientist
- Velvel Pasternak (1933–2019), Canadian musicologist
- Velvel Soloveitchik (1886–1959), Orthodox rabbi and rosh yeshiva of the Brisk yeshiva in Jerusalem
- Velvel Zbarjer (1824–1884), Broder singer (Jewish itinerant performer)
