= Kitzis =

Kitzis, Kitzes (Hebrew: קיציס, Yiddish: קיצעס) may refer to:

- Eyal Kitzis, an Israeli actor
- Ze'ev Wolf Kitzes, hasidic rabbi

== See also ==
- Edward "Eddy" Lawrence Kitsis, American screenwriter and television producer
