= Zebulon (disambiguation) =

Zebulon is the sixth son of Jacob and Leah in the Hebrew Bible.

Zebulon, Zebulun or Zébulon may also refer to:

== Bible ==
- Tribe of Zebulun, ancient Israelite tribe, descendants of Zebulon

== Characters from popular culture ==
- Sgt. Zebulon Gant, a character of the film The Last Samurai
- Zebulon, a character ("the grandfather") in the American television series The Waltons
- Zebulon Prescott, a character in the American Western film How the West Was Won
- Zebulon Macahan, a character in the American Western television series How the West Was Won
- Zebulon, a character in the animated television series The Magic Roundabout
- Zebulon, titular character of a historical novel by the Georgian postmodernist writer Jemal Karchkhadze

== Music ==
- Zebulon (album), a 1998 album by American jazz musician Michael Bisio
- Zébulon (band), music group from Quebec, Canada
- Zebulon Cafe Concert, music venue and bar in Los Angeles, California
- "Zebulon", a song on the album All Days Are Nights: Songs for Lulu by Rufus Wainwright
- "Zebulon", a song on the album Tabula Rasa by Einstürzende Neubauten

== Places ==
- Zebulon, Georgia, U.S.
- Zebulon, North Carolina, U.S.
- Zebulon Valley or Zvulun Valley, part of Israel's northern coastal plain in the Galilee
- Zevulun Regional Council, an Israeli administrative subdivision in the above valley.

== Trains ==
- Zébulon, a prototype TGV train
- Zébulon (Paris Metro), former prototype Paris Metro rolling stock

== People with the given name ==
- Zebulun (Khazar) (9th century), Jewish Turkic ruler of the Khazars
- Zebulon Vance (1830–1894), American Confederate colonel and North Carolina Governor
- Zebulon Baird, American politician
- Zebulon Brockway (1827–1920), American penologist
- Zebulon Butler (1731–1795), American colonial soldier and leader
- Leonid Gofshtein (1953–2015), Israeli chess grandmaster
- Zevulun Hammer (1936–1998), Israeli politician, minister and Deputy Prime Minister
- Zvulun Kalfa (born 1962), Israeli politician
- Zavel Kwartin (1874–1952), Russian-born cantor and composer
- Zebulon Aiton Lash (1846–1920), Canadian lawyer, civil servant, and businessman
- Zebulon Moshiashvili (1971–2023), Israeli actor, producer and comedian
- Zevulun Orlev (born 1945), Israeli politician and a former Knesset member
- Zebulon Pike (1779–1813), American soldier, and eponym of Pikes Peak in Colorado
- Zebulon Pinto (1852–1879), Jewish economist, engineer, physicist, chemist and mathematician in Tsarist Russia
- Zablon Simintov (born 1959), the last Jew of Afghanistan
- Zebulon Scoville, NASA flight director and lead flight director of Crew Dragon Demo-2
- Zebulon Weaver (1872–1948), American politician

== See also ==
- Zeb (disambiguation)
- Zebuleon, an angel mentioned in the Greek Apocalypse of Ezra
