= Nafi Mawla Ibn Umar =

Saudi Arabian faqih and muhaddith

Nafi bin Sarjis Abu Abdullah ad-Dailami

Personal life
- Died: c. 735 or 736 Medina, Umayyad Caliphate
- Era: Rashidun-Umayyad
- Notable work: Golden chain of narrations in Hadith
- Occupation: Ulama; Teacher

Religious life
- Religion: Islam
- Movement: Tabi'un

Muslim leader
- Disciple of: Ibn Umar
- Influenced by: Abdullah ibn Umar, Abu Sa'id al-Khudri
- Influenced: Malik ibn Anas, Ibn Shihab al-Zuhri, Ayyub as-Sakhtiyani

Nafi bin Sarjis Abu Abdullah ad-Dailami (Arabic: نافع بن سارجيس أبو عبد الله الديلمي), also known as Nafi` Mawla ibn `Umar (Arabic: نافع مولى بن عمر), was a scholar of Fiqh jurisprudence and muhaddith from the Tabiun generation who resided in Medina. He was a student of Ibn Umar.

== Biography ==
Nafi was originally a resident of Daylam (now including the Gilan region in Iran) who was captured during Muslim conquest of Persia and became a slave before being manumitted by Abdullah ibn Umar. He studied religion from the Companions of the Prophet, and especially from Abdullah bin Umar and Abu Sa'id al-Khudri.

He became a teacher for prominent scholars such as Ibn Shihab al-Zuhri, Ayyub as-Sakhtiyani, and Malik ibn Anas.

He became Mufti during the caliphate of Umar ibn Abdul Aziz and was sent by caliph to teach Islam to peoples in Egypt.

=== Golden chain of narration ===
Malik's chain of narrators was considered the most authentic and called Silsilat al-Dhahab or "The Golden Chain of Narrators" by notable hadith scholars including Muhammad al-Bukhari. The 'Golden Chain' of narration (i.e., that considered by the scholars of Hadith to be the most authentic) consists of Malik, who narrated from Nafi‘ Mawla ibn ‘Umar, who narrated from Ibn Umar, who narrated from Muhammad.

Malik even goes as far as to say, "If I heard (hadith) from Nafi' narrating from Ibn Umar, I would not care if I did not hear it from someone else(as it is undoubtly authentic)."

Scholars such as al-Bukhari, al-Asqalani and Abu Ali al-Khalil have high confidence for hadiths authenticity narrated by Nafi. Sahih bukhari and Sahih Muslim contained at least 188 hadiths of various matters narrated by Nafi.

Modern researchers of Hadiths has attested the hadiths narrated from Nafi line were authentic by using method of Ibn Hajar al-Asqalani of Jarh wa Ta'dil(narrators biography evaluation). Ze'ev Maghen stated the authenticity of Nafi narration were "almost peerless", while Professor Bashar Awad, editor of Tirmidhi collection, and winner of King Faisal Prize award, also noted the "golden chain" of Nafi were often supported with validation by another Tabi'un-to-Sahabah chains.

=== Death ===
Nafi is estimated to have died in 117 AH (735-6 AD), although there are other chroniclers who say that in 120 H.

== Early Islamic scholars ==
Early Islamic scholars

Muhammad, The final Messenger of God (570–632) the Constitution of Medina, taught the Quran, and advised his companions
Abdullah ibn Masud (died 653) taught	Ali (607–661) fourth caliph taught	Aisha, Muhammad's wife and Abu Bakr's daughter taught	Abd Allah ibn Abbas (618–687) taught	Zayd ibn Thabit (610–660) taught	Umar (579–644) second caliph taught	Abu Hurairah (603–681) taught
Alqama ibn Qays (died 681) taught	Husayn ibn Ali (626–680) taught	Qasim ibn Muhammad ibn Abi Bakr (657–725) taught and raised by Aisha	Urwah ibn Zubayr (died 713) taught by Aisha, he then taught	Said ibn al-Musayyib (637–715) taught	Abdullah ibn Umar (614–693) taught	Abd Allah ibn al-Zubayr (624–692) taught by Aisha, he then taught
Ibrahim al-Nakha’i taught	Ali ibn Husayn Zayn al-Abidin (659–712) taught	Hisham ibn Urwah (667–772) taught	Ibn Shihab al-Zuhri (died 741) taught	Salim ibn Abd-Allah ibn Umar taught	Umar ibn Abdul Aziz (682–720) raised and taught by Abdullah ibn Umar
Hammad ibn Abi Sulayman taught	Muhammad al-Baqir (676–733) taught	Farwah bint al-Qasim Jafar's mother
Abu Hanifa (699–767) wrote Al Fiqh Al Akbar and Kitab Al-Athar, jurisprudence followed by Sunni, Sunni Sufi, Barelvi, Deobandi, Zaidiyyah and originally by the Fatimid and taught	Zayd ibn Ali (695–740)	Ja'far bin Muhammad Al-Baqir (702–765) Muhammad and Ali's great great grand son, jurisprudence followed by Shia, he taught	Malik ibn Anas (711–795) wrote Muwatta, jurisprudence from early Medina period now mostly followed by Maliki Sunnis in North Africa, and taught	Al-Waqidi (748–822) wrote history books like Kitab al-Tarikh wa al-Maghazi, student of Malik ibn Anas	Abu Muhammad Abdullah ibn Abdul Hakam (died 829) wrote biographies and history books, student of Malik ibn Anas
Abu Yusuf (729–798) wrote Usul al-fiqh	Muhammad al-Shaybani (749–805)	al-Shafi‘i (767–820) wrote Al-Risala, jurisprudence followed by Shafi'i Sunnis and Sufis, and taught	Ismail ibn Ibrahim	Ali ibn al-Madini (778–849) wrote The Book of Knowledge of the Companions	Ibn Hisham (died 833) wrote early history and As-Sirah an-Nabawiyyah, Muhammad's biography
Isma'il ibn Ja'far (719–775)	Musa al-Kadhim (745–799)	Ahmad ibn Hanbal (780–855) wrote Musnad Ahmad ibn Hanbal jurisprudence followed by Hanbali Sunnis and Sufis	Muhammad al-Bukhari (810–870) wrote Sahih al-Bukhari hadith books	Muslim ibn al-Hajjaj (815–875) wrote Sahih Muslim hadith books	Dawud al-Zahiri (815–883/4) founded the Zahiri school	Muhammad ibn Isa at-Tirmidhi (824–892) wrote Jami` at-Tirmidhi hadith books	Al-Baladhuri (died 892) wrote early history Futuh al-Buldan, Genealogies of the Nobles
Ibn Majah (824–887) wrote Sunan ibn Majah hadith book	Abu Dawood (817–889) wrote Sunan Abu Dawood Hadith Book
Muhammad ibn Ya'qub al-Kulayni (864- 941) wrote Kitab al-Kafi hadith book followed by Twelver Shia	Muhammad ibn Jarir al-Tabari (838–923) wrote History of the Prophets and Kings, Tafsir al-Tabari	Abu al-Hasan al-Ash'ari (874–936) wrote Maqālāt al-islāmīyīn, Kitāb al-luma, Kitāb al-ibāna 'an usūl al-diyāna
Ibn Babawayh (923–991) wrote Man La Yahduruhu al-Faqih jurisprudence followed by Twelver Shia	Sharif Razi (930–977) wrote Nahj al-Balagha followed by Twelver Shia	Nasir al-Din al-Tusi (1201–1274) wrote jurisprudence books followed by Ismaili and Twelver Shia	Al-Ghazali (1058–1111) wrote The Niche for Lights, The Incoherence of the Philosophers, The Alchemy of Happiness on Sufism	Rumi (1207–1273) wrote Masnavi, Diwan-e Shams-e Tabrizi on Sufism
Key: Some of Muhammad's Companions	Key: Taught in Medina	Key: Taught in Iraq	Key: Worked in Syria	Key: Travelled extensively collecting the sayings of Muhammad and compiled books of hadith	Key: Worked in Persia

== See also ==
- Wahb ibn Munabbih
- Maliki Madhhab

== Bibliography ==
- Abu Alabas, Belal (2020). Modern Hadith Studies Continuing Debates and New Approaches. Edinburgh University Press. p. 119. ISBN 9781474441810.
- Ibn Anas, Malik (2008). Al-Muwatta Of Iman Malik Ibn Anas. Taylor and francis. p. 3, 4, 10, 14, 16, 17, 27, 29, 32, 37, 38, 49, 51, 58, 61, 67, 68, 74, 78, 87, 92, 93, 108, 114, 124, 128, 138, 139, 151, 156, 161, 171, 196, 210, 239, 245, 253, 312, 349, 410, 412. ISBN 9781136150982. 9789791142199.
- Al-Indunisi, Ahmad Nahrawi Abdus Salam (2008). Ensiklopedia Imam Syafi'i [Imam Shafii encyclopedia]. Hikmah. p. 388. ISBN 978-9791142199. 9789791142199.
- Sallabi, Ali Muhammad (2017). Biografi Umar bin Abdul Aziz: Khilafah Pembaru dari Bani Umayyah [Umar ibn Abdul Aziz biography: Reformer capiph of Banu Umayyah]. Vol. 3. Translated by Bn Mac-Gluckin de Slane. Paris: Pustaka Al-Kautsar.
- Khallikan, Ibnu (1843). Kitab Wafayat Ala'yan. Ibn Khallikan's Biographical Dictionary. Vol. 3. Translated by Bn Mac-Gluckin de Slane. Paris: Benjamin Duprat.
- Maghen, Ze'ev (2012). After Hardship Cometh Ease The Jews as Backdrop for Muslim Moderation. Taylor and francis. p. 177. ISBN 9783110910476.
- Ma'rouf, Bashar Awad (2018). "Professor Bashar Awad".
- Wahid, Abdul Hakim (2017). "The Authenticity of Hadith Narrated by Nafi' the Mawla of Ibn 'Umar". Proceedings of the International Conference on Qur'an and Hadith Studies (ICQHS 2017). Vol. 137. p. 27-28. doi:10.2991/icqhs-17.2018.4. ISBN 978-94-6252-456-9.
