= Moses ben Shem-Tob ibn Habib =

Hebrew grammarian from the middle ages

Moses ben Shem-Tob ibn Ḥabib
- Born: c. 1450; Lisbon, Portugal
- Died: c. 1520; Southern Italy
- Occupations: Grammarian, poet, translator, philosopher
- Writing career
- Language: Hebrew

Moses ben Shem-Tob ibn Ḥabib (Hebrew: משה בן שם־טוב אִבְּן חביב, romanized: Moše ben Šemṭov ibn Ḥaviv; c. 1450–c. 1520) was a Hebrew grammarian, poet, translator, and philosopher.

A native of Lisbon, he left his native country before the Jewish expulsion. He resided in the Levant for a time before relocating to southern Italy, where he died in the early 16th century.

== Work ==
As a grammarian, Ibn Ḥabib was influenced by Efodi, who sought to ground Hebrew grammar in logic. He wrote a grammatical work titled Peraḥ Shoshan ('Rose Flower'), composed in Naples between June 16, 1484, and December 15, 1484, referenced by Ibn Ḥabib himself in Darke No'am ('Ways of Delight') and extensively cited by Abraham de Balmes in Miḳneh Abraham. This work is divided into seven sections (שערים), each containing multiple chapters (פרקים). His primary sources included Ḥayyuj, Ibn Janaḥ, Ibn Ezra, and Efodi.

He also authored a second, smaller grammatical work entitled Marpe Lashon ('Healer of the Tongue'), summarizing the principles of Hebrew language in catechetic form, completed in Naples in 1484. It was published alongside Darke No'am, a summary of Hebrew prosody based on Aristotle's Poetics, completed in Bitonto in 1486. The works first appeared in Constantinople around 1520 and were later included in various compilations, such as Diḳduḳim (Venice, 1506) and Devar Ṭov by Abigdor Levi of Glogau (Prague, 1783). An edition by Heidenheim was published in Rödelheim in 1806.

In Otranto, Ibn Ḥabib wrote a commentary on Jedaiah Bedersi's Beḥinat 'Olam ( Examination of the World') for his student Azariah ben Joseph. In this work, Ibn Ḥabib mentions his intention to create a work titled Ḳiryat Arba' on the number four, but no further information about this work exists. The commentary was first published in Constantinople around 1520, with subsequent editions in Ferrara (1551) and Zolkiev (1741). Extracts were also incorporated into works by other commentators, including Yom-Tov Lipmann Heller, Eleazar ben Solomon in Migdanot Eleazar, and Jacob ben Nahum of Tyszowce in Or Ḥakhamim.

Ibn Ḥabib also translated the medical work She'elot u-Teshuvot, a collection of questions and answers on the six natural necessities of the human body. The original work is attributed to "Albertus," likely referring to Albertus Magnus.
