= Ze'ev =

Given name

Ze'ev, Zev
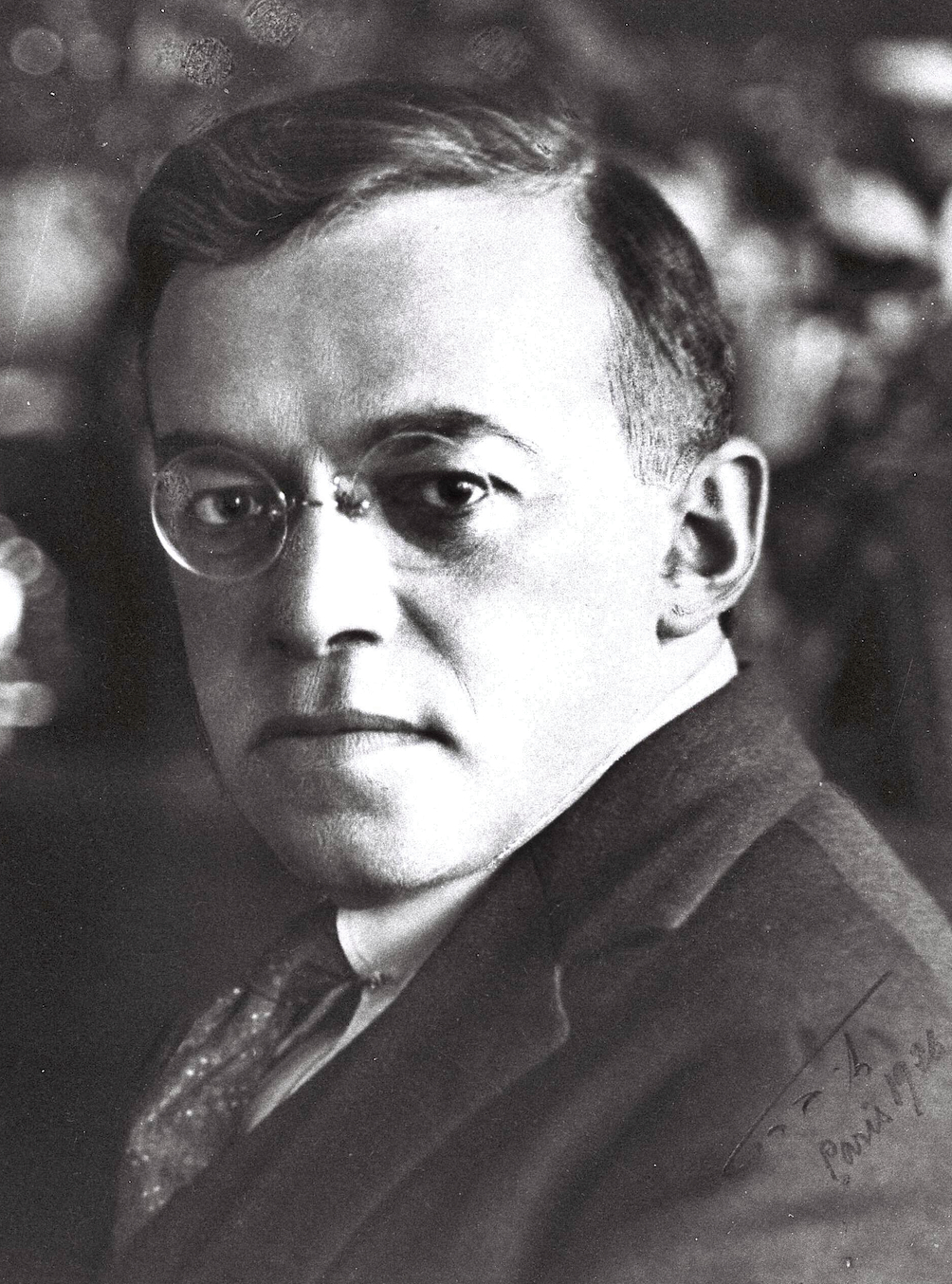
- Ze'ev Jabotinsky
- Pronunciation: [zeʔev]
- Gender: Male
- Language: Hebrew

Origin
- Meaning: Wolf

Other names
- Alternative spelling: Zeev, Zev, Zeeb, Zeb, Seff
- Related names: Volf (װאלף)

Ze'ev (Hebrew: זְאֵב, Zeév), also spelled Zeev or Zev, is a masculine given name of Hebrew origin meaning wolf. Diminutive forms of the name are Zevik and Ze'evik.

The name used among Ashkenazi Jews is often paired with the name Benjamin (such as Binyamin Ze'ev), referencing the description of Benjamin in Genesis as a "wolf that raveneth", with the Yiddish name "Wolf" (װאָלף) (as Zev Wolf), or even as a triplet (as in Benjamin Zev Wolf).

The Tanakh mentions a person directly named Ze'ev, one of the Midianite leaders defeated by the Judge Gideon (see Oreb and Zeeb).

== People with the given name ==
=== Ze'ev ===
- Ze'ev (caricaturist) (1923–2002), Israeli caricaturist
- Ze'ev Aleksandrowicz (1905–1992), Israeli photographer
- Zeev Aram (1931–2021), British furniture and interior designer
- Ze'ev Almog (born 1935), Israeli admiral
- Ze'ev Ben-Haim (1907–2013), Israeli linguist
- Zeev Ben-Zvi (1904–1952), Israeli sculptor
- Ze'ev Bielski (born 1949), Israeli politician and diplomat
- Ze'ev Boim (1943–2011), Israeli politician
- Zeev Buium (born 2005), American NHL Hockey Player
- Ze'ev Chafets (born 1947), American writer
- Ze'ev Chomsky (1896–1977), American scholar
- Ze'ev Drori (born 1940), Israeli businessman
- Ze'ev Elkin (born 1971), Israeli politician
- Ze'ev Friedman (1944–1972), Israeli weightlifter
- Ze'ev Haimovich (born 1983), Israeli football player
- Ze'ev Herzog (born 1941), Israeli archaeologist
- Ze'ev Jabotinsky (1880–1940), Russian Jewish leader
- Ze'ev Maghen (born 1964), Israeli historian
- Zeev Maoz (born 1945), American political scientist
- Zeev Nehari (1915–1978), Israeli mathematician
- Ze'ev Raban (1890–1970), Israeli artist
- Zeev Rechter (1899–1960), Israeli architect
- Zeev Reiss (1917–1996), Israeli scientist
- Ze'ev Revach (born 1940), Israeli actor and comedian
- Ze'ev Ronai (born 1956), Israeli-American cancer research scientist
- Zeev Rudnick (born 1961), Israeli mathematician
- Ze'ev Safrai (born 1948), Israeli historian
- Ze'ev Schiff (1932–2007), Israeli journalist
- Ze'ev Sherf (1904–1984), Israeli politician
- Zeev Sternhell (1935–2020), Israeli historian
- Ze'ev Wolf Kitzes (1685–1788), Polish rabbi
- Ze'ev Zrizi (1916–2011), Israeli politician

=== Zev ===
- Zev Aelony (1938–2009), American civil rights activist
- Zev Asher (1963–2013), Canadian musician
- Zev Braun (1928–2019), American film producer
- Zev Buffman (1930–2020), American theater producer
- Zev Golan, Israeli historian
- Zev ben Shimon Halevi (1933–2020), English author born Warren Kenton
- Zev Hirsch Bernstein (1847–1907), American writer
- Zev Siegl (born 1955), American businessman
- Zev Sufott (1927–2014), Israeli diplomat
- Zev Taublieb (born 1993), American soccer player
- Zev Vilnay (1900–1988), Israeli geographer
- Zev Wolf (disambiguation), several people
- Zev Wolfson (1928–2012), American businessman
- Zev Yaroslavsky (born 1948), American politician

=== Zehev ===
- Zehev Tadmor (born 1937), Israeli chemical engineer and president of the Technion-Israel Institute of Technology

== People with the surname ==
- Aharon Ze'ev (1900–1968), Israeli poet, writer (including writing for children), editor, and educator
- Nissim Ze'ev (born 1951), Israeli politician
- Oren Zeev (born 1964), technology investor

== Fictional characters ==
- Ze'ev Kesley, fictional character in The Lunar Chronicles fantasy novels
- Zev Bellringer, fictional character in the television series Lexx
- Zev Senesca, fictional character in the 1980 film The Empire Strikes Back

== See also ==
- Zev (disambiguation)
- Ben-Zeev, a surname
- Ze'evi, a surname
- Zev Wolf (disambiguation)
