= Zev =

Zev may refer to:

== People and fictional characters ==
- Ze'ev, also spelt Zev, a given name and surname (includes a list of people and fictional characters with the name)
- Zev, Mongolian name of Jebe, a general of Genghis Khan
- Z'EV (1951–2017), American musician

== Other uses ==
- Zev (horse)
- Z Electric Vehicle, a company in West Virginia
- Zero-emissions vehicle, a vehicle that doesn't emit any greenhouse gases from itself or from the source or energy production.

== See also ==
- Zeb (disambiguation)
