= Zeb (name) =

Zeb (variant spelling Zebb) is both a masculine given name and a surname. As a given name, it may be a short form of Zebulon, Zebadiah or Zebedee, but is now more common as a given name in its own right. In fact, it can also be an alternate spelling of the Hebrew word ze'ev (זְאֵב), meaning "wolf". Notable people with the name include:

== Given name ==
- Zeb Alley (1928–2013), American lawyer, lobbyist and politician
- Zeb Eaton (1920–1989), American baseball player
- Zeb Little (born 1968), American politician
- Zeb Powell (born 2000), American snowboarder
- Zeb Soanes (born 1976), British radio announcer
- Zeb Taia (born 1984), New Zealand rugby league player
- Zeb Terry (1891–1988), American Major League Baseball player
- Zeb Turner (1915–1978), American country music songwriter and guitarist
- Zeb V. Walser (1863–1940), American attorney and politician, Attorney General of North Carolina
- Zeb Wells, American comic book writer

== Surname ==
- Miangul Jahan Zeb (1908–1987), ruler of the princely state of Swat, now part of Pakistan

== Nickname ==
- David "Zeb" Cook, game designer best known for his work on Advanced Dungeons & Dragons
