= Avigdor Glogauer =

Judaic scholar (active 18th-19th century)

- Born: c. 1725; Glogau, Bohemia, Habsburg Empire
- Died: 1810
- Writing career
- Pen name: Alem (אל״ם)
- Language: Hebrew
- Literary movement: Haskalah

Avigdor ben Simḥah ha-Levi Glogauer (Hebrew: אביגדור בן שמחה הלוי מגלוגא; c. 1725–1810), also known as Avigdor Levi (אביגדור לוי) and by the acronym Alem (אל״ם), was a German Jewish grammarian and poet.

== Biography ==
Avigdor Glogauer was born to poor Jewish parents in the lower Silesian town of Glogau. His father Simḥah was a pious Talmud teacher, and his mother Bräunche was a member of the prominent Teomim rabbinical family. Glogauer was a private tutor for some time in Berlin, where he joined Moses Mendelssohn's circle of maskilim. He moved to Prague in 1768, and there became a teacher.

Early in 1773, while traveling through Saxony, he was arrested on a false charge of theft, and lingered in the prison of Pirna for ten months. During his confinement he pursued his studies in the Tanakh, the Talmud, and medieval Hebrew philosophy without interruption. A letter from Mendelssohn, dated January 13, 1774, convinced the authorities to clear him of all suspicion and set him at liberty. Through the aid of Isaac Dessau and his relative, Rabbi Hirschel Levin of Berlin, he was enabled to return to Prague.

== Work ==
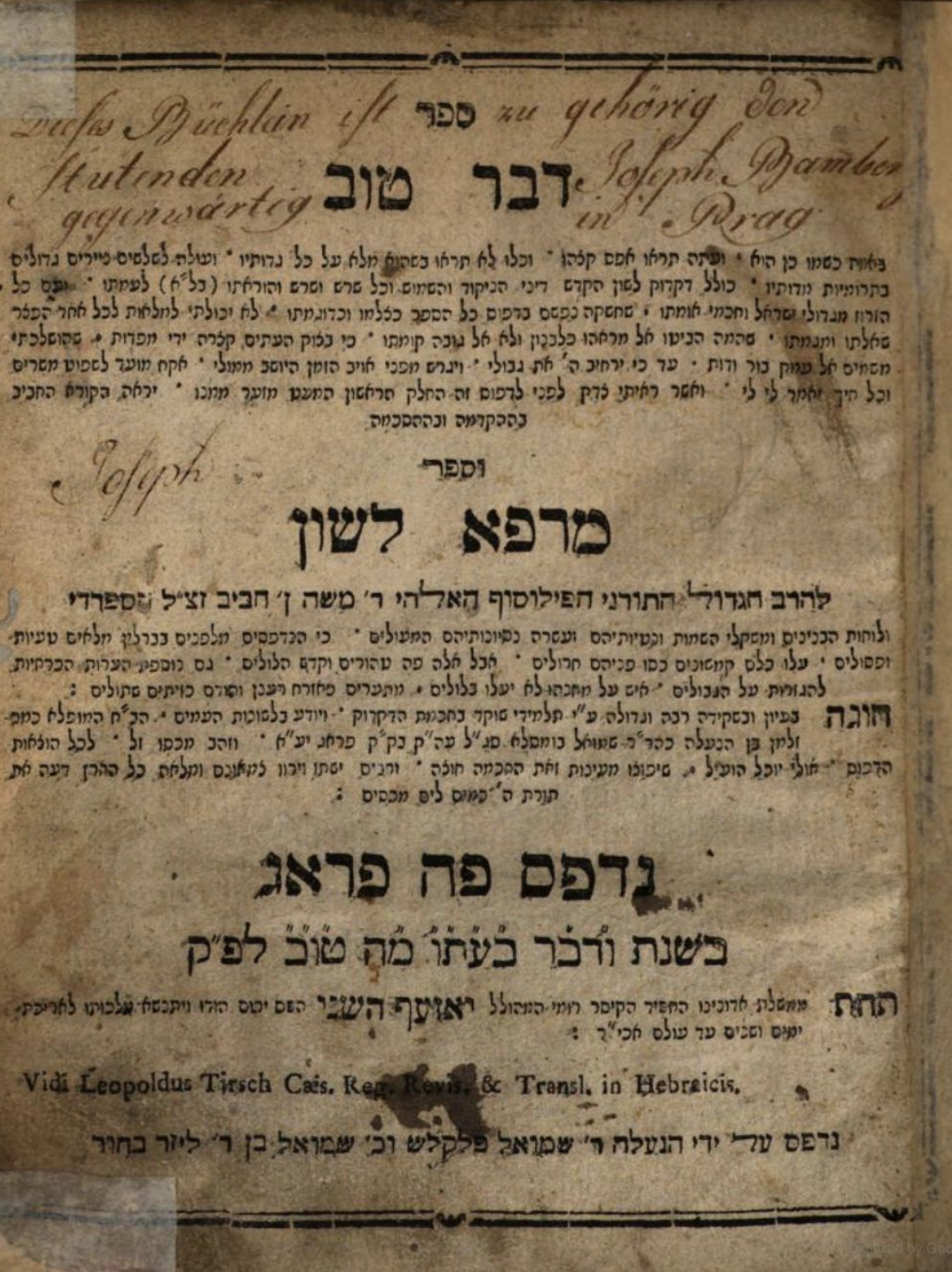
Title page of Davar tov (1783)

The first work Avigdor published was an elementary Hebrew grammar entitled Davar tov ('A Good Thing'; Prague, 1783), with a haskama by Rabbi Yechezkel Landau. The book included a table of conjugations, as well as an excerpt of Moses ibn Ḥabib's linguistic treatise Marpe lashon ('Healing of Speech'). In 1792 he edited the first series of letters which Mendelssohn had addressed to him, and in 1797 supplemented it with a second series. This supplement forms the appendix to his didactic poem, Ḥotem tokhnit ('The Perfect Seal'), which aims at proving that the teachings of the Bible surpass all the systems of philosophy ever invented, from Socrates to Immanuel Kant. In 1802 Avigdor edited the Pentateuch with the commentary of Mendelssohn and an introduction of his own. The last of his literary efforts was a poem included in Ze'ev Wolf Buchner's Tzaḥut ha-melitzah (Berlin, 1810).

=== Publications ===
- Glogauer, Avigdor (1783). Davar tov [A Good Thing]. Prague.
- Glogauer, Avigdor (1794). Iggerot ha-Remad [Letters with Moses Mendelssohn]. Vienna: Anton Schmid.
- Glogauer, Avigdor (1797). Ḥotem tokhnit [The Perfect Seal]. Vienna: Anton Schmid.
- Glogauer, Avigdor (1835) [1810]. "Shir nifla". In Buchner, Ze'ev Wolf (ed.). Tzaḥut ha-melitzah. Vienna. pp. 214–216.
