= MF 67 =

Paris Metro train

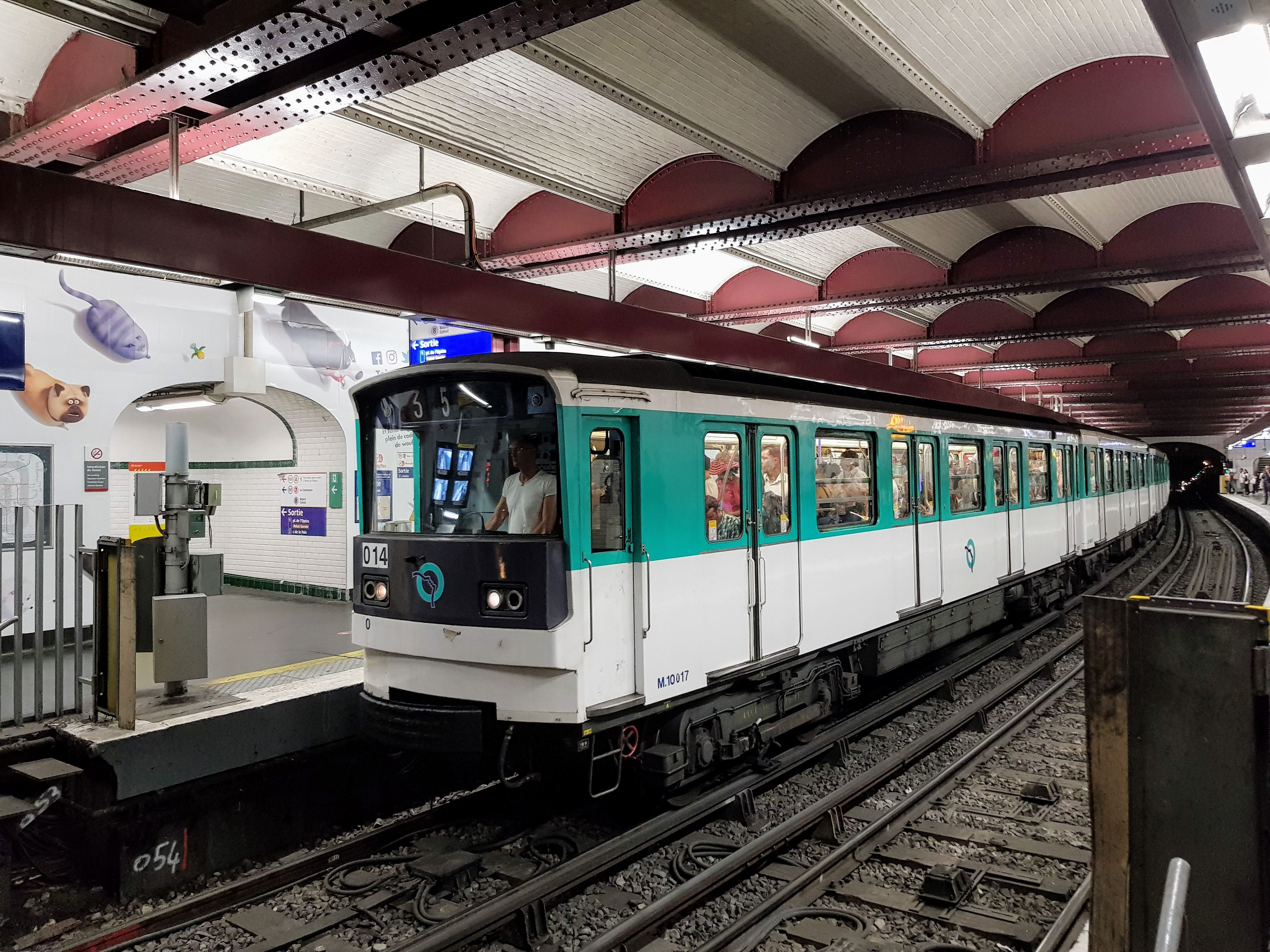
- MF 67 train at Opéra on Line 3

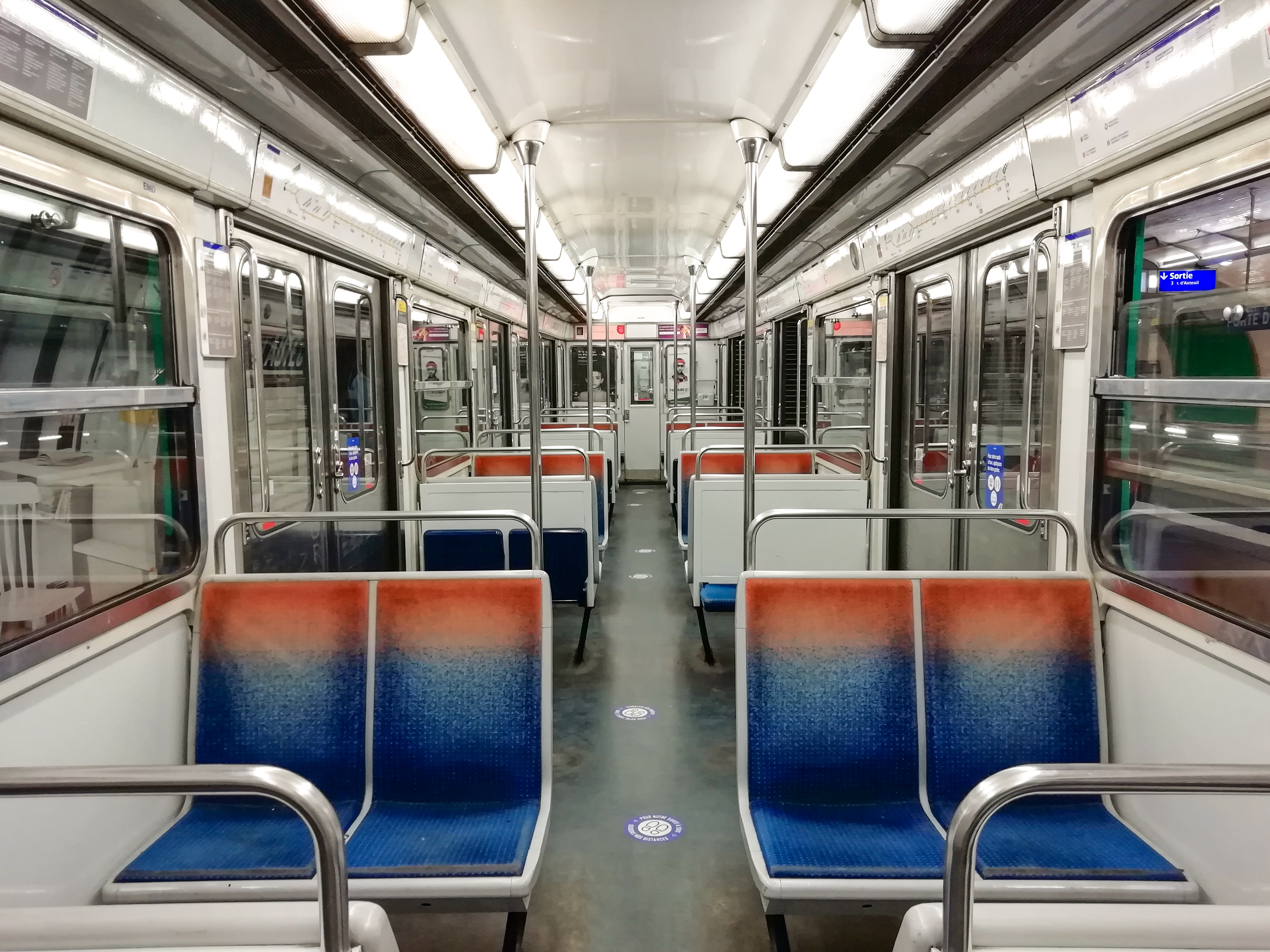
- Interior of MF 67 train
- In service: 1968–present
- Manufacturers: Brissonneau and Lotz and CIMT
- Replaced: Sprague-Thomson
- Constructed: 1967–1976
- Refurbished: 1995–2006
- Scrapped: 2009–
- Number built: 1,482 cars
- Number in service: 657 cars
- Number scrapped: 823 cars
- Successor: MF 01, MF 19
- Formation: 3 cars (Line 3bis); 5 cars (Lines 3, 10 and 12)
- Operator: RATP
- Depots: St Fargeau (Lines 3 & 3bis); Auteuil (Line 10); Vaugirard (Line 12)
- Line served: Paris Metro Paris Metro Line 3 Paris Metro Line 3bis Paris Metro Line 10 Paris Metro Line 12

Specifications
- Train length: 3-car set: 45 m (147 ft 8 in); 5-car set: 75 m (246 ft 1 in)
- Car length: Motor car: 15,145 mm (49 ft 8.3 in); Trailer car: 14,390 mm (47 ft 3 in)
- Width: 2,400 mm (7 ft 10 in)
- Doors: 4 per side, per car
- Maximum speed: Design: 80 km/h (50 mph); Service: 70 km/h (43 mph)
- Traction system: Resistor control
- Traction motors: MF1 (MF67 A1, B1/C1/D); MF2 (MF67 A2/B2/C2/E); MF4 (MF67F)
- Power output: Twin-motor bogies: 1,272 kW (1,706 hp); Single-motor bogies: 1,080 kW (1,448 hp)
- Acceleration: 0.7 m/s^{2} (2.3 ft/s^{2})
- Deceleration: Emergency: 1.0 m/s^{2} (3.3 ft/s^{2}); Service: 1.15 m/s^{2} (3.8 ft/s^{2})
- Electric systems: Third rail, 750 V DC
- Current collection: Contact shoe
- Bogies: ANF (Mf67 A2-C2 -E); Düwag UNIMOT(Mf67 A1-C1); CL121 (Mf67D); MTE (Mf67F)
- Braking systems: Series A, B, C & D: Rheostatic, disc; Series E & F: Regenerative, disc
- Track gauge: 1,435 mm (4 ft 8 1/2 in) standard gauge

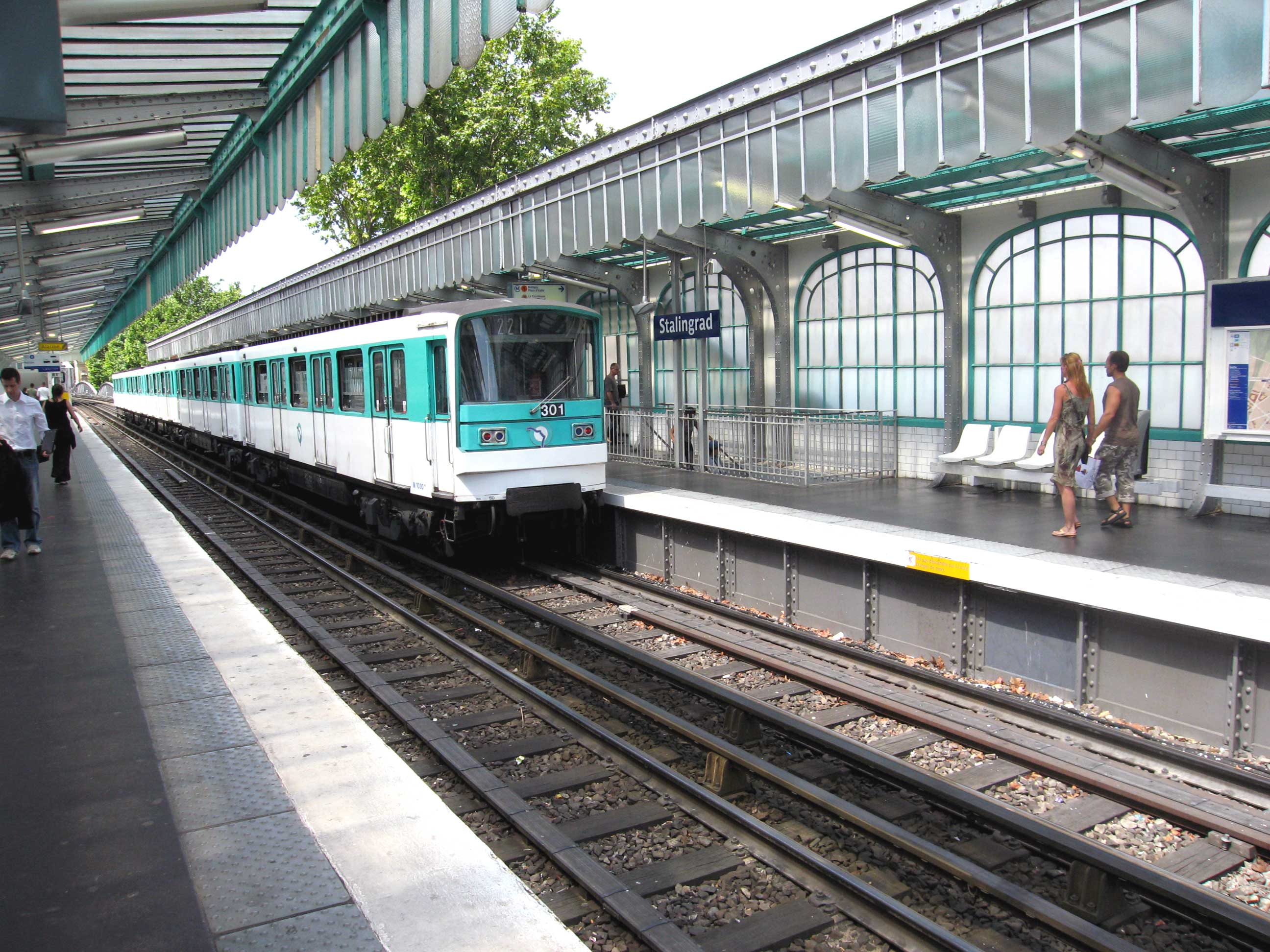
MF 67 on Line 2, at Stalingrad station

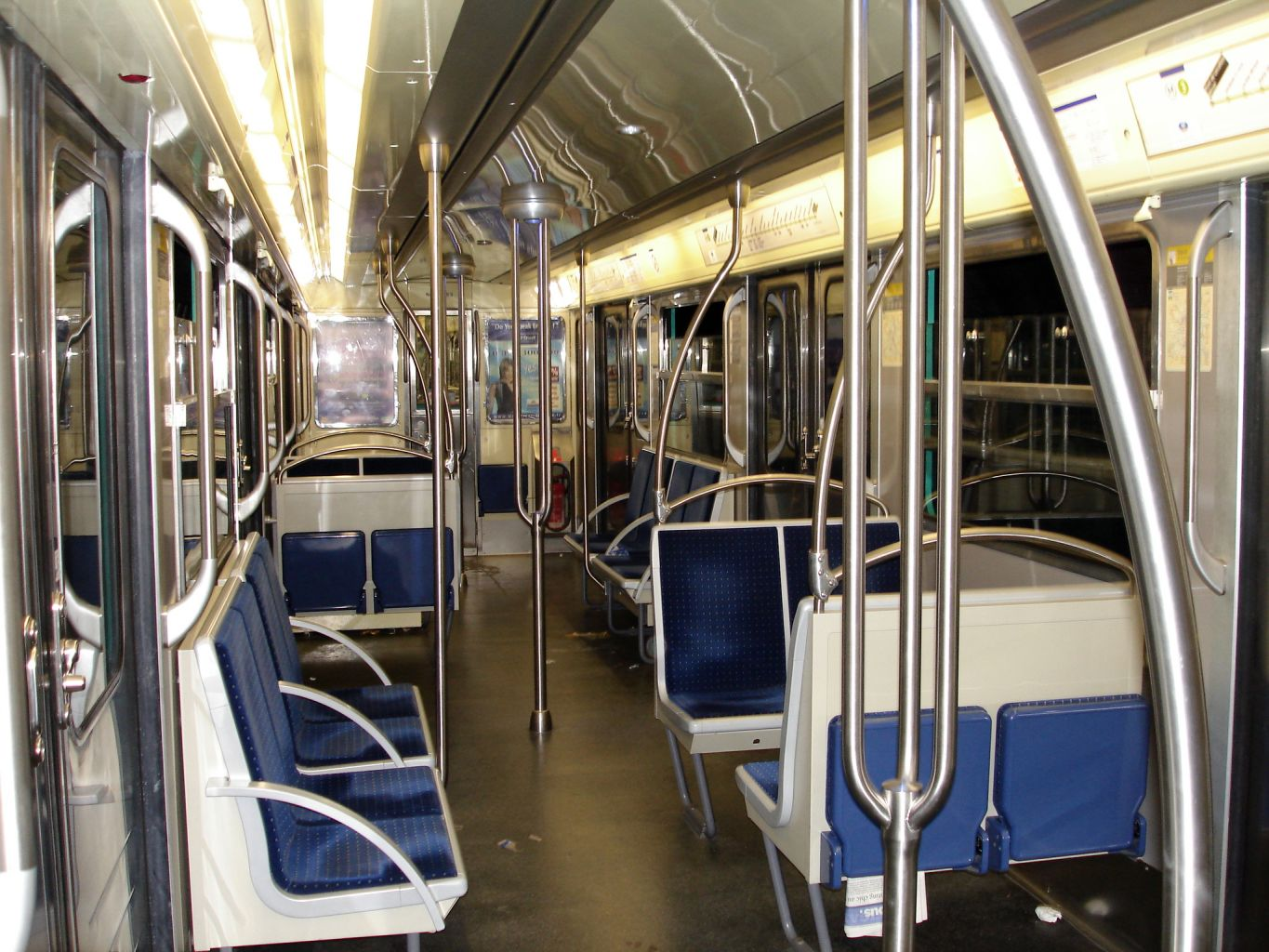
Renovated interior (Line 3)

Sound of the arrival of a MF 67 outdoors (L12)

Sound of a noisy MF 67 ride (L12)

Sound of static converter (L12)

The MF 67 (French: Métro Fer appel d'offres de 1967; English: Steel-wheeled metro ordered in 1967) is a fleet of steel-wheel electric multiple unit trains for the Paris Metro. The first MF 67 trains entered service on Line 3 in July 1968, and became one of the biggest orders for the Metro, with 1,482 cars constructed. The need to replace the Sprague-Thomson fleet, as well as increasing costs associated with the later-cancelled plan to introduce rubber-tyred trains on all Metro lines, were the main factors for the size of the order.

At its peak, during the late 1980s and the early-1990s, the MF 67 operated on eight of the (then) fifteen Metro lines (2, 3 and 3bis, 5, 7bis, 9, 10 and 12): the MF 67 also operated on Lines 7, 8 and 13 (including the old Line 14), all before the introduction of the MF 77 in 1978.

Between 2004 and 2007, the Line 3 sets have been deeply refurbished, adding new lighting, a forced ventilation system, a new black front, rearranged seating, automated announcements, stop indicator lights and door warning lights above the doors. A more moderate refurbishment were done on the trains on lines 3 bis and 9, adding a new black front similar to the ones on line 3 and replacing the old bench seats with single seats. However, sets 129 and 130 from line 12 were transferred to line 3 in 2012 and weren’t renovated, as the renovation of the cars had ended in 2007, thus making them the only non-renovated MF67 sets to run on line 3.

Many MF 67 trains have been removed from service: throughout 1994, the MF 88 displaced the MF 67 from Line 7bis, and from 2008 to 2016, the MF 01 replaced the MF 67 on Lines 2, 5, and 9. The newer MF 67 trains from line 9 were transferred to lines 10 and 12, replacing some of the older MF 67 trains on those lines. The MF 67 remains in service on Lines 3, 3bis, 10 and 12.

As of 2026, they are the oldest trains running on the Metro and their replacement is scheduled between 2025–2034, where the Île-de-France Mobilités intends to replace the remaining MF 67 trains with the MF 19. Replacements began on line 10 in 2025, and will continue with lines 3bis in 2027, 12 in 2028 and 3 in 2031. Line 3 in particular was the first line to receive the MF67 and will be the last line to retire them, being served by the MF 67 continuously for approximately 65 years, rivaling the longevity of the Sprague Thomson trains that ran on Line 2 and 5 for approximately 70 years.

== Conception ==
It was originally envisioned by the RATP to convert all Metro lines to rubber-tyred pneumatic operation. However, this plan was later abandoned due to high costs, which in turn, would have prolonged the service of the aging Sprague-Thomson trainsets to 80 years. Therefore, a new class of steel-wheel rolling stock was developed. During the development phase, the MF 67 was known as the MF 65.

== Series ==
The MF 67 actually comprises seven different series; however, two series of these trains were prototypes.

- Series A (Converted to MF 67D): 200 cars (40 trains) were delivered to Line 3 between 1967–1969. They come in A1 (one motor per bogie) and A2 (two motors per bogie) variants.
  - One train in this series was the Zébulon, a stainless-steel prototype that saw intermittent passenger service, last of which was on Line 9. It was used as a training train for many years, until it succumbed to heavy vandalism in 2010. All cars except for one driving car were scrapped as of 2011.
- Series B (Converted to MF 67A then MF 67D): 6 cars were delivered in 1968 as prototype trains that never saw commercial service. Converted back to MF 67A.
- Series C (Converted to MF 67D): 340 cars (68 trains) delivered to Lines 3 and 7 between 1972 and 1975. Similar to the A series, they come in C1 (one motor per bogie) and C2 (two motors per bogie) variants.
- Series CX (Converted to MF 67D): 16 prototype cars that were fitted with "plug" type door openers, similar to that of the MF 77. These ran on Line 9. Converted back to normal MF67 doors and used as part of MF 67D sets
- Series D: 363 new trailer cars mixed with former MF 67A and MF 67C motor cars that were originally deployed to Lines 3, 5, and 9 between 1973 and 1975. They now operate on Lines 3, 3bis, 10, and 12.
- Series E (now retired): 56 trains that were originally deployed to Lines 2, 7bis, and 8 between 1975 and 1976. Many trains were replaced by the MF 01 cars between 2008 and 2011, though some were displaced much earlier by the MF 88 cars to Line 10. The trains that operated on Line 10 were retired between 2013 and 2016, being replaced by the MF 67 D trains from line 9 when the latter received new MF 01 trains. Five trains were retained for training in the USFRT tunnel, replacing the Zebulon, but they were retired in 2017.
- Series F (now retired): 51 trains that were originally deployed to Lines 7 and 13 between 1976 and 1978. They were redeployed to Line 5. Despite being the youngest series, they have suffered from excessive wear and tear, as well as weather impacts sustained from being stored in the outdoor Bobigny depot. They were replaced by the MF 01 cars between 2011 and 2014.

== Technical specifications ==
- Train-sets delivered: 297 (1482 cars including 9 in reserve)
- Configuration: M+R+M+R+M (except 3bis M+R+M)
- Length: 15.145 m (49 ft 8 1/4 in) (all motor coach), 14.390 m (47 ft 2 9/16 in) (trailers)
- Maximum width: 2.40 m (7 ft 10 1/2 in)
- Power: 1,272 kW (1,706 hp) (12 traction motors on twin-motor bogie) or 1,080 kW (1,450 hp) (6 traction motors on single-motor bogie)
- Braking: rheostatic brake and electric brake on the series E and F
- Bogies: single or twin with pneumatic suspension on the series E and F
- Maximum speed: 80 km/h (50 mph)
- Authorized speed: 70 km/h (43 mph)
- Doors: 4 doors by vis-à-vis manual opening, opening of 1,300 mm (51 3/16 in)
- Air-conditioning: None (forced ventilation on Line 3 sets)

== Service trains ==
Currently, the RATP uses a string of MF 67 "Auteuil Convoy" trains (retired MF 67C trainsets from Line 2 in four-car sets), to supply the Auteuil and Vaugirard Depots. These trains are colored yellow and brown, and serve as auxiliary equipment of the RATP (VMI). They replaced the aging Sprague-Thomson trains.

== Formations ==
47 trains are A1 and C1 sets assigned to line 3 (including sets 129 and 130 that were from line 12 and thus were not renovated). The A2 and C2 sets run on lines 3bis, 10 and 12, with 30 of them assigned to line 10, 51 to line 12 and 6 to line 3bis.

=== Current trainset ===
==== Line 3 ====
	Formation 1 (I)				
Car No.	1	2	3	4	5
Designation	M	B	NA	B	M
Equipment	RS-AC	AC	RS-AC	AC	RS-AC

	Formation 3 (III)				
Car No.	1	2	3	4	5
Designation	S	N	NA	N	S
Equipment	AC	RS-AC	RS-AC	RS-AC	AC

==== Line 3bis ====
	Formation 6 (VI)		
Car No.	1	2	3
Designation	M	B	M
Equipment	RS-AC	AC	RS-AC

==== Line 10 ====
	Formation 3 (III)				
Car No.	1	2	3	4	5
Designation	S	N	NA	N	S
Equipment	AC	RS-AC	RS-AC	RS-AC	AC

==== Line 12 ====
	Formation 2 (II)				
Car No.	1	2	3	4	5
Designation	M	N	A	B	M
Equipment	RS-AC	RS-AC	AC	AC	RS-AC

=== Former trainset ===
==== Before 1971 ====
During the first few years of operation, the MF 67s (A and C) were "full grip". All cars were motorized to maintain efficient speed and acceleration against the MP 59 (with tires).

The order of cars (not motorized) made it possible to create the MP67 D by withdrawing 2 motor cars and replacing them by two cars. All MF 67Ds were transformed into MF 67A or C.

	Formation 4 (IV)				
Car No.	1	2	3	4	5
Designation	M	N	NA	N	M

==== Line 7Bis ====
Until 1994, with the arrival of the MF 88, line 7bis used MF 67E in a trainset of 4 cars.

These trainsets arrived in 1981–82 from lines 8 and 13 (which received new MF 77), and left from the 7bis line in 1994 for line 10 (which reformed the old MA 51).

	Formation 5 (V)			
Car No.	1	2	3	4
Designation	M	N	A	M
Equipment	RS-AC	RS	RS	AC

Information:

- AC : Air compressor
- RS : Resistor Control
- M : end power car with driver's cab
- N : power car without driver's cab
- S : end car with driver's cab
- NA : power car without driver's cab and with first class (not in use today)
- A : car with first class
- B : car with only second class

== Gallery ==
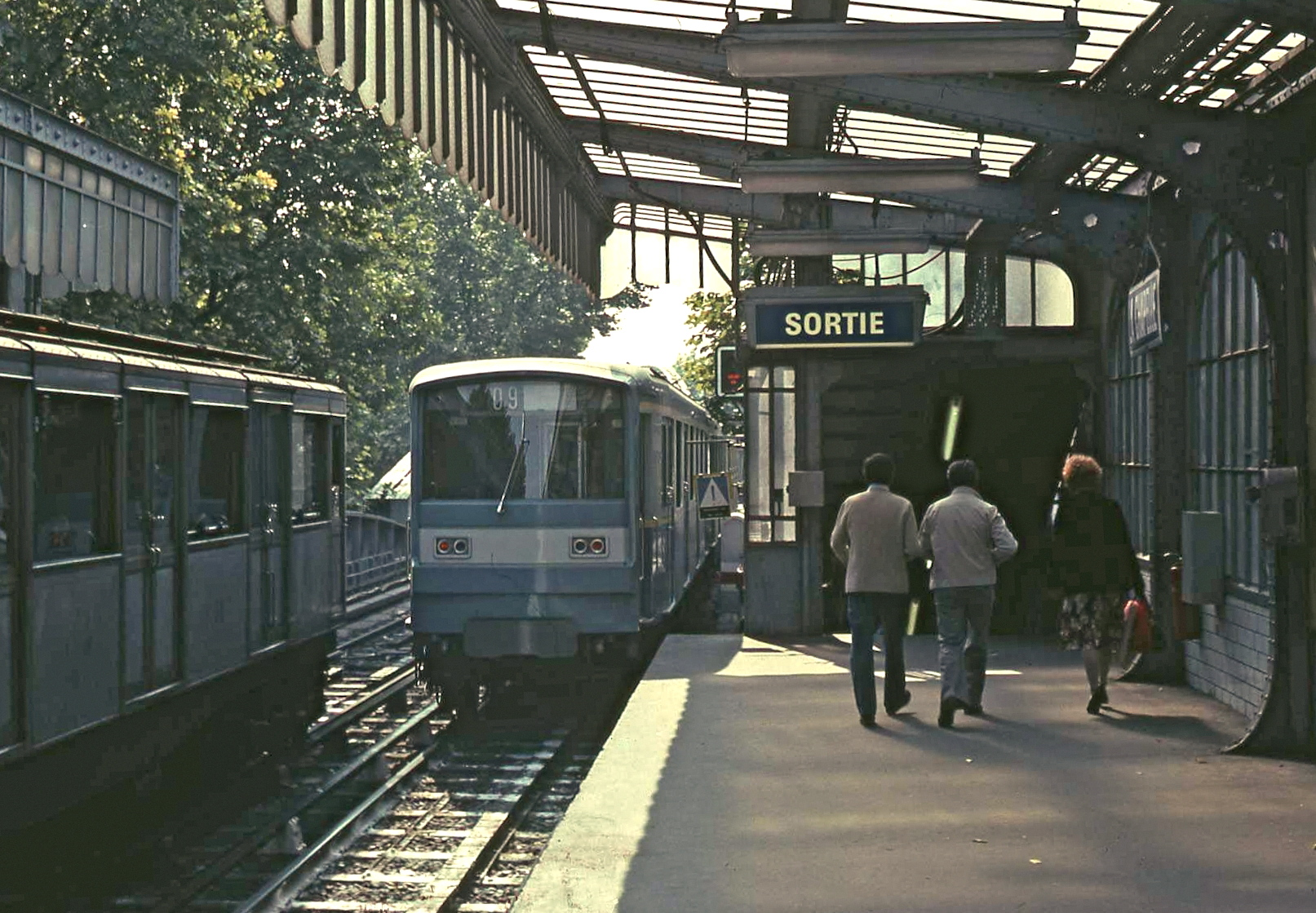
A MF 67D and an old Sprague-Thomson on line 2

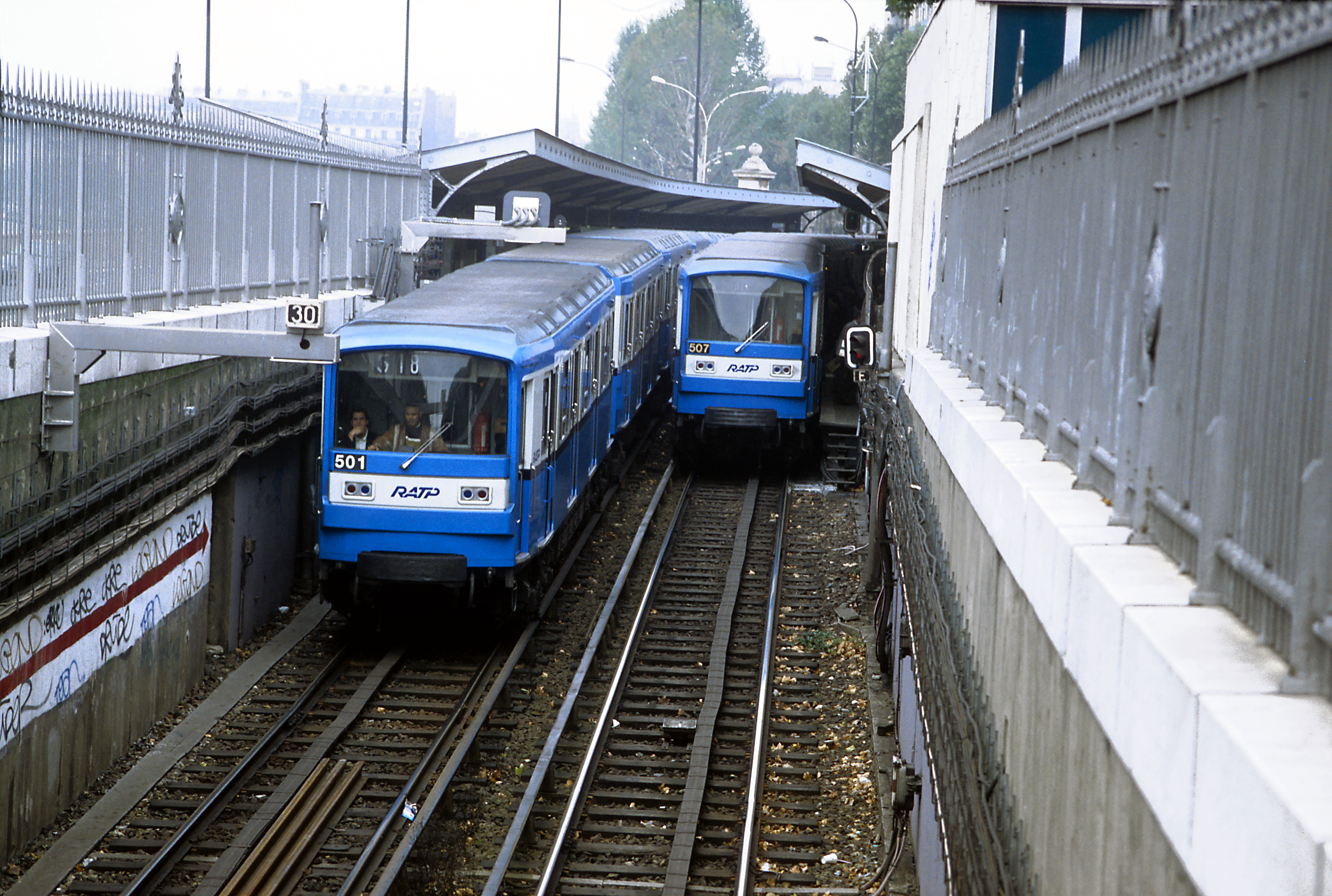
2 MF 67F with old livery on line 5

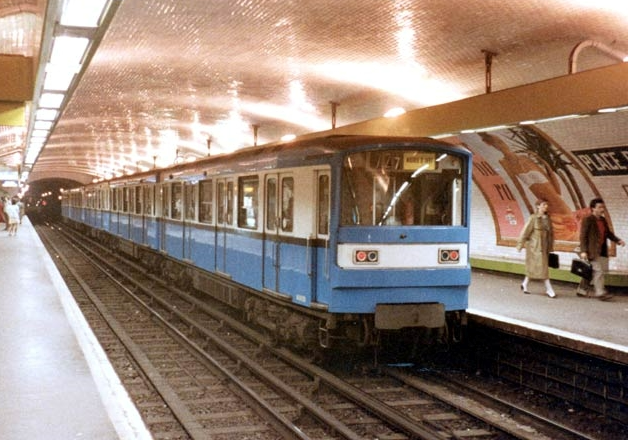
MF 67F on Line 7 in 1983

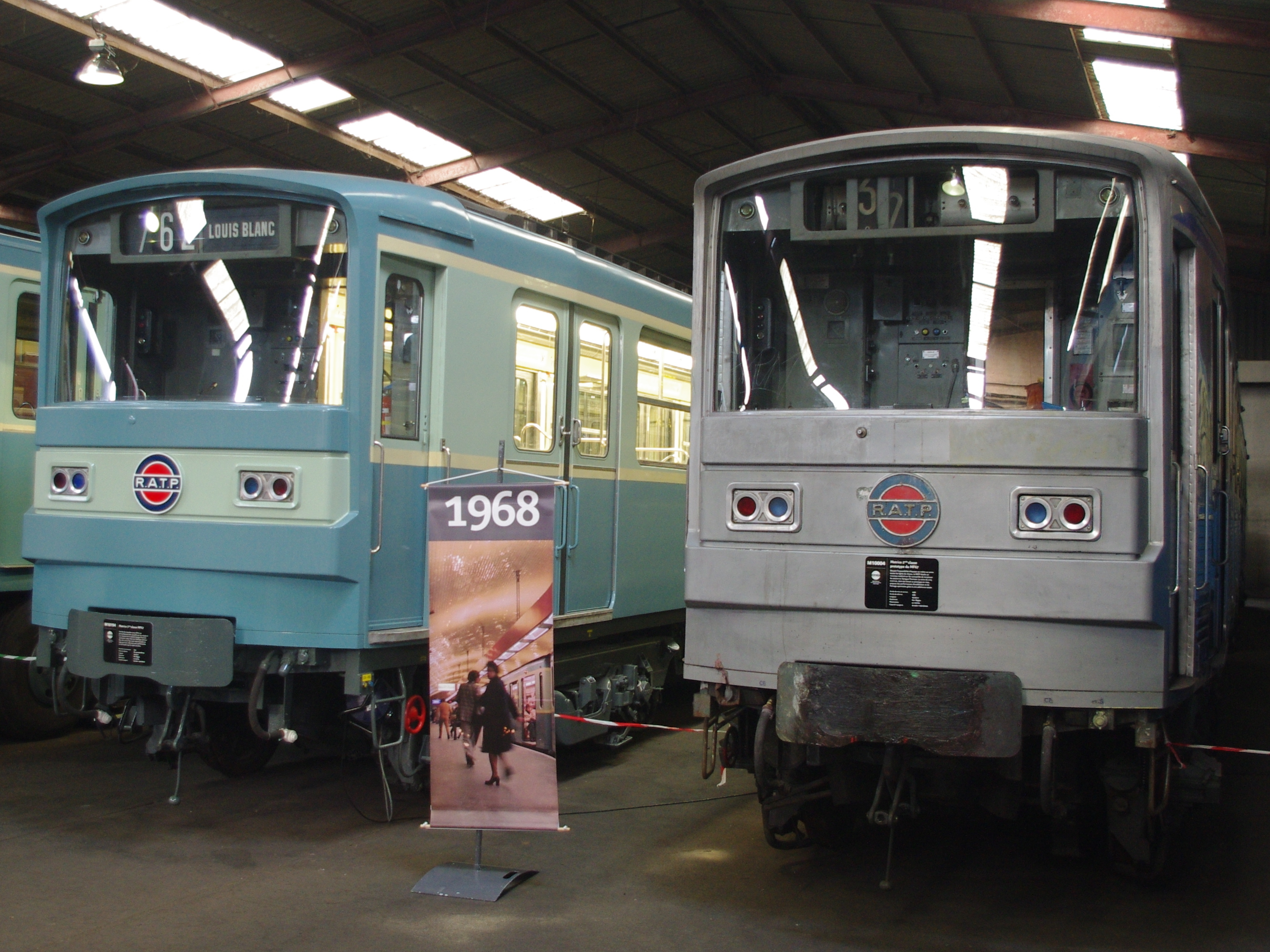
Left MF 67D, right Zebulon at RATP museum

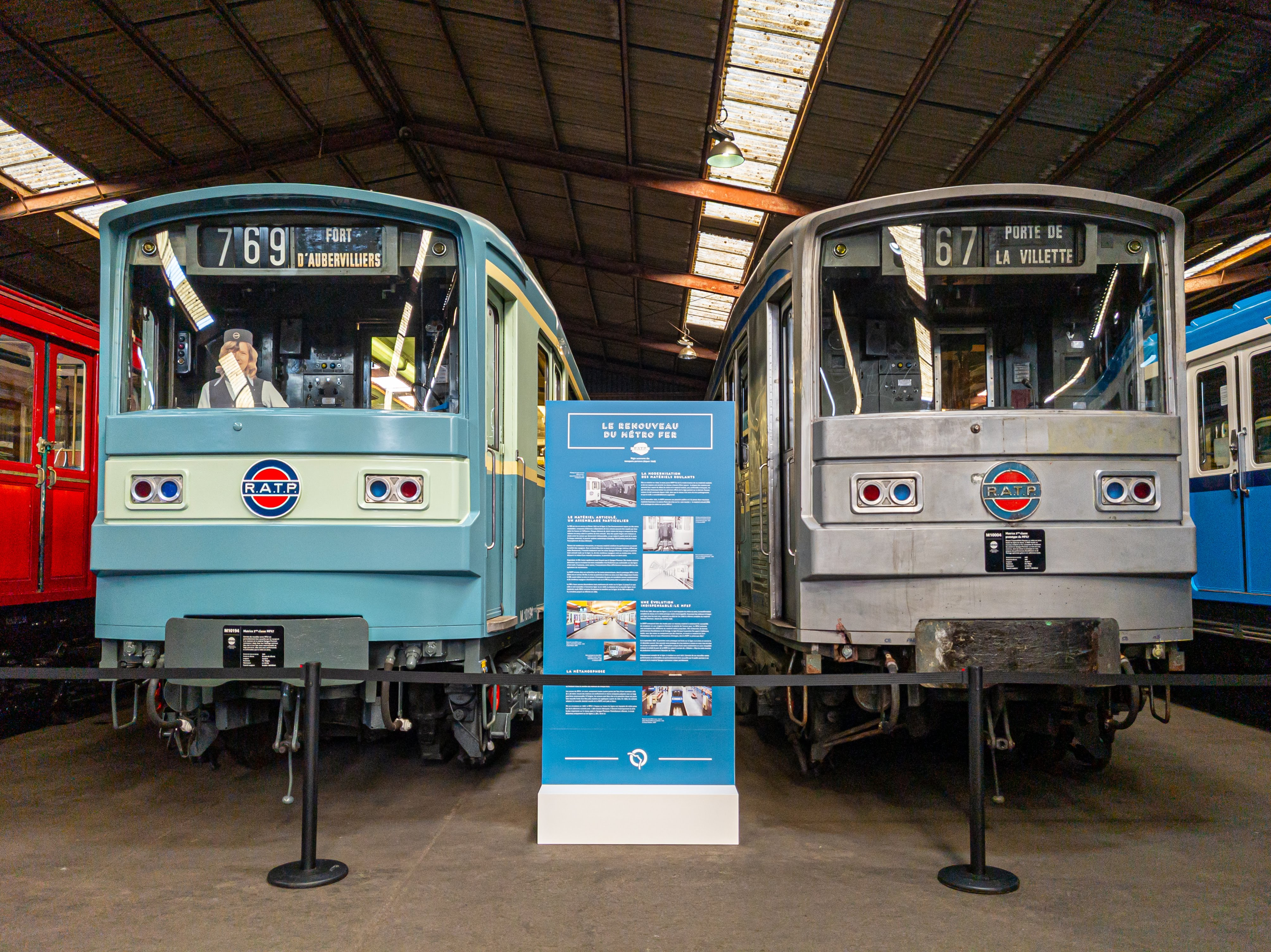
Front view of MF 67D and Zébulon (a Sprague-Thomson can be seen on the left, and on the right a MA 51)

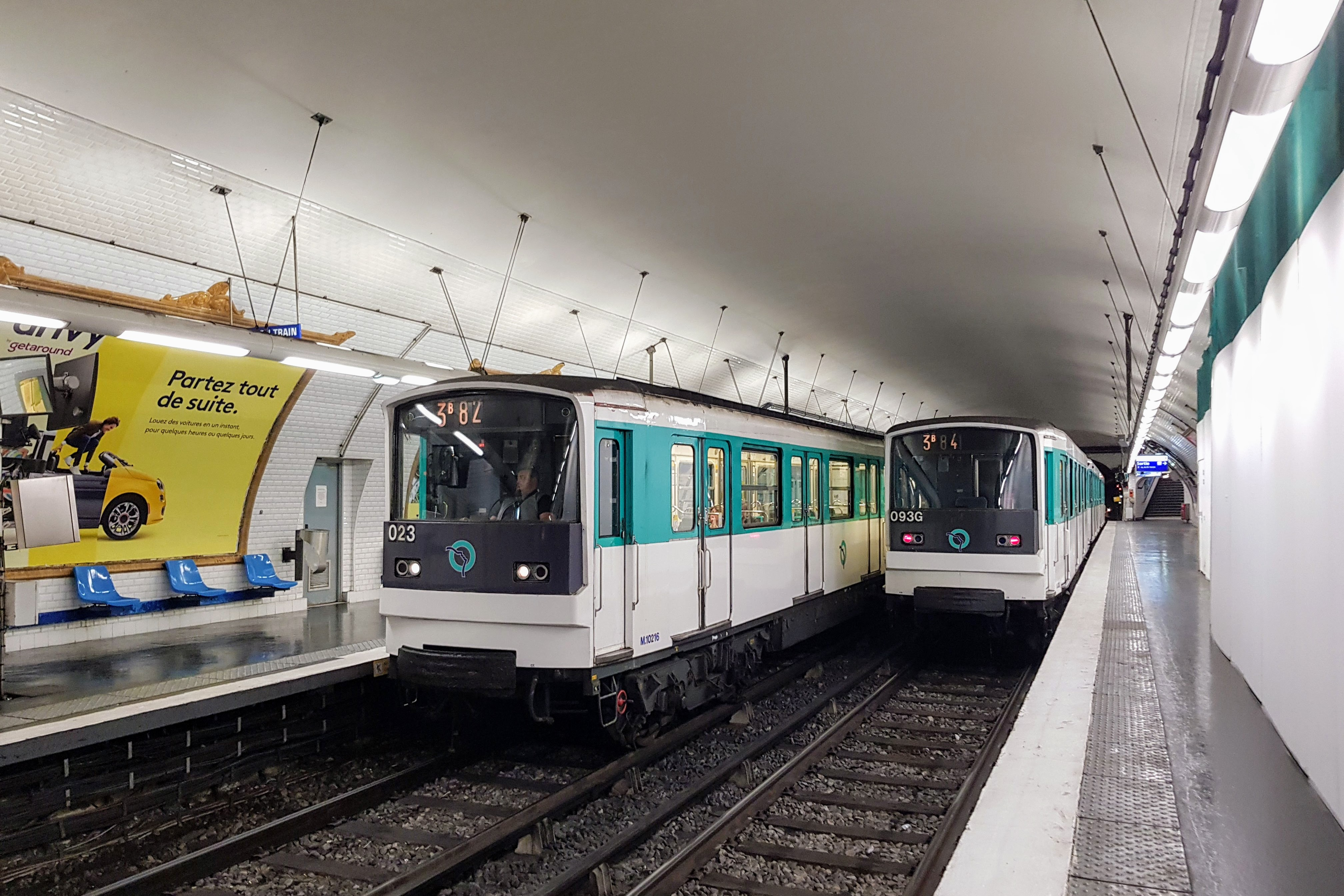
MF 67D at Pte des Lilas on Line 3Bis

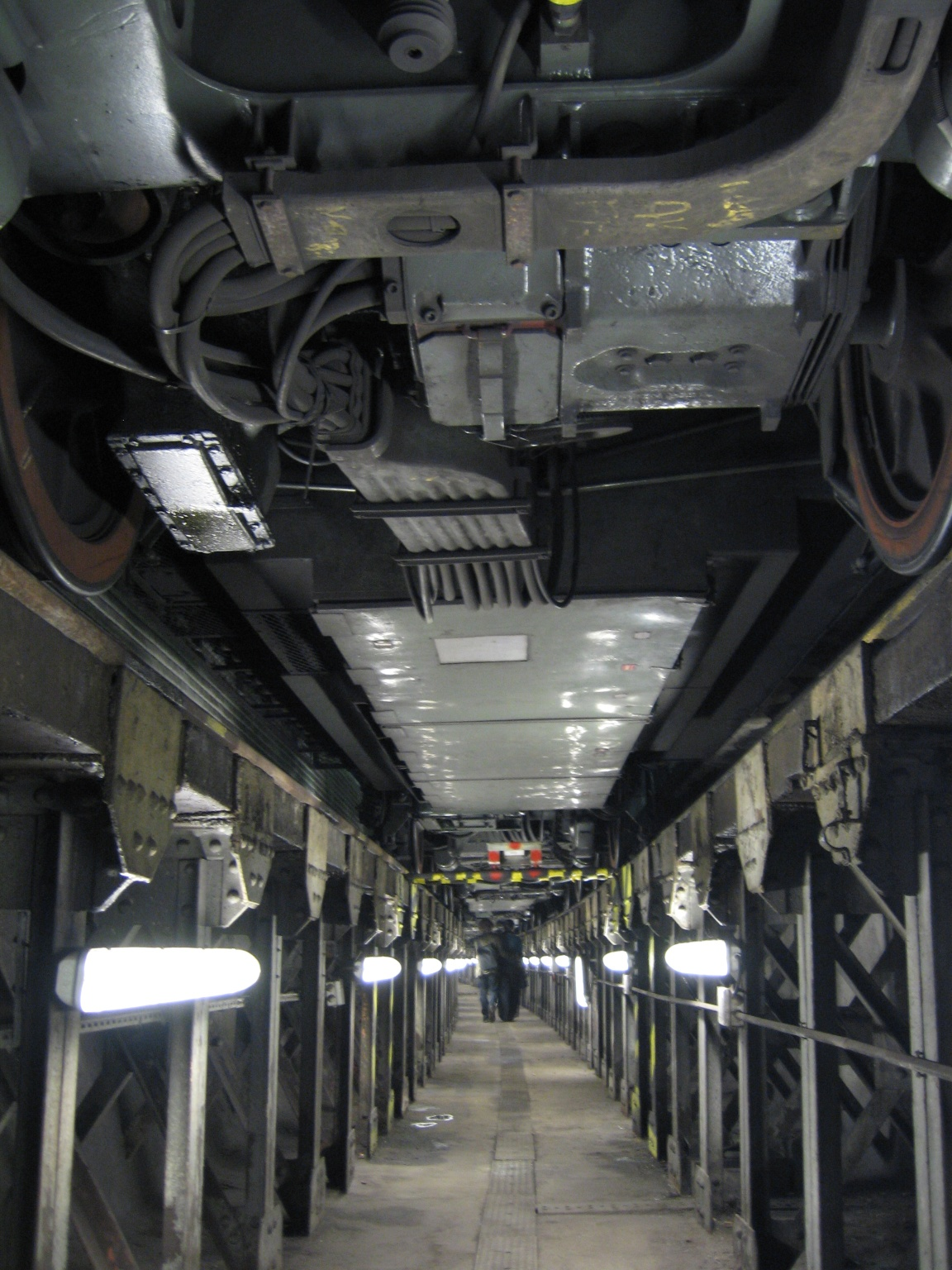
The underside of a MF 67D power car

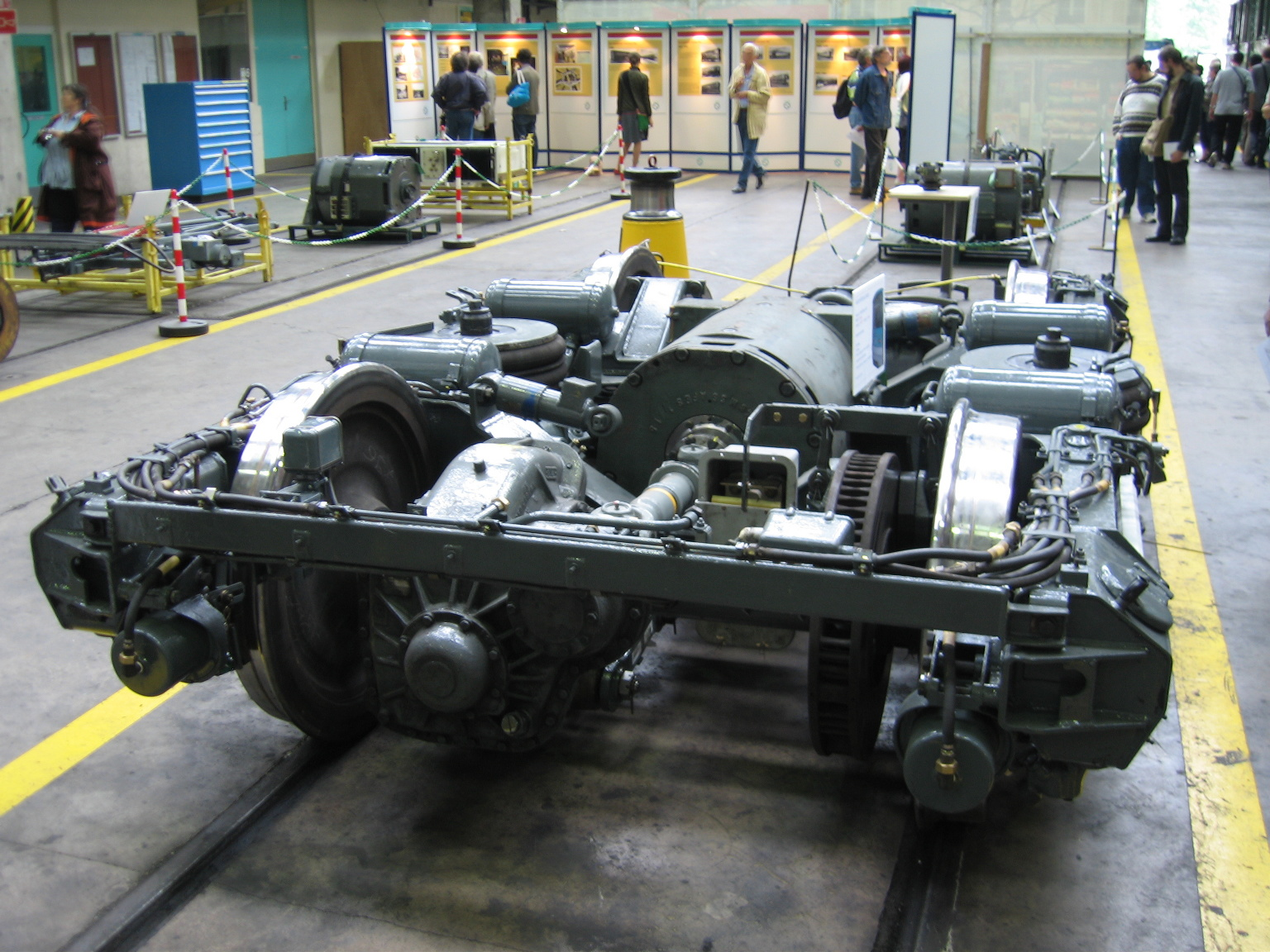
A MF 67F bogie (same as on the MF 77)

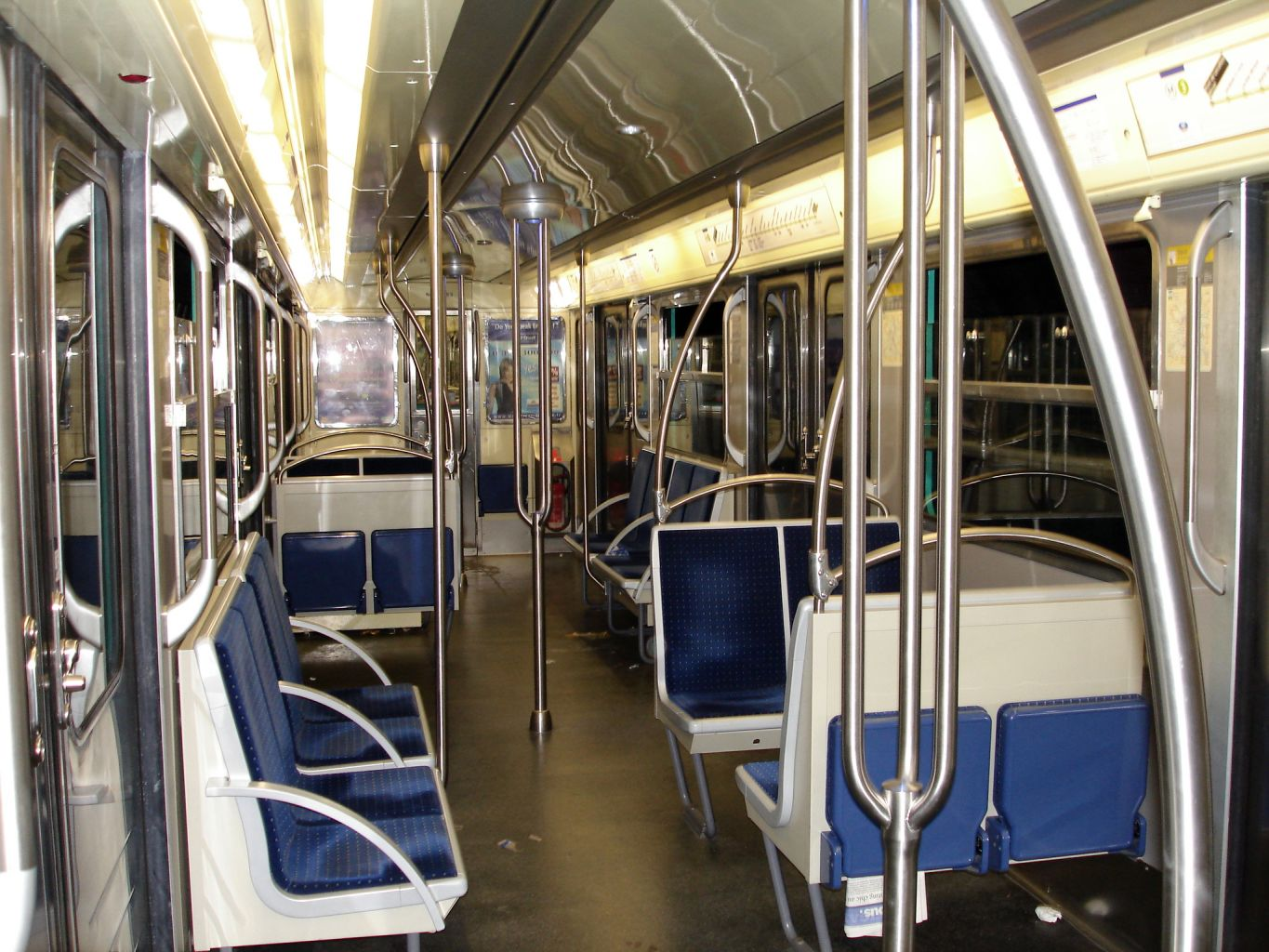
Interior of a renovated MF 67 on Line 3

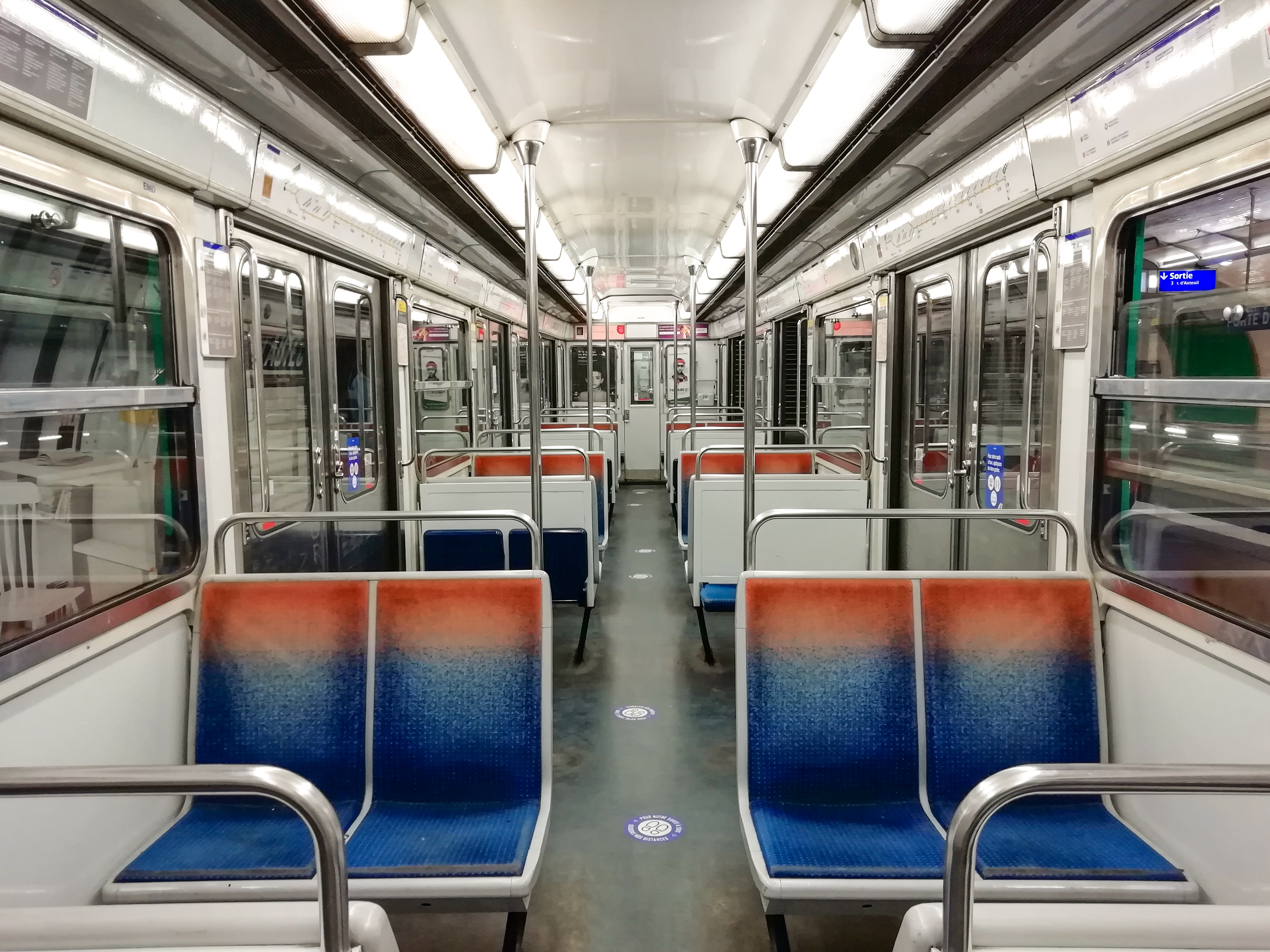
Classic interior of a MF 67

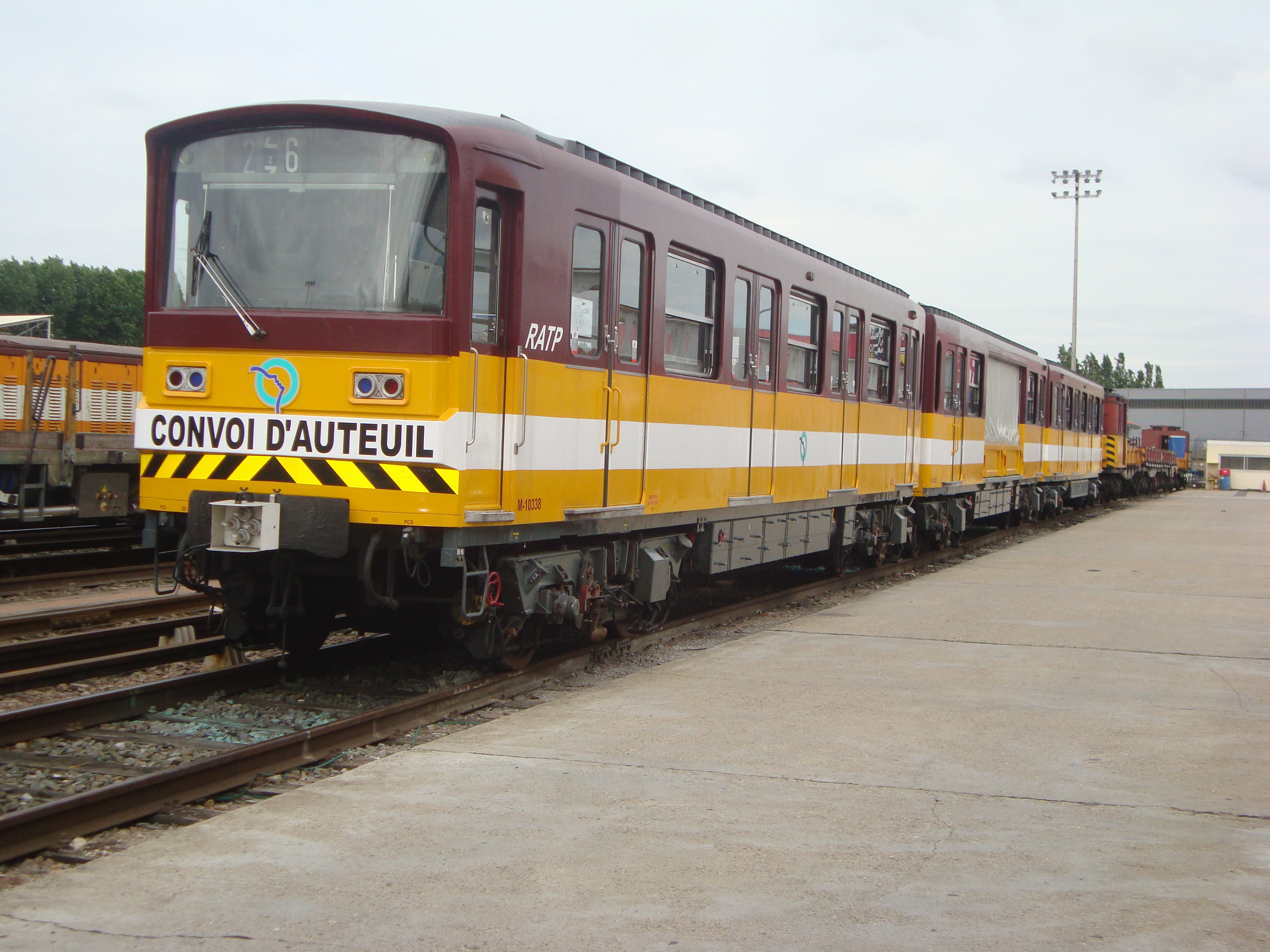
MF 67 service train

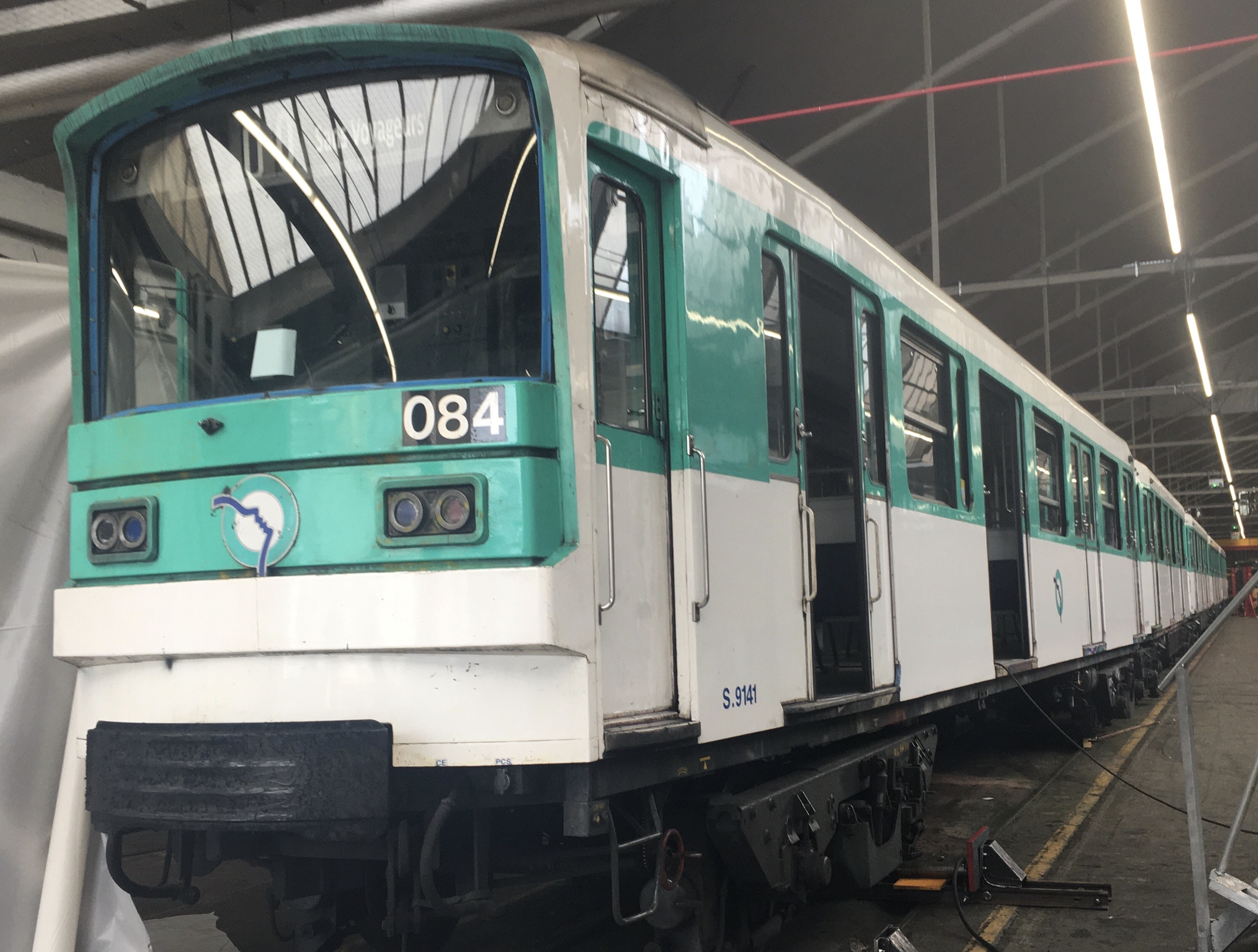
MF 67 at Choisy metro workshops
