= Velvl Greene =

Professor Emeritus Velvl Greene
- זאב גרין
- Born: Velvl (William) Greene; July 5, 1928; Winnipeg, Manitoba, Canada
- Died: November 21, 2011 (aged 83); Beersheba, Israel
- Education: B.S. agriculture, University of Manitoba; M.S. dairy bacteriology, University of Manitoba; PhD, dairy bacteriology, University of Minnesota
- Spouse: Gail Chesler
- Children: 5
- Scientific career
- Fields: Public health, bacteriology, microbiology, exobiology
- Workplaces: University of Minnesota; NASA Planetary Quarantine Division; Ben-Gurion University of the Negev
- Thesis: The Influence of Heat-Induced Chemical Changes in Milk on Lactic Streptocci (1956)

Velvl Greene (Hebrew: זאב גרין; July 5, 1928 – November 21, 2011) was a Canadian–American–Israeli scientist and academic. Specializing in public health and bacteriology, he was a professor of public health and microbiology at the University of Minnesota from 1959 to 1986, teaching over 30,000 students. He developed the first university-level curriculum in environmental microbiology in response to an outbreak of staph infections at American hospitals in the late 1950s. In 1961 he began working for the NASA Planetary Quarantine Division in an exobiology program that sought to determine the presence of microbes in outer space. He immigrated to Israel in 1986, serving as chair of epidemiology and public health and professor emeritus at Ben-Gurion University of the Negev and director of that school's Lord Jacobovitz Center for Jewish Medical Ethics until 2009. Coming from a secular Zionist background, Greene became a baal teshuva and Lubavitcher Hasid in the 1960s. He conducted a three-decade-long correspondence with the Lubavitcher Rebbe discussing the compatibility between Torah teachings and scientific knowledge.

== Early life and education ==
Greene was born in Winnipeg, Manitoba, Canada, on July 5, 1928. His parents were Samuel and Sarah Greene. He had two older sisters. He was given the Yiddish name Velvl after a grandfather, but was officially registered as William. Raised in a secular Zionist home, he attended the I. L. Peretz Folk School, where classes were conducted in Yiddish. As a member of a socialist Zionist youth group in his teens, he legally changed his given name to his Yiddish name, Velvl, to express solidarity with the Jews in Nazi-occupied Warsaw. (Note: He later published under the name Velvl W. Greene.)

Influenced by his Zionist upbringing at home and at school, he chose to study agriculture in order to prepare for aliyah (immigration) to Israel. He earned his undergraduate degree at the University of Manitoba on a Canadian army scholarship. He went on to earn a master's degree in dairy bacteriology at the same school. As a condition for receiving his scholarship, he then entered an officer training program, but quit after less than a year to pursue his doctorate in bacteriology at the University of Minnesota.

== Academic career ==
In 1956, shortly after earning his PhD and marrying, Greene accepted a position as an assistant professor of bacteriology at the Southwestern Louisiana Institute in Lafayette, Louisiana. At the same time, he served as rabbi of that community's 60-member Reform congregation, though his only qualification was his ability to read Hebrew.

In 1957, Louisiana hospitals were hit with a virulent outbreak of staphylococcus that threatened both newborns and surgical patients. Though staph infections had been eradicated through the use of penicillin, the bacteria had become resistant to penicillin. Greene, "the only bacteriologist within a hundred miles", was asked by public health officials to help halt the outbreak. He later said: "I wasn't a physician, but they asked for help so I advocated a return to the old protocols of Semmelweis and Nightingale: wash your hands, wear gowns, isolate patients. It worked, so we published a paper on how we'd handled the crisis".

When the staph outbreak spread northward, the University of Minnesota received a $1 million grant to conduct research on it, and invited Greene to join its faculty as an assistant professor. Greene moved his family back to Minnesota in 1959, and developed the first university-level curriculum in environmental microbiology. He lectured at the university until 1986, teaching more than 30,000 public health students.

== NASA researcher ==
In 1961 Greene was hired by NASA's Planetary Quarantine Division to head an astrobiology project in conjunction with the search for life on Mars. The space scientists were concerned that "extraterrestrial microbes" might adhere to spacecraft and be transported back to earth. Greene led a research team in Minneapolis which collected and analyzed aerosol samples from the Earth's stratosphere. He continued working for NASA on the Apollo and Viking programs.

== Religious observance ==
Living in Minneapolis, the Greenes enrolled their children in a small Torah day school to ensure they received a Jewish education. Greene was inspired to increase his own Jewish knowledge after agreeing to meet the city's newly-appointed Chabad shaliach (emissary) in 1962. The shaliach suddenly interrupted their conversation to pray the afternoon service, which Greene regarded as an insult. But when the rabbi explained that "What I came for was very, very important, but what I had to do now was even more important", Greene was intrigued. Impressed by the shaliach's sincerity and dedication, he agreed to study with him and slowly took on more religious observance.

When Greene began asking questions about how religious Jews reconcile the theory of evolution with the Genesis creation narrative, the shaliach introduced him to the Lubavitcher Rebbe, Rabbi Menachem Mendel Schneerson, who had studied science and mathematics at the university level in Berlin and Paris. Greene began a scientific and personal correspondence with the Rebbe that lasted from 1963 until the Rebbe's death in 1994. The Rebbe expressed interest in seeing all of Greene's scientific papers and would critique them. Eventually the Rebbe clarified all of Greene's doubts about the evolution vs. Creation debate.

"Is this right?" Greene asked the Rebbe. "Can I really do this? Other religions say you shouldn't search. And the Torah doesn't say there's life on Mars."

"Professor Greene", the Rebbe replied, "you should look for life on Mars. And if you don't find it there, you should look elsewhere. And if you don't find it there, you should look elsewhere. Because for you to sit here and say that God didn't create life elsewhere is to put limits on God, and no one can do that".

— conversation between Velvl Greene and the Lubavitcher Rebbe

Greene laid tefillin for the first time in 1966 after receiving a pair as a gift from the Rebbe. With the encouragement of his wife, who wanted a kosher home, Greene slowly became a kippah-wearing, Shabbat-observant Jew. He later served as an emissary for the Rebbe, smuggling in books and religious objects to Jews in the Soviet Union. His transformation from a secular Jewish professor to a Lubavitcher Hasid became part of Chabad lore. In 2017, the Tzeirei Hashluchim produced an animation of Greene's first meeting with the Chabad shaliach for the purpose of instructing youngsters in shlichus work.

== Move to Israel ==
Greene taught at Ben-Gurion University of the Negev on two sabbaticals, in 1977 and 1984. In 1986, he and his wife immigrated to Israel, where he accepted a professorship in public health and epidemiology at the university and also served as director of the school's new Jewish medical ethics program. The latter position saw him participate in a 1989 conference organized by bioethicist Arthur Caplan, which was the first to discuss the ethics of using data from Nazi human experimentation in modern-day scientific research.

Greene lectured around the world on the compatibility between Torah teachings and scientific knowledge, and had a morning talk show program on public television. He retired from Ben-Gurion University of the Negev in 2009.

== Honors ==
In 1983 Greene received a Bush Foundation fellowship and was named a Senior Fulbright Lecturer by the Council for International Exchange of Scholars.

== Personal life ==
Greene met his wife, Gail Chesler, a music student at the University of Minnesota, in 1955; they married a year later. The couple had two sons and three daughters. Both their sons became Chabad shluchim in the United States.

Greene died on November 21, 2011, aged 83. His sons edited and published his autobiography, Curiosity and the Desire for Truth: The spiritual journey of a NASA scientist, in 2015.

== Selected bibliography ==
=== Books ===
- Greene, Dr. Velvl (2015). Curiosity and the Desire for Truth: The spiritual journey of a NASA scientist. Arthur Kurzweil. ISBN 978-0985565879.

=== Chapters ===
- Greene, Velvl W. (2012), "Can Scientists Use Information Derived from the Concentration Camps?", in Caplan, Arthur L. (ed.), When Medicine Went Mad: Bioethics and the Holocaust, Springer Science & Business Media, p. 155, ISBN 978-1461204138

=== Papers ===
- Greene, Velvl W. (August 2001). "Personal hygiene and life expectancy improvements since 1850: Historic and epidemiologic associations". American Journal of Infection Control. 29 (4): 203–206. doi:10.1067/mic.2001.115686. PMID 11486254.
- Fraser, Drora; et al. (November 1997). "Natural History of Giardia lamblia and Cryptosporidium Infections in a Cohort of Israeli Bedouin Infants: A Study of a Population in Transition". The American Journal of Tropical Medicine and Hygiene. 57 (5): 544–549. doi:10.4269/ajtmh.1997.57.544. PMID 9392593.
- Leibovici, A.; Lavi, N.; Wainstok, S.; Herman, J.; Greene, V. W. (January 1995). "Low-dose acetylsalicylic acid use and hemoglobin levels: Effects in a primary care population". Canadian Family Physician. 41: 64–68. PMC 2145980. PMID 7894282.
- Klapes, N. Ariene; Greene, Velvl W.; Langholz, Ann C.; Hunstiger, Cindy (July 1987). "Effect of Long-term Storage on Sterile Status of Devices in Surgical Packs". Infection Control & Hospital Epidemiology. 8 (7): 289–293. doi:10.1017/S0195941700066261. PMID 3650206. S2CID 41031761.
- Crow, Sue; Greene, Velvl William (1982). "Aseptic Transgressions Among Surgeons and Anesthesiologists: A qualitative study". Archives of Surgery. 117 (8): 1012–1016. doi:10.1001/archsurg.1982.01380320008003. PMID 7103717.
- Greene, Velvl W. (1968). "Automatic Biodetecting and Monitoring Instruments Open Doors for Environmental Understanding". Environmental Science & Technology. 2 (2): 104–112. doi:10.1021/es60014a602.
