= Ze'evi =

Ze'evi is a surname. Notable people with the surname include:

- Ariel Ze'evi (born 1977), Israeli judoka
- Dror Ze'evi (born 1953), Israeli historian
- Rehavam Ze'evi (1926–2001), Israeli general, politician, and historian

== See also ==
- Ze'ev
