= Zev Wolf of Zhitomyr =

Ukrainian rabbi from Zhitomyr

Zev Wolf of Zhitomyr (died 1798) was a Hassidic Rabbi. He studied under, and has been styled as a disciple of, Dov Ber of Mezeritch, also known as the "Maggid of Mesritch".

== Works ==
- Or HaMeir. (Note: The title is variously presented in English as Or HaMeir, Or Hameir, or Or ha-Meir.) Chassidut in the order of the weekly Torah portions and the festivals. Poritsk, 1815.

== See also ==
- Zev Wolf (disambiguation page)
