= Ze'ev Wolf Buchner =

Ze'ev Wolf ben David ha-Kohen Buchner (Hebrew: זאב וואלף בן דוד הכהן בוכנר; 1750–1820), also known as the Razbad (Hebrew: רזב״ד), was a Galician Hebrew-language grammarian and poet, considered a forerunner of the Haskalah movement.

Though he lived most of his life in Brody, he traveled with Hebrew books through Germany, Galicia, Poland, and Lithuania, at times earning his livelihood by writing letters for illiterate people. His own publications were another source of income to him. He corresponded with Baruch Jeiteles, Jacob Landau, son of Yechezkel Landau, and Beer Ginzburg, the Galician poet and friend of Nachman Krochmal. He suffered very much in his travels through foreign countries, and in Berlin he sustained an injury which cost him the sight of his right eye.

== Work ==
His works include Zeved ha-Melitzah (1774), an imitation of Yehuda Alharizi's Takhemoni; Zeved Tov (1794), a collection of poems; Keter Malkhut (Lemberg, 1794), a hymn in the style of Ibn Gabirol's work of the same name; Shire Tehillah (Berlin, 1797), hymns and parodies; and Tzaḥut ha-Melitzah (Prague, 1805), a collection of his private letters. The Shir Nifla (Frankfurt an der Oder, 1802) and Shir Yedidut (Frankfurt an der Oder, 1810) are partial reprints from the Shire Tehillah. His parodies of the marriage and betrothal contracts were later abridged and published separately as Seder Tenaim Rishonim me-Ḥag ha-Pesaḥ (Lemberg, 1878), and wrongly ascribed to Israel Najara.

About his poetry the Jewish Encyclopedia writes:

Buchner is one of the modern representatives of the medieval school of artificial poetry. His prose is flowery and full of conceits; while his poetry devotes more attention to the number of letters in the words than to the sense which the words are supposed to convey. He endeavored to imitate Gabirol, Al-Ḥarizi, and Bedersi; but he had not the depth of the first, the invention of the second, or the force of expression of the third. He showed a predilection for similitudes (משל); but his arguments are generally encumbered rather than strengthened by these. Though his works had considerable vogue in his day, and went through several editions, they have fallen into oblivion.

== See also ==
- Zev Wolf (disambiguation page)
