= Zev Wolf =

Zev Wolf or Ze'ev Wolf (Yiddish: זאב־וואָלף) is a bilingual pleonasmic Jewish name doublet. "Ze'ev" (Hebrew: זאב, romanized: zeév) means "wolf", and "Wolf" has the same meaning in Yiddish and German. Notable people with the name include:

- Zev Wolf of Zbaraz (died 1822), Hasidic rabbi
- Zev Wolf of Zhitomyr (died 1798), Hasidic rabbi
- Zev Wolf Buchner (1750–1820), Hebrew-language grammarian and poet
- Zev Wolf Gold (1889–1956), rabbi and Jewish activist
- Zev Wolf Kitzes (born c. 1685, died between 1764 and 1775), Hasidic rabbi
- Zev Wolf Mendlin (1842–1912), Russian economist
