= Benjamin Wolf Prerau =

Moravian rabbi and writer

Benjamin Ze'ev Wolf ben Solomon of Prerau (Hebrew: בִּנְיָמִין זְאֵב וואָלף בֵּן שְׁלֹמֹה מִפְּרֵערוֹי, Binyamin Ze'ev Volf ben Shlomo mi-Preroi; fl. 18th–19th centuries) was a Moravian rabbi and writer.

Prerau published Jedaiah ben Abraham Bedersi's Bakashat ha-Memin, to which he added a Yiddish translation, a Hebrew commentary, and an introduction in which each word, as in the work itself, begins with the letter mem (Brünn, 1799). He was also the author of Sefer Ben Yemini, a supercommentary on Ibn Ezra's commentary on the Torah (Vienna, 1823). The book is introduced by haskamot from Rabbis Moses Sofer and Mordecai Benet, among others, the latter of whom describes how at the age of seventy Wolf wandered from village to village in Moravia collecting money to cover the expenses of publishing the work.
