= Zeb =

Zeb may refer to:

- Zeb (name), a list of people with the given name, nickname or surname
- Drummie Zeb, born Angus Gaye in 1959, drummer, producer and lead singer of UK band Aswad
- Garazeb "Zeb" Orrelios, a main character in Star Wars Rebels
- Zeb Jones, a character in the novella If This Goes On— by Robert A. Heinlein
- Zebulon "Zeb" Walton, family patriarch on the American TV series The Waltons
- Zeb, a character in the novel Dorothy and the Wizard in Oz by L. Frank Baum
- Typhoon Zeb, a powerful Category 5 typhoon that struck Luzon in the Philippines in 1998
- Zeb, Oklahoma, United States, an unincorporated community and census-designated place
- Zero-Energy Building, a building with net zero energy consumption

== See also ==
- Zeeb, a Midianite prince in the Bible
