= Ze'ev Ronai =

Israeli-American cancer research scientist

Ze’ev Ronai
- זאב רונאי
- Education: Hebrew University of Jerusalem
- Awards: Received Lifetime Achievement Award from the Society for Melanoma Research (2016)
- Scientific career
- Workplaces: Cedars Sinai Medical Center
- Website: www.ronailab.net

Ze’ev Ronai (Hebrew: זאב רונאי) is an Israeli-American cancer research scientist and Director of the Institute for Translational Research at Cedars Sinai Medical Center in Los Angeles, US.

== Education ==
Ze’ev Ronai was born in Haifa in 1956. He attended Hugim High School in Haifa, and received his B.S. (Biology) and Ph.D. (Immunology) from the Hebrew University of Jerusalem.

== Research ==
Ronai's studies provide new fundamental understanding for the role and function of epigenetic components (transcription factor and ubiquitin ligases) in cancer. Early in his career he developed a sensitive PCR approach to detect mutant Ras oncogene in normal appearing tissues.

Later on, his studies provided the foundation for the rewired signaling in cancer, by demonstrating the important role of protein subcellular localization in its oncogenic function and by establishing the function of ubiquitin ligases in key cellular processes (i.e. hypoxia, unfolded protein response, mitochondrial dynamics, anti-tumor immunity) and their critical contribution to development, progression, and therapy resistance of prostate and breast cancers and melanoma. He developed SBI-756, a small molecule inhibitor, which targets the translation initiation complex, inhibiting melanoma and lymphoid tumors. Ze’ev Ronai published close to 300 peer-reviewed publications, reflected in over 20,000 citations.

Following post doctoral training with I.B. Weinstein at Columbia University, Ronai began his independent career on the campus of the New York Medical College, followed by tenure at Mount Sinai School of Medicine in NY. He joined Sanford Burnham Prebys Medical Discovery Institute in 2004 where he served as Program Director, Scientific Director, Deputy and later the Director of the NCI designated basic cancer center. In 2024 he relocated to Cedars Sinai in LA, where he establishes the Institute for Translational Research.

In Israel, he has established the Technion Integrated Cancer Center, (with the Nobel Laureate Aaron Ciechanover), first in class where engineers biologists and oncologists collaborate to defeat cancer.

== Awards and honors ==
Ronai received the Lifetime Achievement Award from the Society for Melanoma Research (2016). Earlier, he obtained the Golda Meir Fellowship from the Hebrew University. He also served as editor in chief of Pigment Cell & Melanoma Research.

== Patents ==
Ronai obtained a number patents for his inventions; those include a "Quantitative method for early detection of mutant alleles and diagnostic kits for carrying out the method" (1996), "Inhibition of ATF2 activity to treat cancer" (2011), and "Compositions and methods for inhibiting growth and metastasis of melanoma" (2011).

== Publications (>300, with >33,000 citations) ==
- Kahn, S.M., Jiang, W., Culbertson, T.A., Weinstein, I.B. Williams, G.M., Ronai, Z. Rapid and sensitive nonradioactive detection of mutant K-ras genes via ‘enriched’ PCR amplification. Oncogene. 6(6):1079-83, 1991.
- Tobi, M., Luo, F.C., Ronai, Z. Detection of K-ras mutation in colonic effluent samples from patients without evidence for colorectal carcinoma. J Natl Cancer Inst. 86(13):1007-10, 1994.
- Fuchs, S.Y., Dolan, L.R., Davis, R., Ronai, Z. Phosphorylation dependent targeting of c-Jun ubiquitination by Jun N-kinase. Oncogene. 13(7):1531-5, 1996.
- Adler, V., Yin, Z., Fuchs, S.Y., Benezra, M., Rosario, L., Tew, K.D., Pincus, M.R., Sardana, M., Henderson, C.J., Wolf, C.R., Davis, R. Ronai, Z. Regulation of JNK signaling by GSTp. EMBO J. 18:1321-34, 1999.
- Habelhah, H., Shah, K., Hunag, L., Ostareck-Lederer. A., Burlingame, A.L., Shokat, K.M., Hentze, M.W., Ronai, Z. ERK phosphorylation drives cytoplasmic accumulation of hnRNP-K and inhibition of mRNA translation. Nat Cell Biol. 3(3):325-30, 2001.
- Bhoumik, A., Jones, N., Ronai, Z. Transcriptional switch by activating transcription factor 2-derived peptide sensitizes melanoma cells to apoptosis and inhibits their tumorigenicity. Proc Natl Acad Sci U S A. 101(12):4222-7, 2004.
- Nakayama, K., Frew, I.J., Hagensen, M., Skals, M., Habelhah, H., Bhoumik, A., Kadoya, T., Erdjument-Bromage, H., Tempst, P., Frappell, P.B., Bowtell, D.D., Ronai, Z. Siah2 regulates stability of prolyl-hydroxylases, controls HIF1alpha abundance, and modulates physiological responses to hypoxia. Cell. 117(7):941-52, 2004.

== Personal life ==
Ze’ev Ronai is married to Iris Ronai (1980); they have three children.
