= Zébulon (Paris Metro) =

Prototype rolling stock

Zébulon (MF 67)
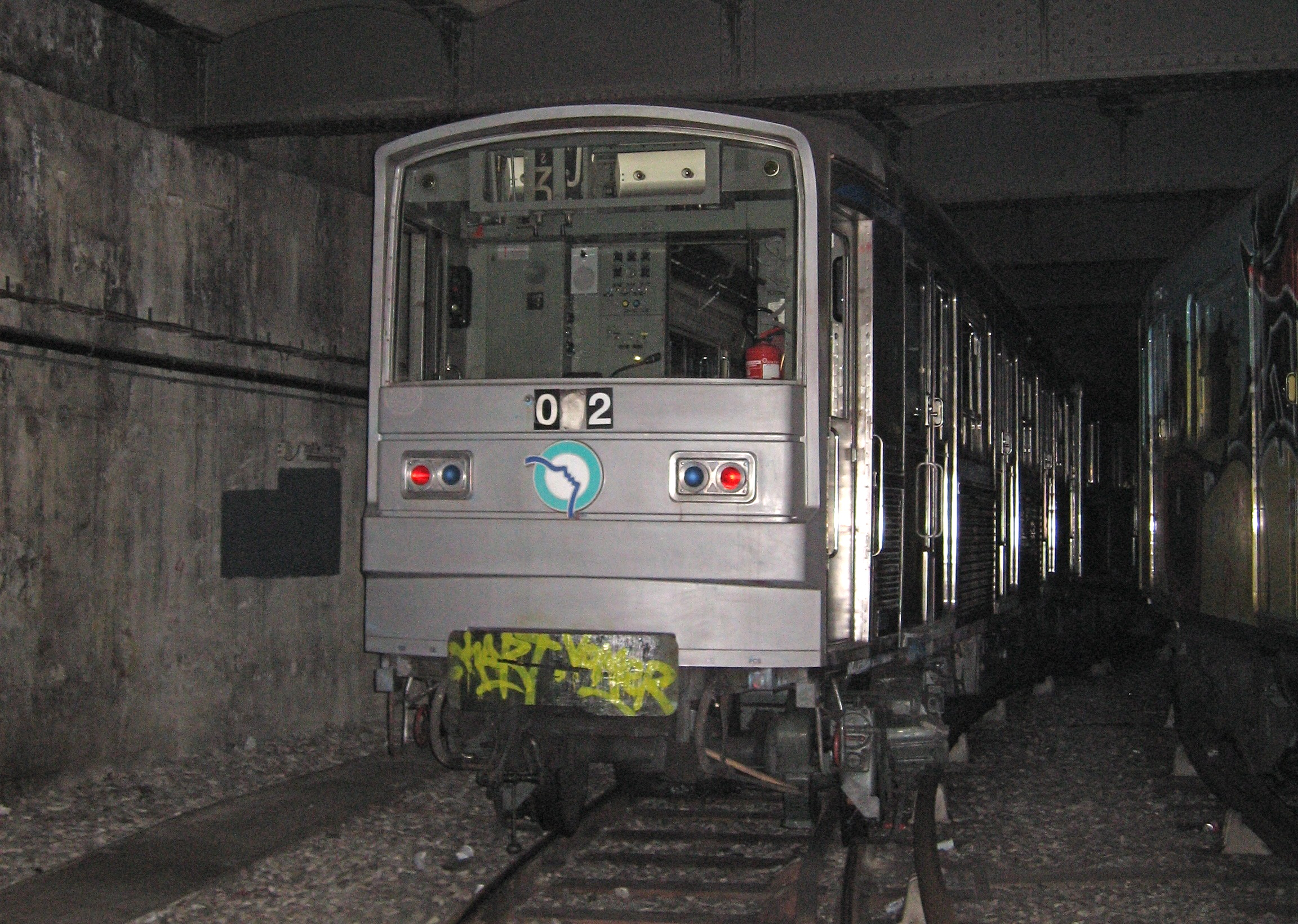
- The Zébulon at the RATP training centre, Gare du Nord USFRT
- In service: Retired
- Manufacturers: Brissonneau and Lotz and CIMT
- Number built: 6 cars
- Formation: 5 car composition (6th car unused)
- Operator: RATP
- Lines served: Used for training purposes; briefly served on lines 3, 7, and 9

Specifications
- Car length: Motor car: 15,145 mm (49 ft 8.3 in); Trailer 14,390 mm (47 ft 2.5 in)
- Width: 2,400 mm (7 ft 10.49 in)
- Maximum speed: 80 km/h (50 mph) (Design); 70 km/h (43 mph) (Service)
- Power output: 1,272 kW (1,706 hp) (Twin-motor); 1,080 kW (1,448 hp) (Single-motor bogies)
- Electric system: 750 V DC Third rail
- Current collection: Contact shoe
- Track gauge: 1,435 mm (4 ft 8 1/2 in)

The MF67 W2 prototype or the Zébulon, was the second prototype of the MF 67 class of rolling stock used on the Paris Metro, and was finished in stainless steel. It was delivered to the RATP in May 1968.

== Specifications ==
The RATP used the Zébulon, which gained its nickname from the fact that it was stainless steel, primarily for training purposes. It was also intermittently utilized for passenger service, the last on Line 9. The use of unpainted stainless steel and aluminum saved about 700kg of weight per car. The design of the Zébulon resembled that of the MF 67 A-series, but the stainless steel design of the train made it very difficult for the RATP to maintain, and was extremely susceptible to vandalism. This train also had higher production costs than other MF 67 trains. These reasons eventually led to the train's limited use and lack of further orders.

The Zébulon was composed of five motor cars, although there was a sixth (trailer) car that was unused. The composition consisted of M.10003 + N.11003 + NA.12002 + N.11004 + M.10004. The train was also equipped with twin bogies.

== History ==
Although the Zébulon spent most of its time (roughly 30 years) at the RATP training centre, it briefly circulated on Lines 3, 7, and 9. In 2010, the train succumbed to heavy vandalism and was deemed to be beyond repair. The RATP scrapped the train in 2011, with the exception of one motor car, M.10004, which is preserved with M.10194 at the RATP heritage depot, Villeneuve-Saint-Georges. The training centre is now equipped with seven MF 67 E cars from Line 2.

== Gallery ==
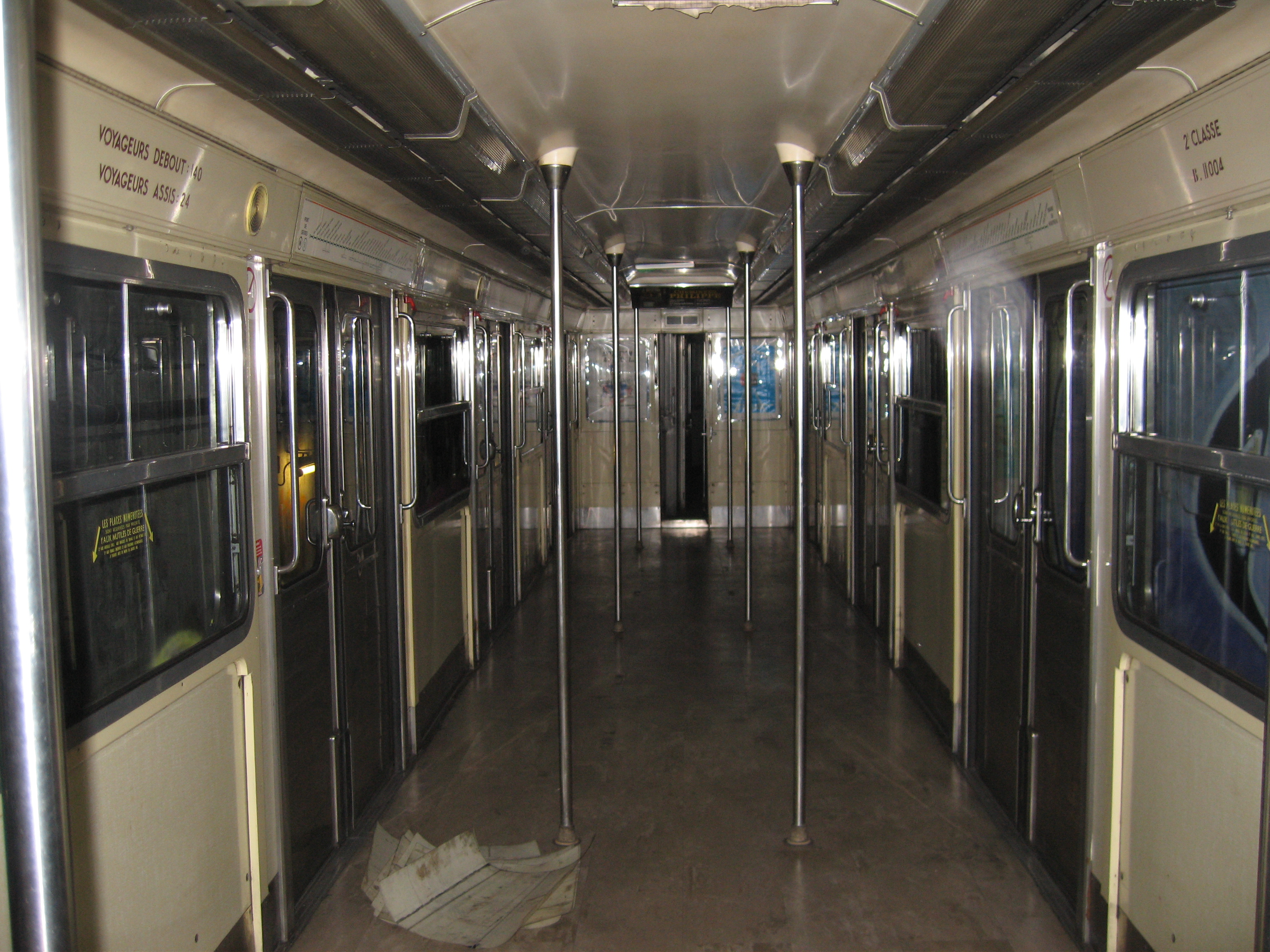
Inside the Zébulon, in 2006.

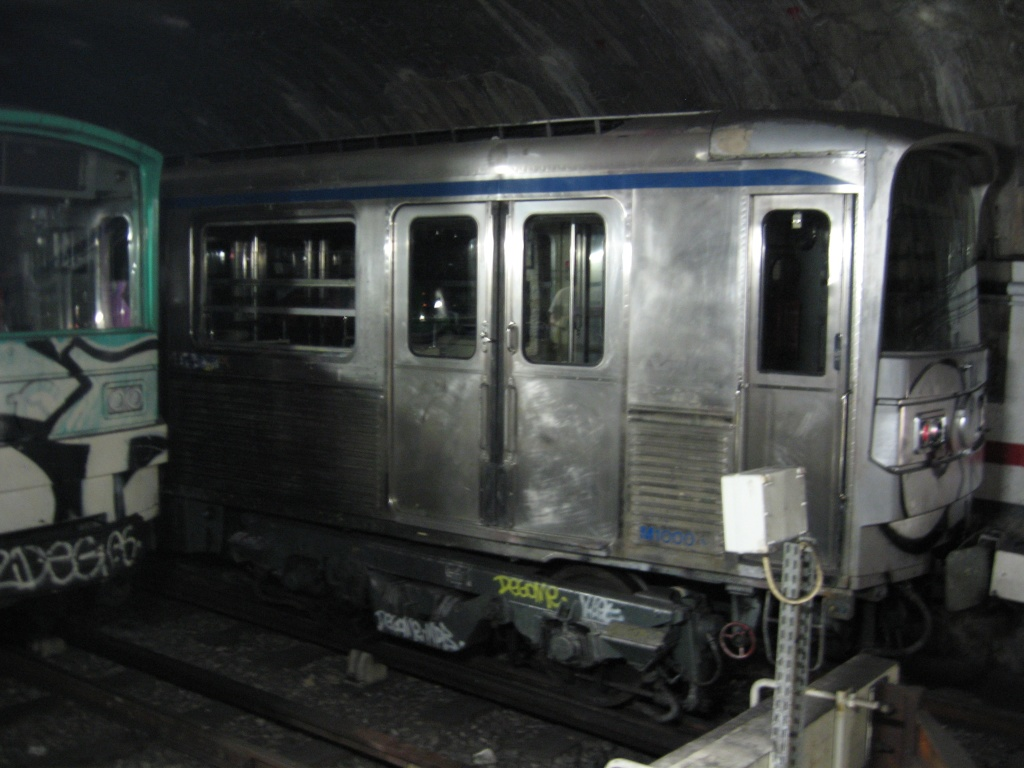
Zébulon motor car M.10004.

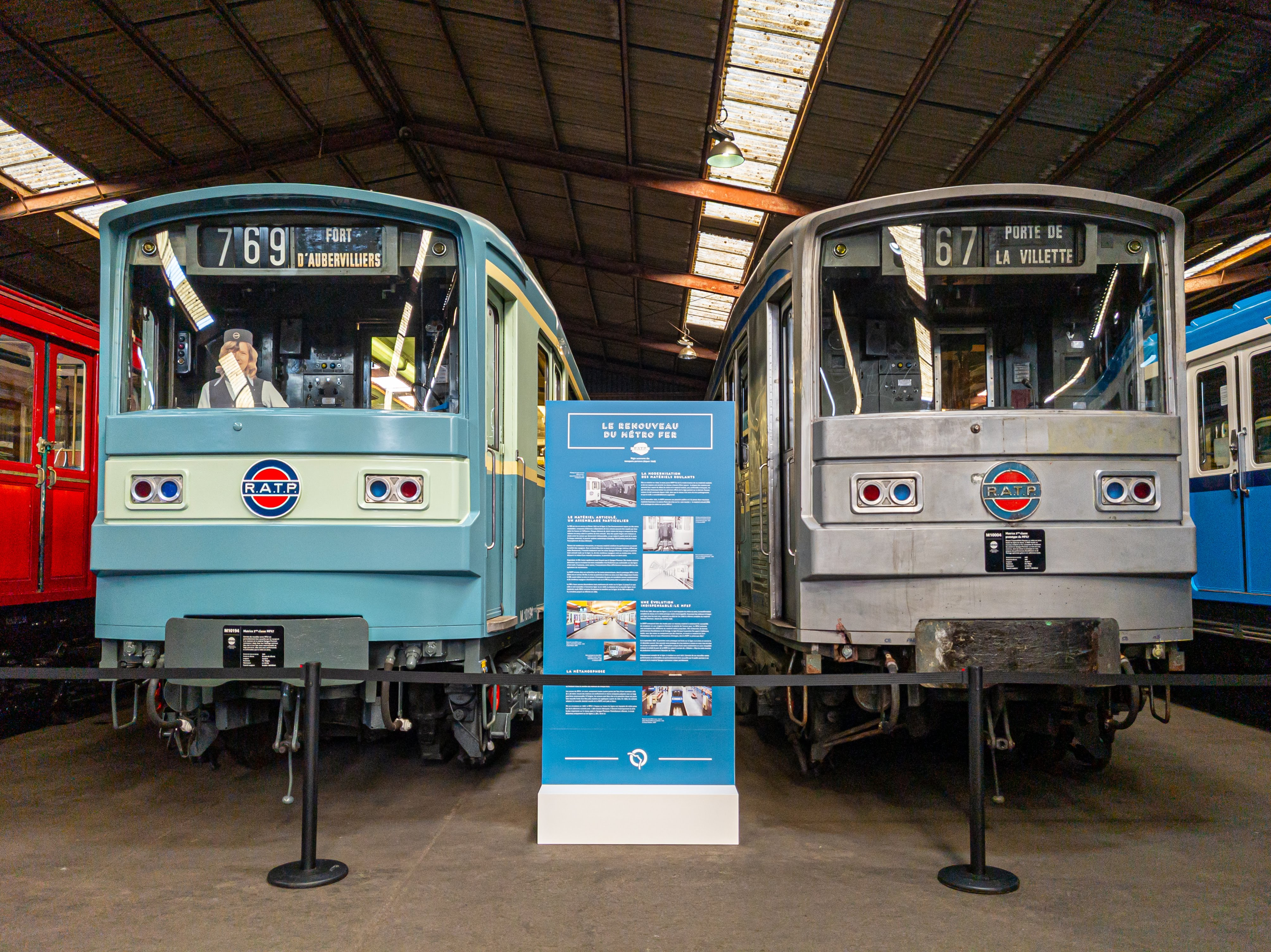
M.10004 at the RATP heritage depot, in 2021.
