= Judah Stadthagen =

18th century rabbinical author

Judah ben Benjamin Wolf Stadthagen (Yiddish: יהודה בן בנימין וואלף שטאטהאגן), also known as Halberstadt, was an 18th-century rabbinical author.

He is best known for his work Minḥat Yehudah, which provides explanations of all instances where the word ke-lomar appears in Rashi's commentary on tractate Berakhot. He published a similar work on tractates Shabbat, Eruvin, and Berakhot in Altona in 1768. He also published there in 1765 a discourse on the passage Tsenon ve-Zayit, which discusses the blessings recited over radishes and olives.
