= Ze'ev Maghen =

Israeli academic

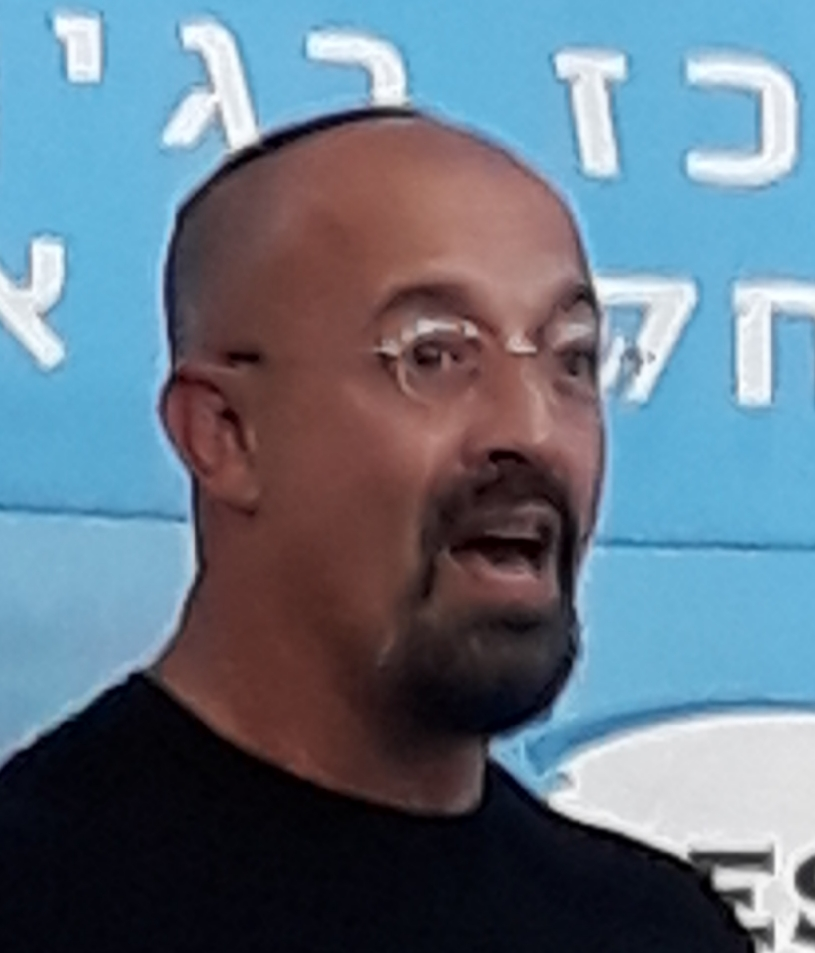
Ze’ev Maghen

Ze’ev Maghen (Hebrew: זאב מגן) is an Israeli scholar. He is a professor of Arabic and Islamic history and chairman of the Department of Middle East Studies at Bar-Ilan University. Maghen is also a senior fellow at the Begin-Sadat Institute for Strategic Studies, as well as the founder of the Middle East and Islamic Studies program at Shalem College in Jerusalem.

Maghen's areas of expertise include Revolutionary Iran, Islamism, the Islamic schism, Tafsir and medieval Islamic jurisprudence. He has written three academic books – Virtues of the Flesh: Purity and Sexuality in Islamic Discourse (Brill, 2005); After Hardship Cometh Ease: Classical Muslim Attitudes to Judaism and Jewish Law (De Gruyter, 2006); and Reading Revolutionary Iran (De Gruyter, 2023) as well as numerous articles in peer-reviewed journals on these subjects. His essay Eradicating the Little Satan: Why Iran Should Be Taken at its Word was the lead article in Commentary (January 2009) and his lengthy treatment Shiite Messianism and Iranian Foreign Policy was the lead article in Middle East Journal (Spring, 2008).

Maghen has written on Jewish and Zionist subjects, as well, and his essay Imagine: John Lennon and the Jews – published in six languages – has been published as a full-length book.

Maghen is fluent in Arabic, Persian, Russian, English, Hebrew and Yiddish. He lectures regularly in the Israel Defense Forces, as well as at universities and in other frameworks in the United States, Europe, Turkey, the Arab World, Russia, Ukraine, India and Latin America. He lives with his wife Anita and four children, Yael, Yoav, Na'ma, and Tamar in Hod HaSharon. He served in the Armored Corps until his discharge from the reserves in 2005. He was the 1984 International Frisbee Golf Champion (Junior Division).

== Selected articles ==
- “Much ado about Wuḍū’,” Der Islam, 76, Spring 1999, pp. 205-252.
- “Close Encounters: Some Preliminary Observations on the Transmission of Impurity in Early Sunni Jurisprudence,” Islamic Law and Society, 6: 3, Summer, 1999, pp. 348–392.
- "השעוביה החדשה: החייאת פולמוס ישן בקרב מתנגדי הרפובליקה האסלאמית באיראן", המזרח החדש, כרך מ"ב, תשס"א, עמ' 186–208. (Translation: “The New Shu‘biyah: The Revival of an Ancient Polemic by the Opposition to the Islamic Republic of Iran,” The New East, 42 [2000]).
- “Dead Tradition: Joseph Schacht and the Origins of ‘Popular Practice’,” Islamic Law and Society, 10: 3, Fall 2003, pp. 276-347 (as guest editor of this issue, I also wrote the introduction, pp. 267-275).
- “First Blood: Purity, Edibility and the Independence of Islamic Jurisprudence,” Der Islam, 81, Spring 2004, pp. 49–95.
- “Ritual Recycling: Abū’l-Ḥasan ‘Alī al-Māwardī and the Question of Second Hand Ablutions,” Bar-Ilan Studies in Arabic and Islamic Culture, 2, Spring 2006, pp. 121–168.
- “Three Shāfi‘ites in Search of Water: The Indulgence of Tayammum and its Rigorous Preconditions,” Der Islam 82 (2005), pp. 291–348.
- “Strangers and Brothers: The Ritual Status of Unbelievers in Islamic Law,” Medieval Encounters, 12/2 (2006), pp. 173–243.
- “Intertwined Triangles: Remarks on the Relationship between Two Prophetic Scandals,” Jerusalem Studies in Arabic and Islam, 33 (2007), pp. 17–92 (Winner of the “Tel-Aviv Prize” for Best Scholarly Article, 2006).
- “See No Evil: Morality and Methodology in Ibn al-Qaṭṭān al-Fāsī’s Aḥkām al-Naẓar bī Ḥāssat al-Baṣar,” Islamic Law and Society, 14 (2007), 52 pp.
- “The Merry Men of Medina: Comedy and Humanity in the Early Days of Islam,” Der Islam, 84 (2007), 74 pp.
- “Occultation in Perpetuum: Shi‘ite Messianism and the Policies of the Islamic Republic,” Middle East Journal, 62 (2008), 34 pp.
- “‘They shall not Draw Nigh’: The Access of Unbelievers to Sacred Space in Islamic and Jewish Law,” Journal of Arabic and Islamic Studies, 12 (2007), 41 pp.
- “From Potent Nemesis to Potemkin Village: A Shift in the Iranian Portrayal of the ‘Zionist Regime,’” Israel Affairs, 21 (2006), 27 pp.
- “Davidic Motifs in the Biography of Muḥammad,” Jerusalem Studies in Arabic and Islam, 34 (2008), pp. 91–139.
- “That Nature which Contemns its Origin: A Controversial Teachers’ Examination Sheds Light on Transformations in Revolutionary Iranian Islam,” Harvard Middle Eastern and Islamic Review, 8 (2009), 43 pp.
- “Unity and Hegemony: Iranian Attitudes to the Sunni-Shi‘i Divide,” in Tel-Aviv University's Sunni-Shi‘ Relations Conference volume (eds. Meir Litvak and Ofra Bengio), 2010.
- “Dancing in Chains: The Baffling Coexistence of Legalism and Exuberance in Judaic and Islamic Tradition,” in Judaic Sources in Western Thought: Jerusalem's Enduring Presence (ed. Jon Jacobs. Oxford: Oxford University Press, 2011).
- “Jews (and Christians) for ‘Ali: Precedent and Prognostication in al-Majlisi’s Kitab al-Ihtijaj” (forthcoming in JIS)
