= Ze'ev Wolf Kitzes =

Ze'ev Wolf Kitzes (Yiddish: זאב וואלף קיצעס, Russian: рабби Зеев Волф Кицис; born c. 1685 – died 12 Cheshvan 1788, Poland) was a noted Hasidic rabbi. According to the family tradition of a Medzhibozh branch of his descendants, the Rabbi was born in 1696 and died in 1765.

He was the rabbi of the Tulchin aka Tulchyn (Тульчин) community in Vinnitsya. Later he moved to Medzhibozh where he, together with Rabbi David Purkes, stood at the head of the group of Chassidim that preceded the Baal Shem Tov. When the Baal Shem Tov arrived in Medzhibozh, Kitzes and Purkes opposed him. However, they later accepted and supported his leadership. Kitzes was a student of the Baal Shem Tov. He was the Baal Tokeah (the one who blows the Shofar) at the beit midrash of the Baal Shem Tov.

Rabbi Yitzchak Michelowitz of Radvil writes that Kitzes was famous for his piety and meticulous observance of Mizvot, to the extent that "he would even [ritually] immerse a needle". In a book called Me'ah Shearim, it is mentioned that Kitzes was very strict about not eating meat that was made kosher with him not being present, even if his rabbi, the Baal Shem Tov, was present. There are many stories about him in the biography of Baal Shem Tov called Shivhei ha-Besht (In Praise of the Ba'al Shem Tov).

Kitzes is buried in Medzhibozh next to the Ba'al Shem Tov.

== Children ==
- Nachman Kitzes
- Abraham Kazis from Vishnevets
- Ozer Kitzes
- Fyvush Kitzes
- Chaim Israel Kitzes
- Etia married to Yankiel Ichowicz
- A daughter married Rabbi Yosef the son of Rabbi David of Mykolaiv, a student of the Besht
- Yehudis married the son of Rabbi David Purkes, a student of the Besht, and Chief Judge in the Medzhibozh Beth Din
- A daughter married into a prominent, wealthy family in the city of Iaşi

== See also ==
- Zev Wolf (disambiguation page)
