= Wolff =

Wolff is a variant of the Wolf surname which is derived from the baptismal names Wolfgang or Wolfram.

== List of people surnamed Wolff ==
=== A ===
- Albert Wolff (disambiguation), several people
- Alex Wolff, American actor
- Alexander Wolff, American writer
- Alexander Wolff (soldier), (1788–1863), British officer who served under the Duke of Wellington
- Andreas Wolff (born 1991), German handball player
- Annemarie Wolff (born 1990), German politician
- Auguste Wolff (1821–1887), French piano maker

=== B ===
- Betje Wolff (1738–1804), Dutch writer
- Bernhard Wolff (1811–1879), German media mogul
- Bernard Wolff Beffie (1872–1943), Dutch chess master and dermatologist
- Beverly Wolff (1928–2005), American mezzo-soprano
- Bobby Wolff (born 1932), American bridge player

=== C ===
- Carl Gustaf Wolff, a prominent Finnish shipowner and businessman
- Caspar Friedrich Wolff (1734–1794), founder of embryology
- Christian Wolff (disambiguation), several people
- Christina Wolff, American politician
- Christoph Wolff (born 1940), German-born musicologist
- Cynthia Griffin Wolff (1936–2024), American literary historian

=== D ===
- Dunja Wolff (born 1962), German politician

=== E ===
- Ed Wolff (actor) (1907–1966), American actor
- Edward Wolff (born 1946), American economist
- Elsie Wolff Van Sandau, British suffragette, see Mathilde Wolff Van Sandau
- Enrique Wolff (born 1949), Argentine football player
- Ernst Victor Wolff (1886–1961), German-born classical pianist and harpsichordist

=== F ===
- Francis Wolff, photographer and the founder of Blue Note Records
- Francis Wolff (philosopher) (born 1950), French philosopher, see List of French philosophers
- Franklin Merrell-Wolff (1887–1985), an American mystical philosopher
- Freddie Wolff (1910–1988), British sprinter
- Friedrich Wilhelm Wolff (1816-1887), German sculptor and journalist

=== G ===
- Geoffrey Wolff (born 1937), American writer

=== H ===
- Hans Wolff (disambiguation), multiple people
- Hellmuth Wolff (disambiguation), multiple people
- Heinz Wolff (1928–2017), German-British scientist and television and radio presenter
- Henny Wolff (1896–1965), German soprano concert singer and voice teacher
- Henry Drummond Wolff (1830–1908), English diplomat

=== I ===
- Iris Wolff (born 1977), German writer
- Irving Wolff (1894–1982), American physicist

=== J ===
- J. Scott Wolff (1878–1958), American politician from Missouri
- Jan Wolff, German endocrinologist
- James H. Wolff (1847–1913) American lawyer, war veteran, civil rights activist
- Johann Friedrich Wolff (1778–1806), German botanist
- Jonathan Wolff (disambiguation), several people
- Josh Wolff (born 1977), American soccer player
- Joseph Wolff (1795–1862), Jewish Christian missionary from Germany
- Joseph C. Wolff (1849–1896), New York politician
- Julius Wolff (disambiguation), several people
- Johannes "Hans" Hermann Wolff (1896–1976), German Engineer

=== K ===
- Karin Wolff (1959), German politician
- Karl Wolff (1900–1984), high-ranking member of the Schutzstaffel
- Karl Felix Wolff (1879–1966), self-taught folklorist of the South Tyrol
- Kurt Wolff (disambiguation), several people

=== L ===
- Lester L. Wolff (1919–2021), American politician
- Lewis Wolff (born 1935), American billionaire real estate developer
- Louis Wolff (1898–1972), American cardiologist

=== M ===
- Maritta Wolff (1918–2002) American novelist
- Mathilde Wolff Van Sandau (1843–1926), British suffragette
- Matthew Wolff (born 1999), American golfer
- Max-Eckart Wolff (1902-1988), German naval commander
- Michael Wolff (disambiguation), several people
- Milton Wolff (1915–2008), commander of the Lincoln Battalion

=== N ===
- Nat Wolff (born 1994), American actor
- Nelson Wolff (born 1940), American politician
- Noah Wolff (1809–1907), German industrialist and community leader

=== O ===
- Otto Herbert Wolff (1920–2010) German-British paediatrician

=== P ===
- Pat Wolff American pediatrician
- Patrick Wolff (born 1968), American chess player
- Peter Wolff (disambiguation), several people

=== R ===
- Richard Wolff (disambiguation), several people
- Rikard Wolff (1958–2017), Swedish actor
- Robert Wolff (disambiguation), several people
- Roger Wolff (1911–1994), American baseball player

=== S ===
- S. Drummond Wolff (1916–2004), English organist, mainly active in America
- Salomon (Sam) de Wolff (1878–1960), Dutch economist and politician
- Sam Wolff (born 1991), American baseball player
- Sheldon Wolff (1928–2008), American radiobiologist and cytogeneticist
- Sheldon M. Wolff (1930–1994), American physician and immunologist
- Stefan Wolff, German political scientist and professor living in the UK
- Sula Wolff (1924–2009), prominent British child psychiatrist
- Susanne Wolff (born 1973), German actress
- Susie Wolff (born 1982), British racing driver

=== T ===
- Theodor Wolff (1868–1943), German journalist
- Thomas Wolff (1954–2000), American mathematician
- Tobias Barrington Wolff (born 1970), American professor of law
- Tobias Wolff (born 1945), American writer
- Toto Wolff (born 1972), Austrian racing driver and investor

=== U ===
- Ulla Wolff (1850-1924), German journalist, playwright and novelist

=== V ===
- Virginia Euwer Wolff (1882–1941), English writer
- Victoria Wolff (1903–1992), German born American writer and screenwriter.

=== W ===
- Werner Wolff (disambiguation), several people
- William Wolff (1927–2020), German-British journalist and rabbi
