= Alexander Wolfe =

Alexander Wolfe may refer to:

- Alexander Wolfe (wrestler), German professional wrestler
- Alexander Wolfe (musician), British musician

== See also ==
- Alexander Wolf, German biathlete
- Alexander L. Wolf, computer scientist
- Alexander Wolff
- Alexander Wolff (soldier)
- Alex Wolf (disambiguation)
