= Sam Woolf =

Sam Woolf may refer to:

- Sam Woolf (singer-songwriter)
- Sam Woolf (actor)

== See also ==
- Sam Wolff, American baseball pitcher
