= Alex Wolf =

Alex Wolf may refer to:

- Alex Wolf (bobsleigh)
- Alex Wolf (water polo)

== See also ==
- Alex Wolff, an American actor, musician, and filmmaker
- Alex Woolf, a medieval historian
- Alex Woolf (composer), a classical music composer
- Alexander Wolf, a German biathlete
- Alexander L. Wolf, a computer scientist
- Alexander Wolfe (disambiguation)
- Alexander Wolff, a sports writer and former team owner
- Alexander Wolff (soldier)
