= Richard Wolf =

Richard Wolf or Richard Wolff may refer to:

- Richard Wolff (speedway rider) (born 1976), Czech motorcycle speedway rider
- Rick Wolff (writer) (1951–2023), minor league baseball second baseman, coach, author and sports psychologist
- Richard Wolff (wrestler) (born 1948), German Olympic wrestler
- Richard D. Wolff (born 1942), American Marxian economist
- Richard Wolf (director) (born 1956), Brazilian-American documentary film director
- Richard Wolf (composer), American film and television composer

== See also ==
- Rikard Wolff (1958–2017), Swedish stage and screen actor and singer
- Richard Wolffe (born 1968), British-American journalist
- Ror Wolf (born Richard Georg Wolf, 1932–2020), German writer
- Dick Wolf (born 1946), American television creator
- Dick Wolf (American football) (1900–1967), American football player
- Rich Wolfe (died 2020), American sports writer and marketer
