= Jazz Chisholm Jr. =

Bahamian baseball player (born 1998)

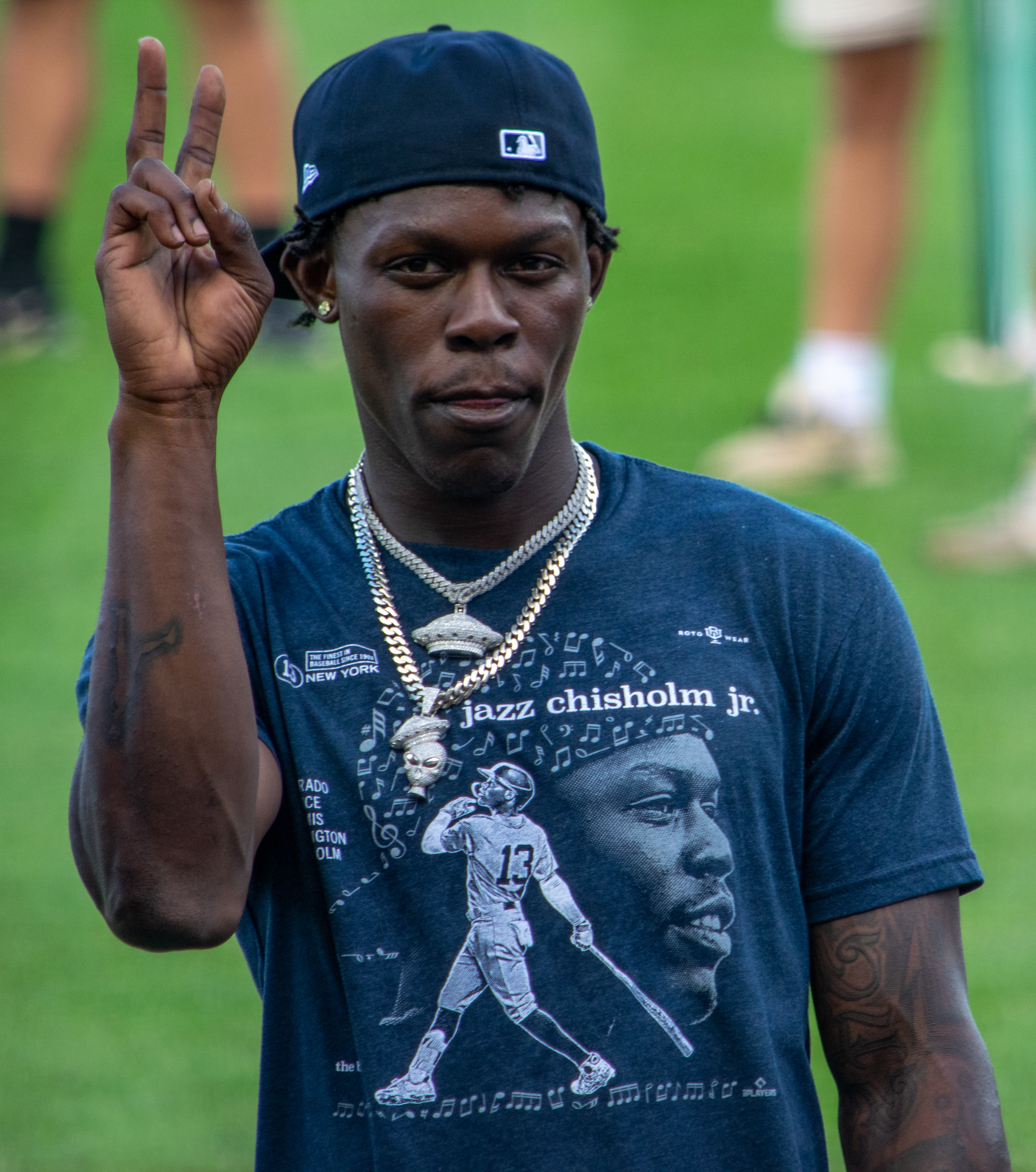
- Chisholm in 2024

Free agent
- Infielder
- Born: February 1, 1998 (age 28); Nassau, Bahamas
- Bats: Left Throws: Right

MLB debut
- September 1, 2020, for the Miami Marlins

MLB statistics (through 2026 season)
- Batting average: .245
- Home runs: 127
- Runs batted in: 363
- Stolen bases: 171
- Stats at Baseball Reference

Teams
- Miami Marlins (2020–2024); New York Yankees (2024–2026)

Career highlights and awards
- 2× All-Star (2022, 2025); Silver Slugger Award (2025)

Jasrado Prince Hermis Arrington "Jazz" Chisholm Jr. (born February 1, 1998) is a Bahamian professional baseball infielder and center fielder who is a free agent. He has played in Major League Baseball (MLB) for the Miami Marlins and New York Yankees. Chisholm signed with the Arizona Diamondbacks as an international free agent in 2015, and made his MLB debut in 2020 with the Marlins. He was named an All-Star in 2022 and 2025. Chisholm has competed internationally for the Great Britain national baseball team.

== Early life ==
Chisholm is from Nassau, the Bahamas. He was drawn to baseball by his grandmother, Patricia Coakley, who played shortstop for the Bahamian national softball team; she taught him to hit at two years old. Chisholm moved to the United States at 12 years old to attend high school at Life Prep Academy in Wichita, Kansas. He played basketball and football in addition to baseball at Life Prep. After high school, he returned to the Bahamas to train at a sports academy.

== Career ==
=== Arizona Diamondbacks ===
Chisholm signed with the Arizona Diamondbacks as an international free agent in July 2015 for $200,000. He made his professional debut in 2016 with the Missoula Osprey, batting .281 with nine home runs, 37 runs batted in (RBIs), and 13 stolen bases in 62 games played. Chisholm spent 2017 with the Kane County Cougars but was limited due to injury. In 29 games for Kane County, he posted a .248 average with one home run and 12 RBIs. He began 2018 with Kane County and was promoted to the Visalia Rawhide in July. In 112 games between both teams, he batted .272 with 25 home runs and 70 RBIs. Chisholm began 2019 with the Jackson Generals.

=== Miami Marlins (2020–2024) ===
On July 31, 2019, the Diamondbacks traded Chisholm to the Miami Marlins for pitcher Zac Gallen. Chisholm played for the Jacksonville Jumbo Shrimp for the rest of the season. Over 112 games between Jackson and Jacksonville, Chisholm slashed .220/.321/.441 with 21 home runs, 54 RBIs, and 16 stolen bases. Chisholm was added to the Marlins' 40-man roster following the 2019 season.

Chisholm was promoted to the major leagues for the first time on September 1, 2020, and made his defensive debut that night against the Toronto Blue Jays. Chisholm's first at-bat was in the following game against Toronto on September 2. On September 6, Chisholm recorded his first career major league hit while facing the Tampa Bay Rays. Three days later, Chisholm hit his first career major league home run against the Atlanta Braves.

In 2021, Chisholm made the Marlins out of spring training as the team's starting second baseman. In 2021, he hit .248/.303/.425 with 18 home runs, 53 RBIs, and 23 stolen bases. He had the fastest sprint speed of all major league second basemen, at 29.1 feet/second.

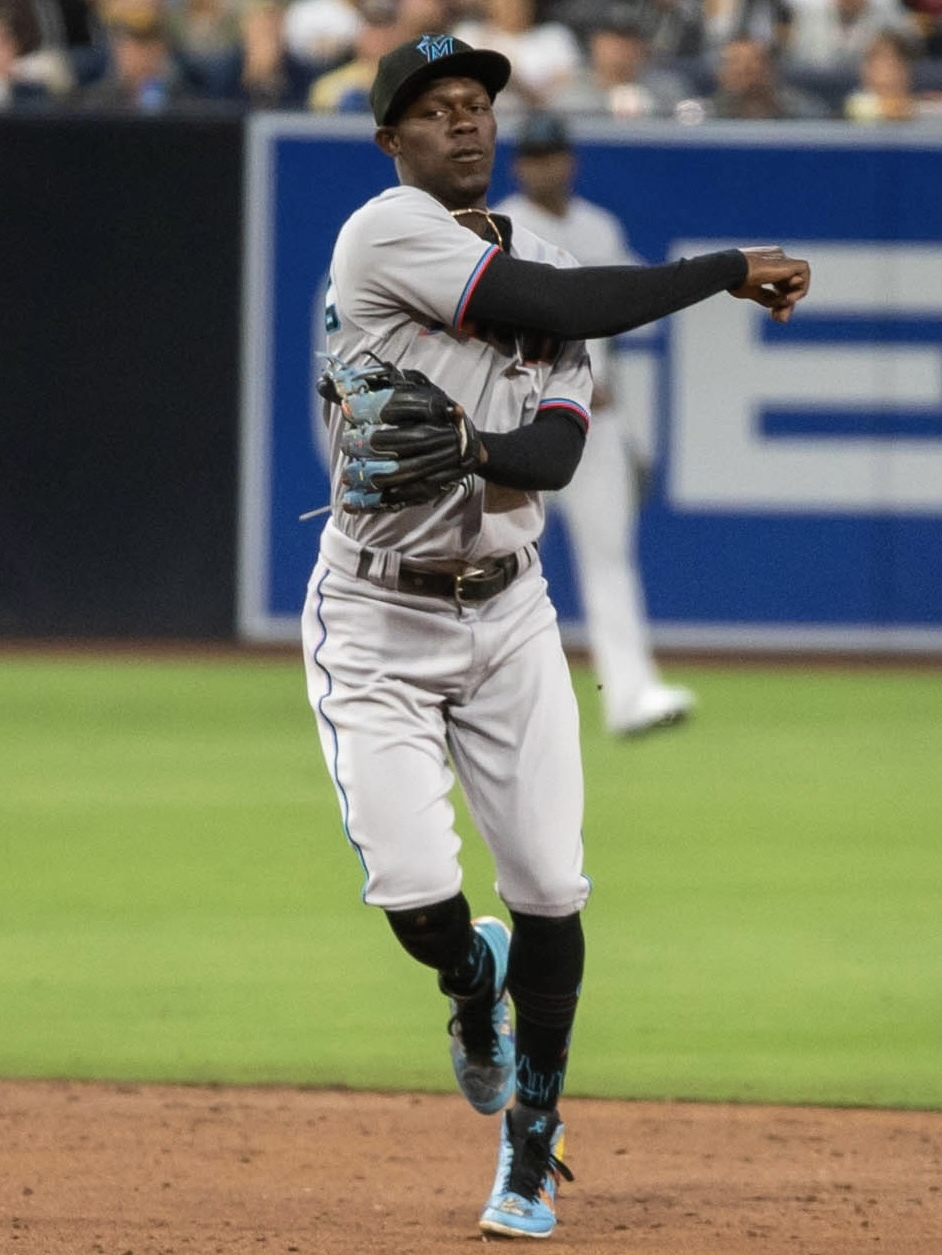
Chisholm with the Marlins in 2022

By mid-season 2022, Chisholm was hitting for a .254 batting average, alongside 14 home runs, 45 RBIs, 39 runs scored, 12 stolen bases, and an on base plus slugging percentage of .860. He was the National League leader at his position in on base plus slugging percentage, home runs, RBIs, slugging percentage, (.535) and triples (4). Chisholm made the All-Star Game for the first time in his career, being named the starting second baseman for the National League. He became the first Bahamian-born player to make the All-Star Game roster. He did not play in the game, as he was placed on the injured list on June 29, due to what was then diagnosed as right lower back strain. On July 22, the Marlins stated that Chisholm had a stress reaction in his lower back and would miss at least six weeks of the season. On September 10, it was confirmed that Chisholm would be out for the rest of the season. In 60 games that season, he hit .254/.325/.535 with 14 home runs, 10 doubles, 4 triples, 45 RBIs, and 12 stolen bases.

Chisholm said that he was the target of significant hazing in the Marlins clubhouse. Miguel Rojas ruined multiple custom made cleats that belonged to Chisholm, cutting them with scissors and pouring milk in them. Chisholm criticized Rojas calling him a bad team captain and bad teammate saying that behavior like his shows lack of leadership in bringing rookie teammates down. Manager Don Mattingly called a team meeting in 2022 to try to resolve the issues.

The Marlins moved Chisholm to center field before the 2023 season after the team acquired Luis Arráez. In 97 games for Miami, Chisholm batted .250/.304/.457 with a career-high 19 home runs, 51 RBI, and 22 stolen bases. He went 0-for-8 as the Marlins lost both games of the National League Wild Card Series. Following the season on October 10, Chisholm underwent surgery to repair turf toe in his right foot.

Prior to the 2024 season, Chisholm lost his salary arbitration case and had a $2.6 million salary for the season. As rumors circulated that the Marlins might trade Chisholm, the Marlins resumed playing him at second base on July 13.

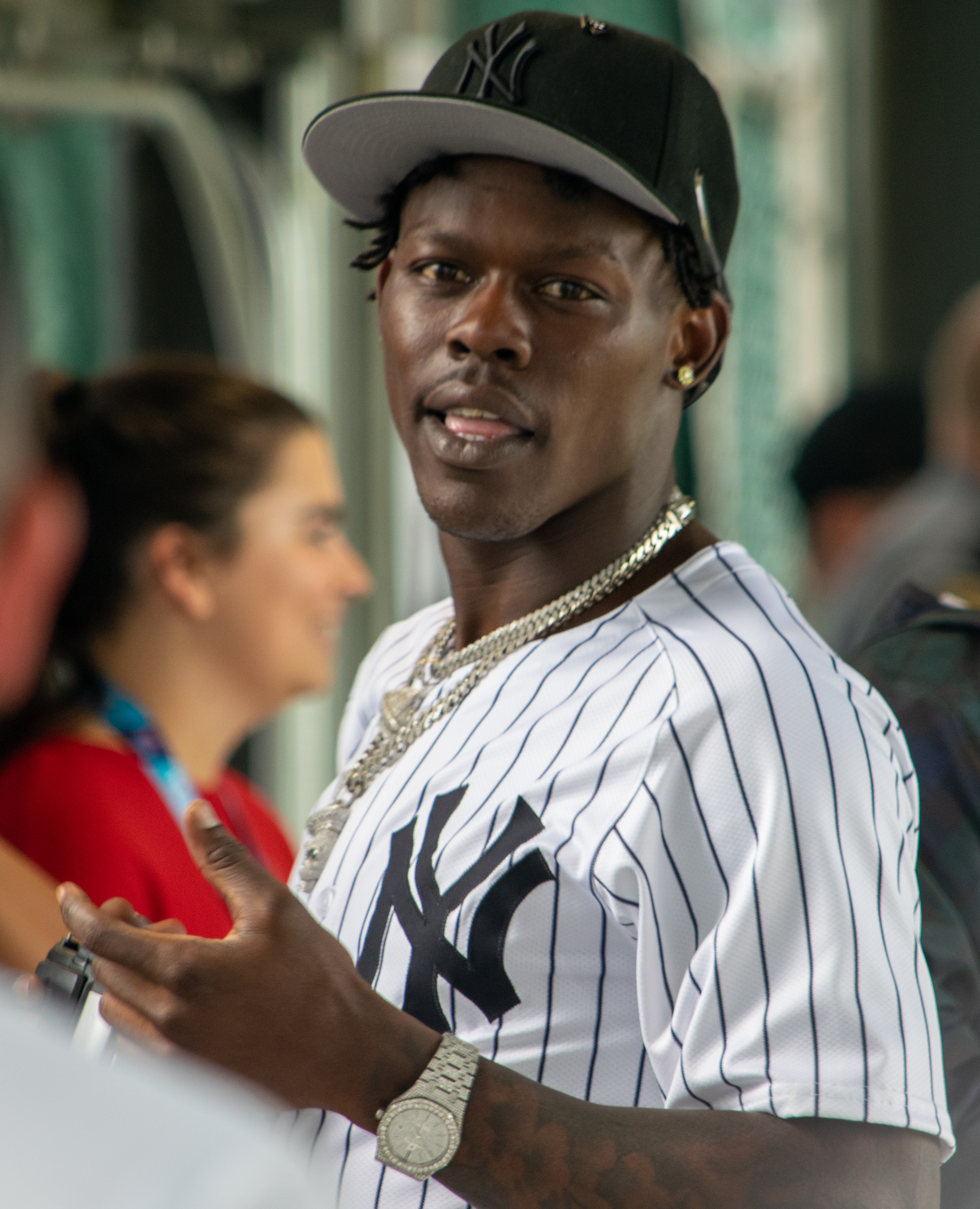
Chisholm with the Yankees in 2024

=== New York Yankees (2024–present) ===
On July 27, 2024, the Marlins traded Chisholm to the New York Yankees in exchange for minor league prospects Agustín Ramírez, Jared Serna, and Abrahan Ramírez. In his first 3 games as a Yankee, Chisholm hit 4 home runs, the first player to accomplish that feat in franchise history. Despite never playing the position before, the Yankees primarily played him at third base. He suffered a sprained left elbow against the Chicago White Sox on August 12, and was placed on the 10-day injured list (IL). After coming off the IL on Aug 23, Chisholm finished the regular season batting a career-high .256/.324/.436 with 24 home runs, 73 RBI, and 40 stolen bases. In Game 1 of the World Series, he went 2-for-5 with a run scored and two stolen bases in a 6–3, extra-inning loss to the Los Angeles Dodgers. His two steals in the 10th inning tied a World Series record. Chisholm finished the World Series batting 5-of-21 with one home run and four steals.

Chisholm started the 2025 season playing at second base. He missed all of May with an oblique strain. Returning on June 3, he hit the go-ahead home run to help the Yankees defeat the Cleveland Guardians. Due to DJ LeMahieu's return while Chisholm was out, the team put Chisholm back at third base. Then, starting on June 8, manager Aaron Boone announced Chisholm's return to second base, with Oswald Peraza taking over at third and LeMahieu heading to the bench. On June 23, Chisholm lost his shoes as a baserunner but was able to score. On July 10, he was named as a participant in the MLB Home Run Derby. He hit only three home runs in the contest, the fewest of eight participants. On September 19, Chisholm joined the 30–30 club after hitting his 30th home run of the season during a game against the Baltimore Orioles. He became the second player in 2025, and the third Yankee in history, with at least 30 home runs and 30 stolen bases in a season. He was hit by a pitch in the Yankees' second-to-last game of the season, forcing him out of the game. He finished his first full season with the Yankees batting .242/.332/.481 in 130 games.

In Game 4 of the 2025 American League Division Series against the Toronto Blue Jays, with the Yankees trailing 2–1 in the seventh inning, Chisholm committed a costly error when he misplayed a routine groundball from Andrés Giménez. Instead of an inning-ending double play, Chisholm's miscue allowed Giménez to reach first base and Ernie Clement to advance to third base. Two batters later, Nathan Lukes would hit a single to right field and drive in both runners, extending the Blue Jays’ lead to 4–1. The Blue Jays would ultimately win the game 5–2, eliminating the Yankees from the postseason.

== International career ==
As a Bahamian, Chisholm is eligible to represent both the Bahamas and Great Britain in international competition, because the Bahamas is a former British colony and Commonwealth realm. He played for Great Britain in the 2017 World Baseball Classic (WBC) Qualifiers, held in 2016. He hit .250 in four games, with four hits, one RBI, and six strikeouts as they lost a qualifying match to Israel.

Chisholm did not join Great Britain in the 2023 World Baseball Classic qualifiers in Germany, as they took place during the 2022 MLB season. Upon the team's qualification on September 20, he announced that he would again play for Great Britain in the 2023 World Baseball Classic. However, the Marlins did not allow him to do so, since he was recovering from an injury. In 2025, Chisholm reportedly said he was interested in playing for Great Britain in the 2026 World Baseball Classic. In February 2026, the Great Britain roster for the 2026 World Baseball Classic was announced, which included Chisholm. Placed in Pool B, hosted by Daikin Park, Houston, Great Britain played Mexico in their first match. Chisholm recorded five at-bats alongside teammate Nate Eaton in what was his first appearance for the team in ten years. Great Britain lost 8–2.

== Personal life ==
Chisholm was the cover athlete of MLB The Show 23, the first Marlins player to be on the video game series' cover.

Chisholm regularly wears colorful jewelry and accessories on the field, including a Straw Hat necklace and cleats inspired by the anime series One Piece.

Chisholm established the nonprofit Jazz Chisholm Foundation in 2023. His foundation supports young athletes in Miami, New York, and the Bahamas.

Chisholm got engaged to singer/reality television personality Ahnalys "Ahna Mac" Santiago on December 25th, 2025.

== See also ==
- List of Major League Baseball annual fielding errors leaders
- List of Major League Baseball players from the Bahamas
- 30–30 club
