= Matt Moore (baseball) =

American baseball player (born 1989)

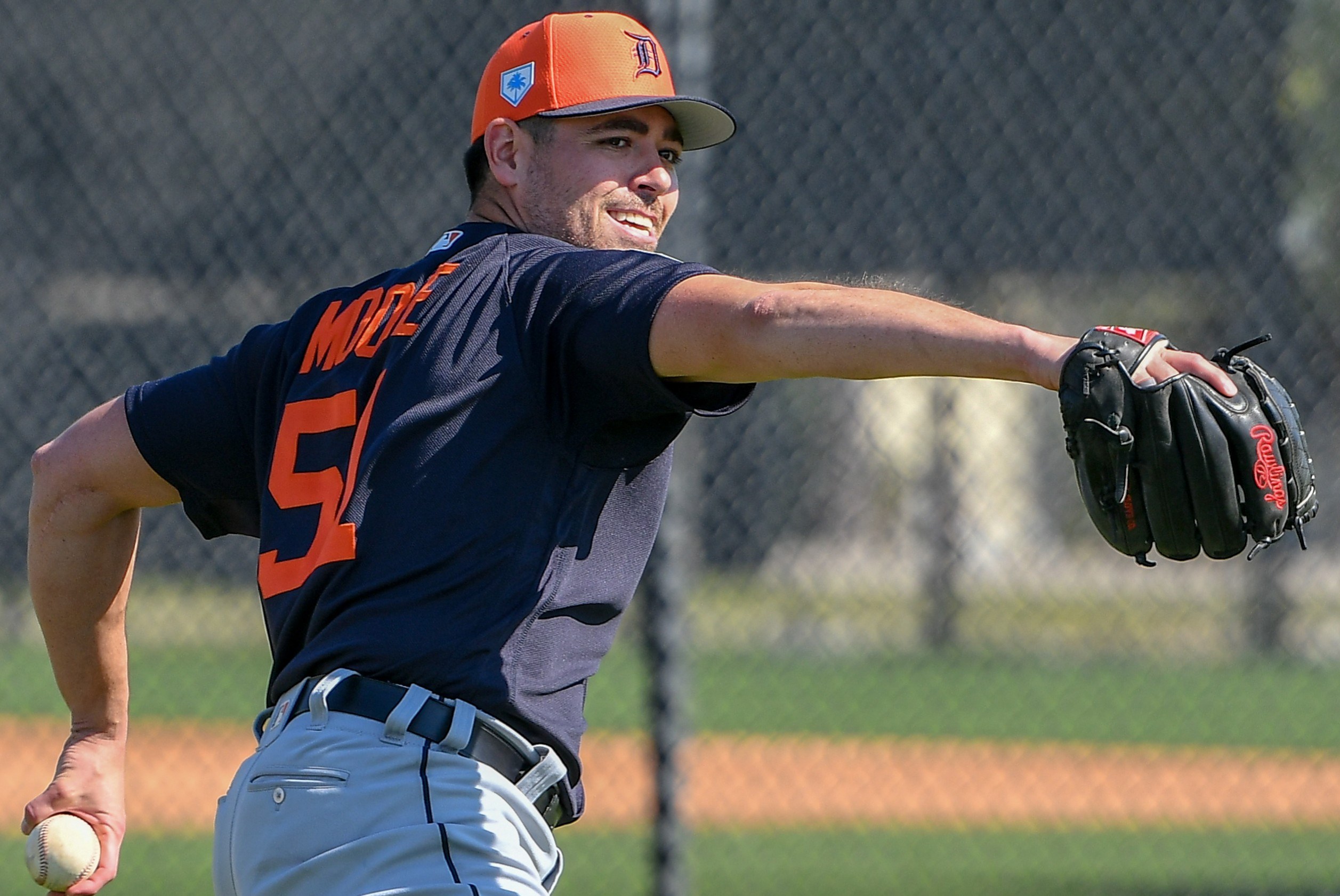
- Moore with the Detroit Tigers in 2019

Free agent
- Pitcher
- Born: June 18, 1989 (age 37); Fort Walton Beach, Florida, U.S.
- Bats: Left Throws: Left

Professional debut
- MLB: September 14, 2011, for the Tampa Bay Rays
- NPB: June 23, 2020, for the Fukuoka SoftBank Hawks

MLB statistics (through 2024 season)
- Win–loss record: 71–66
- Earned run average: 4.39
- Strikeouts: 1,053

NPB statistics (through 2020 season)
- Win-loss record: 6–3
- Earned run average: 2.65
- Strikeouts: 89
- Stats at Baseball Reference

Teams
- Tampa Bay Rays (2011–2016); San Francisco Giants (2016–2017); Texas Rangers (2018); Detroit Tigers (2019); Fukuoka SoftBank Hawks (2020); Philadelphia Phillies (2021); Texas Rangers (2022); Los Angeles Angels (2023); Cleveland Guardians (2023); Miami Marlins (2023); Los Angeles Angels (2024)

Career highlights and awards
- All-Star (2013); Japan Series champion (2020)

Matthew Cody Moore (born June 18, 1989) is an American professional baseball pitcher who is a free agent. He has previously played in Major League Baseball (MLB) for the Tampa Bay Rays, San Francisco Giants, Texas Rangers, Detroit Tigers, Philadelphia Phillies, Los Angeles Angels, Cleveland Guardians, and Miami Marlins, and in Nippon Professional Baseball (NPB) for the Fukuoka SoftBank Hawks.

Born in Fort Walton Beach, Florida, Moore's family moved to Okinawa when he was seven and Edgewood, New Mexico in 2000. Although he had committed to play college baseball with the University of New Mexico, Moore chose to sign a professional contract with the Rays after they selected him in the 2007 MLB draft. He set multiple strikeout records for the Rays' farm system before making his major league debut in 2011. Moore spent two full seasons with the Rays before Tommy John surgery caused him to miss the 2014 season. He returned in 2015, and was traded to the Giants the following year.

Moore struggled with run control in his second season with the Giants, leading the National League in earned runs allowed, and was traded to the Rangers in the 2018 offseason. His earned run average (ERA) stayed high with the Rangers, and he was sent to the bullpen to focus on his technique. In 2019, the Tigers signed Moore to a one-year contract, hoping for a rebound season, but he played only two games before suffering a season-ending knee injury. Moore spent one year with the Japan Series-winning Hawks before returning to the US in 2021 to play with the Phillies.

== Early life ==
Moore was born on June 18, 1989, in Fort Walton Beach, Florida. When he was seven years old, his family moved to Kadena Air Base in Okinawa, Japan, where his father was working on helicopters for the Air Force Special Operations Command. In 2000, Moore and his family moved to Edgewood, New Mexico, where his older brother Bobby was set to begin high school. Both brothers attended Moriarty High School and would practice pitching at home, on a mound in their backyard.

Moore experienced a growth spurt between his sophomore and junior year of high school, which caught the attention of college recruiters and professional scouts. During his senior season, he helped take the Moriarty Pintos to a state runner-up title and was named Gatorade Player of the Year. Moore had committed to play college baseball at the University of New Mexico, his brother's alma mater, before he was taken by the Tampa Bay Rays of Major League Baseball (MLB) in the eighth round of the 2007 MLB draft.

== Professional career ==
=== Tampa Bay Rays ===
==== Minor leagues ====
After being drafted 245th overall, Moore signed a $115,000 contract with the Rays in 2007. He debuted that year with the Rookie Princeton Rays at the age of 18. In his first minor league season, he had a 0–0 win–loss record, a 2.66 earned run average (ERA), and 29 strikeouts in 8 games and 20 1/3 innings with the Rays. In 2008, he posted a 2–2 record, 1.66 ERA, and 77 strikeouts in 54 1/3 innings. At the end of his first full season in 2008, Moore was named a Baseball America Rookie All-Star.

In 2009, Moore was assigned to the Single–A Bowling Green Hot Rods for their inaugural season. He was selected to start the first game in Hot Rods history. On June 8, 2009, Moore was named the South Atlantic League Pitcher of the Week after throwing seven shutout innings in a 10–2 win over the Asheville Tourists. He went 8–5 for the season with a 3.15 ERA in 26 starts, and led the league with 176 strikeouts in 123 innings. The following year, Moore had a standout season with the High–A Charlotte Stone Crabs. His 208 strikeouts in 144 2/3 innings were the most in the Florida State League since Michael Cosgrove in 1971. Issues with pitch control, however, led to a 3.36 ERA and a 1.18 walks plus hits per inning pitched (WHIP). Mitch Lukevics, the Rays' director of minor-league operations, told FoxSports.com that, in both 2009 and 2010, Moore was "off to a bad start, and the technique [was] not where it need[ed] to be", but he found his stride over the course of the season.

Moore started the 2011 season with the Double-A Montgomery Biscuits. On June 16, he pitched his first career no-hitter, and the first franchise no-hitter for the Biscuits, in an 8–0 victory against the Mobile BayBears. That July, he pitched an inning at the XM Futures Game, retiring all three batters he faced in 11 pitches that reached up to 100 mph (160 km/h). Shortly afterwards, on July 22, he was promoted to the Triple-A Durham Bulls. He went 12–3 for the season, with a 1.92 ERA in 155 innings across 27 starts. Moore's 210 strikeouts were the most of any minor league player in Rays history, breaking his own record from the previous season, and made him the first minor league pitcher to record 200 or more strikeouts in back-to-back seasons.

==== Major leagues ====
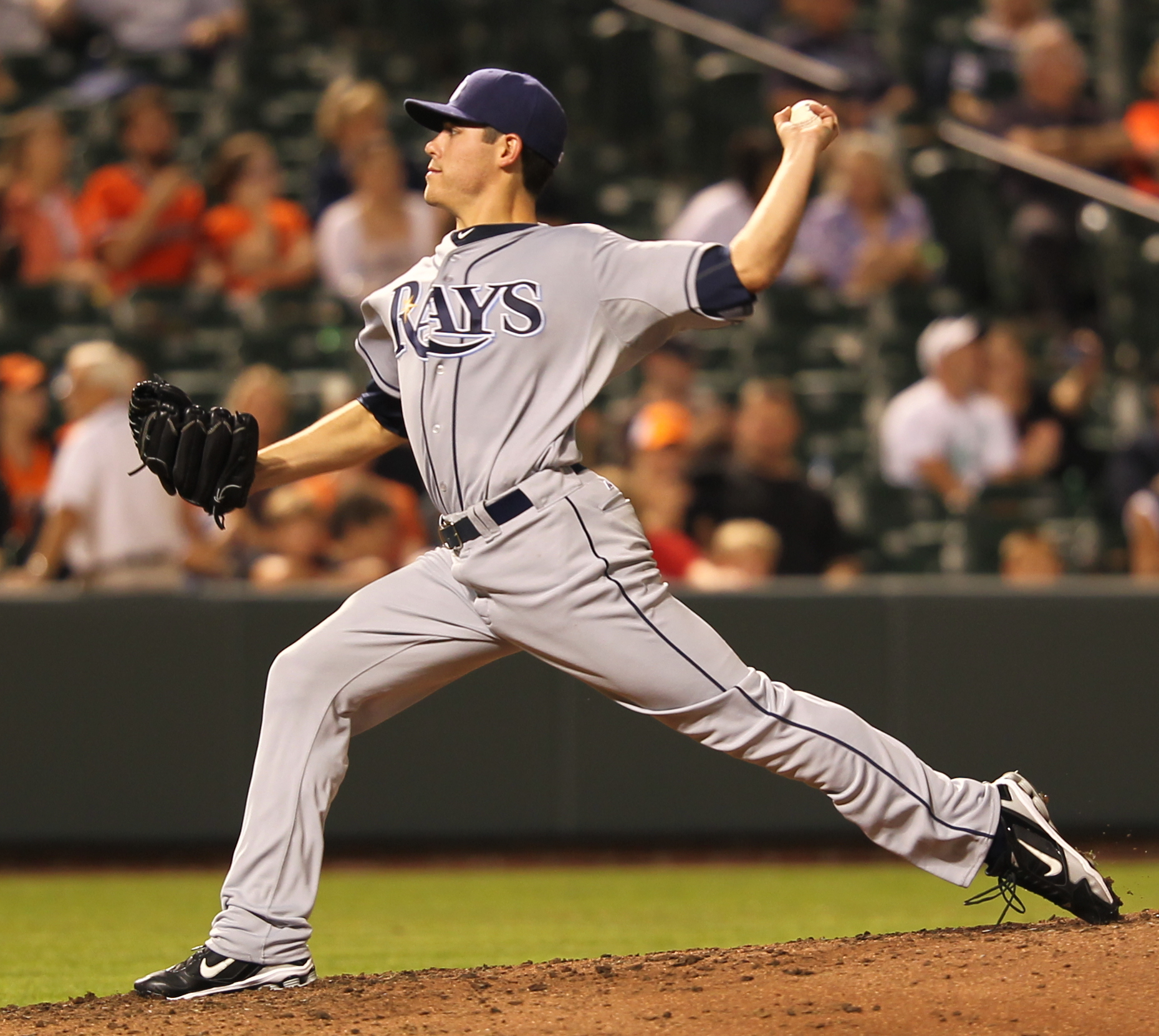
Moore making his major league debut with the Rays in 2011

Moore was called up to the Rays on September 11, 2011, and made his MLB debut three days later, giving up a two-run home run to Matt Wieters in the eighth inning of a 6–2 loss against the Baltimore Orioles. His performance recovered in time for his first major league start on September 22, becoming the first pitcher in MLB history to pitch 11 strikeouts in five innings or fewer against the New York Yankees. The Rays went on to win 15–8. Moore was given the start in Game 1 of the 2011 American League Division Series (ALDS) against the Texas Rangers, pitching seven shutout innings in a 9–0 victory for the Rays. Moore finished his first major league season with a 1–0 record and a 2.89 ERA in 9 1/3 innings.

On December 9, 2011, the Rays signed Moore to a guaranteed five-year, $14 million contract. His signing was part of a trend within the Rays organization of offering long-term contracts to young pitchers, but his contract was the largest ever in both guaranteed dollars and potential earnings for any pitcher with less than two years of service time.

Moore began with the Rays in 2012 as part of a five-player starting rotation that also included James Shields, David Price, Jeremy Hellickson, and Jeff Niemann. On June 15, Moore combined with relievers Burke Badenhop and Brandon Gomes to pitch a one-hit shutout against the Miami Marlins, winning 11–0 and breaking a three-game losing streak. The Rays gave away a bobblehead figure of Moore on their July 22 game against the Seattle Mariners after the pitcher went 5–1 with a 3.94 ERA in eight starts in June and July. Moore finished the season with an 11–11 record, a 3.81 ERA, and 175 strikeouts in 31 appearances and 177 1/3 innings.

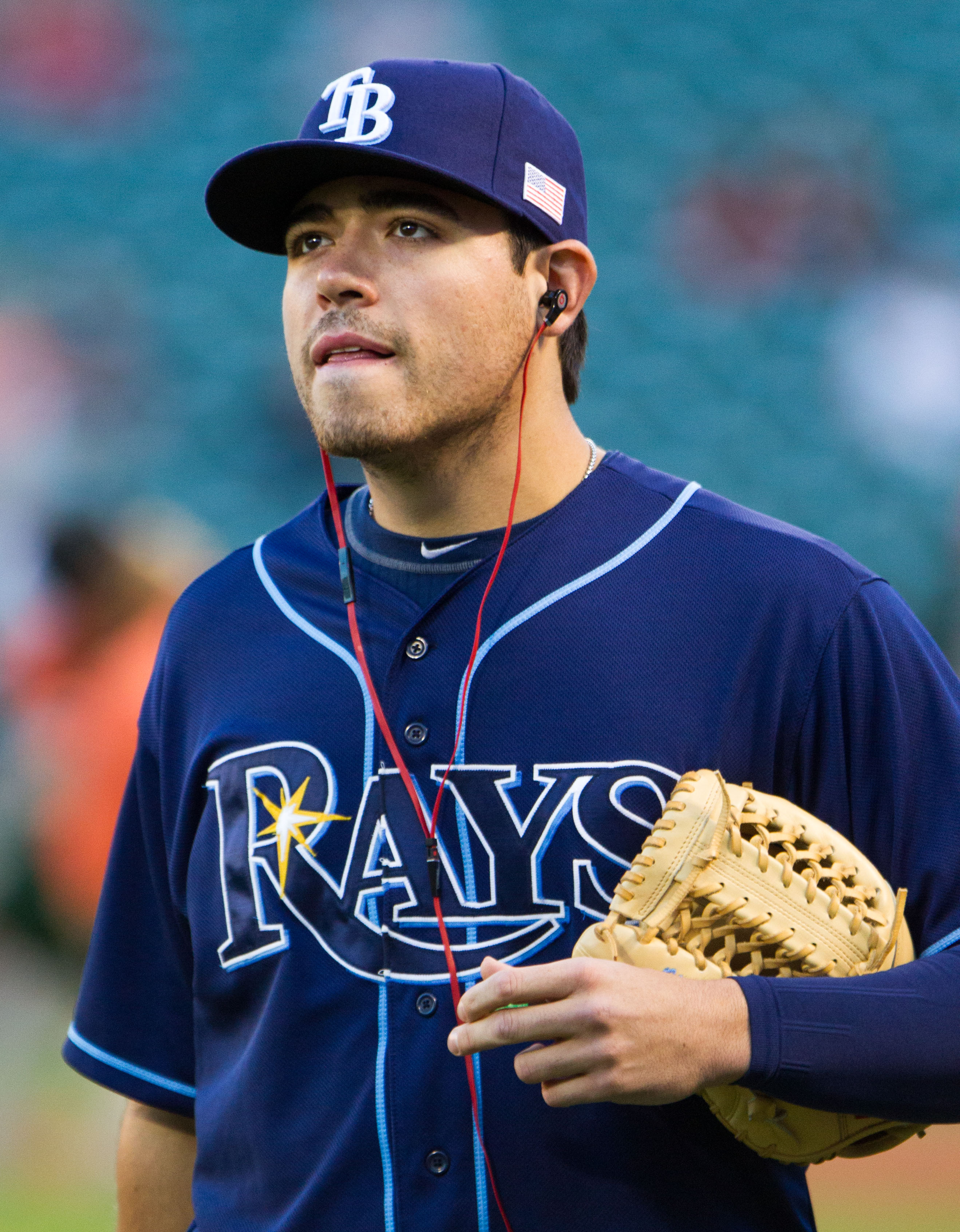
Moore with the Rays in 2012

Returning to the Rays in 2013, Moore became the first left-handed American League (AL) pitcher to begin a season with an 8–0 record at age 23 or younger since Babe Ruth in 1917. After a strong beginning to the season, Moore began to falter, going 0–3 with a 13.86 ERA in his next three starts. He recovered in time to be named to his first ever MLB All-Star Game as a replacement for Yu Darvish, who suffered a strained trapezius. At the time, Moore was tied with Max Scherzer for the most wins in the AL with 13. He pitched for the AL in the fifth inning of the All-Star Game, retiring Carlos González, Yadier Molina, and Troy Tulowitzki in only nine pitches. Moore left a July 28 game against the New York Yankees in the fifth inning with a sore left elbow, and was placed on the 15-day disabled list on July 31. He posted a 17–4 record and a 3.29 ERA that season in 27 appearances and 150 1/3 innings.

Elbow troubles followed Moore into 2014. He exited the mound in the middle of an April 7 game against the Kansas City Royals, and realized after an afternoon throwing session that he could no longer pitch. Moore underwent Tommy John surgery on April 22, 2014, to replace a partially torn ulnar collateral ligament, and was sidelined for the remainder of the season. In the 10 innings that he did pitch that season, Moore was 0–2 and allowed three runs.

Moore began the 2015 season on the 60-day disabled list while recovering from surgery. He began pitching in June, making a series of minor-league rehab assignments for Durham. On June 28, 2015, rookie Matt Andriese was optioned to Durham, presumably to make room in the rotation for Moore. He returned to the Rays on July 2, 2015, giving up six hits and four runs in 4 2/3 innings against the Cleveland Indians. He struggled in his first six starts, posting an 8.78 ERA and never pitching past the fifth inning, and was optioned to Durham to focus on improvement. There, Moore recorded a 3.57 ERA in 40 1/3 innings. On August 23, he struck out 16 Columbus Clippers batters, setting a franchise single-game record. He was called back up to the Rays on September 2, and finished the season with a 3–4 record and a 5.43 ERA in 12 starts and 63 innings.

Going into the 2016 MLB season, Moore was given the start for the Rays' exhibition game against the Cuban national team. The Rays won 4–1 in the first visit by an MLB team to Cuba since 1999, and Barack Obama, who was in attendance, was given one of Moore's gloves. He seemed to return to pre-surgery form in the early part of the season, striking out 27.1 percent of the batters he faced in April. His curveball, in particular, resulted in only five hits in 105 pitches. In 21 starts and 130 innings with the Rays in 2016, Moore was 7–7 with a 4.08 ERA.

=== San Francisco Giants ===
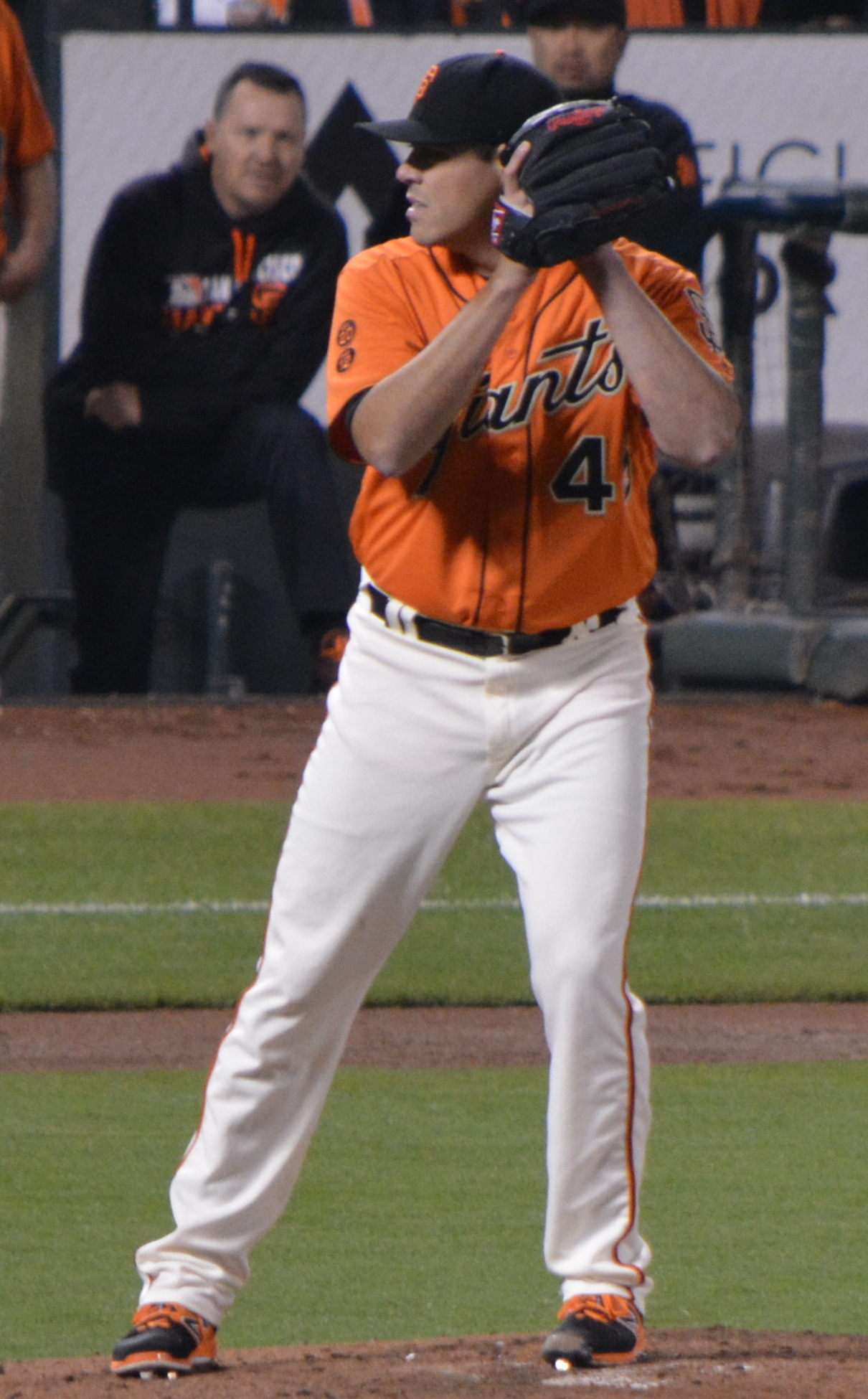
Moore pitching for the San Francisco Giants in 2016

On August 1, 2016, the Rays traded Moore to the San Francisco Giants in exchange for third baseman Matt Duffy and prospects Lucius Fox and Michael Santos. After reports emerged that Moore would be wearing No. 55 with the Giants, the number he had worn with the Rays & a number that had previously belonged to pitcher Tim Lincecum, Moore and the team had to quiet upset fans by saying that he would be No. 45 instead.

Moore debuted with the club on August 4, giving up two runs and six walks in six innings. The Giants won 3–2 against the Philadelphia Phillies in the 10th inning. That same month, on August 26, Moore came within one out of a no-hitter against the Los Angeles Dodgers, throwing seven strikeouts in 8 2/3 innings. Dodgers shortstop Corey Seager hit a single in the bottom of the ninth inning, and reliever Santiago Casilla came in to pitch the final out of the Giants' 4–0 win. It would have been the fifth season in a row that a member of the Giants' pitching rotation threw a no-hitter. In the postseason, Moore pitched eight innings in Game 4 of the 2016 National League Division Series (NLDS). Giants manager Bruce Bochy pulled Moore before the final inning, and the Chicago Cubs overcame a 5–2 deficit to win the game and the series. Moore finished 2016 with a cumulative 13–12 record, 4.08 ERA, and 178 strikeouts in 198 1/3 innings.

The 2017 season proved to be the worst of Moore's career. He went 6–15 with a career high 5.52 ERA in 174 1/3 innings and 31 starts, gave up 27 home runs, and led the National League in earned runs allowed with 107. In addition to having the worst ERA among MLB pitchers with at least 162 innings, left-handed batters hit a .373 batting average against him, the highest in the league, and his allowance of 80 extra-base hits was the second-highest in the NL. Moore attributed some of his troubles to an over-reliance on his cut fastball, which he threw more that season than his other pitches.

=== Texas Rangers ===
On December 15, 2017, the Giants traded Moore to the Texas Rangers in exchange for pitching prospects Sam Wolff and Israel Cruz. After feeling discomfort in his knee during spring training, Moore was placed on the 10-day disabled list on May 19, 2018. At the time, he was 1–5 with a 7.99 ERA in 10 games with the Rangers. He continued to struggle upon his return, carrying a 7.88 ERA by mid-June, and was moved to the bullpen to focus on improving his pitching technique. Prospect Yohander Mendez took Moore's place in the Rangers' starting rotation. He finished the season with a 3–8 record, a 6.79 ERA, and 86 strikeouts in 39 games and 102 innings with the Rangers. Moore's contract lapsed at the end of the 2018 season, leaving him a free agent.

=== Detroit Tigers ===
On December 4, 2018, the Detroit Tigers signed Moore to a one-year, $2.5 million contract in anticipation that he would follow Mike Fiers as a low-risk pitcher heading into a rebound season. On April 6, 2019, however, in only his second start of the season, Moore exited the mound three innings into a game against the Kansas City Royals, having sprained his right knee while attempting to field a bunt from Royals batter Billy Hamilton. He underwent meniscus surgery on April 14, and three days later, Tigers manager Ron Gardenhire announced that Moore would miss the rest of the MLB season. Prior to his injury, Moore pitched ten shutout innings for the Tigers.

=== Fukuoka SoftBank Hawks ===
On December 26, 2019, Moore signed a one-year, US$3.5 million (¥384,000,000) contract with the Fukuoka SoftBank Hawks of Nippon Professional Baseball (NPB), who were looking to rebuild their pitching rotation after losing Ariel Miranda and Robert Suárez. He was part of a six-man rotation for the Hawks, who won the Pacific League by 14 games. Moore pitched seven shutout innings, including five strikeouts, in Game 3 of the 2020 Japan Series, and the Hawks came within one out of a combined no-hitter in their 4–0 victory over the Yomiuri Giants. He finished the season with a 2.65 ERA in 15 starts with the Hawks. Because professional baseball returned to play in Japan earlier than in the US, Moore was able to pitch 85 innings in 2020, one more than MLB season leader Lance Lynn.

=== Philadelphia Phillies ===
On February 3, 2021, Moore signed a one-year, $3 million contract with the Phillies. He was the first left-handed starting pitcher to begin a season with the Phillies since Cole Hamels in 2015. In his first three starts with the Phillies, Moore pitched to a 9.82 ERA, with nine walks in only 11 innings. His poor performance, coupled with time spent on the COVID-19 protocol list, led to his removal from the starting rotation and replacement with veteran Phillies pitcher Vince Velasquez. Back spasms caused Moore to miss over a month of pitching, from May 20 to June 25, at which point he was reactivated to start the second game of a doubleheader against the Mets. On July 16, in the first game of a doubleheader against the Miami Marlins, Moore struck out nine batters in 4 1/3 innings; it was the first time that he had fanned that many since 2017, in a game against the Washington Nationals. Despite struggles in recent starts, Phillies manager Joe Girardi gave Moore a start against the Cincinnati Reds on August 11. Moore no-hit the Reds through 6 innings, throwing only 76 pitches while walking 2, but was removed in the 7th. The combined no-hit bid ended in the 8th when Archie Bradley gave up a solo homerun to Tyler Stephenson. Moore would however earn the win as the Phillies won the game 6–1. Moore finished the 2021 season with a 2–4 record and a 6.29 ERA.

=== Texas Rangers (second stint) ===
On March 14, 2022, Moore signed a minor league contract with the Rangers. He opened the 2022 season with the Round Rock Express, and Texas selected his contract to the active roster on April 16. Moore spent the 2022 season as a reliever and excelled in the new role, posting a 5–2 record with a 1.95 ERA and 83 strikeouts over 74 innings in 63 appearances.

=== Los Angeles Angels ===
On February 16, 2023, Moore signed a 1-year deal with the Los Angeles Angels worth $7.55 million. In 41 appearances for the Angels, he logged a 2.66 ERA with 49 strikeouts in 44.0 innings of work. He was placed on waivers by the team on August 29.

=== Cleveland Guardians ===
On August 31, 2023, the Cleveland Guardians claimed Moore off waivers. In 5 games for the Guardians, Moore registered a 3.86 ERA with 8 strikeouts in 4 2/3 innings of work.

=== Miami Marlins ===
On September 19, 2023, Moore was claimed off waivers by the Miami Marlins. He made three scoreless appearances for Miami before he was designated for assignment on October 1. On October 5, Moore elected free agency.

=== Los Angeles Angels (second stint) ===
On January 27, 2024, Moore signed a one-year, $9 million contract to return to the Los Angeles Angels. He made 51 appearances for the Angels, compiling a 5–3 record and 5.03 ERA with 41 strikeouts across 48 1/3 innings pitched. On August 27, Moore was placed on the injured list with left elbow soreness. He was transferred to the 60–day injured list on September 10, ending his season.

=== Boston Red Sox ===
On February 20, 2025, Moore signed a minor league contract with the Boston Red Sox. He was assigned to the Triple-A Worcester Red Sox to begin the year, but did not make an appearance due to arm soreness. Moore was released by the Red Sox organization on April 10.

=== Kansas City Royals ===
On June 20, 2026, Moore signed a minor league contract with the Kansas City Royals. In six games split between the rookie–level Arizona Complex League Royals and Triple–A Omaha Storm Chasers, he recorded a 2.70 ERA with 9 strikeouts across 6 2/3 innings pitched. Moore was released by the Royals organization on August 4. However two days later he re-signed with the Royals on a new minor league contract. He elected free agency on November 2.

== Pitcher profile ==
Early in his career, sports journalists predicted that Moore would become the Rays' ace because of his strong pitch repertoire and velocity. Baseball America and Keith Law of ESPN both ranked Moore second among all 2012 prospects, behind Bryce Harper, while MLB.com placed him in the third slot, behind Harper and Mike Trout. After returning from Tommy John surgery, however, Moore struggled with his pitch velocity and control, giving up large numbers of earned runs as he threw balls at hittable speeds and strike zone locations. His time in the NPB showed an improved performance, and Phillies manager Joe Girardi was keen to sign Moore in the hopes that he would add depth to the back end of the Phillies' starting rotation, serving as a player who has "pitched in tough situations" and could contend with aces Aaron Nola and Zack Wheeler.

Moore utilizes a four-pitch repertoire consisting of a 92 mph (148 km/h) four-seam fastball, an 83 mph (134 km/h) changeup, an 80 mph (130 km/h) curveball, and an 89 mph (143 km/h) cut fastball. He and reliever Dellin Betances are known for having a unique grip on their four-seam fastball, in which they tuck their thumb under the ball, which some sports journalists and fellow pitchers believe negatively impacts their pitch control. Moore's most consistent flaw has been his walk total; in 2013, his best season statistically, he walked 76 batters in 150 innings.

== Personal life ==
In the offseason, Moore lives with his wife Anna, a labor and delivery nurse, and their son in Scottsdale, Arizona. Their son was born in February 2019 in Tampa.

Moore is Catholic. He has a tattoo on his left shoulder of Saint Michael, his sponsor saint at his Confirmation.
