= Matt Duffy =

American baseball player (born 1991)

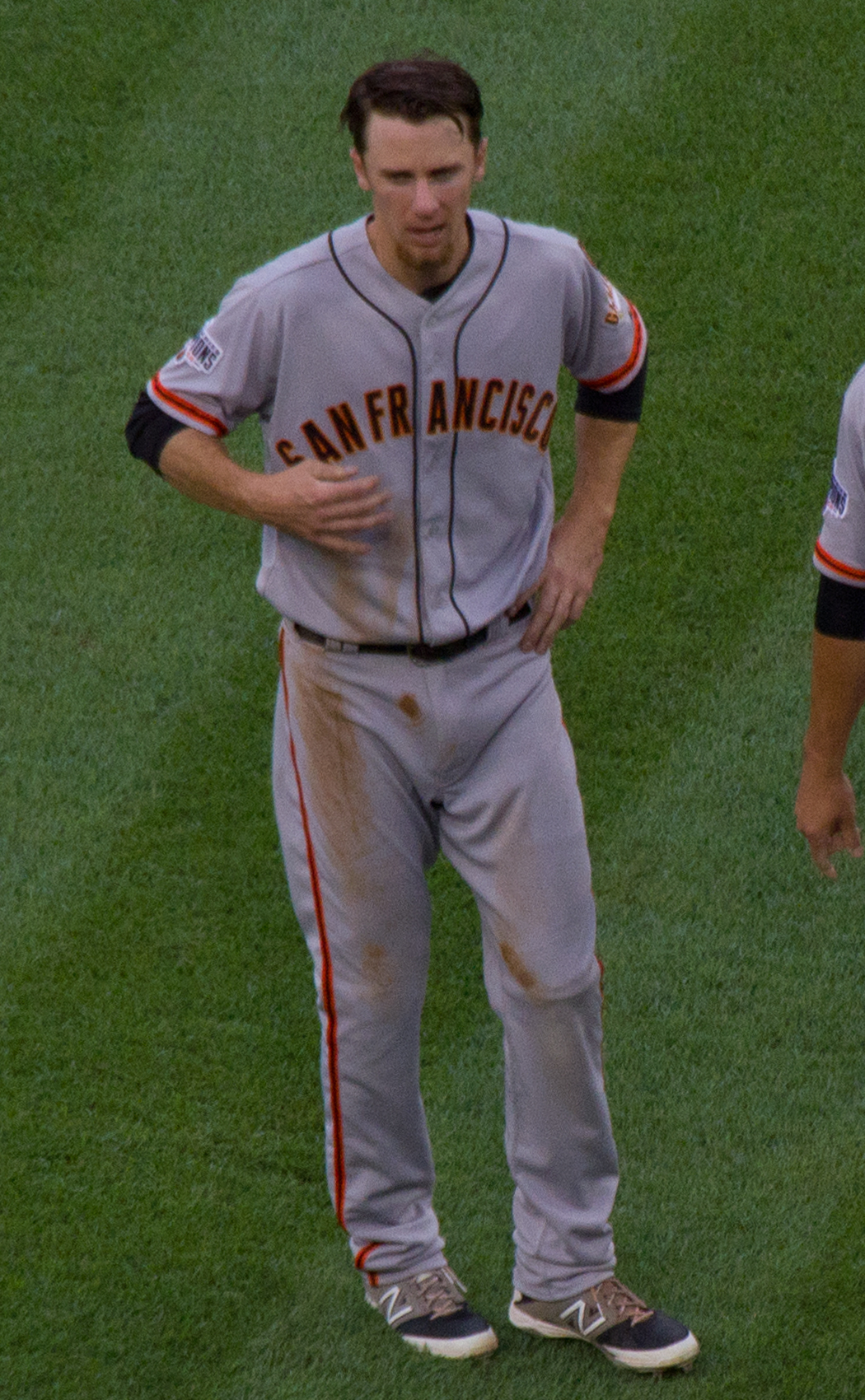
- Duffy with the San Francisco Giants
- Third baseman
- Born: January 15, 1991 (age 35); Long Beach, California, U.S.
- Batted: Right Threw: Right

MLB debut
- August 1, 2014, for the San Francisco Giants

Last MLB appearance
- September 28, 2024, for the Texas Rangers

MLB statistics
- Batting average: .277
- Home runs: 31
- Runs batted in: 231
- Stats at Baseball Reference

Teams
- San Francisco Giants (2014–2016); Tampa Bay Rays (2016, 2018–2019); Chicago Cubs (2021); Los Angeles Angels (2022); Kansas City Royals (2023); Texas Rangers (2024)

Career highlights and awards
- World Series champion (2014)

Matthew Michael Duffy (born January 15, 1991), nicknamed "Duffman", is an American former professional baseball third baseman. He played in Major League Baseball (MLB) for the San Francisco Giants, Tampa Bay Rays, Chicago Cubs, Los Angeles Angels, Kansas City Royals, and Texas Rangers. He played college baseball at Long Beach State.

== Early life ==
Born and raised in Long Beach, California, Duffy grew up a Los Angeles Angels fan. Duffy attended Lakewood High School in Lakewood, California, where he acquired the nickname "Duffman". At Lakewood High School, Duffy was a two-year letterwinner and led the team to a 23–12 record and a league championship in 2008. He was a two-time all-state selection and a two-time all-league pick. As a junior, Duffy achieved a batting average of .409 and 28 runs batted in. He hit .380 his senior year with 34 runs batted in and 3 home runs.

== College career ==
Duffy played college baseball at Long Beach State University from 2010 to 2012. During his 2010 season at Long Beach State, Duffy played in 30 games, starting 20 of them; averaged .244, had 86 at-bats, 8 runs, 21 hits, and 7 RBI. In the 2011 season, Duffy played in 55 games, starting 54 of them; averaged .266, had 214 at-bats, 22 runs, 57 hits, and 31 RBI. In those two seasons at Long Beach State, Duffy played in 85 games, starting 74 of them; averaged .260, had 300 at-bats, 30 runs, 78 hits, and 38 RBI. In 501 college at-bats, Matt Duffy hit .253 and had an on-base percentage of .305. Over those three seasons, Duffy recorded zero home runs, sixteen doubles, and one triple. He was kept in the lineup more for his defensive abilities.

In 2011, Duffy played in the Cape Cod League with the Orleans Firebirds, where he was named a league all-star and improved his swing by standing further back in the batter's box and incorporating a leg kick. In recent offseasons, he has occasionally worked with Firebirds' hitting coach Benny Craig. Craig urged Duffy to read Harvey Dorfman's The Mental Keys to Hitting, which Duffy says he has read at least 10 times, referring back to it during the occasional struggles that hitting is known for.

== Professional career ==
=== Draft and minor leagues ===
Duffy was drafted by the San Francisco Giants in the 18th round (568th overall) of the 2012 Major League Baseball draft, and signed with the Giants two days later. He began his professional baseball career in 2012 playing for the Salem-Keizer Volcanoes of the Low–A Northwest League, hitting .247 in 182 at-bats. In 2013, Duffy played for the Augusta GreenJackets of the Single–A South Atlantic League and the San Jose Giants of the High–A California League. In Augusta, he hit .307 with a 45/41 walk-to-strikeout ratio in 287 at-bats, and in San Jose, Duffy hit .292 in 106 at-bats. Duffy began 2014 with the Richmond Flying Squirrels of the Double-A Eastern League.

In his minor league career, Duffy played in 248 games, recording 942 at-bats, 149 runs, 286 hits, and 55 stolen bases. Duffy hit 13 home runs, had 135 runs batted in, walked 120 times, and struck out 145 times. In the minors, Duffy recorded a batting average of .304 and an on-base percentage of .387.

=== San Francisco Giants (2014–2016) ===
Duffy was called up to the Giants and played his first game in the major leagues on August 1, 2014. However, Duffy's MLB debut is officially recognized as May 22, 2014, as the Giants' game at the Colorado Rockies that day was suspended due to rain and resumed on September 1. Duffy entered the resumed game in the bottom of the sixth inning at second base, striking out in his only at-bat. In the 2014 regular season, Duffy played in 34 games and had 60 at bats. He recorded 16 hits and 5 runs while batting .267/.302/300. In Game 2 of the 2014 National League Championship Series, Duffy scored the tying run from second base on a wild pitch in the top of the ninth inning. He recorded a speed of 20.3 miles per hour when he raced from second to home. Duffy was also one of five rookies eligible to play against the Royals in the 2014 World Series. In the 2014 World Series, at age 23, he was the youngest player on the Giants' 25-man roster. By this point in his career, the knobs of his bats were decorated by cartoon "Duffman" decals.

Duffy was invited to his first spring training in 2015, where he hit .361 and earned the Barney Nugent Award, given to the player in his first Major League camp whose performance best exemplifies the spirit of the club. On April 5, Duffy was named to the Giants' opening-day 25-man roster. He hit his first major league home run on April 15 against the Colorado Rockies. On May 10, Duffy hit a walk-off, bases-loaded single in the bottom of the ninth inning to defeat the Miami Marlins 3–2. On May 12, Duffy set new career highs with 3 hits and 5 RBIs, helping the Giants to an 8–1 victory over the Houston Astros. Duffy was the first Giants rookie to collect 5 RBIs in a game since Buster Posey on July 7, 2010.

As a utility infielder, Duffy played all four infield positions during April and May, but he primarily played at third base as regular starter Casey McGehee struggled. On May 24, 2015, Duffy was awarded the starting third base job for the Giants after McGehee was designated for assignment. In June, Duffy batted .313 with 6 doubles, 3 triples, 5 home runs, and 15 RBIs, eventually working his way up to third in the batting order. On June 27 and 28, Duffy came up one hit short of hitting for the cycle in back-to-back games, needing a triple the first time and a single the next day. On July 10, Duffy had a career-high four hits in a 15–2 rout of the Philadelphia Phillies. The next night, Duffy hit a two-run, go-ahead triple in the sixth inning as the Giants came from behind to defeat the Phillies 8–5. For the third time, Duffy came up one hit shy of hitting for the cycle, needing a home run this time.

On July 25, Duffy knocked in the go-ahead run in a 2–1 victory over the Oakland Athletics. The following day, Duffy drove in three of the team's four runs as the Giants completed a three-game sweep of the Athletics. On August 4, Duffy tied his career high with four hits, including the game-tying RBI double in the top of the eighth inning as the Giants came from behind to defeat the Atlanta Braves 8–3. On August 14, Duffy hit his tenth home run of the season off Max Scherzer of the Washington Nationals, finishing 3-for-3 with a single, double, and home run, falling one hit short of the cycle for the fourth time.

On October 2, Duffy won the 2015 Willie Mac Award for the team's most inspirational player, the first rookie to win in the award's 35-year history. Duffy finished his first full major league season batting .295/.334/.428 with 12 home runs, 6 triples, 28 doubles, 169 hits, and 77 runs scored. Duffy's 77 runs batted in were the most by a Giants rookie since Dave Kingman drove in 83 in 1972. Duffy was a Gold Glove Award finalist and he finished second to Kris Bryant in the NL Rookie of the Year voting.

On May 7, 2016, Duffy hit a walk-off double in the bottom of the 13th inning to defeat the Colorado Rockies 2–1. On June 21, Duffy was placed on the disabled list with an Achilles injury. For the season with the Giants, he batted .253/.313/.358.

=== Tampa Bay Rays (2016–2019) ===
On August 1, 2016, the Giants traded Duffy to the Tampa Bay Rays along with Lucius Fox and Michael Santos for Matt Moore. Duffy made his Rays debut on August 12, he went 1–4 with a single. On September 7, the Rays shut Duffy down for the season to have surgery on his Achilles. With the Rays in 2016 he batted .276/.300/.355.

The original plan for the 2017 season was for Duffy to start the season at shortstop, assuming his Achilles would heal at the expected rate. But due to complications in the rehabilitation process, Duffy was placed on the 60-Day DL. Duffy came as close as a rehab stint to playing again in 2017, but more complications arose, drawing more setbacks. Duffy and the Rays organization expressed their frustrations with the rehabilitation process but still remained optimistic that he would appear in the 2017 season. Complications continued, however, and Duffy never made any appearance in a game in 2017. At the conclusion of the 2017 season, Duffy joined the instructional and winter league Rays' affiliates with hopes to build momentum into 2018.

Following a successful offseason, Duffy made the Rays 2018 opening day roster and became the first Ray to play third base since the trade of Evan Longoria. On April 17, Duffy was placed on the 10-day disabled list due to a right hamstring strain, he returned shortly after. On June 13, Duffy hit a walkoff single against the Toronto Blue Jays in a 1–0 victory. On September 20, Duffy possessed a .300 batting average and had a chance to become the first Ray to finish the season with a .300 average since 2011. Following a 1-13 skid, Duffy ended his first full season since 2015 slashing .294/.361/.366 with four home runs in 132 games and was considered a front runner for the comeback player of the year award. He had the lowest ISO (Isolated Power) of all MLB players in 2018, at .072.

Duffy endured another injury shortened season in 2019, playing only in 46 games for the Rays. Duffy was designated for assignment on November 20, 2019 and released on November 22.

=== Texas Rangers ===
On January 30, 2020, Duffy signed a minor league deal with the Texas Rangers. He did not appear in a game for the Rangers organization due to the cancellation of the minor league season because of the COVID-19 pandemic. Duffy was released by Texas on June 28.

=== New York Yankees ===
On June 28, 2020, Duffy signed a minor league contract with the New York Yankees. He did not appear in a game for the Yankees organization, also because of the cancellation of the minor league season, and became a free agent on November 2.

=== Chicago Cubs (2021) ===
On December 21, 2020, Duffy signed a minor league contract with the Chicago Cubs organization. On March 28, 2021, Duffy was selected to the 40-man roster. On June 29, Duffy was placed on the 60-day injured list with a lower back strain. He was activated off of the injured list on July 23.

=== Los Angeles Angels (2022) ===
On March 16, 2022, Duffy signed a one-year contract with the Los Angeles Angels worth $1.5 million. He was placed on the 60-day injured list on July 28 due to ongoing back spasms. Duffy played in 77 games for the Angels in 2022, batting .250/.308/.311 with 2 home runs and 16 RBI in 228 at-bats.

=== Kansas City Royals (2023) ===
On January 27, 2023, Duffy signed a minor league contract with the Kansas City Royals organization. On March 27, it was announced that Duffy would be added to the Opening Day roster. He became a free agent following the season.

=== Texas Rangers (second stint) ===
On January 25, 2024, Duffy signed a minor league contract with the Texas Rangers. He opted out of his contract and became a free agent on March 24. On March 28, Duffy re-signed with the Rangers on a new minor league contract. In 56 games for the Triple–A Round Rock Express, he batted .218/.296/.280 with two home runs and 16 RBI. On September 24, the Rangers selected Duffy's contract, adding him to their active roster. On October 31, he elected free agency.
