= Dunja Wolff =

German politician (born 1962)

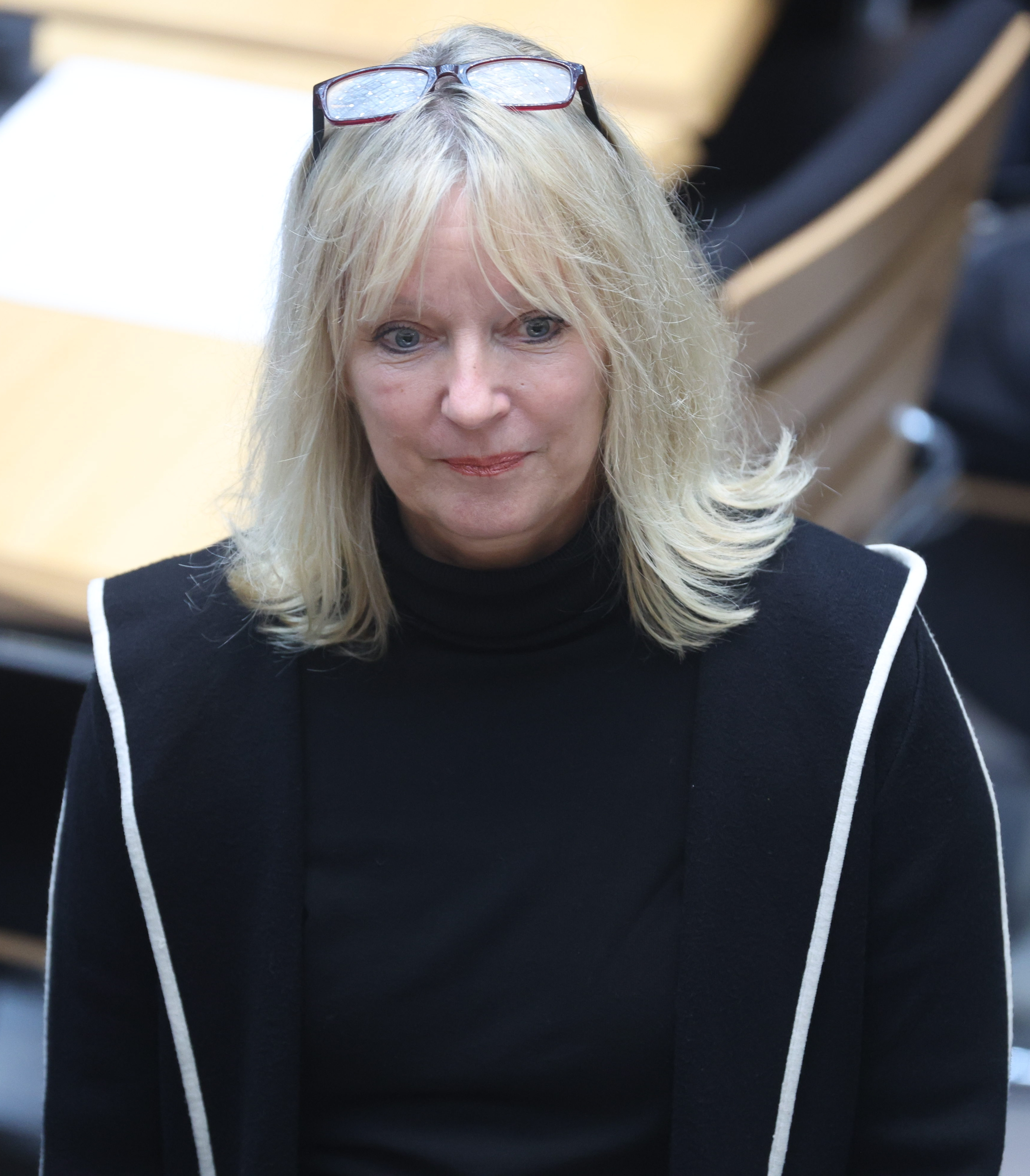
- Dunja Wolff in 2024

Member of the Abgeordnetenhaus of Berlin
- Incumbent
- Assumed office 2021

Personal details
- Born: 1962 (age 63–64) Germany
- Party: Social Democratic Party

Dunja Wolff (née Siehl; born 1962) is a German politician from the Social Democratic Party of Germany. She is also a musical performer and actress She has been a member of the Berlin House of Representatives since 2021.

== Biography ==
Dunja Wolff grew up in Brunsbüttel. Her first engagement was with the NDR television ballet, and she later performed in the musical Cats in Hamburg, among other productions. As the original cast member of Meg Giry, she starred in Phantom of the Opera in Hamburg. Her talent garnered critical acclaim, even appearing in The New York Times. She also worked behind the scenes, as the resident director at the Capitol Theater in Düsseldorf for the musical Grease. She also served as artistic director of the Colosseum Theater in Essen for the premiere of Joseph and the Amazing Technicolor Dreamcoat. From 1994 to 2012, she was responsible for Howard Carpendale's concert tours as a choreographer and staging supervisor. During this time, she took a break from the stage and managed textile shops in Portugal and Spain. Upon returning to Germany, she worked as a stage supervisor for Matthias Reim and Jennifer Rush. After the birth of her twins, she took on numerous volunteer projects, which paved the way for her entry into politics.

== Political career ==
Dunja Wolff was a member of the district assembly (Bezirksverordnetenversammlung) of Treptow-Köpenick for her party. In 2021, she won a seat in the Berlin House of Representatives for the Treptow-Köpenick 6 constituency. She was able to retain her seat in the House of Representatives in the repeat election in 2023.
