= Hans Wolff =

Hans Wolff may refer to:

- Hans Wolff (aviator) (1895–1918), World War I flying ace
- Hans Wolff (director) (1911–1979), German film editor and director
- Hans Helmut Wolff, 1910–1969), German Obersturmbannführer
- Hans Julius Wolff (1898–1976), German jurist
- Hans Julius Wolff (legal historian) (1902–1983), German legal historian
- Hans Walter Wolff (1911–1993), German Protestant theologian
- Hans Wolff (engineer) (1896–1976), German Doctor of Engineering

== See also ==
- Hans Wolf (b. 1940), American cyclist
