= Lucius Fox (baseball) =

Bahamian baseball player (born 1997)

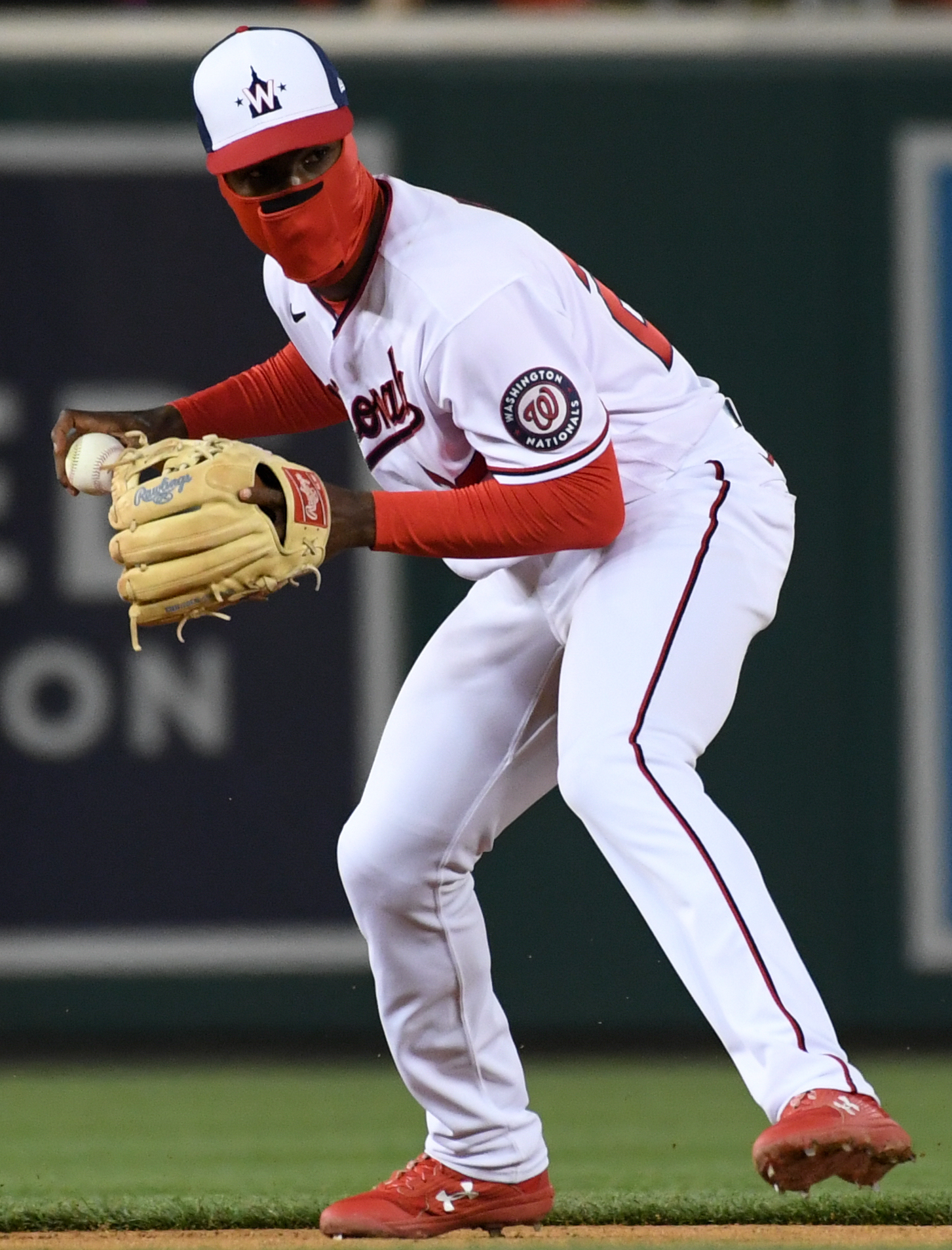
- Fox with the Washington Nationals in 2022
- Shortstop
- Born: July 2, 1997 (age 28); Nassau, Bahamas
- Batted: Switch Threw: Right

MLB debut
- April 10, 2022, for the Washington Nationals

Last MLB appearance
- May 1, 2022, for the Washington Nationals

MLB statistics
- Batting average: .080
- Home runs: 0
- Runs batted in: 2
- Stats at Baseball Reference

Teams
- Washington Nationals (2022)

Lucius Kadeem Fox Jr. (born July 2, 1997) is a Bahamian former professional baseball shortstop. He has previously played in Major League Baseball (MLB) for the Washington Nationals.

== Career ==
=== San Francisco Giants ===
Fox is from Nassau, Bahamas. He began playing baseball when he was seven years old, and moved to the United States at age 12 to continue his career. Fox attended American Heritage High School in Delray Beach, Florida. He moved back to the Bahamas in time to be declared an international free agent during the 2015 signing period. Fox signed with the San Francisco Giants, for a reported $6 million signing bonus. He spent his first professional season, in 2016, with the Augusta GreenJackets of the Single–A South Atlantic League, posting a .207 batting average and a .305 on-base percentage in 75 games played.

=== Tampa Bay Rays ===
On August 1, 2016, the Giants traded Fox, Matt Duffy, and Michael Santos to the Tampa Bay Rays for Matt Moore. He did not play for the Rays after the trade due to a bone bruise on his foot sustained while playing for Augusta. Fox began the 2017 season with the Bowling Green Hot Rods of the Single–A Midwest League. He represented the World Team in the 2017 All-Star Futures Game. After batting .278 with two home runs, 27 runs batted in (RBIs), and 27 stolen bases in 77 games for Bowling Green, the Rays promoted Fox to the Charlotte Stone Crabs of the High–A Florida State League, where he finished the season, batting .235 with one home run and 12 RBIs in 30 games. In 2018, he played for both Charlotte and the Montgomery Biscuits of the Double–A Southern League, slashing .268/.351/.341 with three home runs, 39 RBIs, and 29 stolen bases in 116 total games between the two teams.

He split the 2019 season between Montgomery and the Durham Bulls, hitting a combined .221/.331/.327/.658 with 3 home runs, 34 RBI, and 39 stolen bases. On November 20, 2019, the Rays added Fox to their 40-man roster to protect him from the Rule 5 draft. Fox did not play in a game in 2020 due to the cancellation of the minor league season because of the COVID-19 pandemic.

=== Kansas City Royals ===
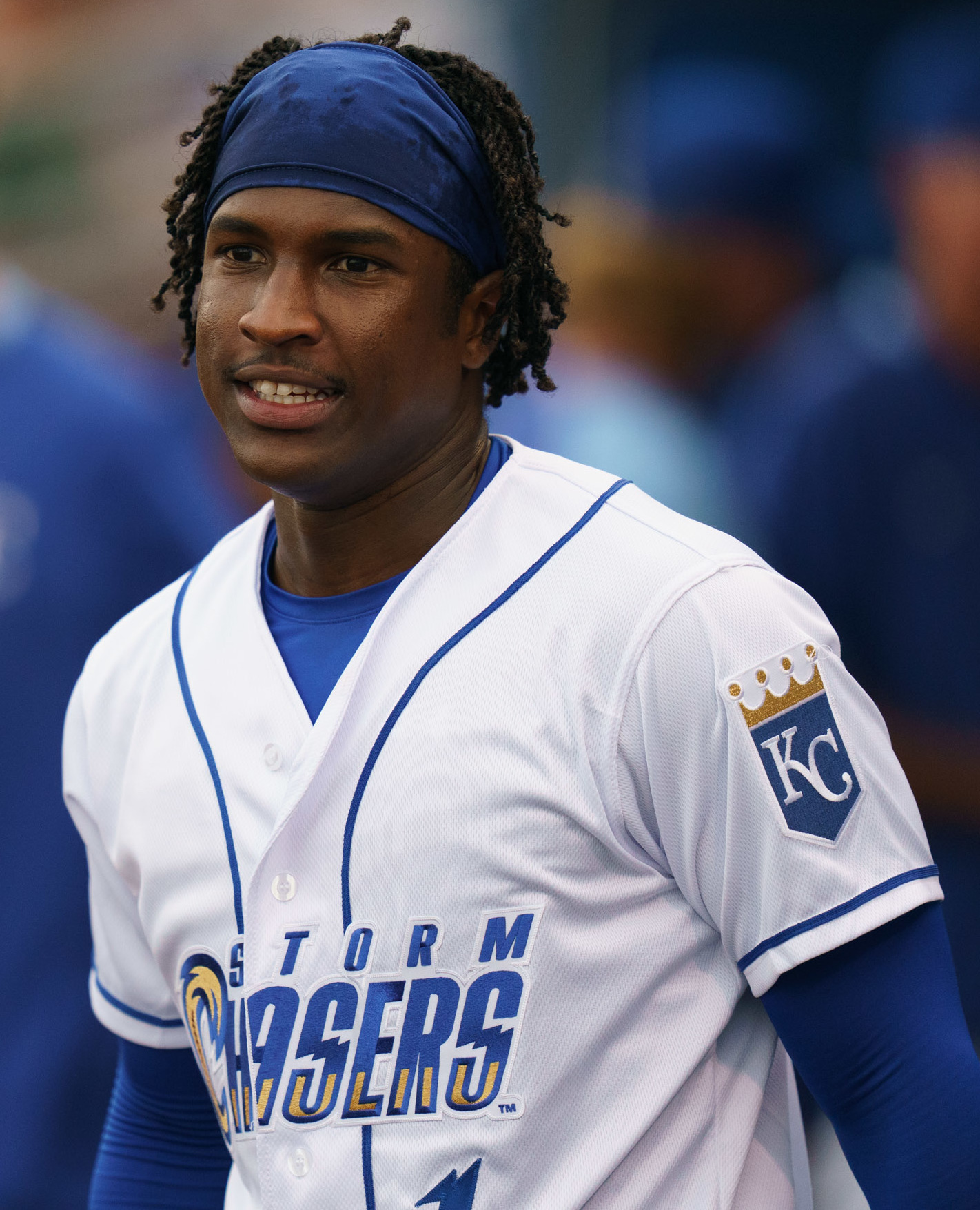
Fox with the Omaha Storm Chasers in 2021

On August 27, 2020, the Rays traded Fox to the Kansas City Royals in exchange for Brett Phillips. On July 30, 2021, Fox was promoted to the major leagues for the first time, but did not appear in the Royals' game against the Toronto Blue Jays and was optioned back to the Triple-A Omaha Storm Chasers the next day.

=== Washington Nationals ===
Fox was claimed first by the Baltimore Orioles on November 19, 2021, and then the Washington Nationals when the Orioles attempted to pass him through waivers eleven days later on November 30. Fox made the Nationals' Opening Day roster in 2022 and made his major league debut on April 10. In his debut game, he deployed a safety squeeze bunt to tie the game in the eighth inning, ultimately leading to a Nationals come-from-behind win. Fox recorded his first MLB hit on May 1, and was optioned to the Triple-A Rochester Red Wings on May 3. In 10 games for Washington, he went 2–for–25 (.080) with 2 RBI, 1 stolen base, and 1 walk. On December 13, Fox was designated for assignment by the Nationals. He cleared waivers and was sent outright to Triple–A Rochester on December 20.

In 2023, Fox played for the rookie–level Florida Complex League Nationals, High–A Wilmington Blue Rocks, Double–A Harrisburg Senators, and Triple–A Rochester. In 44 total games, he batted a combined .229/.306/.313 with 3 home runs and 10 RBI. On September 12, 2023, Fox was released by the Nationals organization.

=== Chicago White Sox ===
On February 8, 2024, Fox signed a minor league contract with the Chicago White Sox. He was released on March 28.

== See also ==
- List of Major League Baseball players from the Bahamas
