= Brett Phillips =

American baseball player (born 1994)

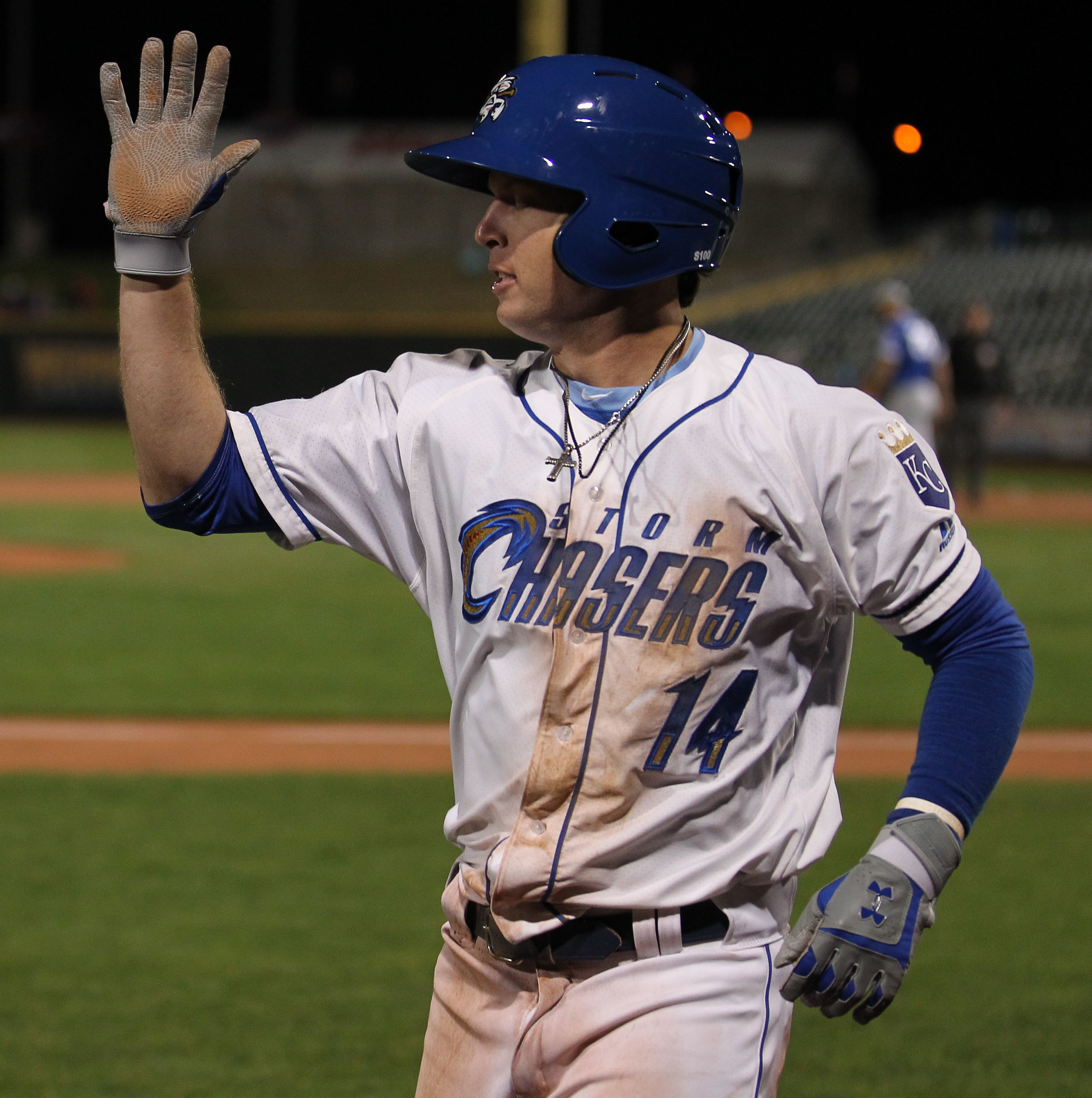
- Phillips with the Omaha Storm Chasers in 2019
- Outfielder
- Born: May 30, 1994 (age 32); Seminole, Florida, U.S.
- Batted: Left Threw: Right

MLB debut
- June 5, 2017, for the Milwaukee Brewers

Last MLB appearance
- October 1, 2023, for the Los Angeles Angels

MLB statistics
- Batting average: .187
- Home runs: 31
- Runs batted in: 99
- Stats at Baseball Reference

Teams
- Milwaukee Brewers (2017–2018); Kansas City Royals (2018–2020); Tampa Bay Rays (2020–2022); Baltimore Orioles (2022); Los Angeles Angels (2023)
Medals
Men's baseball
Representing United States
WBSC Premier12
Silver medal – second place	2015 Tokyo	Team

Brett Maverick Phillips (born May 30, 1994) is an American former professional baseball outfielder. He played in Major League Baseball (MLB) for the Milwaukee Brewers, Kansas City Royals, Tampa Bay Rays, Baltimore Orioles, and Los Angeles Angels. Currently he serves in a fan engagement role for the Rays.

== Early life ==
Phillips attended Seminole High School in Seminole, Florida. He graduated in 2012.

== Professional career ==
=== Houston Astros ===
The Houston Astros selected Phillips in the sixth round, with the 189th overall pick of the 2012 Major League Baseball draft. He signed with the Astros rather than play college baseball at North Carolina State University.

In 2012, Phillips made his professional debut with the Gulf Coast Astros of the Rookie-level Gulf Coast League, hitting .251 in 54 games. He played in 41 games in 2013 between the Greeneville Astros of the Rookie-level Appalachian League and Quad Cities River Bandits of the Single-A Midwest League, hitting .242/.347/.331 in 157 at-bats.

Phillips started 2014 back with Quad Cities and was promoted to the Lancaster JetHawks of the High–A California League after posting a .883 on-base plus slugging (OPS) and 13 home runs in 103 games. He finished the year hitting .310/.375/.529 with 17 home runs and was named the Astros' Minor League Player of the Year after the season.

=== Milwaukee Brewers ===
On July 30, 2015, the Astros traded Phillips, Domingo Santana, Josh Hader, and Adrian Houser to the Milwaukee Brewers in exchange for Carlos Gómez and Mike Fiers. He finished the season with the Biloxi Shuckers of the Double–A Southern League. The Brewers invited Phillips to spring training, where he was to compete to be the Brewers center fielder for the 2016 season. However, he strained an oblique muscle and was sent to minor league camp before he could appear in a game. The Brewers opted to assign Phillips to Biloxi to start the 2016 season. The Brewers added him to their 40-man roster after the season. He started the 2017 season with the Colorado Springs Sky Sox of the Triple–A Pacific Coast League.

On June 5, 2017, Phillips was called up to the Brewers to make his MLB debut. In limited action, he hit .276 with four homers and 12 RBI. On June 7, he had a 104 miles per hour (167 km/h) throw on an outfield assist, throwing out David Freese out at home plate. That was the fastest throw by an outfielder that season.

Phillips began the 2018 season in the minors and only saw 24 plate appearances with the Brewers, hitting .182 with 11 strikeouts, a .523 OPS and four RBI.

=== Kansas City Royals ===
On July 27, 2018, Phillips and reliever Jorge López were traded to the Kansas City Royals in exchange for infielder Mike Moustakas. In 36 appearances down the stretch, Phillips batted .188/.252/.313 with two home runs, seven RBI, and one stolen base.

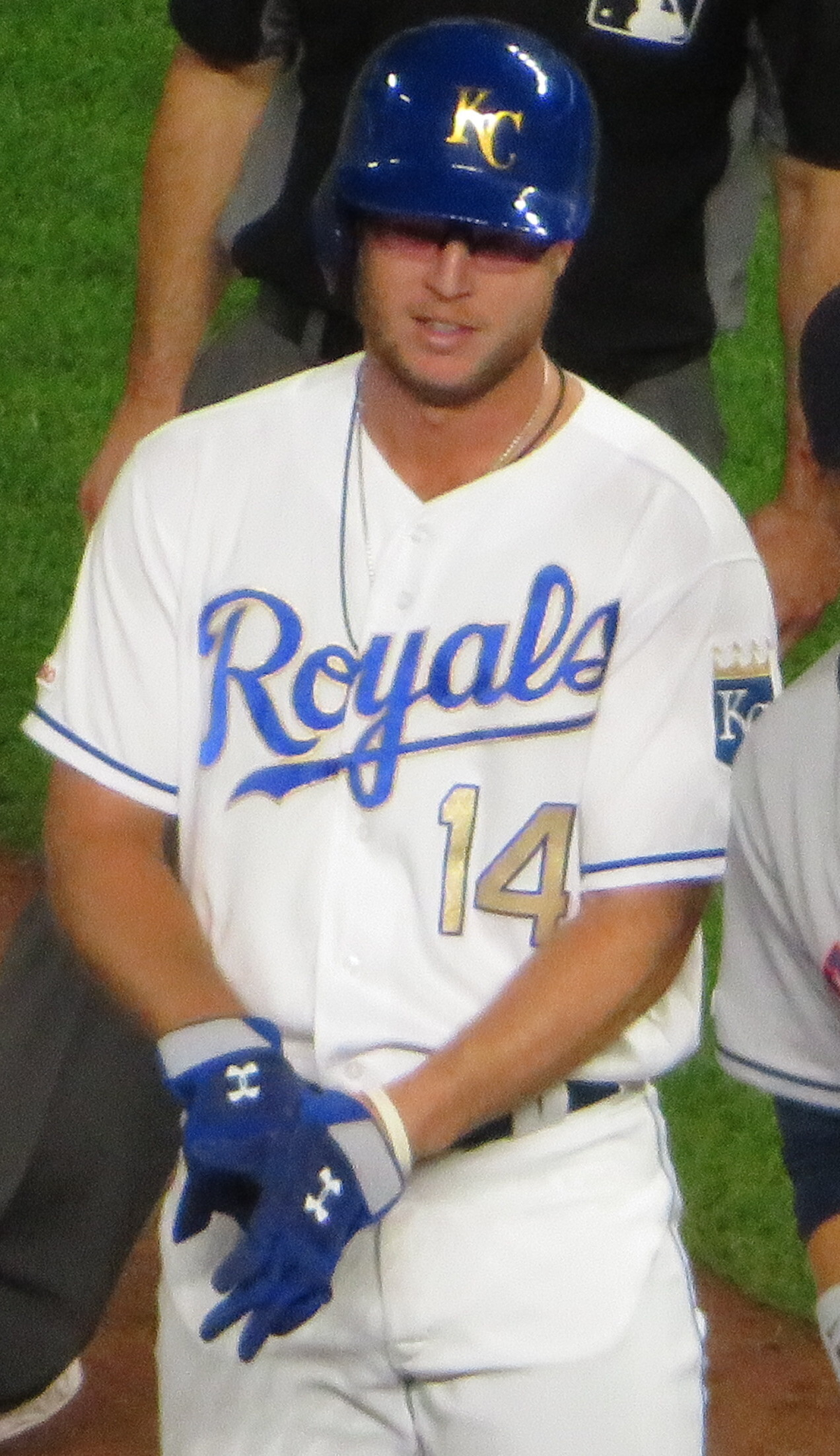
Phillips with the Royals in 2019

In 2019, Phillips slashed .138/.247/.262 with two home runs and six RBI in 30 games. He made 18 appearances for Kansas City during the 2020 campaign, hitting .226/.294/.387 with one home run, two RBI, and three stolen bases.

=== Tampa Bay Rays ===
On August 27, 2020, the Royals traded Phillips to the Tampa Bay Rays in exchange for Lucius Fox. Phillips was activated on September 4, making his Rays debut as a pinch-runner in a 5–4 victory over the Miami Marlins. On October 24, in Game 4 of the 2020 World Series against the Los Angeles Dodgers, Phillips recorded his first career postseason hit, a walk-off single in the bottom of the ninth inning that yielded two runs (one coming on an error), giving the Rays an 8–7 win and tying the series at two games apiece. He became the first player since Kirk Gibson in 1988 to have a walk-off hit with two outs with his team trailing in the World Series. Despite the heroic feat by Phillips, the Rays lost the next two games to the Dodgers, ending the team's second bid for a World Series title.

On July 2, 2021, Phillips made his first career pitching appearance in a blowout loss against the Toronto Blue Jays, and pitched one inning, allowing one run on an RBI single to Santiago Espinal. Between July 29 and August 11, Phillips hit three grand slams in only 19 plate appearances, second only to Jim Northrup who did so in 14 appearances in 1968. Then on August 16, he hit an inside-the-park home run, and the combination of three slams plus one inside-the-park home run in only 19 days broke a record held by Babe Ruth, who accomplished the same feat in 36 days in 1929.

In 2022, in 184 at-bats for Tampa Bay, Phillips slashed .147/.225/.250 with five home runs, 14 RBI, and seven stolen bases. He was designated for assignment on August 1, 2022, following the Rays' trade acquisition of José Siri from the Houston Astros.

=== Baltimore Orioles ===
Phillips was traded to the Baltimore Orioles for cash at the trade deadline one day later, on August 2, 2022. The back of his Orioles jersey featured his surname above uniform number 66, a word play on the Phillips 66 company name.

In 2022 for Baltimore, after going 2-for-17 with two doubles (.118/.118/.235) and nine strikeouts, he was replaced by Kyle Stowers on the team's 40-man roster and designated for assignment 17 days later on August 19. He cleared waivers and was outrighted to the Norfolk Tides three days later on August 22. He would've forfeited more than $300,000 remaining on his $1.4 million salary for 2022 had he elected to become a free agent. He elected free agency on October 6.

=== Los Angeles Angels ===
On January 9, 2023, the Los Angeles Angels signed Phillips to a one-year, $1.2 million contract. He appeared in 20 games for the Angels, going 1-for-13 (.077) with 3 walks and 2 RBI. Phillips was designated for assignment on May 20, when Jared Walsh was activated from the injured list. He cleared waivers and was sent outright to the Triple-A Salt Lake Bees on May 24. On September 6, Phillips was selected back to the major league roster.

In 39 games for the Angels, he slashed .175/.268/.333 with 3 home runs, 6 RBI, and 3 stolen bases, with 36 strikeouts in 71 plate appearances. Following the season on October 16, Phillips was removed from the 40–man roster and sent outright to Triple-A Salt Lake. However, he subsequently rejected the assignment and elected free agency.

=== Chicago White Sox ===
On January 4, 2024, Phillips signed a minor league contract with the Chicago White Sox. In 17 games for the Triple-A Charlotte Knights, he hit .120/.228/.280 with one home run, seven RBI, and three stolen bases. The White Sox released Phillips on May 4.

=== New York Yankees ===
After being released by the White Sox, Phillips began working to transition into a career as a pitcher, training with former MLB pitcher Sean Gallagher. On July 30, 2024, Phillips signed a minor league contract with the New York Yankees. He was signed as a pitcher after striking out the side for the GPS Legends in the National Baseball Congress World Series. He was assigned to the Tampa Tarpons, the Yankees' Single-A affiliate. He pitched in one game, allowing five runs and getting no outs, walking two batters, hitting another, and committing a throwing error on a pickoff attempt. Phillips elected free agency following the season on November 4.

=== Kane County Cougars ===
On March 25, 2025, Phillips signed with the Piratas de Campeche of the Mexican League. However, on April 30, Phillips signed with the Cleburne Railroaders of the American Association of Professional Baseball. He did not appear for the team before being released on May 7. On May 9, Phillips signed with the Kane County Cougars. In six appearances for the Cougars, Phillips went 0-for-8 with three walks; in four outings as a pitcher, he struggled to a 33.00 ERA with two strikeouts over three innings pitched.

On May 31, the Cougars hired Phillips to become their hitting coach, placing him on the inactive list. He was released from the club as a player on June 2.

On October 5, Phillips announced his official retirement from playing.

== Post Playing Career ==
Before the 2026 season, Phillips was announced to be returning to the Rays in a new fan ambassador role working in the front office

== Personal life ==
Phillips is married to Brianna Hillman Phillips, the daughter of former Kansas City Royals manager Trey Hillman. They live in Largo, Florida.

Phillips is a Christian.

== See also ==
- Houston Astros award winners and league leaders
