= List of Major League Baseball players from the Bahamas =

This is a list of the nine baseball players from the Bahamas who played in Major League Baseball between 1932 and 2022.

== Players ==
| Name | Debut | Final Game | Position | Teams | Ref |
|---|---|---|---|---|---|
| Ormond Sampson | 1932 | 1938 | Infielder | Atlanta Black Crackers (1932); Chicago American Giants (1938) | |
| Andre Rodgers | April 16, 1957 | September 30, 1967 | Infielder | New York / San Francisco Giants (1957–1960); Chicago Cubs (1961–1964); Pittsburgh Pirates (1965–1967) | |
| Tony Curry | April 12, 1960 | July 16, 1966 | Outfielder | Philadelphia Phillies (1960–1961); Cleveland Indians (1966) | |
| Ed Armbrister | August 31, 1973 | October 2, 1977 | Outfielder | Cincinnati Reds (1973–1977) | |
| Wenty Ford | September 10, 1973 | September 30, 1973 | Pitcher | Atlanta Braves (1973) | |
| Wil Culmer | April 12, 1983 | May 1, 1983 | Outfielder/Designated hitter | Cleveland Indians (1983) | |
| Antoan Richardson | September 4, 2011 | September 28, 2014 | Outfielder | Atlanta Braves (2011); New York Yankees (2014) | |
| Jazz Chisholm Jr. | September 1, 2020 | | Shortstop | Miami Marlins (2020–2024); New York Yankees (2024-present) | |
| Lucius Fox | April 10, 2022 | May 1, 2022 | Shortstop | Washington Nationals (2022) | |
