= A Requiem for Syrian Refugees =

2014 documentary film

- Theatrical poster of A Requiem for Syrian Refugees
- Directed by: Richard Wolf
- Release date: October 17, 2014
- Running time: 101 mins
- Languages: Kurdish, English

A Requiem for Syrian Refugees is a 2014 documentary film directed by Richard Wolf.

== Background ==
A Requiem for Syrian Refugees was shot in Northern Iraq by Richard Wolf, who travelled to the Kawergosk Refugee Camp, to investigate the state of affairs and living of the displaced people by the civil disorder in the Territory of the Islamic State.

== Reception ==
A Requiem for Syrian Refugees, reviewed by film historian, Roy Grundmann for Cinéaste, commented that "the synergized aestheticization of its subject moves the film closer to a Hollywoodized Gesamtkunstwerk of the ilk of Schindler's List." Anita Gates of New York Times lauded Robert's directing and criticised the film "as a powerfully direct as it is unfortunately heavy-handed, with lingering black-and-white close-ups of barbed wire and children's wide eyes." She acknowledged that the film is good generally when she wrote, "but the film is eloquent, too, thanks to the voices of the refugees themselves." Diana Clarke of The Village Voice expressed a tone of praise and sadness saying that Richard Wolf "gives his subjects, Syrians living in a refugee camp in northern Iraq, a platform to tell their truths. The result is urgent, deeply painful yet lovely in its aesthetics."
