= Hellmuth Wolff =

Hellmuth Wolff may refer to:

- Hellmuth Wolff (organ builder) (1937–2013), Canadian organ builder
- Hellmuth Christian Wolff (1906–1988), German composer and musicologist
