= Richard Wolf (director) =

Brazilian film director

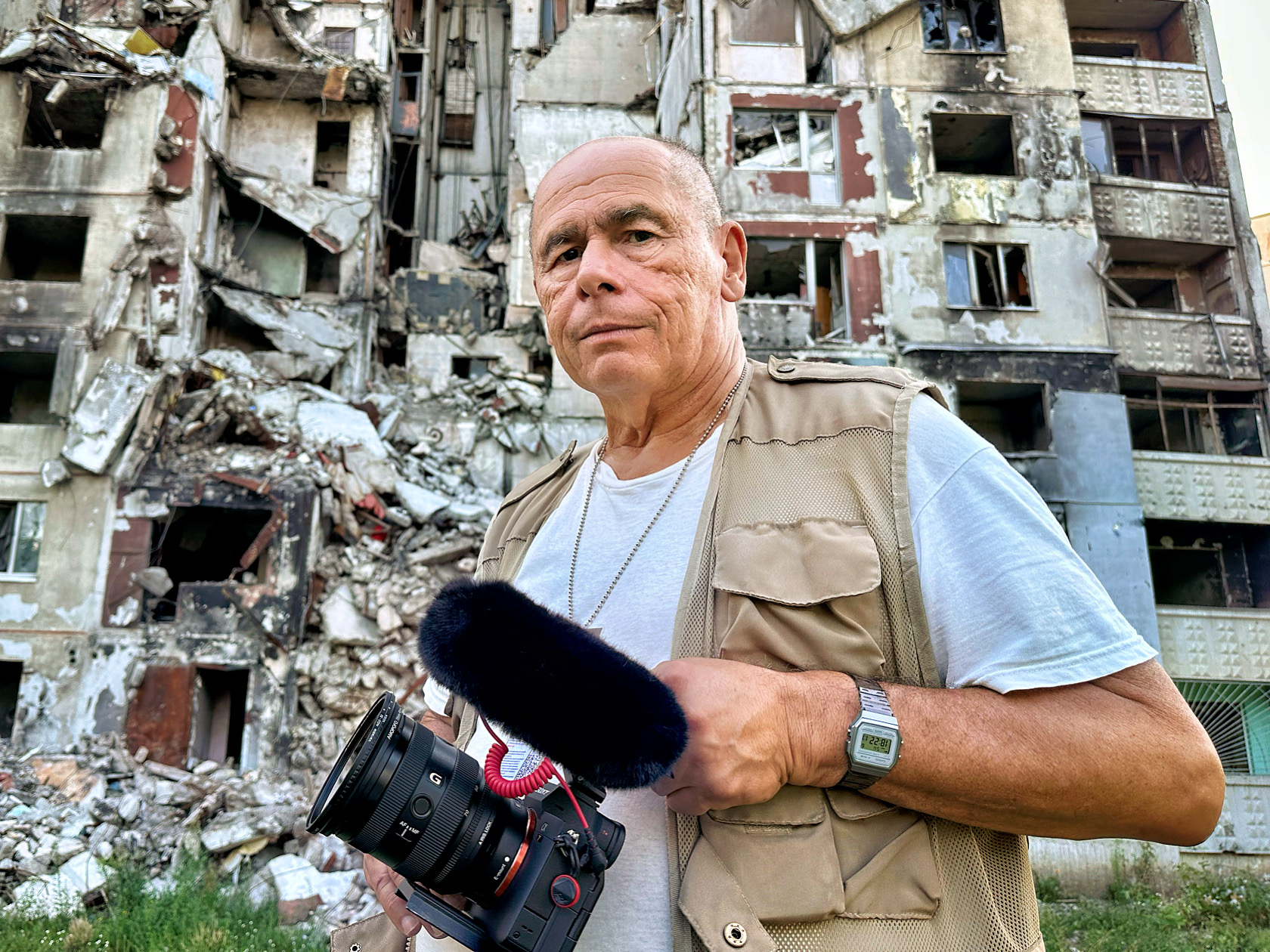
- Born: April 1956 (age 69); Brazil American
- Education: Columbia University (M.A.); New School University (Ph.D.)
- Occupation: Documentary film director
- Years active: 1997-present
- Website: lobodocs.com

Richard Wolf (born Ricardo Lobo; 1956) is a Brazilian-American documentary film director. He directed the documentary films Light Within the Cracks and A Requiem for Syrian Refugees.

== Career ==
Wolf worked under the name Ricardo Lobo in Brazil. He produced special reports for Documento Especial and directed documentaries for TV Cultura, including De Volta para Casa which won the Ayrton Senna Journalism Award and TV Cultura's O Grito da Periferia (1999).

Lobo changed his name to Richard Wolf and moved to the United States, where he directed documentaries such as the 2001 film Behind the Veil, a film investigating women's underground resistance against fundamentalism in Taliban-controlled Afghanistan.

Wolf's 2003 film Women of the Sand: Nomad Islamic Women, focused on women in the Mauritanian desert, is part of the Museum of Modern Art's permanent collection.

Wolf also directed A Requiem for Syrian Refugees, a film investigating the Syrian refugee camp known as Kawergosk, which was released theatrically in 2014.

In 2020, Wolf released the documentary Light Within the Cracks, which profiled people in the largest urban slum in Africa in Nairobi, Kenya. The film was an official selection at the New York International Reel Film Festival and the Manhattan Film Festival.

In 2023, Wolf released Ukraine 5.6, a documentary focused on the trauma of Ukraine war survivors.

Wolf has also made films for the United Nations, including a documentary on the UN Security Council, as well as reports on AIDS and environmental community activities.

== Filmography ==
Year	Title	Ref
1997	Rebel Mexico	
1997	Crianças de Fibra	
1998	De Volta para Casa	
1999	O Grito da Periferia	
2001	Behind the Veil: Afghan Women under Fundamentalism	
2003	Women of the Sand: Nomad Islamic Women	
2004	Beyond the Headlines: The UN Security Council	
2008	Dishonourable Killings	
2013	Rue Moufettard	
2014	A Requiem for Syrian Refugees	
2018	The Antechamber of Hell	
2019	Kibera: The Big Build	
2020	Light Within the Cracks	
2023	Ukraine 5.6	
