= Julius Wolff =

Julius Wolff may refer to:

- Julius Wolff (mathematician) (1882–1945), Dutch mathematician
- Julius Wolff (politician) (1818–1879), American politician
- Julius Wolff (surgeon) (1836–1902), German surgeon
- Julius Wolff (writer) (1834–1910), German writer
