= Rich Wolfe =

American sportswriter (died 2020)

Rich Wolfe (died August 31, 2020) was an American sports writer and marketer who wrote over fifty books, mainly about unique team's fan cultures. As marketing manager for the Continental Basketball Association's team Quad City Thunder, he produced memorable halftime shows which included chainsaw juggling, a Jackson Five puppet show and Moore's Mess of Mutts.

Wolfe later went on to be the owner of the Cedar Rapids Sharpshooters, a member of the Global Basketball Association for the 1992–3 season. He lost the franchise in 1992 for "financial reasons" and later sued the Five Seasons Center and the new owners for slander.

Wolfe grew up in Lost Nation, Iowa and played basketball and baseball at Notre Dame. He was inducted as one of Leahy's Lads (playing under coach Frank Leahy) in 2006. He was a sports enthusiast and trivia buff and often said he was the only person who had appeared on both Jeopardy! and ESPN's Two Minute Drill. Wolfe wrote all of his books without the aid of a computer and sold them mostly direct via mail order.
