= Jonathan Wolff =

Jonathan Wolff may refer to:

- Jonathan Wolff (philosopher) (born 1959), British political philosopher
- Jonathan Wolff (musician) (born 1958), American composer of the Seinfeld TV theme

== See also ==
- Jon A. Wolff (1956–2020), American geneticist
- John Wolff (1906–2005), American legal scholar
- Jonathan Wolfe (Robotech), fictional character
- Jonathan Wolfe, former bassist with Falling in Reverse
