= Werner Wolff =

Werner Wolff may refer to:

- Werner Wolff (musician) (1883–1961), Hamburg Opera conductor and Chattanooga Opera founder
- Werner Wolff (psychologist), taught at Bard College from 1942 to 1957
- Werner Wolff (SS officer), German officer and Knight's Cross of the Iron Cross recipient
- Werner Wolff (photographer) (1911–2002), German-born American photojournalist
