= Treptow-Köpenick 6 =

State electoral district of Germany

- Electoral district for the Berlin House of Representatives
- Treptow-Köpenick 6 in 2023
- District: Treptow-Köpenick
- Electorate: 29,701 (2026)

Current electoral district
- Party: AfD
- Member: Martin Trefzer

Treptow-Köpenick 6 is an electoral constituency (German: Wahlkreis) represented in the House of Representatives of Berlin. It elects one member via first-past-the-post voting.

== Geography ==
In 2023, the constituency comprised the districts of Friedrichshagen, Rahnsdorf/Hessenwinkel, and the north of Köpenick. It is entirely within the borough of Treptow-Köpenick.

There were 29,701 eligible voters in 2026.

== Members ==
Election	Member	Party	%
1995	Elke Baum	PDS	30.9
1999	Jochen Querengässer	PDS	37.7
2001	Norbert Pewestorff	PDS	38.0
2006	Renate Harant	SPD	35.3
2011	Renate Harant	SPD	31.0
2016	Carsten Schatz	The Left	25.5
2021	Dunja Wolff	SPD	22.0
2023	Maik Penn	CDU	31.6
2026	Martin Trefzer	AfD	29.7

== Election results ==
=== 2026 election ===
State election (2026): Treptow-Köpenick 6
Notes:	Blue background denotes the winner of the electorate vote. Pink background denotes a candidate elected from their party list. Yellow background denotes an electorate win by a list member, or other incumbent. A ✓ or ✗ denotes status of any incumbent, win or lose respectively.						
Party	Candidate	Votes	%	±%	Party votes	%	±%
AfD	Martin Trefzer	6,500	29.7	▲11.0	6,583	29.9	▲11.7
Left	Eda Terkan	5,112	23.4	▲8.3	4,916	22.3	▲7.3
CDU	Martin Sattelkau	3,894	17.8	▼10.7	3,385	15.4	▼13.0
SPD	Sara Rüdiger	2,164	9.9	▼12.3	2,252	10.2	▼9.1
BSW	Alina-Viviane Lindemann	1,552	7.1		1,659	7.5	
Greens	Claudia Schlaak	1,320	6.0	▼0.5	1,445	6.6	Steady
Tierschutzpartei					552	2.5	Steady
FDP	Stefan Förster	513	2.3	▼1.1	458	2.1	▼2.1
PARTEI	Marek Bauer	478	2.2	Steady	228	1.0	▼0.5
Volt	Philipp Hanschke	318	1.5		295	1.3	▲0.9
PdF					100	0.5	
HEIMAT					46	0.2	Steady
DKP					38	0.2	Steady
ÖDP					29	0.1	▲0.1
du.					12	0.1	
SGP					8	0.0	
Informal votes		577			422		
Total valid votes		21,851			22,006		
Turnout		22,428	75.5	▲12.8			
AfD gain from CDU	Majority	1,388	6.3				

=== 2023 repeat election ===
Changes denoted below for the 2023 election are compared to the 2016 election, as the 2021 election was declared invalid.

State election (2023): Treptow-Köpenick 6
Notes:	Blue background denotes the winner of the electorate vote. Pink background denotes a candidate elected from their party list. Yellow background denotes an electorate win by a list member, or other incumbent. A ✓ or ✗ denotes status of any incumbent, win or lose respectively.						
Party	Candidate	Votes	%	±%	Party votes	%	±%
CDU	Maik Penn	7,306	31.6	▲14.2	6,722	29.0	▲14.9
SPD	Dunja Wolff	4,268	18.4	▼6.8	4,114	17.8	▼3.1
Left	Carsten Schatz	4,158	18.0	▼7.6	3,748	16.2	▼7.5
AfD	Georg Pazderski	2,768	12.0	▼7.0	2,829	12.2	▼6.4
Greens	Jacob Zellmer	2,700	11.7	▲1.8	2,800	12.1	▲2.3
FDP	Stefan Förster	750	3.2		831	3.6	▼1.2
Tierschutzpartei	Anika Hansen	698	3.0		495	2.1	▲0.5
PARTEI					369	1.6	▼0.1
Volt					143	0.6	
FW	Michael Knape	229	1.0		116	0.5	
dieBasis	Annemarie Kloß-Pattschull	209	0.9		139	0.6	
The Grays					138	0.6	
Gray Panthers					106	0.5	▼0.6
DKP					71	0.3	Steady
Verjüngungsforschung					64	0.3	▼0.2
Klimaliste					59	0.3	
Pirates					56	0.2	▼1.1
Mieterpartei					55	0.2	
Team Todenhöfer					52	0.2	
ÖDP					42	0.2	
Bildet Berlin!					33	0.1	
Humanists					32	0.1	
NPD	Philipp Lindlahr	28	0.1	▼0.6	26	0.1	▼0.5
du.					26	0.1	
LKR	Judith Burmeister	27	0.1		25	0.1	▼0.4
BüSo					17	0.1	▼0.1
SGP					17	0.1	Steady
The Pinks/Alliance 21					17	0.1	
Bergpartei, die ÜberPartei					11	0.0	
Informal votes		214			193		
Total valid votes		23,141			23,153		
Turnout		23,380	69.6	▼3.4			
CDU gain from Left	Majority	3,038	13.2				

=== 2021 election (annulled) ===
The election in 2021 was annulled and rerun in 2023.

State election (2021): Treptow-Köpenick 1
Notes:	Blue background denotes the winner of the electorate vote. Pink background denotes a candidate elected from their party list. Yellow background denotes an electorate win by a list member, or other incumbent. A ✓ or ✗ denotes status of any incumbent, win or lose respectively.						
Party	Candidate	Votes	%	±%	Party votes	%	±%
Left	✓ Katalin Gennburg	7,005	26.2	▼0.1	6,205	23.1	▼2.5
SPD	Alexander Freier-Winterwerb	5,339	20.0	▼3.4	5,019	18.7	▼0.9
Greens	Catrin Wahlen	5,326	19.9	▲4.5	5,537	20.6	▲5.0
CDU	Dustin Hoffmann	2,796	10.5	▲0.4	2,636	9.8	▲0.1
AfD	Andrea Lorenz	2,291	8.6	▼6.8	2,285	8.5	▼6.3
FDP	Vincent Westphal	1,191	4.5	▲1.9	1,278	4.8	▲1.8
Tierschutzpartei	Carolin Pleier	1,041	3.9		739	2.8	▲0.6
PARTEI	Dewitt Hnida	834	3.1	▼0.8	758	2.8	▼0.4
dieBasis	Stephan Haube	439	1.6		369	1.4	
FW	Robert Soyka	338	1.3		254	0.9	
Volt					252	0.9	
Klimaliste					223	0.8	
Team Todenhöfer					174	0.6	
The Grays					171	0.6	
APT					131	0.5	
Gray Panthers					124	0.5	▼0.5
Pirates					118	0.4	▼2.2
Verjüngungsforschung					82	0.3	▼0.2
Humanists					79	0.3	
du.					69	0.3	
Mieterpartei					69	0.3	
ÖDP	Steffen Kadow	93	0.3		56	0.2	
DKP					50	0.2	▼0.2
NPD					48	0.2	▼0.5
Bildet Berlin!					45	0.2	
Bergpartei, die ÜberPartei					39	0.1	
LKR	Christian Seiffert	35	0.1		27	0.1	▼0.3
The Pinks/Alliance 21					15	0.1	
SGP					10	0.0	▼0.1
BüSo					4	0.0	▼0.1
Informal votes		340			286		
Total valid votes		26,728			26,866		
Turnout		27,211	76.2	▲9.1			
Left hold	Majority	1,666	6.2				

=== 2021 election (annulled) ===
The election in 2021 was annulled and rerun in 2023.

State election (2021): Treptow-Köpenick 6
Notes:	Blue background denotes the winner of the electorate vote. Pink background denotes a candidate elected from their party list. Yellow background denotes an electorate win by a list member, or other incumbent. A ✓ or ✗ denotes status of any incumbent, win or lose respectively.						
Party	Candidate	Votes	%	±%	Party votes	%	±%
SPD	Dunja Wolff	5,909	22.0	▼3.3	5,714	21.2	▲0.4
Left	Carsten Schatz	5,468	20.4	▼5.1	5,285	19.6	▼4.1
CDU	Maik Penn	4,862	18.1	▲0.7	4,453	16.5	▲2.4
Greens	Jacob Zellmer	3,817	14.2	▲4.3	3,639	13.5	▲3.8
AfD	Georg Pazderski	2,850	10.6	▼8.3	2,804	10.4	▼8.2
FDP	Stefan Förster	1,782	6.6		1,840	6.8	▲2.1
Tierschutzpartei	Anika Hansen	898	3.3		548	2.0	▲0.4
PARTEI					492	1.8	▲0.1
dieBasis	Annemarie Kloß-Pattschull	568	2.1		453	1.7	
FW	Michael Knape	509	1.9		333	1.2	
The Grays					218	0.8	
Gray Panthers					154	0.6	▼0.5
Volt					141	0.5	
Klimaliste					96	0.4	
APT					88	0.3	
Verjüngungsforschung					81	0.3	▼0.2
Pirates					80	0.3	▼1.0
Team Todenhöfer					67	0.2	
LKR	Judith Burmeister	80	0.3		56	0.2	▼0.2
NPD	Philipp Lindlahr	69	0.3	▼0.4	54	0.2	▼0.4
Mieterpartei					53	0.2	
ÖDP					48	0.2	
Humanists					43	0.2	
DKP					40	0.1	▼0.1
du.					39	0.1	
Bildet Berlin!					38	0.1	
The Pinks/Alliance 21					20	0.1	
Bergpartei, die ÜberPartei					19	0.1	
BüSo					18	0.1	▼0.1
SGP					7	0.0	▼0.1
Informal votes		355			261		
Total valid votes		26,812			26,921		
Turnout		27,240	80.6	▲7.6			
SPD gain from Left	Majority	441	1.6				

== See also ==
- Politics of Berlin
- House of Representatives of Berlin
