= Albert Wolff =

Albert Wolff may refer to:

- Albert Wolff (journalist) (1835–1891), Franco-German journalist
- Albert Wolff (conductor) (1884–1970), French conductor and composer
- Albert Wolff (judge) (1899–1977), Chief Justice of the Supreme Court of Western Australia
- Albert Wolff (fencer) (1906–1989), French-born American Olympic fencer
- Albert Moritz Wolff (1854–1923), German sculptor and medallion-designer
- Albert Wolff (sculptor) (1814–1892), German sculptor
