= Hans Julius Wolff (legal historian) =

German jurist and legal historian

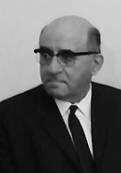
Hans Julius Wolff in 1968

Hans Julius Wolff (born August 27, 1902, Berlin; d. August 23, 1983, Freiburg im Breisgau) was a German legal historian and jurist. He specialized in and was a renowned figure on Roman and Greek law.

== Life ==
Wolff was born to a family of Jewish scholars. His father, Bruno Wolff (1870–1918), was the head physician in the Department of Obstetrics and Gynecology at a head hospital run by the Jewish community in Berlin. He then switched to pathological anatomy and became an assistant at the Pathological Institute in Rostock. In 1913, he completed his habilitation there, and in 1915 he became a professor. Hans followed in his father's footsteps, and went to the universities in Rostock and Berlin, however he studied ancient history, philology, and law. He completed his doctorate in 1932 at the University of Berlin (dissertation: On the position of women in classical Roman dotal law), and briefly worked as a provisional judge. However, soon the Nazi Party would come to power, and Hans was fired under the "law for the restoration of the civil service" which banned Jews from serving in government positions.

In 1935, due to influence from the Emergency Community of German Scientists Abroad, Wolff immigrated to Panama, where he taught at the University of Panama until the end of the 1930s. In 1939, he immigrated once again, this time to the United States, where he spoke at the Riccobono Seminar in the Catholic University of America. He continued studies at the University of Tennessee and University of Michigan, and again resumed teaching at universities across the Midwest, finally landing a job as professor at the Oklahoma City University in 1950.

In 1952, Wolff immigrated back to his home country. At first he taught Roman law at the University of Mainz, then Roman, ancient Greek, and civil law at the University of Freiburg in 1955, where he founded the office for ancient Greek law. His focus was on ancient Attic law and Ptolemaic law as evident from the Greek papyri in ancient Egypt.

In 1972, he was awarded an honorary doctorate by the University of Athens. In 1974–1975, he was a member of the School of Historical Science at the Institute for Advanced Study in Princeton. Since 1963, he was a corresponding member of the Bavarian Academy of Sciences and since 1967, a member of the Heidelberg Academy of Sciences and the Göttingen Academy of Sciences.

While he was born Jewish, he later converted to Protestantism and then Catholicism.

== Works ==
- Papyrology: Its Scope, History, and Achievements (Bulletin of the Polish Institute of Arts and Sciences in America; 1944–1945)
- Roman Law: An Historical Introduction (University of Oklahoma Press; 1951)
- The Basics of Greek Contract Law (Journal of the Savigny Foundation; 1957)
- New Legal Documents: Volumes I-VII (Journal of the Savigny Foundation; 1956-1983)
- Thesaurus Linguae Latinae: Volumes V & VIII
- For references to a full bibliography of Wolff's work, see "Database of Classical Scholars," WOLFF, Hans Julius.
