= Sam Wolff =

American baseball player (born 1991)

- Pitcher
- Born: April 14, 1991 (age 34); Rapid City, South Dakota, U.S.
- Bats: Right Throws: Right
- Stats at Baseball Reference

Samuel Taylor Wolff (born April 14, 1991) is an American former professional baseball pitcher. He played college baseball for the University of San Diego, College of Southern Nevada, and University of New Mexico. The Texas Rangers selected him in the sixth round of the 2013 MLB draft.

== High school and college ==
Wolff attended Stevens High School in Rapid City, South Dakota. He began his collegiate career at the University of San Diego with the San Diego Toreros, then transferred to the College of Southern Nevada for his sophomore year. He then transferred to the University of New Mexico for his junior and senior years, where he pitched for the New Mexico Lobos. He was selected in the 42nd round of the 2009 MLB draft by the Los Angeles Angels of Anaheim and in the 47th round of the 2011 MLB draft by the Boston Red Sox, but did not sign with either team. The Rangers selected him in the sixth round, with the 190th overall selection, of the 2013 MLB draft, and he received a $65,000 signing bonus from the Rangers.

== Professional career ==
=== Texas Rangers ===
After signing, Wolff was assigned to the Low-A Spokane Indians and later promoted to the Single-A Hickory Crawdads. In 21 relief appearances between the two teams, he was 4–0 with a 0.60 ERA and 44 strikeouts in 30 innings. He spent 2014 with the High-A Myrtle Beach Pelicans and posted a 9–5 record and 3.37 ERA with a 1.17 WHIP in 24 games (23 starts). Wolff missed the 2015 regular season with a torn achilles tendon, but was assigned to the Surprise Saguaros of the Arizona Fall League. In 2016, Wolff played for the Double-A Frisco RoughRiders where he compiled a 4–3 record and 4.83 ERA in only ten starts due to injury, and in 2017, he pitched for both Frisco and the Triple-A Round Rock Express, pitching to a 4–5 record, 2.93 ERA and 1.30 WHIP in 40 appearances out of the bullpen.

=== San Francisco Giants ===
On December 15, 2017, the Rangers traded Wolff and Israel Cruz to the San Francisco Giants in exchange for Matt Moore. Wolff split the 2018 season between the rookie-level Arizona League Giants and the Double-A Richmond Flying Squirrels, going a combined 1–2 with a 6.03 ERA over 31 innings. He split the 2019 season between the AZL Giants, Richmond, and the Triple-A Sacramento River Cats, going a combined 2–2 with a 2.87 ERA and 56 strikeouts over 47 innings.

Wolff did not play in a game in 2020 due to the cancellation of the minor league season because of the COVID-19 pandemic. He spent the 2021 campaign with Triple-A Sacramento, logging a 4.03 ERA with 29 strikeouts in 22 1/3 innings pitched across 24 appearances. He elected minor league free agency following the season on November 7, 2021. Wolf announced his retirement on May 31, 2022.

== Personal life ==
Sam's father, Steve, is a former Minor League Baseball player with the San Diego Padres organization.
