= Alexander Wolff (soldier) =

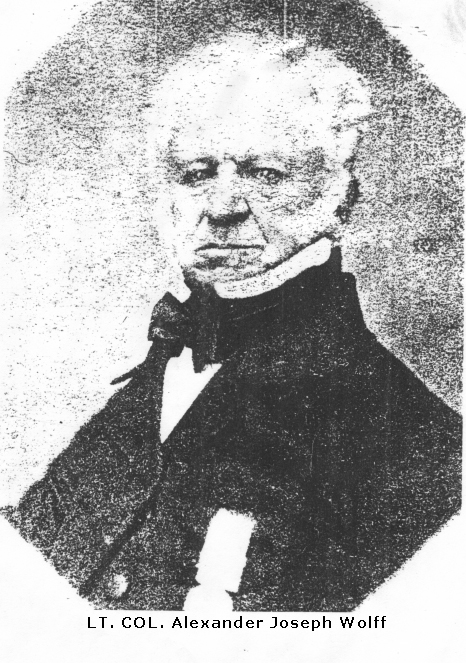
Alexander Joseph Wolff

Lt. Col. Alexander Joseph Wolff (1788–1863) was a British officer who served under the Duke of Wellington.

Wolff was born in Baden, Austria, in 1788. It is sometimes claimed that his father, an army officer, was killed at the "Battle of Lake Constance" (probably during the "First Battle of Stockach" in 1799 or the "Second Battle of Stockach" in May 1800) around the year 1800. He became an orphan but was fortunate to be adopted by a British Army officer. As a result, he served in the British Army under the Duke of Wellington.

== War campaigns ==
In 1801 he entered the British Army at 13 years old, where he served in Egypt under Ralph Abercromby to dispossess the French of Egypt.

Following this great battle where General Abercromby died, he was transferred under Duke Wellington, where he fought in the Napoleonic Peninsular Wars that raged from 1804 to 1815 in Spain and Portugal. Some years after his military career, he received the Military General Service Medal with thirteen clasps for battles fought during this period.

=== Peninsular War ===
- 1808: Dispatched from Cork To Portugal under Duke Wellington then Sir Arthur Wellesley
- 1808: 17 and 21 August – fought the French Roliçia and Vimeiro in Portugal
- 1809: May – Crossed the Douro under Sir Arthur, defeated Marshal Soult and took Oporto from the French
- 1809: Advanced into Spain to expel the French from the Peninsula
- 1809: July – Falanera battle
- 1811: May- Fuentes de Oñoro to stop Marshal Massena
- 1811: May – Albuera
- 1812: January – Stormed and took Ciudad Rodrigo (wounded)
- 1812: April – Siege and capture of Badajoz (wounded)
- 1812: July – Battle of Oporto and Salamanca (wounded)
- 1813: June – Battle of Vittoria

=== Pyrenees Campaign ===
- 1813: November – Battle Nivelles and the Nives
- 1814: February – Battle of Orthez, France (wounded)
- 1814: April – Taking of Toulouse under Marshal Soult

== Retirement ==
After his military service, Alexander Joseph Wolff was given a grant of land in Valcartier (Lower Canada) with his men. When his ship docked at Halifax in 1824, he and his men made preparations for a long overland march to Quebec City in the dead of winter. On the way, several of his men died of exposure and hardship.

He established himself and his family in the small town of St. Gabriel de Valcartier. He became commander of the 11th Battalion of the Quebec Militia.(Genealogy of Families of Valcartier, Quebec)

In 1826 and 1827 he was in charge of repairs to the Portage road in Témiscouata (Lower Canada). But the area where the road laid was a swamp and it became very difficult to maintain. In autumn of 1830, after a few years of scouting for a new location, he built a new road between Métis and Lac Matapédia.

== Family information ==
Alexander Joseph Wolff married Hannah Maria Ellert. They had eight children (five boys and three girls).

- Dr. James John Fitzgerald Wolff (1818–1880)
- George Jacob Wolff (1819–1892)
- Anthony Henry Wolff (1823–1824)
- Caroline Amelia Wolff (1824–1895)
- Charlotte Wolff (1825–?)
- Margaret Maria Wolff (1812-1893)
- Arthur Alexander Wolff (1829–1897)
- Col. Charles Stuart Wolff (1831–1909) married Isabel Neilson (1831–1895) grand daughter of John Neilson

== See also ==
- Timeline of Quebec history
- Lower Canada Rebellion
