= Edward Blackadder =

Canadian politician (1874–1922)

Member of the Canadian Parliament for Halifax
- In office 1921–1922
- Preceded by: Peter Francis Martin
- Succeeded by: Robert Emmett Finn

Personal details
- Born: April 18, 1874 Wolfville, Nova Scotia
- Died: October 22, 1922 (aged 48) Halifax, Nova Scotia
- Party: Liberal
- Occupation: lecturer, physician, professor

Edward Blackadder (April 18, 1874 in Wolfville, Nova Scotia – October 22, 1922) was a Canadian politician, lecturer, physician and professor in Nova Scotia, Canada. He was elected to the House of Commons of Canada in 1921 as a Member of the Liberal Party to represent the riding of Halifax.

== Biography ==
He was the son of William Blackadder and May Henderson and was educated at Acadia University and Dalhousie University. Blackadder practised medicine for two years in Westport, Nova Scotia and then for 15 years in Halifax. He was a professor of Medical Jurisprudence at Dalhousie University from 1908 to 1920. Blackadder was also an editorial writer for the Acadian Recorder in Halifax from 1907 to 1922 and published a book of sonnets in 1895. Before being elected, he was an unsuccessful candidate in the 1911 election. Blackadder died in office having served just 321 days.

== Electoral history ==
1921 Canadian federal election: Halifax
Party	Candidate	Votes	%	Elected
Liberal	Edward Blackadder	16,157	26.70	✓
Liberal	Alexander Kenneth Maclean	15,892	26.27	✓
Conservative	Hector McInnes	11,016	18.21	
Conservative	James Wilfred Doyle	9,537	15.76	
Labour	Arthur Charles Hawkins	4,141	6.84	
Labour	Joseph Sylvester Wallace	3,763	6.22	
Total valid votes		60,506	100.00	
Source(s) "Halifax (1867- )". History of Federal Ridings Since 1867. Library of Parliament. Two members were elected from the district.

1911 Canadian federal election: Halifax
Party	Candidate	Votes	%	±%	Elected
Conservative	Robert Borden	7,040	25.46	-1.34	✓
Liberal	Alexander Kenneth Maclean	6,946	25.12		✓
Liberal	Edward Blackadder	6,879	24.88		
Conservative	Adam Brown Crosby	6,787	24.54	-1.27	
Total valid votes		27,652	100.00		
Conservative hold		Swing		-2.61	
Liberal gain from Conservative		Swing		–	
Source(s) "Halifax (1867- )". History of Federal Ridings Since 1867. Library of Parliament. Two members were elected from the district.
