= John Dickey (Canadian politician) =

Canadian politician

Member of Parliament for Halifax
- In office July 1947 – June 1957
- Preceded by: William Chisholm MacDonald
- Succeeded by: Robert McCleave; Edmund L. Morris

Personal details
- Born: John Horace Dickey; 4 September 1914 Edmonton, Alberta
- Died: 27 April 1996 (aged 81) Sydney, Nova Scotia
- Party: Liberal
- Profession: barrister, executive, lawyer

John Horace Dickey (4 September 1914 – 27 April 1996) was a Liberal party member of the House of Commons of Canada. He was a barrister, executive and lawyer by career.

He was first elected to Parliament at the Halifax riding in a by-election on 14 July 1947 which was called after the death of William Chisholm MacDonald, one of the riding's Liberal incumbents. Since Halifax riding elected two members to the House of Commons at that time, Dickey joined the other incumbent, fellow Liberal Gordon Benjamin Isnor. Both Dickey and Isnor were re-elected in the 1949 election. Isnor was appointed to the Senate in May 1950 and was joined by another Liberal, Samuel Rosborough Balcom, following a by-election the following month. Both Dickey and Balcom were re-elected to a full term in Parliament in the 1953 election, but were defeated in the 1957 federal election by the two Progressive Conservative party candidates Robert McCleave and Edmund L. Morris. In the 1958 election, Dickey was joined by Leonard Kitz in an unsuccessful attempt to win back the riding for the Liberals. Dickey died in 1996 aged 81.

== Electoral record ==
1953 Canadian federal election: Halifax
Party	Candidate	Votes	%	±%	Elected
Liberal	John Horace Dickey	34,587	27.82	+0.05	✓
Liberal	Samuel Rosborough Balcom	34,222	27.53	*	✓
Progressive Conservative	Edmund L. Morris	26,552	21.36		
Progressive Conservative	Frederick William Bissett	24,112	19.39	+3.39	
Co-operative Commonwealth	Hyacinth Lawrence MacIntosh	2,731	2.20	-3.09	
Co-operative Commonwealth	Lloyd Carman Wilson	2,120	1.71		
Total valid votes		124,324	99.64		
Total rejected, unmarked and declined ballots		449	0.36	+0.07	
Turnout			≥63.52	+0.64	
Eligible voters		98,208			
Liberal notional hold		Swing		-5.39	

^ Individual swings calculated from 1949 election. Party swing calculated from 1950 by-election.

Canadian federal by-election, 19 June 1950
Party	Candidate	Votes	%	Elected
Liberal	Samuel Rosborough Balcom	24,665	57.07	✓
Progressive Conservative	Lloyd Allen	13,696	31.69	
Co-operative Commonwealth	J.W.A. Nicholson	4,861	11.25	
Total valid votes		43,222	100.00	
Called upon Gordon Isnor being called to the Senate, 2 May 1950

1949 Canadian federal election: Halifax
Party	Candidate	Votes	%	±%	Elected
Liberal	Gordon Benjamin Isnor	33,401	29.33		✓
Liberal	John Horace Dickey	31,627	27.77	+5.28	✓
Progressive Conservative	Joseph Patrick Connolly	18,826	16.53		
Progressive Conservative	Frederick William Bissett	18,223	16.00		
Co-operative Commonwealth	Hyacinth Lawrence MacIntosh	6,018	5.28		
Co-operative Commonwealth	Lloyd R. Shaw	5,777	5.07	-3.44	
Total valid votes		113,872	99.71		
Total rejected, unmarked and declined ballots		329	0.29		
Turnout			≥62.88	+1.30	
Eligible voters		90,803			
Liberal notional hold		Swing		+2.45	

^ Individual swings calculated from 1945 election. Party swing calculated from 1947 by-election.

Canadian federal by-election, 14 July 1947
Party	Candidate	Votes	%	Elected
Liberal	John Horace Dickey	24,469	44.99	✓
Co-operative Commonwealth	Hyacinth Lawrence MacIntosh	16,151	29.70	
Progressive Conservative	Alex A. McDonald	13,768	25.31	
Total valid votes		54,388	100.00	
