= List of members of the Canadian House of Commons with military service (I) =

Name	Elected party	Constituency	Elected date	Military service
William Irvine	Labour	East Calgary	December 6, 1921	Militia
Thomas Irwin	Social Credit	Burnaby—Richmond	June 10, 1957	Canadian Army, British Army
Gordon Benjamin Isnor	Liberal	Halifax	October 14, 1935	Canadian Army (1915-1918)
