= Samuel Rosborough Balcom =

Canadian politician (1888–1981)

Member of Parliament for Halifax
- In office 1950–1953
- Preceded by: Gordon Benjamin Isnor
- Succeeded by: Robert McCleave
- In office 1953–1957

Personal details
- Born: March 24, 1888 Port Dufferin, Nova Scotia
- Died: May 4, 1981 (aged 93)
- Party: Liberal
- Profession: Businessman pharmacist

Samuel Rosborough Balcom (March 24, 1888 – May 4, 1981) was a Canadian politician, businessman and pharmacist. He was elected to the House of Commons of Canada in a June 19, 1950 by-election as a Member of the Liberal Party representing the riding of Halifax, after Isnor was called to the Senate. He was re-elected in 1953 and defeated in 1957. Prior to his federal political experience, he was a commanding officer in medical stores during World War II between 1942 and 1942. Between 1944 and 1945, he was chief medical stores inspection officer in the Canadian Army.

== Electoral record ==
1957 Canadian federal election: Halifax
Party	Candidate	Votes	%	±%	Elected
Progressive Conservative	Robert McCleave	41,140	25.32		✓
Progressive Conservative	Edmund L. Morris	41,099	25.29	+3.94	✓
Liberal	Samuel Rosborough Balcom	38,504	23.70	-3.83	
Liberal	John Horace Dickey	38,191	23.51	-4.32	
Co-operative Commonwealth	Hyacinth Lawrence MacIntosh	1,984	1.22	-0.98	
Co-operative Commonwealth	Lloyd Carman Wilson	1,562	0.96	-0.74	
Total valid votes		162,480	99.64		
Total rejected, unmarked and declined ballots		590	0.36	+0.00	
Turnout			≥75.21	+11.68	
Eligible voters		108,414			
Progressive Conservative notional gain from Liberal		Swing		+9.00	

1953 Canadian federal election: Halifax
Party	Candidate	Votes	%	±%	Elected
Liberal	John Horace Dickey	34,587	27.82	+0.05	✓
Liberal	Samuel Rosborough Balcom	34,222	27.53	*	✓
Progressive Conservative	Edmund L. Morris	26,552	21.36		
Progressive Conservative	Frederick William Bissett	24,112	19.39	+3.39	
Co-operative Commonwealth	Hyacinth Lawrence MacIntosh	2,731	2.20	-3.09	
Co-operative Commonwealth	Lloyd Carman Wilson	2,120	1.71		
Total valid votes		124,324	99.64		
Total rejected, unmarked and declined ballots		449	0.36	+0.07	
Turnout			≥63.52	+0.64	
Eligible voters		98,208			
Liberal notional hold		Swing		-5.39	

^ Individual swings calculated from 1949 election. Party swing calculated from 1950 by-election.

Canadian federal by-election, 19 June 1950
Party	Candidate	Votes	%	Elected
Liberal	Samuel Rosborough Balcom	24,665	57.07	✓
Progressive Conservative	Lloyd Allen	13,696	31.69	
Co-operative Commonwealth	J.W.A. Nicholson	4,861	11.25	
Total valid votes		43,222	100.00	
Called upon Gordon Isnor being called to the Senate, 2 May 1950
