= Edmund L. Morris =

Canadian politician

Edmund Leverett Morris

MLA for Halifax Needham
- In office 1980–1988
- Preceded by: Gerald Regan
- Succeeded by: Gerry O'Malley

Mayor of Halifax
- In office 1974–1980
- Preceded by: Walter Fitzgerald
- Succeeded by: Ronald Hanson

Member of Parliament for Halifax
- In office June 1957 – February 1963
- Preceded by: John Dickey
- Succeeded by: Gerald Regan

Personal details
- Born: 4 February 1923 Halifax, Nova Scotia
- Died: 3 January 2003 (aged 79) Halifax, Nova Scotia
- Party: Progressive Conservative
- Spouse: Lorraine Ware
- Profession: broadcaster, journalist, radio commentator

Edmund Leverett Morris (4 February 1923 – 3 January 2003) was a Canadian politician, broadcaster and university administrator.

== Early life and education ==
Born in Halifax, Nova Scotia, he was the only son of Leverett Morris and Catherine Larsen. He attended school at Saint Mary's Boys School. After graduating high school, he pursued an undergraduate and graduate degree in political science from Dalhousie University. After graduation, he went to work for a local radio station in Halifax.

== Political career ==
In the 1953 federal election, Morris made his first attempt into politics when he ran as the Progressive Conservative candidate in the electoral district of Halifax. Although he lost, he continued to be involved in politics at the local level, and offered himself for election again in the 1957 election, in which he was elected to the House of Commons of Canada.

Between 1957 and 1963, Morris represented the riding of Halifax in the House of Commons. He held the positions of Parliamentary Secretary to the Postmaster General, and Parliamentary Secretary to the Minister of Commerce.

In 1963, Morris was appointed as chief assistant to the President of Saint Mary's University in Halifax, Nova Scotia. Saint Mary's, a Catholic university administered by the Society of Jesus, saw Morris serving as one of the few lay persons on staff. Morris was instrumental in large scale building programs at the university throughout the 1960s as well as the eventual change of the university to non-denominational institution in 1970. Morris served as Interim President of Saint Mary's University during the school year 1970–1971.

Between 1974 and 1980, Morris served as Mayor of the City of Halifax.

After stepping down as Mayor of Halifax, Morris, entered provincial politics by standing as the Progressive Conservative candidate in the urban riding of Halifax Needham, during a by-election, on 6 May 1980. Morris won the seat by 26 votes. Morris was re-elected in 1981 and 1984. Morris served as Minister of Intergovernmental Affairs, Municipal Affairs, Fisheries and Social Services.

Morris received an honorary degree, Doctor of Civil Law, from Saint Mary's University in 1986.

== Death ==
Morris died on 3 January 2003, at age 79.

== Electoral record ==
1962 Canadian federal election: Halifax
Party	Candidate	Votes	%	±%	Elected
Progressive Conservative	Robert McCleave	42,964	23.77	-6.28	✓
Progressive Conservative	Edmund L. Morris	41,804	23.12	-6.68	✓
Liberal	John Lloyd	41,472	22.94		
Liberal	Gerald A. Regan	40,635	22.48		
New Democratic	James H. Aitchison	6,464	3.58		
New Democratic	Perry Ronayne	5,653	3.13		
Social Credit	Robert J. Kuglin	1,784	0.99		
Total valid votes		180,776	100.00		
Progressive Conservative notional hold		Swing		-10.40	

1958 Canadian federal election: Halifax
Party	Candidate	Votes	%	±%	Elected
Progressive Conservative	Robert McCleave	53,693	30.05	+4.73	✓
Progressive Conservative	Edmund L. Morris	53,255	29.80	+4.51	✓
Liberal	John Horace Dickey	34,227	19.15	-4.35	
Liberal	Leonard Kitz	32,916	18.42		
Co-operative Commonwealth	Hyacinth Lawrence MacIntosh	2,552	1.43	+0.21	
Co-operative Commonwealth	Lloyd Carman Wilson	2,048	1.15	+0.18	
Total valid votes		178,691	100.00		
Progressive Conservative notional hold		Swing		+9.43	

1957 Canadian federal election: Halifax
Party	Candidate	Votes	%	±%	Elected
Progressive Conservative	Robert McCleave	41,140	25.32		✓
Progressive Conservative	Edmund L. Morris	41,099	25.29	+3.94	✓
Liberal	Samuel Rosborough Balcom	38,504	23.70	-3.83	
Liberal	John Horace Dickey	38,191	23.51	-4.32	
Co-operative Commonwealth	Hyacinth Lawrence MacIntosh	1,984	1.22	-0.98	
Co-operative Commonwealth	Lloyd Carman Wilson	1,562	0.96	-0.74	
Total valid votes		162,480	99.64		
Total rejected, unmarked and declined ballots		590	0.36	+0.00	
Turnout			≥75.21	+11.68	
Eligible voters		108,414			
Progressive Conservative notional gain from Liberal		Swing		+9.00	

1953 Canadian federal election: Halifax
Party	Candidate	Votes	%	±%	Elected
Liberal	John Horace Dickey	34,587	27.82	+0.05	✓
Liberal	Samuel Rosborough Balcom	34,222	27.53	*	✓
Progressive Conservative	Edmund L. Morris	26,552	21.36		
Progressive Conservative	Frederick William Bissett	24,112	19.39	+3.39	
Co-operative Commonwealth	Hyacinth Lawrence MacIntosh	2,731	2.20	-3.09	
Co-operative Commonwealth	Lloyd Carman Wilson	2,120	1.71		
Total valid votes		124,324	99.64		
Total rejected, unmarked and declined ballots		449	0.36	+0.07	
Turnout			≥63.52	+0.64	
Eligible voters		98,208			
Liberal notional hold		Swing		-5.39	

^ Individual swings calculated from 1949 election. Party swing calculated from 1950 by-election.
