= Cowie Hill =

- Community
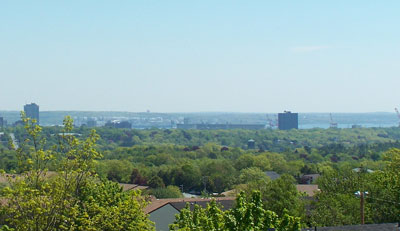
- View of Halifax's South End from Cowie Hill

- Location within Nova Scotia
- Country: Canada
- Province: Nova Scotia
- Municipality: Halifax
- Community: Halifax
- Municipal district: District 11

Area
  - Total: 1.32 km^{2} (0.51 sq mi)
- Area code: 782, 902

"View from Cowie's Hill near Halifax", a coloured aquatint by George I. Parkyns, published in 1801, showing the view of the Northwest Arm from Cowie Hill

Cowie Hill is a primarily residential area of Halifax, Nova Scotia, Canada. As the name suggests, the neighbourhood is built on a hill, which overlooks the Northwest Arm and the Halifax peninsula.

== History ==
The hill on which it is situated was originally called "Cowie's Hill", named after one of the original owners of the land, Robert Cowie. Cowie and John Aubony, a baker and a tavern keeper respectively, received a grant of 64.8 hectares in 1752. The land included Cowie's Island, later renamed Melville Island. Over time, the apostrophe in "Cowie's Hill" was dropped.

In the 1970s, the community began to urbanize. A large townhouse development was built along with three apartment towers: Armdale Place (known colloquially as Top of the Mountain), Ridgeway Towers, and Terrace View.

In the early 2000s, Cowie Hill Road was extended to facilitate construction of a new headquarters building for Halifax Water, which is located next to a reservoir tank at the top of Cowie Hill. In the 2010s, the road was further extended to Dunbrack Street.

== Geography ==
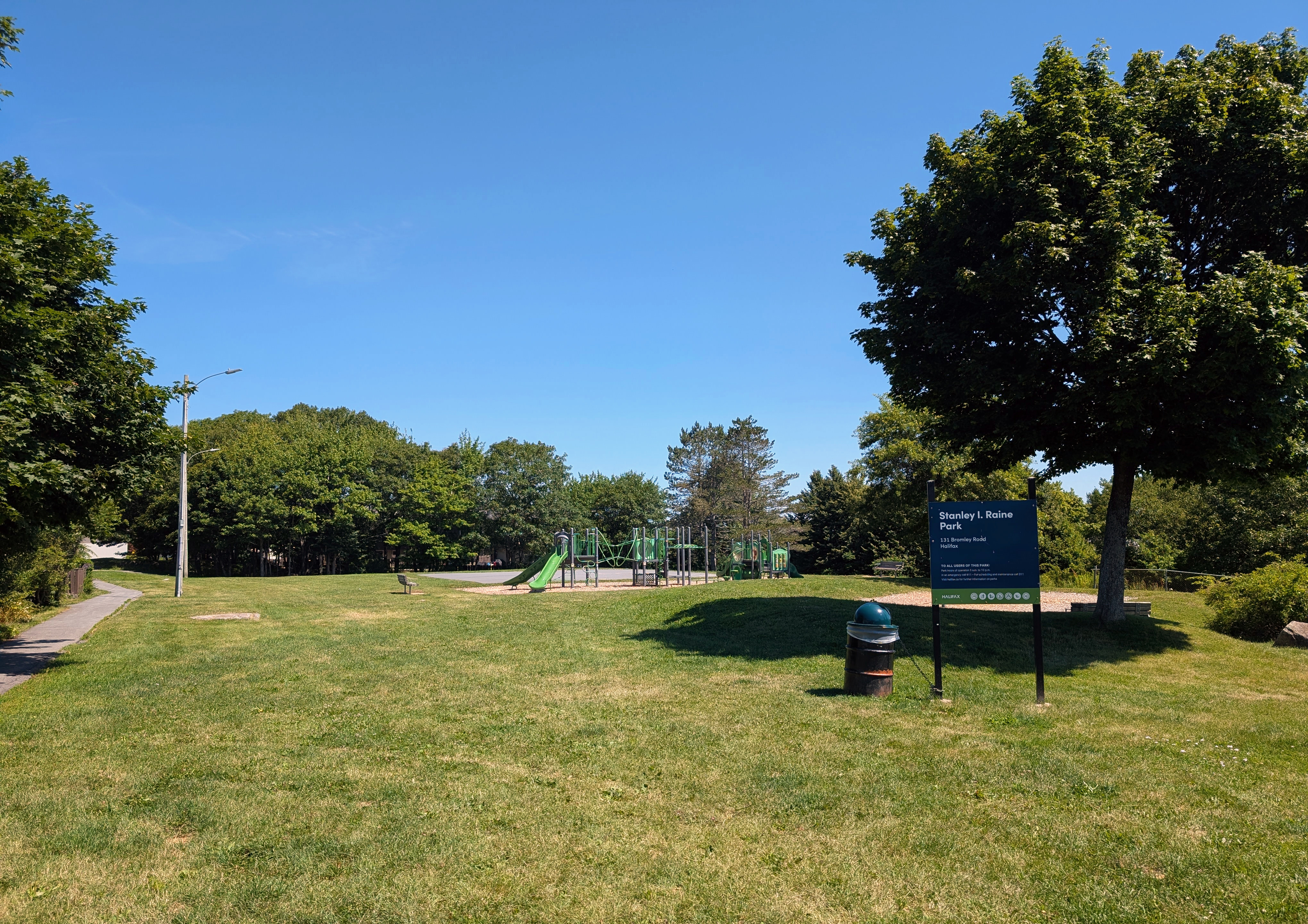
Stanley Raine Park

At its highest point, adjacent to the Armdale Place apartment building, Cowie Hill has a maximum elevation of around 105 metres above mean sea level.

Cowie Hill is a relatively small community with about 132 ha (330 acres) of landmass. The community overlooks the Northwest Arm, and is approximately 6.1 km (3.8 mi) from Downtown Halifax.

Cowie Hill's main streets include Cowie Hill Road, Highfield Street, and Ridge Valley Road. Side streets include Abbey Road, Bromley Road, Cavendish Road, Drumdonald Road, Limerick Road, and Shepherd Road.

The largest park in Cowie Hill is the J. Albert Walker Park located next to the Chebucto Heights Elementary School. It was named in memory of the late J. Albert Walker, a Canadian businessman and politician from Halifax County. He was elected to city council in 1974 as alderman and re-elected in 1984. The city council then elected him to be deputy mayor. Walker retired in 1988, delivering a short farewell speech in council on October 27, 1988.

== Public institutions ==
Cowie Hill has one school, Chebucto Heights Elementary School, constructed in 1974. In 2025, the school had a student population of 492.

The neighbourhood is also home to several municipal government facilities including the headquarters of Halifax Water at 450 Cowie Hill Road. Halifax Water's West Operations Facility is located across the street, at 455 Cowie Hill Road. A municipal operations depot is located at 375 Cowie Hill Road.

In 2025, it was reported that municipal staff had shortlisted Cowie Hill as one of three locations under consideration as the site of a new Halifax Regional Police headquarters complex.

== Transportation ==
The neighbourhood is served by two Halifax Transit bus routes:

- Route 24 Leiblin Park
- Route 127 Cowie Hill Express (peak-hour service only)

== Political representation ==
- Patty Cuttell, Halifax regional councillor for District 11 (municipal)
- Rod Wilson, member of the legislative assembly for Halifax Armdale (provincial)
- Shannon Miedema, member of parliament for Halifax (federal)
