= Felix Patrick Quinn =

Canadian industrialist and politician

The Honourable Felix Patrick Quinn

Member of Parliament for Halifax
- In office January 1926 – July 1935
- Preceded by: Robert Emmett Finn
- Succeeded by: Robert Emmett Finn; Gordon Benjamin Isnor

Member of the Senate of Canada
- In office July 1935 – March 1961

Personal details
- Born: 2 November 1874 Halifax, Nova Scotia, Canada
- Died: 28 March 1961 (aged 86)
- Party: Conservative
- Profession: industrialist

Felix Patrick Quinn (2 November 1874 – 28 March 1961) was a Canadian industrialist and parliamentarian.

A Conservative, he served three terms in the House of Commons of Canada as a Member of Parliament representing the Nova Scotia electoral district of Halifax.

He was first elected in the Canadian federal election of 1925 and was re-elected in 1926 and 1930.

Quinn was appointed to the Senate of Canada on 20 July 1935 on the recommendation of R.B. Bennett. He represented the senatorial division of Bedford-Halifax until his death at the age of 86.

== Electoral record ==
1930 Canadian federal election: Halifax
Party	Candidate	Votes	%	±%	Elected
Conservative	William Anderson Black	21,611	26.51	-1.82	✓
Conservative	Felix Patrick Quinn	21,280	26.11	-1.05	✓
Liberal	Peter R. Jack	19,439	23.85		
Liberal	Edward Joseph Cragg	19,185	23.54		
Total valid votes		81,515	100.00		
Turnout			≥76.68		
Eligible voters		53,154			
Conservative notional hold		Swing		-2.87	
Source: Sayers, Anthony (2017). "1930 Federal Election". Canadian Elections Database.

1926 Canadian federal election: Halifax
Party	Candidate	Votes	%	±%	Elected
Conservative	William Anderson Black	17,911	28.33	-3.96	✓
Conservative	Felix Patrick Quinn	17,171	27.16	-3.76	✓
Liberal	James Layton Ralston	14,139	22.36		
Liberal	John Murphy	14,007	22.15		
Total valid votes		63,228	100.00		
Conservative notional hold		Swing		-7.71	

1925 Canadian federal election: Halifax
Party	Candidate	Votes	%	±%	Elected
Conservative	William Anderson Black	18,796	32.29		✓
Conservative	Felix Patrick Quinn	17,996	30.91		✓
Liberal	Gordon Ross Marshall	10,815	18.58		
Liberal	Robert Emmett Finn	10,609	18.22		
Total valid votes		58,216	100.00		
Conservative notional hold		Swing		+9.30	
