= Halifax—East Hants =

Former federal electoral district in Nova Scotia, Canada

Nova Scotia electoral district

Defunct federal electoral district
- Legislature: House of Commons
- District created: 1966
- District abolished: 1976
- First contested: 1968
- Last contested: 1978 by-election

Halifax—East Hants was a federal electoral district in the province of Nova Scotia, Canada, that was represented in the House of Commons of Canada from 23 April 1968 to 25 March 1979. The riding was created in 1966 from parts of Colchester—Hants riding. It consisted of the Municipality of East Hants in the county of Hants, and parts of the county of Halifax and the city of Halifax.

The electoral district was abolished in 1976 when it was redistributed between Annapolis Valley—Hants, Halifax and Halifax West ridings.

== Members of Parliament ==
This riding has elected the following members of Parliament:

Parliament	Years	Member	Party
Halifax—East Hants; Riding created from Colchester—Hants
28th	1968–1972	Robert McCleave	Progressive Conservative
29th	1972–1974	Robert McCleave	Progressive Conservative
30th	1974–1977	Robert McCleave	Progressive Conservative
30th	1978–1979	Howard Edward Crosby	Progressive Conservative
Riding dissolved into Annapolis Valley—Hants, Halifax and Halifax West

== Election results ==
1968 Canadian federal election
Party	Candidate	Votes
Progressive Conservative	Bob McCleave	22,323
Liberal	Alex J. Cregan	13,488
New Democratic	Burris Devanney	1,718

1972 Canadian federal election
Party	Candidate	Votes
Progressive Conservative	Bob McCleave	27,645
Liberal	Mary M. Casey	14,308
New Democratic	Donald Aube	5,530
Not affiliated	Barbara Joan Biley	135

1974 Canadian federal election
Party	Candidate	Votes
Progressive Conservative	Bob McCleave	25,563
Liberal	Bill Ozard	18,308
New Democratic	Lloyd R. Shaw	5,861
Social Credit	Robert Kirk	204
Marxist–Leninist	Robert Andstein	113

By-election On Mr. McCleave's resignation, 9 December 1977

By-election on 16 October 1978
Party	Candidate	Votes
Progressive Conservative	Howard Crosby	18,767
Liberal	MACINNIS, Ken	10,161
New Democratic	DOULL, Edgar Charles	1,697
Not affiliated	MORGAN, David	355

== See also ==
- List of Canadian electoral districts
- Historical federal electoral districts of Canada
