= Alexander Kenneth Maclean =

Canadian politician

The Honourable Alexander Kenneth Maclean PC
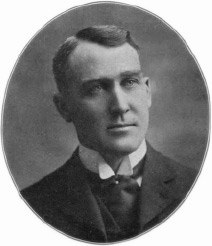

Member of the Canadian Parliament for Lunenburg
- In office 1904–1911
- Preceded by: Charles Edwin Kaulbach
- Succeeded by: John Drew Sperry

Member of the Canadian Parliament for Halifax
- In office 1911–1923

Member of the Nova Scotia House of Assembly for Lunenburg
- In office 1901–1904
- In office 1909–1911

Personal details
- Born: October 18, 1869 Upper Sydney, Nova Scotia
- Died: July 31, 1942 (aged 72)
- Party: Liberal
- Cabinet: Minister Without Portfolio (1917-1920)

Alexander Kenneth Maclean, PC (October 18, 1869 – July 31, 1942) was a Canadian politician and judge.

== Early life and education ==
Born in Upper North Sydney, Cape Breton County, Nova Scotia, Maclean was educated at Pictou Academy and Dalhousie University.

== Career ==
A lawyer, practising in Lunenburg, Nova Scotia, Maclean first ran unsuccessfully for the House of Commons of Canada in the 1900 federal election for the electoral district of Lunenburg. In 1901, he was elected to the Nova Scotia House of Assembly for Lunenburg. A Nova Scotia Liberal, he served until 1904 when he was elected to the House of Commons representing Lunenburg.

He resigned as an MP in 1909, when he was re-elected to the House of Assembly and was appointed Attorney General and Commissioner of Crown Lands in the cabinet of George Henry Murray. He served until 1911, when he was elected again to the House of Commons for the electoral district of Halifax. As a result of the Conscription Crisis of 1917 he crossed the floor on October 10, 1917, to support the Unionist government of Sir Robert Laird Borden and was a minister without portfolio in the Cabinet. He left the government in 1920 and was re-elected as a Liberal in the 1921 general election.

He resigned his seat in 1923 to become President of the Exchequer Court of Canada, holding that position until his death. He also acted as an ad hoc judge at the Supreme Court of Canada, sitting 67 times during his career.

His most significant decision is considered to be the one he wrote in R. v. Eastern Terminal Elevator Co., which was affirmed by the Supreme Court. Maclean's decision is generally considered to be highly competent, where the issue was well thought out and analyzed, in contrast with Duff J's subsequent opinion at the SCC.

== Electoral results ==
1921 Canadian federal election: Halifax
Party	Candidate	Votes	%	Elected
Liberal	Edward Blackadder	16,157	26.70	✓
Liberal	Alexander Kenneth Maclean	15,892	26.27	✓
Conservative	Hector McInnes	11,016	18.21	
Conservative	James Wilfred Doyle	9,537	15.76	
Labour	Arthur Charles Hawkins	4,141	6.84	
Labour	Joseph Sylvester Wallace	3,763	6.22	
Total valid votes		60,506	100.00	
Source(s) "Halifax (1867- )". History of Federal Ridings Since 1867. Library of Parliament. Two members were elected from the district.

1917 Canadian federal election: Halifax
Party	Candidate	Votes	Elected
Government (Unionist)	Alexander Kenneth Maclean	acclaimed	✓
Government (Unionist)	Peter Francis Martin	acclaimed	✓

1911 Canadian federal election: Halifax
Party	Candidate	Votes	%	±%	Elected
Conservative	Robert Borden	7,040	25.46	-1.34	✓
Liberal	Alexander Kenneth Maclean	6,946	25.12		✓
Liberal	Edward Blackadder	6,879	24.88		
Conservative	Adam Brown Crosby	6,787	24.54	-1.27	
Total valid votes		27,652	100.00		
Conservative hold		Swing		-2.61	
Liberal gain from Conservative		Swing		–	
Source(s) "Halifax (1867- )". History of Federal Ridings Since 1867. Library of Parliament. Two members were elected from the district.

1908 Canadian federal election: Lunenburg
Party	Candidate	Votes
Liberal	Alexander Kenneth Maclean	3,533
Conservative	Carmon Smith Marshall	3,332

1904 Canadian federal election: Lunenburg
Party	Candidate	Votes
Liberal	Alexander Kenneth Maclean	3,274
Conservative	Charles Edwin Kaulbach	2,822

1900 Canadian federal election: Lunenburg
Party	Candidate	Votes
Conservative	Charles Edwin Kaulbach	2,896
Liberal	Alexander Kenneth Maclean	2,574
