= Alexa McDonough =

Canadian politician (1944–2022)

Alexa McDonough OC ONS
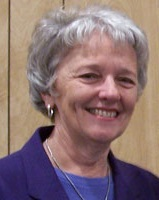
- McDonough in 2008

Leader of the New Democratic Party
- In office October 14, 1995 – January 25, 2003
- Preceded by: Audrey McLaughlin
- Succeeded by: Jack Layton

Member of Parliament for Halifax
- In office June 2, 1997 – October 14, 2008
- Preceded by: Mary Clancy
- Succeeded by: Megan Leslie

Leader of the Nova Scotia New Democratic Party
- In office November 16, 1980 – November 19, 1994
- Preceded by: Buddy MacEachern
- Succeeded by: John Holm

Member of the Legislative Assembly of Nova Scotia
- In office May 25, 1993 – October 20, 1995
- Preceded by: Constituency established
- Succeeded by: Eileen O'Connell
- Constituency: Halifax Fairview
- In office October 6, 1981 – May 25, 1993
- Preceded by: Walter Fitzgerald
- Succeeded by: Jay Abbass
- Constituency: Halifax Chebucto

Personal details
- Born: Alexa Ann Shaw; August 11, 1944 Ottawa, Ontario, Canada
- Died: January 15, 2022 (aged 77) Halifax, Nova Scotia, Canada
- Party: New Democratic (from 1974)
- Other political affiliations: Liberal (1970–1974)
- Spouse: Peter McDonough (m. 1966; div. 1993)
- Domestic partner: David MacDonald (1997–2004)
- Children: 2
- Parents: Lloyd R. Shaw (father); Jean MacKinnon (mother)
- Education: Dalhousie University (BA)
- Profession: Politician; social worker

Alexa Ann McDonough (née Shaw; August 11, 1944 – January 15, 2022) was a Canadian politician who was the first woman to lead a major, recognized political party in Canada, at any level, when she was the leader of the Nova Scotia New Democratic Party (NSNDP) from 1980 to 1994. Subsequently, she served as leader of the federal New Democratic Party (NDP) from 1995 to 2003.

Prior to her political career, McDonough was a social worker in Halifax, Nova Scotia during the 1970s. Originally, she was a Nova Scotia Liberal Party worker and wrote their social-work policy for the 1970 election. By 1974, she grew disenchanted with the Liberal government and joined the NDP. Her first foray into electoral politics as a candidate happened at the end of the 1970s, but was not successful.

In June 1980, there was a major rift between the NSNDP executive, mainly people from Nova Scotia's mainland, and its Cape Breton Island-based legislative caucus over Jeremy Akerman's resignation as leader. The divided party she inherited as the new leader, in November 1980, forced her to deal with a crisis within her legislative caucus. Eventually, she decided to eject Paul MacEwan from both the legislative caucus and the party that December. McDonough won elected office in 1981 and served as a member of the Nova Scotia Legislature until 1995. During those first years, she was the only female Member of the Legislative Assembly (MLA) and had to deal with sexism both in and out of the legislature. Throughout this time, she represented the Halifax Chebucto and Halifax Fairview electoral districts. When she unexpectedly stepped down as the NSNDP's leader in 1994, she was the country's senior incumbent political leader.

She subsequently ran as the underdog candidate for leader of the federal NDP and surprisingly won it after one-round of voting in October 1995. She spent the next two years rebuilding a federal party that lost official party status in the previous election, before running for a seat in the House of Commons. The NDP had a breakthrough in Atlantic Canada during the 1997 election and regained party status in the House. McDonough was elected the Member of Parliament (MP) for the federal electoral district of Halifax in 1997. She was criticized by unions, in particular the Canadian Auto Workers union (CAW), and progressive party members of trying to move the party to the centre-left with Third Way policies. Her most visible campaign as leader was to help win the freedom of Maher Arar, who was a victim of "extraordinary rendition" during the United States's war on terror at the turn of the 21st century. She stepped down as party leader in 2003 but continued to serve as an MP for two more terms, until 2008, when she retired from politics altogether.

In 2009, she became the interim president of Mount Saint Vincent University and was appointed an Officer of the Order of Canada in December of that year. She suffered from ill-health in her final years, battling both cancer and Alzheimer's disease before dying in 2022.

== Early life and education ==
McDonough was born Alexa Ann Shaw in Ottawa, Ontario, on August 11, 1944, at the Ottawa Civic Hospital. Her parents were Jean MacKinnon and Lloyd Robert Shaw, a wealthy businessman who was committed to progressive politics. He served as the first research director for the federal NDP's predecessor, the national Co-operative Commonwealth Federation (CCF), and was an early financial backer of the NDP when it formed in 1961.

McDonough was involved in social activism from an early age, when, at 14, she led her church youth group in publicizing the conditions of Africville, a low-income, predominantly Black neighbourhood in Halifax. She attended Queen's University in Kingston, Ontario, which was her family's alma mater. After two years, she transferred to Dalhousie University in Halifax, where she completed a Bachelor of Arts degree in sociology and psychology in 1965. She became a social worker and, during the 1970 Nova Scotia general election, worked for Gerald Regan's Liberal Party, writing that party's social policy platform. She quickly became disenchanted with Regan and the Liberals and joined the New Democratic Party in 1974.

== Provincial leadership ==
McDonough's first foray into electoral politics occurred during the 1979 and 1980 federal elections. In both of those elections, she ran unsuccessfully in the federal Halifax electoral district. In the 1980 federal election, she lost to former Nova Scotia premier Gerald Regan, the same politician that she once supported back in 1970.

=== Rift between Cape Breton and the Mainland ===
Just after the 1980 federal election, in the spring, Jeremy Akerman stepped down as the Nova Scotia NDP's leader. At this time, there was a growing rift between the Cape Breton Island and Mainland wings of the party.

This rift exploded in June, when Paul MacEwan, the NDP MLA for Cape Breton Nova, was expelled from the party due to his constant public airing of internal party disputes, including the implication that Akerman resigned due to "Trotskyist elements" from the mostly mainland-based provincial council. To make this situation worse for an incoming leader, the NDP's four MLAs, all from Cape Breton constituencies, voted 3–1 to keep him in the caucus, with Len J. Arsenault – the MLA for Cape Breton North – being the only negative vote. MacEwan's expulsion became one of the dominant issues during the leadership race that fall.

In late September, Akerman was appointed to a top Nova Scotia civil service job that required him to both resign from the Legislature and terminate his membership in the NDP. James 'Buddy' MacEachern, a leadership candidate, and MLA for Cape Breton Centre, was made the interim leader on October 2.

=== 1980 NSNDP leadership election ===
Despite these internecine battles, and not having a seat in the Nova Scotia House of Assembly, McDonough decided to enter the leadership race. The third candidate in the race to replace Akerman was Arsenault. The leadership convention was convened in Halifax, with the leadership vote held on November 16, 1980. McDonough received 237 votes, compared to Arsenault's 42 votes, and MacEachern's 41 votes, giving her a first ballot landslide victory. As a result of her victory, she became the first woman in Canada to lead a major recognized political party.

McDonough's first order of business was to settle the Paul MacEwan question. On December 9, 1980, she managed to get her former leadership rivals to vote MacEwan out of the caucus and party.

=== 1981 Nova Scotia general election ===
Since she did not have a seat in the Nova Scotia House of Assembly, the party was left with just two seats, because MacEwan was now an independent, and Akerman's seat was left vacant due to his resignation. For almost a year, she would sit in the Assembly's visitors gallery until she could run for a seat in the 1981 Nova Scotia general election. McDonough's first provincial election as leader was fought in the Halifax Chebucto electoral district, where the Liberals and Conservatives were more or less evenly matched in terms of voter support, and the NDP was a distant third in the previous election. McDonough won her seat, the first one for the NDP in Mainland Nova Scotia, but the NDP lost all of its Cape Breton Island seats in the process.

=== MLA years ===
After the 1981 election, she spent the next three years as the only New Democrat, and the only woman in the House of Assembly. She took on the "old boys' network", that permeated Nova Scotia's politics at the time, by attempting to dismantle the province's entrenched patronage system. McDonough was personally popular throughout Nova Scotia, consistently being the electors' top choice in leadership polls, but her personal popularity did not extend to the party. She led the party through three more elections, eventually building the caucus up to three members: all from the mainland, including future Nova Scotia NDP leader, Robert Chisholm. Following her fourteen years as the Nova Scotia NDP leader–which, at the time, made her the senior incumbent leader of a major political party in Canada–she stepped down on November 19, 1994. John Holm, the NDP's Sackville-Cobequid MLA, took over as interim leader, until Chisholm was elected leader in 1996. She remained a member of the NDP's legislative caucus until she resigned from the House of Assembly on October 20, 1995.

== Federal leadership ==
As the fortunes of the Nova Scotia NDP were slowly rising during the mid-1990s, the same could not be said of its federal counterpart. The 1993 Canadian federal election was an unmitigated disaster for the NDP. Under Audrey McLaughlin's leadership, the party suffered, to that date, its worst defeat since 1961 when it was founded. When looking at the popular vote, it was the worst ever election for a federal social-democratic party in the 20th century, with just seven percent of the vote. The party only had nine seats, three short of the twelve seats needed to have official party status in the House of Commons, and all the extra funding, research, office space and Question Period privileges it accords.

=== 1995 NDP leadership election ===
Following the 1993 election, the party embarked on a transformative journey, undertaking a comprehensive reform of its policies and purpose. On April 18, 1994, McLaughlin announced her intention to step down as leader by 1996. However, McLaughlin, confronted with internal strife akin to the challenges faced by the Nova Scotia party in 1980, advanced her departure from the end of 1996 to the end of 1995.

Amidst a toxic internal party atmosphere, McDonough entered the leadership race on May 30, 1995. The circumstances were reminiscent of her initial leadership campaign in 1980, characterized by a deeply divided party. Nevertheless, the party was additionally constrained by the unpopular provincial New Democratic Party (NDP) governments in Ontario and British Columbia. Notably, the NDP had suffered substantial losses in these two provinces at the federal level in 1993, losing all of its Ontario members of parliament (MPs) and all but two of its British Columbia MPs, representing more than half of its caucus.

The 1995 leadership election deviated from previous conventions in its implementation of six regional primary votes prior to the convention. For candidates to be eligible for the convention, they were required to either secure 15 percent of the total vote or emerge victorious in one of the regional primaries. This filter narrowed the field to only three candidates for the convention. However, the primaries did not directly select delegates to the convention. Instead, constituency associations and labour affiliates were responsible for this delegation selection, as was the customary practice during previous conventions.

McDonough's candidacy received support from the party establishment, particularly from former Ontario leader Stephen Lewis and his labour leader brother, Michael Lewis. Despite this establishment backing, she was widely perceived as an underdog by media outlets such as The Globe and Mail prior to the NDP leadership convention vote in Ottawa. The primary votes placed her behind leading contenders Svend Robinson and Lorne Nystrom, as she only secured victory in the Atlantic Canada primary and finished third in the remaining regions.

However, on October 14, 1995, during the convention, McDonough secured second place on the first ballot, surpassing Nystrom in a nearly three-way split of delegates. Although Robinson had won the first ballot, he believed that the majority of Nystrom's supporters would support her on the second ballot, ultimately securing her victory. Consequently, he conceded to McDonough before a second ballot could be held. On a motion moved by Robinson and seconded by Nystrom, the convention formally recognized McDonough as the party's new leader. She became the first person from Atlantic Canada to lead a major party since Robert Stanfield retired as the Progressive Conservatives' leader in 1976. Unusually for a major-party leader, she refrained from having one of her MPs resign to secure entry into Parliament through a by-election, opting instead to make a third bid for her home electoral district of Halifax in the subsequent general election.

=== 1997 federal election and the 'Third Way' ===
In the 1997 election, her first as leader, the party won 21 seats. This included a historic breakthrough in the Atlantic provinces, a region where it had only won three seats in its entire history prior to 1997. McDonough herself won Halifax by 11,000 votes, pushing Liberal incumbent Mary Clancy into third place. She would continue to win it consecutively three more times until she retired from politics in 2008.

During the next few years, McDonough's leadership of the party elicited controversy. Union leaders were lukewarm in their support of her, often threatening to break away from the NDP, in particular the Canadian Auto Workers' president Buzz Hargrove. She was widely seen within the NDP as trying to pull the party toward the centre of the political spectrum, in the Third Way mode of Tony Blair. Although when she made her leader's speech at the party's August 1999 Ottawa policy convention, she attempted to distance herself from "Third Way" policies by stating: "We must lay out a new way for Canadians to navigate in the 21st century. Not an old way, not a 'third way', but a made-in-Canada way...." Part of her proposal to move the party to the centre-left would include tax cuts – a move that prompted Ontario Conservative premier Mike Harris, to send a controversial letter of support for the debates on tax cuts that did not please many delegates. A vote on a resolution to adopt Third Way policies in the party's platform formally was defeated, as many union leaders opposed it and McDonough's "Canadian Way".

The Canadian Alliance and its new leader, Stockwell Day, presented a further challenge to McDonough's NDP. Fearful of the prospect of an Alliance government, many NDP supporters moved to the Liberals. As well, two NDP MPs, Angela Vautour and Rick Laliberte, crossed the floor to other party caucuses, reducing the NDP caucus to 19 seats. In the 2000 federal election, the NDP was held to just 13 seats, and its 8.5 percent of the popular vote, was near its historic low from the 1993 campaign. About the only solace the NDP and McDonough could take from the 2000 campaign was that they kept official party status in the House of Commons (if only barely), unlike McLaughlin in the 1993 campaign.

=== NPI/NDProgress and the 2001 Winnipeg Convention ===
After the disappointing performance in the 2000 federal election, there were more calls for party renewal. Some party activists perceived that the NDP had moved to the centre of the political spectrum and wanted to change that by bringing in social/political activists outside of the parliamentary process. They called their movement the New Politics Initiative, or NPI. Another group, called NDProgress, wanted to reform the party's internal structures, with procedural changes to how leaders were elected and limiting how much control Labour Unions had in the party. The NPI proposal to create a new party from the ashes of the NDP, was opposed by McDonough, and by former NDP leader, Ed Broadbent. The NPI resolution was voted down when it was presented at the party's November 2001 Winnipeg policy convention. NDProgress's resolution to have a "one member one vote" election for party leader, with a provision to limit organized labour's allotment of ballots to a maximum of 25 percent, passed. The 2001 Winnipeg convention was also where McDonough easily defeated a leadership challenge by Socialist Caucus member Marcel Hatch, who was also an NPI supporter.

=== Battle to repatriate Mahar Arar ===
The issue that highlighted McDonough's federal leadership occurred during the twilight of her career: the fight against Islamophobia and general anti-Arab sentiment, which swept through Canada and the United States in the wake of the 9/11 attacks in September 2001. She led the charge on the national scene to repatriate Mahar Arar, an Arab-Canadian who was wrongly detained as a terrorist by United States border officials, on an erroneous tip from Canada's secret service. Throughout 2002 and 2003, McDonough campaigned for his release. When he was released, his wife, Monia Mazigh, joined the NDP and became a candidate for them in the 2004 federal election, out of recognition for the support McDonough and the party showed for her and her husband.

=== 2002—2008 new leadership ===
With Brian Masse's May 2002 by-election victory, in the Windsor West riding, the party's caucus grew to 14 members. A few weeks later, on June 5, 2002, McDonough used this positive turn in electoral fortunes to announce that she was stepping down as NDP leader. On January 25, 2003, at the Toronto leadership convention, she was succeeded by Jack Layton. She was re-elected to Parliament in the 2004 federal election and again in 2006. In the NDP's shadow cabinet, McDonough served as the critic for International Development, International Cooperation and Peace Advocacy.

== Retirement ==
On June 2, 2008, McDonough announced that she would not run again in the riding of Halifax in the next federal election. She made the announcement at the Lord Nelson Hotel, the same place where she celebrated her 1997 victory as the MP for Halifax. McDonough said that she would continue on as the MP for Halifax until the next federal election.

On June 29, 2009, it was announced that McDonough was named the new interim president of Mount Saint Vincent University, in Halifax, Nova Scotia. Her one-year appointment began in August 2009. It was announced on December 30, 2009, that she was to be appointed an officer of the Order of Canada for her pioneering work as both the Nova Scotia and Federal leader of the New Democratic Party. She received an honorary Doctor of Civil Laws degree from Acadia University, in Wolfville, Nova Scotia on May 13, 2012.

== Personal life and death ==
McDonough's only marriage was in 1966 to Halifax lawyer, Peter McDonough (April 1, 1940 – November 17, 2021), with whom she had two sons: Justin and Travis. In 1993, she separated from McDonough, later divorcing him; she said her political career did not play a part in it. In 1994, just before she stepped down as Nova Scotia leader, she had a hysterectomy, and waited until she recuperated before she announced her resignation.

During her time as leader of the federal NDP, McDonough was romantically involved with David MacDonald, a former Progressive Conservative (PC) MP for Toronto Centre—Rosedale and a cabinet minister. MacDonald ran as the NDP candidate in Toronto Centre—Rosedale in the 1997 election but did not manage to get elected. In the previous election, he was the PC incumbent, and like every other PC candidate in Ontario in 1993, was defeated. The pair split up prior to the 2004 federal election.

On May 3, 2013, McDonough announced that she had been diagnosed with breast cancer about four months earlier during a mammogram. She had been receiving treatment. McDonough died at a long-term care home in Halifax, on January 15, 2022, at the age of 77. She suffered from Alzheimer's disease in the seven years prior to her death.

== Electoral record ==
2006 Canadian federal election: Halifax
Party	Candidate	Votes	%	±%	Expenditures
New Democratic	Alexa McDonough	23,420	46.88	+5.33	$67,353.61
Liberal	Martin MacKinnon	15,437	30.90	-8.22	$62,643.27
Conservative	Andrew House	8,993	18.00	+3.37	$73,744.64
Green	Nick Wright	1,948	3.90	-0.81	$861.16
Marxist–Leninist	Tony Seed	164	0.33	–	none listed
Total valid votes/expense limit		49,962	99.58		$77,542
Total rejected, unmarked and declined ballots		209	0.42	-0.17	
Turnout		50,171	65.25	+2.58	
Eligible voters		76,885			
New Democratic hold		Swing		+6.77	

2004 Canadian federal election: Halifax
Party	Candidate	Votes	%	±%	Expenditures
New Democratic	Alexa McDonough	18,341	41.55	-0.01	$64,636.07
Liberal	Sheila Fougere	17,267	39.11	+7.25	$61,349.27
Conservative	Kevin Keefe	6,457	14.63	-9.19	$61,519.35
Green	Michael Oddy	2,081	4.71		none listed
Total valid votes/expense limit		44,146	99.41		$73,393
Total rejected, unmarked and declined ballots		260	0.59		
Turnout		44,406	62.68		
Eligible voters		70,847			
New Democratic notional hold		Swing		-3.63	
Changes from 2000 are based on redistributed results. Conservative Party change is based on the combination of Canadian Alliance and Progressive Conservative Party totals.

2000 Canadian federal election: Halifax
Party	Candidate	Votes	%	±%
New Democratic	Alexa McDonough	16,563	40.36	-8.66
Liberal	Kevin Little	13,539	32.99	+11.36
Progressive Conservative	Paul Fitzgibbons	7,255	17.68	-5.58
Alliance	Amery Boyer	2,348	5.72	+0.28
Marijuana	Mike Patriquen	627	1.53	
Green	Michael Oddy	590	1.44	
Marxist–Leninist	Kevin Dumont Corkill	113	0.28	+0.08
Total valid votes		41,035	99.57	
Total rejected, unmarked and declined ballots		176	0.43	-0.14
Turnout		41,211	60.74	-8.11
Eligible voters		67,849		
New Democratic hold		Swing		-10.01

Changes for the Canadian Alliance from 1997 are based on the results of its predecessor, the Reform Party. Source:

1997 Canadian federal election: Halifax
Party	Candidate	Votes	%	±%
New Democratic	Alexa McDonough	21,837	49.02	+36.80
Progressive Conservative	Terry Donahoe	10,361	23.26	+1.63
Liberal	Mary Clancy	9,638	21.64	-25.78
Reform	Steve Greene	2,422	5.44	-8.31
Natural Law	Gilles Bigras	197	0.44	
Marxist–Leninist	Tony Seed	89	0.20	
Total valid votes		44,544	99.44	
Total rejected, unmarked and declined ballots		252	0.56	
Turnout		44,796	68.85	
Eligible voters		65,061		
New Democratic notional gain from Liberal		Swing		+31.29

1980 Canadian federal election: Halifax
Party	Candidate	Votes	%	±%
Liberal	Gerald Regan	16,949	41.63	+1.21
Progressive Conservative	George Cooper	15,710	38.58	-1.87
New Democratic	Alexa McDonough	8,009	19.67	+1.14
Marxist–Leninist	Charles Spurr	48	0.12	+0.05
Total valid votes		40,716	99.47	
Total rejected, unmarked and declined ballots		218	0.53	
Turnout		40,934	67.77	
Eligible voters		60,405		
Liberal gain from Progressive Conservative		Swing		+1.54

1979 Canadian federal election: Halifax
Party	Candidate	Votes	%	±%
Progressive Conservative	George Cooper	16,570	40.45	-8.80
Liberal	Brian Flemming	16,555	40.42	-0.28
New Democratic	Alexa McDonough	7,590	18.53	+9.20
Independent	David F. Gray	155	0.38	
Communist	D. Scott Milsom	64	0.16	
Marxist–Leninist	Tony Seed	27	0.07	-0.18
Total valid votes		40,961	100.00	
Progressive Conservative hold		Swing		-4.26
