= Gordon Benjamin Isnor =

Canadian merchant and politician

The Hon. Gordon Benjamin Isnor

Member of the Nova Scotia House of Assembly
- In office 1928–1935

Member of the Canadian Parliament for Halifax
- In office 1935–1950 Serving with Robert Emmett Finn (1935–1940); William Chisholm Macdonald (1940-1947); John Dickey (1947-1950)
- Preceded by: Felix Patrick Quinn; William Anderson Black
- Succeeded by: Samuel Rosborough Balcom

Senator for Halifax-Dartmouth, Nova Scotia
- In office 1950–1973
- Appointed by: Louis St. Laurent

Personal details
- Born: 10 May 1885 Dartmouth, Nova Scotia
- Died: 17 March 1973 (aged 87)
- Party: Liberal
- Committees: Chair, Special Committee on War Expenditures and Economies (1946); Chair, Standing Committee on Tourist Traffic (1955-1965)

Gordon Benjamin Isnor (10 May 1885 – 17 March 1973) was a Canadian merchant and parliamentarian.

A Liberal, he was elected four consecutive times to the House of Commons of Canada as the Member of Parliament representing the Nova Scotia electoral district of Halifax. He was first elected in the Canadian federal election of 1935, and was re-elected in 1940, 1945, and 1949.

On 28 July 1955, he was appointed to the Senate of Canada on the recommendation of Louis St-Laurent, and represented the senatorial division of Halifax-Dartmouth until his death.

Outside of his political life, Isnor was a successful Halifax businessman and operated a chain of clothing stores bearing his name in Nova Scotia. A street in Dartmouth, Nova Scotia was named after him, as well a senior citizens home in Halifax, the Gordon B. Isnor Manor.

== Electoral record ==
1949 Canadian federal election: Halifax
Party	Candidate	Votes	%	±%	Elected
Liberal	Gordon Benjamin Isnor	33,401	29.33		✓
Liberal	John Horace Dickey	31,627	27.77	+5.28	✓
Progressive Conservative	Joseph Patrick Connolly	18,826	16.53		
Progressive Conservative	Frederick William Bissett	18,223	16.00		
Co-operative Commonwealth	Hyacinth Lawrence MacIntosh	6,018	5.28		
Co-operative Commonwealth	Lloyd R. Shaw	5,777	5.07	-3.44	
Total valid votes		113,872	99.71		
Total rejected, unmarked and declined ballots		329	0.29		
Turnout			≥62.88	+1.30	
Eligible voters		90,803			
Liberal notional hold		Swing		+2.45	

^ Individual swings calculated from 1945 election. Party swing calculated from 1947 by-election.

1945 Canadian federal election: Halifax
Party	Candidate	Votes	%	±%	Elected
Liberal	Gordon Benjamin Isnor	26,407	25.15	+3.25	✓
Liberal	William Chisholm MacDonald	23,616	22.49	-2.45	✓
Progressive Conservative	Henry P. MacKeen	18,182	17.31		
Progressive Conservative	Gerald Dwyer	18,037	17.18		
Co-operative Commonwealth	Lloyd R. Shaw	8,937	8.51		
Co-operative Commonwealth	R. Leo Rooney	8,783	8.36		
Labor–Progressive	R. Charles Murray	560	0.53		
Independent	O.R. Regan	488	0.46		
Total valid votes		105,010	100.00		
Turnout			≥61.58	-3.15	
Eligible voters		85,262			
Liberal notional hold		Swing		+3.65	

1940 Canadian federal election: Halifax
Party	Candidate	Votes	%	±%	Elected
Liberal	William Chisholm MacDonald	22,089	24.94		✓
Liberal	Gordon Benjamin Isnor	19,398	21.90	-6.28	✓
National Government	Richard A. Donahoe	18,197	20.54		
National Government	Charles B. Smith	18,114	20.45		
Independent Liberal	Robert Emmett Finn	9,217	10.41	-16.78	
Co-operative Commonwealth	Helgi I.S. Borgford	1,561	1.76		
Total valid votes		88,576	100.00		
Turnout			≥64.73	-6.13	
Eligible voters		68,422			
Liberal notional hold		Swing		-9.09	

1935 Canadian federal election: Halifax
Party	Candidate	Votes	%	±%	Elected
Liberal	Gordon Benjamin Isnor	24,158	28.18		✓
Liberal	Robert Emmett Finn	23,312	27.19		✓
Conservative	Robert D. Guilford	13,624	15.89		
Conservative	Louis A. Gastonguay	13,250	15.45		
Reconstruction	John Furlong	6,307	7.36		
Reconstruction	John Joseph Power	5,091	5.94		
Total valid votes		85,742	100.00		
Turnout			≥70.86	-5.82	
Eligible voters		60,503			
Liberal notional gain from Conservative		Swing		+14.63	
