= Joe Wallace =

Canadian poet

Joseph Sylvester Wallace
- Born: 29 October 1890; Toronto, Ontario
- Died: 1 December 1975 (aged 85); Vancouver, British Columbia
- Occupation: Poet
- Spouse(s): Therese Dorothy (Dot) Granville, Grace Beardsley
- Parent(s): Thomas Wallace, Mary (Polly) Redmond

Joe Wallace (born Joseph Sylvester Wallace, 29 October 1890 – 1 December 1975) was a Canadian poet, journalist, and communist activist. As a poet, he was briefly affiliated with The Song Fishermen, an informal group of poets from Atlantic Canada. Wallace enjoyed a limited reputation in Canadian literature, but he had a direct influence on better known poets with strong political views, such as Dorothy Livesay and Milton Acorn. From the 1950s until after his death, Wallace was almost certainly the best-known Canadian poet in Eastern Europe and China.

== Biography ==
On 29 October 1890, Joe Wallace was born in Toronto to Thomas Wallace, a travelling salesman, and Mary (Polly) Redmond. He was the fourth of seven children. His mother died in 1897, due to complications related to childbirth. After remarrying, his father moved the family to Nova Scotia, where they lived in Truro, North Sydney, and Halifax. At the age of eleven, Wallace ran away from home. His father, in response, sent his son to St. Patrick's Catholic Home for Boys. He then attended high school in North Sydney before going around 1910 to St. Francis Xavier University, from which he was expelled two years later. He remained a practising Catholic for the rest of his life.

His brother got him a job working for the International Correspondence School in Newfoundland. After Wallace transferred to Halifax, he became the district manager. In 1916 he went to work for his brother in the Wallace Advertising Service and continued to work in this field successfully until 1933.

In 1915, he married Therese Dorothy (Dot) Granville. They had four children. In 1925, his five-year-old daughter died; in 1927, his wife died. In 1928, he married Grace Beardsley, but they soon separated.

Wallace was active in Halifax in the Young Men's Liberal Club, but by 1920 he had resigned to join the local Independent Labour Party. In the provincial election that year, he received 3,409 votes and finished in tenth place as one of the four Labour candidates in the four-member Halifax constituency. In the 1933 provincial election, he ran in Halifax Centre on the United Front ticket but received only 146 votes. As one of two Labour candidates in Halifax in the 1921 federal election, he received 3,763 votes.

In 1922, Wallace joined the Communist Party of Canada (CPC). He wrote articles, essays, and poems for Canadian Communist newspapers, including the Worker (1922–1936), the Daily Clarion (1936–1939), and the Canadian Tribune (1940–1975). In 1936 he moved to Toronto to write for Daily Clarion. He also worked in Ottawa and Montréal as an organizer for the Canadian Labour Defence League.

Following 1940, when Mackenzie King invoked the War Measures Act, making Communist activities effectively illegal, more than 100 leftists were arrested and placed in internment camps. Wallace was imprisoned between 8 March 1941 and October 1942.

For eight years I worked with my hands. This was not a degrading experience for me. I felt, and still feel, that a poet should do manual labor. He should be given this chance to meet all classes of people. He must live and work with the masses if he is to be a poet at all

— Joe Wallace, 1960

After his time in prison, Wallace released his first volume of poetry, Night Is Ended (1942), which included personal and political poems, some of them written during his internment in Hull. The book included an endorsement by Canadian poet E.J. Pratt. Wallace then trained to support the war effort by working as a lathe operator at Ferranti Electric in Toronto, where he helped organize a union. After the war, he found work as a hospital caretaker.

In 1952, he helped establish the literary magazine New Frontiers and served as one of the first members of the editorial committee. The magazine survived for five years. During this time he also published a small collection, All My Brothers (1953), which the critic Northrop Frye said was "sometimes laboured" and "sometimes also clear and precise" and "demonstrated the sheer intensity of the Marxist view of the capitalist world." Another small collection, Hi Sister, Hi Brother! (1956) followed.

In early 1957, Wallace traveled to the Soviet Union and the People's Republic of China and spent ten months there. He found his poetry known and appreciated. An anthology of his work was published in Moscow in 1958. He returned in 1960, staying until 1963, and another book was published there in 1964. His books circulated in thousands of copies in both English and Russian.

In 1968, Wallace moved to Vancouver. On 1 December 1975, he died of a heart attack.

== Legacy ==
In 1981, Progress Books prepared a selected edition of his works, titled Joe Wallace Poems.

In 2010, two of his poems ('The Five Point Star' and 'All My Brothers Are Beautiful') were anthologized in Brian Trehearne's 'Canadian Poetry: 1920–1960.

Some of his poems have been set to music, including "O Lovely Land" and "Making Hay." One early poem, "The Voice of the Worker", is set to music and performed by folklorist Richard MacKinnon on the CD "Songs of Steel, Coal and Protest."

A short documentary film about Wallace, by filmmaker Sara Wylie (Wallace's great-great-niece) was released in 2022, under the title A More Radiant Sphere.

== Electoral record ==
1921 Canadian federal election: Halifax
Party	Candidate	Votes	%	Elected
Liberal	Edward Blackadder	16,157	26.70	✓
Liberal	Alexander Kenneth Maclean	15,892	26.27	✓
Conservative	Hector McInnes	11,016	18.21	
Conservative	James Wilfred Doyle	9,537	15.76	
Labour	Arthur Charles Hawkins	4,141	6.84	
Labour	Joseph Sylvester Wallace	3,763	6.22	
Total valid votes		60,506	100.00	
Source(s) "Halifax (1867- )". History of Federal Ridings Since 1867. Library of Parliament. Two members were elected from the district.

== Bibliography ==
- Night Is Ended (1942)
- All My Brothers (1953)
- Hi, Sister, Hi, Brother! (1956)
- The Golden Legend (1958), an anthology of Wallace's poems compiled by the Foreign Languages Publishing House in Moscow after his first visit there.
- A Radiant Sphere (1964), including poetic reworks of translations from the work of selected Russian poets.
- Joe Wallace Poems (1981)
