= Lloyd R. Shaw =

Canadian businessman and politician (1914–1993)

Lloyd R. Shaw CM
- Born: February 7, 1914; Annapolis Royal, Nova Scotia
- Died: October 16, 1993 (aged 79); Halifax, Nova Scotia
- Education: Columbia University
- Political party: New Democratic Party (1961–); Co-operative Commonwealth Federation (1933–1961)
- Children: Alexa McDonough

Military service
- Branch/service: Royal Canadian Air Force
- Battles/wars: Second World War

Lloyd Robert Shaw CM (February 7, 1914 – October 16, 1993) was a Canadian businessman, political activist and organizer, a member of the Order of Canada, and father of the late Nova Scotia New Democratic Party and federal New Democratic Party leader Alexa McDonough.

== Life and career ==
Shaw was born in Annapolis Royal, Nova Scotia, to Lloyd E. Shaw and wife Lillian Morse, owners of L. E. Shaw Ltd, brickmakers. Earning a Master of Arts degree in Economics from Columbia University, Shaw went to teach in the schools throughout the Annapolis Valley. It is suggested that while at Columbia Shaw became interested in socialism, a course which would direct the remainder of his life. Shaw also worked with the YMCA in Halifax and Ottawa.

While in Ottawa Shaw was very important in the founding of Carleton University, becoming the university's first registrar. It is in Ottawa where Shaw met many of the founders of the Co-operative Commonwealth Federation. When the CCF officially formed in 1933 Shaw became the political party's first national research director. In the mid-1940s Shaw and his family returned to Nova Scotia, where he held the position of provincial secretary of the Nova Scotia wing of the CCF until 1949.

During World War II Shaw enlisted in the Royal Canadian Air Force and spent the war as a flight sergeant. It is after the war that Shaw took over the family business as CEO of L.E. Shaw Ltd. He held the position of CEO until 1979 when he retired at the age of 65.

Shaw was involved in many community and business organizations. He held the position of director of the Nova Scotia Savings and Loan Company, member of the executive council of the Canadian Manufacturers' Association and at one point was vice-president of the Atlantic Provinces Economic Council. Shaw also worked tirelessly for community groups including Veterans Against Nuclear Arms and Elderhostel.

Shaw received the degree Member of the Order of Canada in 1993. Throughout his career Shaw was honoured numerous times with honorary degrees from such institutions as Acadia University, Dalhousie University, St. Francis Xavier University and the Nova Scotia Technical College.

Shaw died on October 16, 1993, at the age of 79 in Halifax, Nova Scotia after a four-year-long battle with Alzheimer's disease.

Shaw's daughter Alexa McDonough, by his marriage to Jean MacKinnon, followed in her father's political footsteps, becoming the first female leader of the provincial party in 1981 when she became leader of the Nova Scotia New Democratic Party, and leader of the federal party in 1995. Shaw himself ran for the CCF in the 1945 and 1949 federal elections and in a federal byelection in 1948, and for the NDP in the 1974 federal election, but was never elected to the House of Commons of Canada.

== Electoral results ==
1974 Canadian federal election: Halifax—East Hants
| Party | Candidate | Votes |
|---|---|---|
| Progressive Conservative | Bob McCleave | 25,563 |
| Liberal | Bill Ozard | 18,308 |
| New Democratic | Lloyd R. Shaw | 5,861 |
| Social Credit | Robert Kirk | 204 |
| Marxist–Leninist | Robert Andstein | 113 |

1949 Canadian federal election: Halifax
| Party | Candidate | Votes | % | ±% | Elected |
|---|---|---|---|---|---|
| Liberal | Gordon Benjamin Isnor | 33,401 | 29.33 | | ✓ |
| Liberal | John Horace Dickey | 31,627 | 27.77 | +5.28 | ✓ |
| Progressive Conservative | Joseph Patrick Connolly | 18,826 | 16.53 | | |
| Progressive Conservative | Frederick William Bissett | 18,223 | 16.00 | | |
| Co-operative Commonwealth | Hyacinth Lawrence MacIntosh | 6,018 | 5.28 | | |
| Co-operative Commonwealth | Lloyd R. Shaw | 5,777 | 5.07 | -3.44 | |
| Total valid votes | | 113,872 | 99.71 | | |
| Total rejected, unmarked and declined ballots | | 329 | 0.29 | | |
| Turnout | | | ≥62.88 | +1.30 | |
| Eligible voters | | 90,803 | | | |
| Liberal notional hold | | Swing | | +2.45 | |

^ Individual swings calculated from 1945 election. Party swing calculated from 1947 by-election.

1945 Canadian federal election: Halifax
| Party | Candidate | Votes | % | ±% | Elected |
|---|---|---|---|---|---|
| Liberal | Gordon Benjamin Isnor | 26,407 | 25.15 | +3.25 | ✓ |
| Liberal | William Chisholm MacDonald | 23,616 | 22.49 | -2.45 | ✓ |
| Progressive Conservative | Henry P. MacKeen | 18,182 | 17.31 | | |
| Progressive Conservative | Gerald Dwyer | 18,037 | 17.18 | | |
| Co-operative Commonwealth | Lloyd R. Shaw | 8,937 | 8.51 | | |
| Co-operative Commonwealth | R. Leo Rooney | 8,783 | 8.36 | | |
| Labor–Progressive | R. Charles Murray | 560 | 0.53 | | |
| Independent | O.R. Regan | 488 | 0.46 | | |
| Total valid votes | | 105,010 | 100.00 | | |
| Turnout | | | ≥61.58 | -3.15 | |
| Eligible voters | | 85,262 | | | |
| Liberal notional hold | | Swing | | +3.65 | |
