= William Chisholm Macdonald =

Canadian politician

Member of Parliament for Halifax
- In office March 1940 – November 1946
- Preceded by: Robert Emmett Finn
- Succeeded by: John Dickey

Personal details
- Born: William Chisholm Macdonald; 6 May 1890 Bailey's Brook, Pictou County, Nova Scotia, Canada
- Died: 19 November 1946 (aged 56) Halifax, Nova Scotia, Canada
- Party: Liberal
- Profession: barrister

William Chisholm Macdonald (6 May 1890 – 19 November 1946) was a Liberal party member of the House of Commons of Canada. He was born in Bailey's Brook, Nova Scotia and became a barrister by career.

He was first elected to Parliament at the Halifax riding in the 1940 general election and re-elected in 1945. Macdonald died on 19 November 1946 before completing his term in the 20th Canadian Parliament.

== Electoral results ==
1945 Canadian federal election: Halifax
Party	Candidate	Votes	%	±%	Elected
Liberal	Gordon Benjamin Isnor	26,407	25.15	+3.25	✓
Liberal	William Chisholm MacDonald	23,616	22.49	-2.45	✓
Progressive Conservative	Henry P. MacKeen	18,182	17.31		
Progressive Conservative	Gerald Dwyer	18,037	17.18		
Co-operative Commonwealth	Lloyd R. Shaw	8,937	8.51		
Co-operative Commonwealth	R. Leo Rooney	8,783	8.36		
Labor–Progressive	R. Charles Murray	560	0.53		
Independent	O.R. Regan	488	0.46		
Total valid votes		105,010	100.00		
Turnout			≥61.58	-3.15	
Eligible voters		85,262			
Liberal notional hold		Swing		+3.65	

1940 Canadian federal election: Halifax
Party	Candidate	Votes	%	±%	Elected
Liberal	William Chisholm MacDonald	22,089	24.94		✓
Liberal	Gordon Benjamin Isnor	19,398	21.90	-6.28	✓
National Government	Richard A. Donahoe	18,197	20.54		
National Government	Charles B. Smith	18,114	20.45		
Independent Liberal	Robert Emmett Finn	9,217	10.41	-16.78	
Co-operative Commonwealth	Helgi I.S. Borgford	1,561	1.76		
Total valid votes		88,576	100.00		
Turnout			≥64.73	-6.13	
Eligible voters		68,422			
Liberal notional hold		Swing		-9.09	
