= George Cooper (Canadian politician) =

Canadian politician

George Cooper CM, CD, KC

Member of Parliament for Halifax
- In office May 1979 – February 1980
- Preceded by: Robert Stanfield
- Succeeded by: Gerald Regan

Personal details
- Born: George Thomas Hendery Cooper; 24 June 1941 (age 84) Halifax, Nova Scotia
- Party: Progressive Conservative
- Profession: lawyer

George Thomas Hendery Cooper CM CD KC (born 24 June 1941 in Halifax, Nova Scotia) was a Progressive Conservative party member of the House of Commons of Canada. He was a lawyer.

He was elected to Parliament at the Halifax riding in the 1979 general election. He served one federal term in office, the 31st Canadian Parliament, during which he was parliamentary secretary for the Attorney General and the Minister of Justice. In the 1980 federal election, Cooper was defeated by Gerald Regan of the Liberals.

Cooper was the first Canadian Chair of the Foundation for Educational Exchange between Canada and the United States. He helped inaugurate Fulbright scholarships for outstanding students and academics to enhance mutual understanding between our two countries.

In 1986, Cooper was tasked with investigating whether the Canadian government's funding of Donald Ewen Cameron and the Allan Memorial Institute, where an unknown number of psychiatric patients in Montreal were unwittingly experimented on as a part of Project MKUltra, could be considered "illegal or improper." In this investigation Cooper only interviewed government officials, excluding the late Dr. Cameron's colleagues and former patients from the report. He found that the Canadian government had "no legal or moral responsibility for the activities of Dr. D. Ewen Cameron" and that "the CIA was only involved in funding and was not involved in instigating, directing and controlling Cameron's work; and that Cameron was simply applying treatments of a kind which...had become standard practice for him." The Canadian government used the findings of the Cooper Report as evidence of their innocence in the Allan Memorial Institute experiments as recently as 2018.

He was managing partner with the Law firm McInnes Cooper in the 1990s and board chair from 2006 to 2012.

Cooper became the 24th President and Vice-Chancellor of the University of King's College on 9 July 2012. He concluded his term on 30 June 2016.

June 2017, Cooper was awarded the University of Calgary's highest academic honour, the Doctor of Laws.

== Electoral record ==
1980 Canadian federal election: Halifax
Party	Candidate	Votes	%	±%
Liberal	Gerald Regan	16,949	41.63	+1.21
Progressive Conservative	George Cooper	15,710	38.58	-1.87
New Democratic	Alexa McDonough	8,009	19.67	+1.14
Marxist–Leninist	Charles Spurr	48	0.12	+0.05
Total valid votes		40,716	99.47	
Total rejected, unmarked and declined ballots		218	0.53	
Turnout		40,934	67.77	
Eligible voters		60,405		
Liberal gain from Progressive Conservative		Swing		+1.54

1979 Canadian federal election: Halifax
Party	Candidate	Votes	%	±%
Progressive Conservative	George Cooper	16,570	40.45	-8.80
Liberal	Brian Flemming	16,555	40.42	-0.28
New Democratic	Alexa McDonough	7,590	18.53	+9.20
Independent	David F. Gray	155	0.38	
Communist	D. Scott Milsom	64	0.16	
Marxist–Leninist	Tony Seed	27	0.07	-0.18
Total valid votes		40,961	100.00	
Progressive Conservative hold		Swing		-4.26
