= Stewart McInnes =

Canadian politician

The Honourable Stewart McInnes PC, QC

Member of Parliament for Halifax
- In office 1984–1988
- Preceded by: Gerald Regan
- Succeeded by: Mary Clancy

Personal details
- Born: Stewart Donald McInnes; July 24, 1937 Halifax, Nova Scotia, Canada
- Died: October 3, 2015 (aged 78) Halifax, Nova Scotia, Canada
- Party: Progressive Conservative
- Profession: Lawyer

Stewart Donald McInnes (July 24, 1937 – October 3, 2015) was a Canadian lawyer, arbitrator and federal politician.

== Education ==
In 1954, while studying at Dalhousie University, he became a brother in the Sigma Chi fraternity, who later named him a Significant Sig.

== Law career ==
From 1961 to 1999, McInnes was a senior partner in the Halifax, Nova Scotia law firm of McInnes Cooper, and appeared before the Supreme Court of Nova Scotia, the Federal Court of Canada and the Supreme Court of Canada. He also served as the president of the Nova Scotia branch of the Canadian Bar Association from 1983 to 1984.

== Political career ==
In the 1984 general election, he was elected to the House of Commons of Canada as the Progressive Conservative Member of Parliament for Halifax, defeating Liberal Cabinet minister and former Premier of Nova Scotia Gerald Regan.

In 1985, he was appointed to Prime Minister Brian Mulroney's cabinet as Minister of Supply and Services. From 1986 until 1988, he concurrently held the positions of Minister of Public Works and Minister responsible for CMHC.

McInnes was defeated in the 1988 federal election by Liberal Mary Clancy due, in part, to the unpopularity of the Canada–United States Free Trade Agreement in Atlantic Canada. He returned to his law practice full-time.

== After politics ==
He was a certified arbitrator and mediator and focused professionally in those areas after leaving politics. McInnes served as Director of the Arbitration and Mediation Institute of Canada from 1993 to 1995 and as director of the Atlantic Arbitration and Mediation Institute from 1993 to 1994. In 1996, he was on the International Mediation Centre’s advisory board, and in 1999, he was a panel member of the Canadian Foundation for Dispute Resolution. He has lectured and written extensively on the topic of mediation and arbitration.

After leaving the House of Commons, McInnes remained active in politics as a fundraiser for the Progressive Conservative Association of Nova Scotia.

McInnes died on October 3, 2015.

== Archives ==
There is a Stewart McInnes fonds at Library and Archives Canada.

== Electoral record ==
1988 Canadian federal election: Halifax
Party	Candidate	Votes	%	±%
Liberal	Mary Clancy	22,470	43.00	+8.64
Progressive Conservative	Stewart McInnes	19,840	37.97	-6.80
New Democratic	Ray Larkin	9,269	17.74	-2.71
Libertarian	Howard J. MacKinnon	292	0.56	
Communist	Miguel Figueroa	151	0.29	
Independent	Tony Seed	134	0.26	
Commonwealth of Canada	J. Basil MacDougall	94	0.18	
Total valid votes		52,250	100.00	
Liberal gain from Progressive Conservative		Swing		+7.72

1984 Canadian federal election: Halifax
Party	Candidate	Votes	%	±%
Progressive Conservative	Stewart McInnes	18,779	44.78	+6.19
Liberal	Gerald Regan	14,411	34.36	-7.27
New Democratic	Tessa Hebb	8,576	20.45	+0.78
Independent	Ignatius Kennedy	174	0.41	
Total valid votes		41,940	99.33	
Total rejected, unmarked and declined ballots		285	0.67	+0.14
Turnout		42,225	76.38	+8.61
Eligible voters		55,286		
Progressive Conservative gain from Liberal		Swing		+6.73
