= John Lloyd (Canadian politician) =

Canadian politician

John Edward Lloyd (2 August 1908 – 16 September 1985) was a Liberal party member of the House of Commons of Canada for the Halifax riding. He is a lecturer and chartered accountant by career. He was born in Aldershot, England.

After unsuccessfully campaigning for the riding in the 1962 federal election, he won the seat in the 1963 federal election and served in the 26th Canadian Parliament until 1965. He lost the seat to Progressive Conservative candidates in the 1965 federal election.

== Electoral record ==
1965 Canadian federal election: Halifax
Party	Candidate	Votes	%	±%	Elected
Progressive Conservative	Robert McCleave	46,007	25.08	+1.83	✓
Progressive Conservative	Michael Forrestall	40,983	22.34		✓
Liberal	John Lloyd	39,942	21.77	-3.52	
Liberal	Robert J. Butler	38,191	20.82		
New Democratic	Jim Aitchison	8,983	4.90		
New Democratic	Bruce Wallace	8,387	4.57		
Independent	Ignatius Jeriome Kennedy	950	0.52		
Total valid votes		183,443	100.00		
Progressive Conservative notional gain from Liberal		Swing		+4.39	

1963 Canadian federal election: Halifax
Party	Candidate	Votes	%	±%	Elected
Liberal	John Lloyd	46,274	25.29	+2.35	✓
Liberal	Gerald Regan	45,173	24.69	+2.21	✓
Progressive Conservative	Robert McCleave	42,548	23.25	-0.51	
Progressive Conservative	Finlay Macdonald	41,655	22.77		
New Democratic	Allan O'Brien	3,860	2.11		
New Democratic	Perry Ronayne	3,466	1.89	-1.23	
Total valid votes		182,976	100.00		
Liberal notional gain from Progressive Conservative		Swing		+2.72	

1962 Canadian federal election: Halifax
Party	Candidate	Votes	%	±%	Elected
Progressive Conservative	Robert McCleave	42,964	23.77	-6.28	✓
Progressive Conservative	Edmund L. Morris	41,804	23.12	-6.68	✓
Liberal	John Lloyd	41,472	22.94		
Liberal	Gerald A. Regan	40,635	22.48		
New Democratic	James H. Aitchison	6,464	3.58		
New Democratic	Perry Ronayne	5,653	3.13		
Social Credit	Robert J. Kuglin	1,784	0.99		
Total valid votes		180,776	100.00		
Progressive Conservative notional hold		Swing		-10.40	
