= Mary Clancy =

Canadian politician and lawyer

3rd President of Burlington College
- In office 2002–2003
- Preceded by: Daniel Casey
- Succeeded by: Jane O'Meara Sanders

Member of Parliament for Halifax
- In office 1988–1997
- Preceded by: Stewart McInnes
- Succeeded by: Alexa McDonough

Personal details
- Born: 13 January 1948 (age 78) Halifax, Nova Scotia
- Party: Liberal

Mary Catherine Clancy (born 13 January 1948) is a former Canadian politician and lawyer. She was the member of Parliament for the riding of Halifax from 1988 to 1997.

== Career ==
Clancy won the Halifax electoral district for the Liberal Party in the 1988 and 1993 federal elections. After serving in the 34th and 35th Canadian Parliaments, Clancy was defeated in the 1997 federal election by New Democratic Party leader Alexa McDonough.

Subsequently, in 1997, she was appointed Canadian Consul General to Boston.

From 2002 to 2003, Clancy was President of Burlington College in Burlington, Vermont.

== In popular culture ==
The 1997 federal election competition between Clancy and McDonough is the subject of the 1999 National Film Board documentary Why Women Run.

== Electoral record ==
1993 Canadian federal election: Halifax
Party	Candidate	Votes	%	±%
Liberal	Mary Clancy	21,326	45.91	+2.90
Progressive Conservative	Jim Vaughan	9,600	20.67	-17.31
Reform	Steve Greene	6,717	14.46	
New Democratic	Lynn Jones	6,214	13.38	-4.36
National	Charles Phillips	1,383	2.98	
Natural Law	Gilles Bigras	448	0.96	
Green	W. Vladimir Klonowski	307	0.66	
Independent	A.R. Art Canning	277	0.60	
Independent	Steve Rimek	99	0.21	
Marxist–Leninist	Tony Seed	84	0.18	-0.08
Total valid votes		46,455	99.06	
Total rejected, unmarked and declined ballots		439	0.94	
Turnout		46,894	58.94	
Eligible voters		79,568		
Liberal hold		Swing		+10.10

Changes for Marxist–Leninist candidate Tony Seed are based on his 1988 results, when he ran as an Independent.

1988 Canadian federal election: Halifax
Party	Candidate	Votes	%	±%
Liberal	Mary Clancy	22,470	43.00	+8.64
Progressive Conservative	Stewart McInnes	19,840	37.97	-6.80
New Democratic	Ray Larkin	9,269	17.74	-2.71
Libertarian	Howard J. MacKinnon	292	0.56	
Communist	Miguel Figueroa	151	0.29	
Independent	Tony Seed	134	0.26	
Commonwealth of Canada	J. Basil MacDougall	94	0.18	
Total valid votes		52,250	100.00	
Liberal gain from Progressive Conservative		Swing		+7.72
