= Robert McCleave =

Canadian politician

Robert Jardine McCleave
- Official 1974 portrait

Member of Parliament for Halifax
- In office June 1957 – April 1963
- In office November 1965 – June 1968

Member of Parliament for Halifax—East Hants
- In office June 1968 – December 1977

Personal details
- Born: 19 December 1922 Moncton, New Brunswick
- Died: 3 September 2004 (aged 81) Moncton, New Brunswick
- Party: Progressive Conservative
- Profession: Journalist, judge, lawyer

Robert Jardine McCleave (19 December 1922 – 3 September 2004) was a Progressive Conservative party member of the House of Commons of Canada. He was born in Moncton, New Brunswick, and became a journalist, judge and lawyer by career. He was also an editor of the Halifax Chronicle-Herald and became a news director at radio station CJCH. McCleave attended Dalhousie University, where he graduated in law studies.

He was first elected at the Halifax riding in the 1957 general election. Except for a defeat at that riding in the 1963 federal election, he was re-elected to Parliament until the 1974 federal election.

The Halifax riding was shared by two Members of Parliament until 1967. McCleave was joined by fellow Progressive Conservative member Edmund L. Morris from 1957 to 1963, then by Michael Forrestall, another Progressive Conservative, from 1965 to 1968. The Halifax riding was redefined in 1967 so that it elected only a single Member of Parliament, therefore McCleave campaigned in the Halifax—East Hants riding as of the 1968 federal election.

He left federal office after 8 December 1977, prior to the end of his term in the 30th Canadian Parliament and became a provincial court judge for the province of Nova Scotia, where he served for ten years.

== Electoral record ==
1962 Canadian federal election: Halifax
Party	Candidate	Votes	%	±%	Elected
Progressive Conservative	Robert McCleave	42,964	23.77	-6.28	✓
Progressive Conservative	Edmund L. Morris	41,804	23.12	-6.68	✓
Liberal	John Lloyd	41,472	22.94		
Liberal	Gerald A. Regan	40,635	22.48		
New Democratic	James H. Aitchison	6,464	3.58		
New Democratic	Perry Ronayne	5,653	3.13		
Social Credit	Robert J. Kuglin	1,784	0.99		
Total valid votes		180,776	100.00		
Progressive Conservative notional hold		Swing		-10.40	

1963 Canadian federal election: Halifax
Party	Candidate	Votes	%	±%	Elected
Liberal	John Lloyd	46,274	25.29	+2.35	✓
Liberal	Gerald Regan	45,173	24.69	+2.21	✓
Progressive Conservative	Robert McCleave	42,548	23.25	-0.51	
Progressive Conservative	Finlay Macdonald	41,655	22.77		
New Democratic	Allan O'Brien	3,860	2.11		
New Democratic	Perry Ronayne	3,466	1.89	-1.23	
Total valid votes		182,976	100.00		
Liberal notional gain from Progressive Conservative		Swing		+2.72	

1968 Canadian federal election: Halifax—East Hants
Party	Candidate	Votes
Progressive Conservative	Bob McCleave	22,323
Liberal	Alex J. Cregan	13,488
New Democratic	Burris Devanney	1,718

1972 Canadian federal election: Halifax—East Hants
Party	Candidate	Votes
Progressive Conservative	Bob McCleave	27,645
Liberal	Mary M. Casey	14,308
New Democratic	Donald Aube	5,530
Not affiliated	Barbara Joan Biley	135

1974 Canadian federal election: Halifax—East Hants
Party	Candidate	Votes
Progressive Conservative	Bob McCleave	25,563
Liberal	Bill Ozard	18,308
New Democratic	Lloyd R. Shaw	5,861
Social Credit	Robert Kirk	204
Marxist–Leninist	Robert Andstein	113
