= Peter Francis Martin =

Canadian politician (1856–1935)

Peter Francis Martin (January 13, 1856 – May 2, 1935) was a contractor and political figure in Nova Scotia, Canada. He represented Halifax in the House of Commons of Canada from 1917 to 1921 as a Unionist Party member. Martin was elected by acclamation in the Khaki Election of 1917; in Halifax, the election was postponed after the Halifax Explosion and Martin's Liberal opponent withdrew in a show of post-explosion unity. Martin replaced Prime Minister Robert Borden, who had run (and won) in Kings County. Martin sat for Halifax division in the Senate of Canada from 1921 to 1935 as a Conservative.

He was born in Halifax, Nova Scotia, the son of Francis Martin, and was educated there. Martin married Elizabeth C. Sullivan. He served 18 years on Halifax city council and was mayor from 1915 to 1918. The Halifax Explosion occurred during this term as mayor, although he was absent from the city when the explosion happened because he was campaigning with other Maritimes candidates for his parliamentary seat. Martin died in office in Halifax at the age of 79.

1917 Canadian federal election: Halifax
Party	Candidate	Votes	Elected
Government (Unionist)	Alexander Kenneth Maclean	acclaimed	✓
Government (Unionist)	Peter Francis Martin	acclaimed	✓
