= Halifax (federal electoral district) =

Federal electoral district in Nova Scotia, Canada

Nova Scotia electoral district
- Interactive map of riding boundaries from the 2025 federal election

Federal electoral district
- Legislature: House of Commons
MP
Shannon Miedema
Liberal
- District created: 1867
- First contested: 1867
- Last contested: 2025
- District webpage: profile, map

Demographics
- Population (2021): 107,010
- Electors (2025): 71,029
- Area (km²): 214.58
- Pop. density (per km²): 498.7
- Census division: Halifax
- Census subdivision: Halifax (part)

Halifax is a federal electoral district in Nova Scotia, Canada. It is one of a handful of ridings which has been represented continuously (albeit with different boundaries and different numbers of members) in the House of Commons since Confederation in 1867.

The riding of Halifax includes the communities of Spryfield, Sambro, Herring Cove, Harrietsfield, Williamswood, Prospect, Purcell's Cove, Armdale, Cowie Hill, Fairmount, Kline Heights, and the Halifax Peninsula.

== History ==
The electoral district was created at Confederation in 1867. It returned two members until 1968.

The most notable of the riding's MPs was Robert Borden, who was Conservative leader from 1901 to 1920, and Prime Minister of Canada from 1911 to 1920. Borden represented the riding from 1896 to 1904 and again from 1909 to 1917. Another notable MP was Robert Stanfield, leader of the Progressive Conservative Party from 1967 to 1976, who represented the riding from 1968 to 1979.

Halifax was represented by the New Democratic Party from 1997 to 2015, with the Liberal Party coming in second in every election from 2000 to 2015. The riding's boundaries were re-distributed in 2004. Before that date, it comprised the peninsula of Halifax, the community of Fairview, and part of Clayton Park.

Alexa McDonough stepped down as NDP leader in 2003, but stayed on to represent Halifax in the House of Commons. McDonough ran for re-election against popular city councillor Sheila Fougere in 2004, who came within 1000 votes of beating the incumbent. McDonough pulled ahead based in part on a strong showing in Halifax's North End. On 2 June 2008, McDonough announced that she would not seek re-election.

Following the 2012 redistribution, the riding gained a small part of the riding of Halifax West, on the eastern side of Long Lake Provincial Park.

Following the 2022 redistribution, the riding lost the Fairmount area to Halifax West.

== Demographics ==
Historical population
Year	Pop.	±%
2001	88,931	—
2006	89,448	+0.6%
2011	92,643	+3.6%
2016	94,610	+2.1%
2021	107,010	+13.1%

According to the 2021 Canadian census, 2023 representation order

Languages: 82.8% English, 3.1% French, 2.5% Mandarin, 1.8% Arabic, 1.1% Punjabi
Race: 73.9% White, 6.1% South Asian, 5.4% Black, 3.8% Chinese, 3.2% Indigenous, 2.4% Arab, 1.1% Filipino
Religions: 42.8% Christian (19.6% Catholic, 5.6% Anglican, 4.8% United Church, 2.3% Baptist, 10.6% other), 3.8% Muslim, 2.8% Hindu, 1.2% Sikh, 46.9% none
Median income: $38,400 (2020)
Average income: $52,900 (2020)

== Geography ==
The district includes the old City of Halifax except for the extreme western part, the area along the west coast of Halifax Harbour and along the Atlantic Ocean until Pennant. It also includes Sable Island. The area is 214.58 km^{2} (82.85 sq mi).

== Members of Parliament ==
Halifax was a two-member riding from 1867 to 1968, electing its members through block voting. Since the 1968 Canadian federal election, it has elected just one MP in each election, electing its member through first past the post.

This riding has elected the following members of Parliament:

2 member riding (1867–1968)
Parliament	Years	Member	Party	Member	Party
Halifax
1st	1867–1869	Alfred Gilpin Jones	Anti-Confederation	Patrick Power	Anti-Confederation
1st	1869–1870	Alfred Gilpin Jones	Independent	Patrick Power	Liberal
1st	1870–1872	Alfred Gilpin Jones	Independent	Patrick Power	Independent Liberal
2nd	1872–1874	William Johnston Almon	Liberal–Conservative	Stephen Tobin	Liberal
3rd	1874–1878	Patrick Power	Independent Liberal	Alfred Gilpin Jones	Independent
4th	1878–1882	Matthew Henry Richey	Liberal–Conservative	Malachy Bowes Daly	Liberal–Conservative
5th	1882–1883	Matthew Henry Richey	Liberal–Conservative	Malachy Bowes Daly	Liberal–Conservative
5th	1883–1887	John Fitzwilliam Stairs	Conservative	Malachy Bowes Daly	Liberal–Conservative
6th	1887–1891	Alfred Gilpin Jones	Liberal	Thomas Edward Kenny	Conservative
7th	1891–1896	John Fitzwilliam Stairs	Conservative	Thomas Edward Kenny	Conservative
8th	1896–1900	Robert Borden	Conservative	Benjamin Russell	Liberal
9th	1900–1904	Robert Borden	Conservative	William Roche	Liberal
10th	1904–1908	Michael Carney	Liberal	William Roche	Liberal
11th	1908–1911	Robert Borden	Conservative	Adam Brown Crosby	Conservative
12th	1911–1917	Robert Borden	Conservative	Alexander Kenneth Maclean	Liberal
13th	1917–1921	Peter Francis Martin	Government (Unionist)	Alexander Kenneth Maclean	Government (Unionist)
14th	1921–1922	Edward Blackadder	Liberal	Alexander Kenneth Maclean	Liberal
14th	1922–1923	Robert Emmett Finn	Liberal	Alexander Kenneth Maclean	Liberal
14th	1923–1925	Robert Emmett Finn	Liberal	William Anderson Black	Conservative
15th	1925–1926	Felix Patrick Quinn	Conservative	William Anderson Black	Conservative
16th	1926–1930	Felix Patrick Quinn	Conservative	William Anderson Black	Conservative
17th	1930–1935	Felix Patrick Quinn	Conservative	William Anderson Black	Conservative
18th	1935–1940	Gordon Benjamin Isnor	Liberal	Robert Emmett Finn	Liberal
19th	1940–1945	Gordon Benjamin Isnor	Liberal	William Chisholm Macdonald	Liberal
20th	1945–1947	Gordon Benjamin Isnor	Liberal	William Chisholm Macdonald	Liberal
20th	1947–1949	Gordon Benjamin Isnor	Liberal	John Dickey	Liberal
21st	1949–1950	Gordon Benjamin Isnor	Liberal	John Dickey	Liberal
21st	1950–1953	Samuel Rosborough Balcom	Liberal	John Dickey	Liberal
22nd	1953–1957	Samuel Rosborough Balcom	Liberal	John Dickey	Liberal
23rd	1957–1958	Robert McCleave	Progressive Conservative	Edmund L. Morris	Progressive Conservative
24th	1958–1962	Robert McCleave	Progressive Conservative	Edmund L. Morris	Progressive Conservative
25th	1962–1963	Robert McCleave	Progressive Conservative	Edmund L. Morris	Progressive Conservative
26th	1963–1965	John Lloyd	Liberal	Gerald Regan	Liberal
27th	1965–1968	Robert McCleave	Progressive Conservative	Michael Forrestall	Progressive Conservative

Single member riding (1968–present)
Parliament	Years	Member	Party
Halifax
28th	1968–1972	Robert Stanfield	Progressive Conservative
29th	1972–1974	Robert Stanfield	Progressive Conservative
30th	1974–1979	Robert Stanfield	Progressive Conservative
31st	1979–1980	George Cooper	Progressive Conservative
32nd	1980–1984	Gerald Regan	Liberal
33rd	1984–1988	Stewart McInnes	Progressive Conservative
34th	1988–1993	Mary Clancy	Liberal
35th	1993–1997	Mary Clancy	Liberal
36th	1997–2000	Alexa McDonough	New Democratic
37th	2000–2004	Alexa McDonough	New Democratic
38th	2004–2006	Alexa McDonough	New Democratic
39th	2006–2008	Alexa McDonough	New Democratic
40th	2008–2011	Megan Leslie	New Democratic
41st	2011–2015	Megan Leslie	New Democratic
42nd	2015–2019	Andy Fillmore	Liberal
43rd	2019–2021	Andy Fillmore	Liberal
44th	2021–2024	Andy Fillmore	Liberal
44th	2024–2025	Vacant	
45th	2025-present	Shannon Miedema	Liberal

== Election results ==
=== 2025 ===
2025 Canadian federal election
Party	Candidate	Votes	%	±%	Expenditures
Liberal	Shannon Miedema	32,886	63.05	+20.81	$116,613.42
Conservative	Mark Boudreau	9,939	19.05	+6.30	$92,686.92
New Democratic	Lisa Roberts	8,642	16.57	-23.72	$117,652.18
Green	Amethyste Hamel-Gregory	422	0.81	-1.40	$0.00
People's	Maricar Aliasut	271	0.52	-1.59	$347.00
Total valid votes/expense limit		52,160	99.31	-0.07	$123,770.95
Total rejected ballots		365	0.69	+0.07	
Turnout		52,525	73.49		
Eligible voters (Note: Number of eligible voters does not include election day registrations.)		71,469			
Liberal notional hold		Swing		+7.26	
Source: Elections Canada

=== 2021 ===
2021 federal election redistributed results
Party	Vote	%
Liberal	20,087	42.24
New Democratic	19,160	40.29
Conservative	6,062	12.75
Green	1,052	2.21
People's	1,003	2.11
Others	192	0.40

2021 Canadian federal election
Party	Candidate	Votes	%	±%	Expenditures
Liberal	Andy Fillmore	21,905	42.74	+0.27	$103,501.55
New Democratic	Lisa Roberts	20,347	39.70	+9.66	$90,503.01
Conservative	Cameron Ells	6,601	12.88	+1.30	$2,924.56
Green	Jo-Ann Roberts	1,128	2.20	–12.17	$12,448.57
People's	B. Alexander Hébert	1,069	2.09	+0.95	$3,500.64
Communist	Katie Campbell	198	0.39	–	$0.00
Total valid votes/expense limit		51,248	99.38		$108,761.04
Total rejected ballots		322	0.62	–0.02	
Turnout		51,570	66.06	–6.96	
Registered voters		78,065			
Liberal hold		Swing		–4.70	
Source: Elections Canada

=== 2019 ===
2019 Canadian federal election
Party	Candidate	Votes	%	±%	Expenditures
Liberal	Andy Fillmore	23,681	42.48	−9.25	$77,935.01
New Democratic	Christine Saulnier	16,747	30.04	−6.09	$92,096.82
Green	Jo-Ann Roberts	8,013	14.37	+11.08	$46,730.72
Conservative	Bruce Holland	6,456	11.58	+2.97	none listed
People's	Duncan McGenn	633	1.14	–	none listed
Animal Protection	Bill Wilson	222	0.40	–	$2,719.51
Total valid votes/expense limit		55,752	99.36		$102,876.75
Total rejected ballots		361	0.64	+0.16	
Turnout		56,113	73.02	+0.40	
Eligible voters		76,843			
Liberal hold		Swing		-1.58	
Source: Elections Canada

=== 2015 ===
2015 Canadian federal election
Party	Candidate	Votes	%	±%	Expenditures
Liberal	Andy Fillmore	27,431	51.73	+26.08	$134,528.53
New Democratic	Megan Leslie	19,162	36.13	–15.49	$169,615.12
Conservative	Irvine Carvery	4,564	8.61	–9.41	$22,288.40
Green	Thomas Trappenberg	1,745	3.29	–1.10	$692.58
Marxist–Leninist	Allan Bezanson	130	0.25	-0.09	–
Total valid votes/expense limit		53,032	99.51		$204,329.68
Total rejected ballots		259	0.49		
Turnout		53,291	72.62		
Eligible voters		73,379			
Liberal gain from New Democratic		Swing		+20.78	
Source: Elections Canada

2011 federal election redistributed results
Party	Vote	%
New Democratic	23,761	51.62
Liberal	11,805	25.64
Conservative	8,292	18.01
Green	2,023	4.39
Marxist-Leninist	152	0.33

=== 2011 ===
2011 Canadian federal election
Party	Candidate	Votes	%	±%	Expenditures
New Democratic	Megan Leslie	23,746	51.64	+8.95	$82,238.55
Liberal	Stan Kutcher	11,793	25.64	-1.98	$78,191.23
Conservative	George Nikolaou	8,276	18.00	-2.61	$48,637.42
Green	Michael Dewar	2,020	4.39	-4.32	$1,663.22
Marxist–Leninist	Tony Seed	152	0.33	-0.03	none listed
Total valid votes/expense limit		45,987	99.48		$84,606.68
Total rejected, unmarked and declined ballots		241	0.52	+0.01	
Turnout		46,228	63.02	+2.35	
Eligible voters		73,357			
New Democratic hold		Swing		+5.46	

=== 2008 ===
2008 Canadian federal election
Party	Candidate	Votes	%	±%	Expenditures
New Democratic	Megan Leslie	19,252	42.69	-4.19	$74,406.04
Liberal	Catherine Meade	12,458	27.62	-3.27	$44,352.90
Conservative	Ted Larsen	9,295	20.61	+2.61	$57,956.79
Green	Darryl Whetter	3,931	8.72	+4.82	$1,734.06
Marxist–Leninist	Tony Seed	162	0.36	+0.03	none listed
Total valid votes/expense limit		45,098	99.49		$81,457
Total rejected, unmarked and declined ballots		230	0.51	+0.09	
Turnout		45,328	60.67	-4.59	
Eligible voters		74,717			
New Democratic hold		Swing		-0.46	

=== 2006 ===
2006 Canadian federal election
Party	Candidate	Votes	%	±%	Expenditures
New Democratic	Alexa McDonough	23,420	46.88	+5.33	$67,353.61
Liberal	Martin MacKinnon	15,437	30.90	-8.22	$62,643.27
Conservative	Andrew House	8,993	18.00	+3.37	$73,744.64
Green	Nick Wright	1,948	3.90	-0.81	$861.16
Marxist–Leninist	Tony Seed	164	0.33	–	none listed
Total valid votes/expense limit		49,962	99.58		$77,542
Total rejected, unmarked and declined ballots		209	0.42	-0.17	
Turnout		50,171	65.25	+2.58	
Eligible voters		76,885			
New Democratic hold		Swing		+6.77	

=== 2004 ===
2004 Canadian federal election
Party	Candidate	Votes	%	±%	Expenditures
New Democratic	Alexa McDonough	18,341	41.55	-0.01	$64,636.07
Liberal	Sheila Fougere	17,267	39.11	+7.25	$61,349.27
Conservative	Kevin Keefe	6,457	14.63	-9.19	$61,519.35
Green	Michael Oddy	2,081	4.71		none listed
Total valid votes/expense limit		44,146	99.41		$73,393
Total rejected, unmarked and declined ballots		260	0.59		
Turnout		44,406	62.68		
Eligible voters		70,847			
New Democratic notional hold		Swing		-3.63	
Changes from 2000 are based on redistributed results. Conservative Party change is based on the combination of Canadian Alliance and Progressive Conservative Party totals.

2000 federal election redistributed results
Party	Vote	%
New Democratic	17,548	41.56
Liberal	13,453	31.86
Progressive Conservative	7,487	17.73
Alliance	2,570	6.09
Others	1,169	2.77

=== 2000 ===
2000 Canadian federal election
Party	Candidate	Votes	%	±%
New Democratic	Alexa McDonough	16,563	40.36	-8.66
Liberal	Kevin Little	13,539	32.99	+11.36
Progressive Conservative	Paul Fitzgibbons	7,255	17.68	-5.58
Alliance	Amery Boyer	2,348	5.72	+0.28
Marijuana	Mike Patriquen	627	1.53	
Green	Michael Oddy	590	1.44	
Marxist–Leninist	Kevin Dumont Corkill	113	0.28	+0.08
Total valid votes		41,035	99.57	
Total rejected, unmarked and declined ballots		176	0.43	-0.14
Turnout		41,211	60.74	-8.11
Eligible voters		67,849		
New Democratic hold		Swing		-10.01

Changes for the Canadian Alliance from 1997 are based on the results of its predecessor, the Reform Party.

=== 1997 ===
1997 Canadian federal election
Party	Candidate	Votes	%	±%
New Democratic	Alexa McDonough	21,837	49.02	+36.80
Progressive Conservative	Terry Donahoe	10,361	23.26	+1.63
Liberal	Mary Clancy	9,638	21.64	-25.78
Reform	Steve Greene	2,422	5.44	-8.31
Natural Law	Gilles Bigras	197	0.44	
Marxist–Leninist	Tony Seed	89	0.20	
Total valid votes		44,544	99.44	
Total rejected, unmarked and declined ballots		252	0.56	
Turnout		44,796	68.85	
Eligible voters		65,061		
New Democratic notional gain from Liberal		Swing		+31.29

=== 1993 ===
1993 federal election redistributed results
Party	Vote	%
Liberal	21,210	47.42
Progressive Conservative	9,677	21.63
Reform	6,151	13.75
New Democratic	5,469	12.23
Others	2,225	4.97

1993 Canadian federal election
Party	Candidate	Votes	%	±%
Liberal	Mary Clancy	21,326	45.91	+2.90
Progressive Conservative	Jim Vaughan	9,600	20.67	-17.31
Reform	Steve Greene	6,717	14.46	
New Democratic	Lynn Jones	6,214	13.38	-4.36
National	Charles Phillips	1,383	2.98	
Natural Law	Gilles Bigras	448	0.96	
Green	W. Vladimir Klonowski	307	0.66	
Independent	A.R. Art Canning	277	0.60	
Independent	Steve Rimek	99	0.21	
Marxist–Leninist	Tony Seed	84	0.18	-0.08
Total valid votes		46,455	99.06	
Total rejected, unmarked and declined ballots		439	0.94	
Turnout		46,894	58.94	
Eligible voters		79,568		
Liberal hold		Swing		+10.10

Changes for Marxist–Leninist candidate Tony Seed are based on his 1988 results, when he ran as an Independent.

=== 1988 ===
1988 Canadian federal election
Party	Candidate	Votes	%	±%
Liberal	Mary Clancy	22,470	43.00	+8.64
Progressive Conservative	Stewart McInnes	19,840	37.97	-6.80
New Democratic	Ray Larkin	9,269	17.74	-2.71
Libertarian	Howard J. MacKinnon	292	0.56	
Communist	Miguel Figueroa	151	0.29	
Independent	Tony Seed	134	0.26	
Commonwealth of Canada	J. Basil MacDougall	94	0.18	
Total valid votes		52,250	100.00	
Liberal gain from Progressive Conservative		Swing		+7.72

=== 1984 ===
1984 Canadian federal election
Party	Candidate	Votes	%	±%
Progressive Conservative	Stewart McInnes	18,779	44.78	+6.19
Liberal	Gerald Regan	14,411	34.36	-7.27
New Democratic	Tessa Hebb	8,576	20.45	+0.78
Independent	Ignatius Kennedy	174	0.41	
Total valid votes		41,940	99.33	
Total rejected, unmarked and declined ballots		285	0.67	+0.14
Turnout		42,225	76.38	+8.61
Eligible voters		55,286		
Progressive Conservative gain from Liberal		Swing		+6.73

=== 1980 ===
1980 Canadian federal election
Party	Candidate	Votes	%	±%
Liberal	Gerald Regan	16,949	41.63	+1.21
Progressive Conservative	George Cooper	15,710	38.58	-1.87
New Democratic	Alexa McDonough	8,009	19.67	+1.14
Marxist–Leninist	Charles Spurr	48	0.12	+0.05
Total valid votes		40,716	99.47	
Total rejected, unmarked and declined ballots		218	0.53	
Turnout		40,934	67.77	
Eligible voters		60,405		
Liberal gain from Progressive Conservative		Swing		+1.54

=== 1979 ===
1979 Canadian federal election
Party	Candidate	Votes	%	±%
Progressive Conservative	George Cooper	16,570	40.45	-8.80
Liberal	Brian Flemming	16,555	40.42	-0.28
New Democratic	Alexa McDonough	7,590	18.53	+9.20
Independent	David F. Gray	155	0.38	
Communist	D. Scott Milsom	64	0.16	
Marxist–Leninist	Tony Seed	27	0.07	-0.18
Total valid votes		40,961	100.00	
Progressive Conservative hold		Swing		-4.26

=== 1974 ===
1974 Canadian federal election
Party	Candidate	Votes	%	±%
Progressive Conservative	Robert Stanfield	14,865	49.26	-6.78
Liberal	Brian Flemming	12,282	40.70	+9.39
New Democratic	Alasdair M. Sinclair	2,817	9.33	-2.94
Social Credit	Brian Pitcairn	140	0.46	
Marxist–Leninist	Tony Seed	75	0.25	-0.13
Total valid votes		30,179	100.00	
Progressive Conservative hold		Swing		-8.08

Changes for Marxist–Leninist candidate Tony Seed are based on his results in 1972, when he ran unaffiliated.

=== 1972 ===
1972 Canadian federal election
Party	Candidate	Votes	%	±%
Progressive Conservative	Robert Stanfield	17,966	56.04	-4.29
Liberal	Terry McGrath	10,039	31.31	-4.31
New Democratic	Marty Dolin	3,936	12.28	+8.23
Independent	Tony Seed	121	0.38	
Total valid votes		32,062	100.00	
Turnout			74.43	
Eligible voters		43,078		
Progressive Conservative hold		Swing		+0.01

=== 1968 ===
1968 Canadian federal election
Party	Candidate	Votes	%	±%
Progressive Conservative	Robert Stanfield	19,569	60.33	+12.91
Liberal	M. Gregory Tompkins	11,555	35.62	-6.97
New Democratic	Gus Wedderburn	1,314	4.05	-5.42
Total valid votes		32,438	100.00	
Progressive Conservative notional hold		Swing		+9.94

^ Change compared to combined party vote totals from 1965

=== 1867–1968: two members ===
1965 Canadian federal election
Party	Candidate	Votes	%	±%	Elected
Progressive Conservative	Robert McCleave	46,007	25.08	+1.83	✓
Progressive Conservative	Michael Forrestall	40,983	22.34		✓
Liberal	John Lloyd	39,942	21.77	-3.52	
Liberal	Robert J. Butler	38,191	20.82		
New Democratic	Jim Aitchison	8,983	4.90		
New Democratic	Bruce Wallace	8,387	4.57		
Independent	Ignatius Jeriome Kennedy	950	0.52		
Total valid votes		183,443	100.00		
Progressive Conservative notional gain from Liberal		Swing		+4.39	

1963 Canadian federal election
Party	Candidate	Votes	%	±%	Elected
Liberal	John Lloyd	46,274	25.29	+2.35	✓
Liberal	Gerald Regan	45,173	24.69	+2.21	✓
Progressive Conservative	Robert McCleave	42,548	23.25	-0.51	
Progressive Conservative	Finlay Macdonald	41,655	22.77		
New Democratic	Allan O'Brien	3,860	2.11		
New Democratic	Perry Ronayne	3,466	1.89	-1.23	
Total valid votes		182,976	100.00		
Liberal notional gain from Progressive Conservative		Swing		+2.72	

1962 Canadian federal election
Party	Candidate	Votes	%	±%	Elected
Progressive Conservative	Robert McCleave	42,964	23.77	-6.28	✓
Progressive Conservative	Edmund L. Morris	41,804	23.12	-6.68	✓
Liberal	John Lloyd	41,472	22.94		
Liberal	Gerald A. Regan	40,635	22.48		
New Democratic	James H. Aitchison	6,464	3.58		
New Democratic	Perry Ronayne	5,653	3.13		
Social Credit	Robert J. Kuglin	1,784	0.99		
Total valid votes		180,776	100.00		
Progressive Conservative notional hold		Swing		-10.40	

1958 Canadian federal election
Party	Candidate	Votes	%	±%	Elected
Progressive Conservative	Robert McCleave	53,693	30.05	+4.73	✓
Progressive Conservative	Edmund L. Morris	53,255	29.80	+4.51	✓
Liberal	John Horace Dickey	34,227	19.15	-4.35	
Liberal	Leonard Kitz	32,916	18.42		
Co-operative Commonwealth	Hyacinth Lawrence MacIntosh	2,552	1.43	+0.21	
Co-operative Commonwealth	Lloyd Carman Wilson	2,048	1.15	+0.18	
Total valid votes		178,691	100.00		
Progressive Conservative notional hold		Swing		+9.43	

1957 Canadian federal election
Party	Candidate	Votes	%	±%	Elected
Progressive Conservative	Robert McCleave	41,140	25.32		✓
Progressive Conservative	Edmund L. Morris	41,099	25.29	+3.94	✓
Liberal	Samuel Rosborough Balcom	38,504	23.70	-3.83	
Liberal	John Horace Dickey	38,191	23.51	-4.32	
Co-operative Commonwealth	Hyacinth Lawrence MacIntosh	1,984	1.22	-0.98	
Co-operative Commonwealth	Lloyd Carman Wilson	1,562	0.96	-0.74	
Total valid votes		162,480	99.64		
Total rejected, unmarked and declined ballots		590	0.36	+0.00	
Turnout			≥75.21	+11.68	
Eligible voters		108,414			
Progressive Conservative notional gain from Liberal		Swing		+9.00	

1953 Canadian federal election
Party	Candidate	Votes	%	±%	Elected
Liberal	John Horace Dickey	34,587	27.82	+0.05	✓
Liberal	Samuel Rosborough Balcom	34,222	27.53	*	✓
Progressive Conservative	Edmund L. Morris	26,552	21.36		
Progressive Conservative	Frederick William Bissett	24,112	19.39	+3.39	
Co-operative Commonwealth	Hyacinth Lawrence MacIntosh	2,731	2.20	-3.09	
Co-operative Commonwealth	Lloyd Carman Wilson	2,120	1.71		
Total valid votes		124,324	99.64		
Total rejected, unmarked and declined ballots		449	0.36	+0.07	
Turnout			≥63.52	+0.64	
Eligible voters		98,208			
Liberal notional hold		Swing		-5.39	

^ Individual swings calculated from 1949 election. Party swing calculated from 1950 by-election.

Canadian federal by-election, 19 June 1950 Called upon Gordon Benjamin Isnor being called to the Senate, 2 May 1950
Party	Candidate	Votes	%	±%	Elected
Liberal	Samuel Rosborough Balcom	24,665	57.07	-0.04	✓
Progressive Conservative	Lloyd Allen	13,696	31.69	-0.85	
Co-operative Commonwealth	J.W.A. Nicholson	4,861	11.25	+0.89	
Total valid votes		43,222	100.00		
Liberal hold		Swing		+0.40	

1949 Canadian federal election
Party	Candidate	Votes	%	±%	Elected
Liberal	Gordon Benjamin Isnor	33,401	29.33		✓
Liberal	John Horace Dickey	31,627	27.77	+5.28	✓
Progressive Conservative	Joseph Patrick Connolly	18,826	16.53		
Progressive Conservative	Frederick William Bissett	18,223	16.00		
Co-operative Commonwealth	Hyacinth Lawrence MacIntosh	6,018	5.28		
Co-operative Commonwealth	Lloyd R. Shaw	5,777	5.07	-3.44	
Total valid votes		113,872	99.71		
Total rejected, unmarked and declined ballots		329	0.29		
Turnout			≥62.88	+1.30	
Eligible voters		90,803			
Liberal notional hold		Swing		+2.45	

^ Individual swings calculated from 1945 election. Party swing calculated from 1947 by-election.

Canadian federal by-election, 14 July 1947 On William Chisholm MacDonald's death, November 19, 1946
Party	Candidate	Votes	%	±%	Elected
Liberal	John Horace Dickey	24,469	44.99	-2.65	✓
Co-operative Commonwealth	Hyacinth Lawrence MacIntosh	16,151	29.70	+12.82	
Progressive Conservative	Alex A. McDonald	13,768	25.31	-9.18	
Total valid votes		54,388	100.00		
Liberal hold		Swing		-7.73	

1945 Canadian federal election
Party	Candidate	Votes	%	±%	Elected
Liberal	Gordon Benjamin Isnor	26,407	25.15	+3.25	✓
Liberal	William Chisholm MacDonald	23,616	22.49	-2.45	✓
Progressive Conservative	Henry P. MacKeen	18,182	17.31		
Progressive Conservative	Gerald Dwyer	18,037	17.18		
Co-operative Commonwealth	Lloyd R. Shaw	8,937	8.51		
Co-operative Commonwealth	R. Leo Rooney	8,783	8.36		
Labor–Progressive	R. Charles Murray	560	0.53		
Independent	O.R. Regan	488	0.46		
Total valid votes		105,010	100.00		
Turnout			≥61.58	-3.15	
Eligible voters		85,262			
Liberal notional hold		Swing		+3.65	

1940 Canadian federal election
Party	Candidate	Votes	%	±%	Elected
Liberal	William Chisholm MacDonald	22,089	24.94		✓
Liberal	Gordon Benjamin Isnor	19,398	21.90	-6.28	✓
National Government	Richard A. Donahoe	18,197	20.54		
National Government	Charles B. Smith	18,114	20.45		
Independent Liberal	Robert Emmett Finn	9,217	10.41	-16.78	
Co-operative Commonwealth	Helgi I.S. Borgford	1,561	1.76		
Total valid votes		88,576	100.00		
Turnout			≥64.73	-6.13	
Eligible voters		68,422			
Liberal notional hold		Swing		-9.09	

1935 Canadian federal election
Party	Candidate	Votes	%	±%	Elected
Liberal	Gordon Benjamin Isnor	24,158	28.18		✓
Liberal	Robert Emmett Finn	23,312	27.19		✓
Conservative	Robert D. Guilford	13,624	15.89		
Conservative	Louis A. Gastonguay	13,250	15.45		
Reconstruction	John Furlong	6,307	7.36		
Reconstruction	John Joseph Power	5,091	5.94		
Total valid votes		85,742	100.00		
Turnout			≥70.86	-5.82	
Eligible voters		60,503			
Liberal notional gain from Conservative		Swing		+14.63	

1930 Canadian federal election
Party	Candidate	Votes	%	±%	Elected
Conservative	William Anderson Black	21,611	26.51	-1.82	✓
Conservative	Felix Patrick Quinn	21,280	26.11	-1.05	✓
Liberal	Peter R. Jack	19,439	23.85		
Liberal	Edward Joseph Cragg	19,185	23.54		
Total valid votes		81,515	100.00		
Turnout			≥76.68		
Eligible voters		53,154			
Conservative notional hold		Swing		-2.87	
Source: Sayers, Anthony (2017). "1930 Federal Election". Canadian Elections Database.

1926 Canadian federal election
Party	Candidate	Votes	%	±%	Elected
Conservative	William Anderson Black	17,911	28.33	-3.96	✓
Conservative	Felix Patrick Quinn	17,171	27.16	-3.76	✓
Liberal	James Layton Ralston	14,139	22.36		
Liberal	John Murphy	14,007	22.15		
Total valid votes		63,228	100.00		
Conservative notional hold		Swing		-7.71	

1925 Canadian federal election
Party	Candidate	Votes	%	±%	Elected
Conservative	William Anderson Black	18,796	32.29		✓
Conservative	Felix Patrick Quinn	17,996	30.91		✓
Liberal	Gordon Ross Marshall	10,815	18.58		
Liberal	Robert Emmett Finn	10,609	18.22		
Total valid votes		58,216	100.00		
Conservative notional hold		Swing		+9.30	

Canadian federal by-election, 5 December 1923 Called upon Alexander Kenneth Maclean's acceptance of an office of emolument under the Crown, 2 November 1923
Party	Candidate	Votes	%	±%	Elected
Conservative	William Anderson Black	13,365	53.90	+23.68	✓
Liberal	George Alfred Redmond	11,433	46.10	-8.50	
Total valid votes		24,798	100.00		
Conservative notional gain from Liberal		Swing		+16.09	

Canadian federal by-election, 4 December 1922 Called upon Edward Blackadder's death, 22 October 1922
Party	Candidate	Votes	%	±%	Elected
Liberal	Robert Emmett Finn	8,668	54.61	+1.64	✓
Conservative	John Joseph Power	4,796	30.21	-3.75	
Labour	James Joseph O'Connell	2,409	15.18	+2.11	
Total valid votes		15,873	100.00		
Liberal hold		Swing		+2.70	

1921 Canadian federal election
Party	Candidate	Votes	%	Elected
Liberal	Edward Blackadder	16,157	26.70	✓
Liberal	Alexander Kenneth Maclean	15,892	26.27	✓
Conservative	Hector McInnes	11,016	18.21	
Conservative	James Wilfred Doyle	9,537	15.76	
Labour	Arthur Charles Hawkins	4,141	6.84	
Labour	Joseph Sylvester Wallace	3,763	6.22	
Total valid votes		60,506	100.00	
Source(s) "Halifax (1867- )". History of Federal Ridings Since 1867. Library of Parliament. Two members were elected from the district.

1917 Canadian federal election
Party	Candidate	Votes	Elected
Government (Unionist)	Alexander Kenneth Maclean	acclaimed	✓
Government (Unionist)	Peter Francis Martin	acclaimed	✓

Canadian federal by-election, October 27, 1911 Called upon the appointment of Robert Borden's as President of the King's Privy Council for Canada and his becoming Prime Minister of Canada, 10 October 1911.
Party	Candidate	Votes	Elected
Conservative	Robert Borden	acclaimed	✓
Total valid votes		–	–
Source(s) "Halifax (1867- )". History of Federal Ridings Since 1867. Library of Parliament.

1911 Canadian federal election
Party	Candidate	Votes	%	±%	Elected
Conservative	Robert Borden	7,040	25.46	-1.34	✓
Liberal	Alexander Kenneth Maclean	6,946	25.12		✓
Liberal	Edward Blackadder	6,879	24.88		
Conservative	Adam Brown Crosby	6,787	24.54	-1.27	
Total valid votes		27,652	100.00		
Conservative hold		Swing		-2.61	
Liberal gain from Conservative		Swing		–	
Source(s) "Halifax (1867- )". History of Federal Ridings Since 1867. Library of Parliament. Two members were elected from the district.

1908 Canadian federal election
Party	Candidate	Votes	%	±%	Elected
Conservative	Robert Borden	7,386	26.80	+2.42	✓
Conservative	Adam Brown Crosby	7,115	25.82		✓
Liberal	William Roche	6,635	24.08	-1.91	
Liberal	Michael Carney	6,423	23.31	-3.22	
Total valid votes		27,559	98.47		
Total rejected, unmarked and declined ballots		428	1.53	+1.03	
Turnout			≥71.14	-2.80	
Eligible voters		19,670			
Conservative notional gain from Liberal		Swing		+5.13	
Source(s) Source: Sayers, Anthony (2017). "1908 Federal Election". Canadian Elections Database. Two members were elected from the district.

1904 Canadian federal election
Party	Candidate	Votes	%	±%	Elected
Liberal	William Roche	7,430	26.53	+1.43	✓
Liberal	Michael Carney	7,277	25.98		✓
Conservative	Robert Borden	6,830	24.39	-1.29	
Conservative	John C. O'Mullin	6,472	23.11		
Total valid votes		28,009	99.50		
Total rejected, unmarked and declined ballots		141	0.50		
Turnout			≥73.04		
Eligible voters		19,035			
Liberal hold		Swing		+3.21	
Liberal gain from Conservative		Swing		–	
Source(s) Source: Sayers, Anthony (2017). "1904 Federal Election". Canadian Elections Database. Two members were elected from the district.

1900 Canadian federal election
Party	Candidate	Votes	%	±%	Elected
Conservative	Robert Borden	5,705	25.67	-0.86	✓
Liberal	William Roche	5,577	25.09		✓
Conservative	Thomas Edward Kenny	5,562	25.03	+0.88	
Liberal	William B. Wallace	5,380	24.21		
Total valid votes		22,224	100.00		
Conservative hold		Swing		+0.02	
Liberal hold		Swing		-0.02	
Source(s) "Halifax (1867- )". History of Federal Ridings Since 1867. Library of Parliament. Two members were elected from the district.

1896 Canadian federal election
Party	Candidate	Votes	%	Elected
Conservative	Robert Borden	6,170	26.53	✓
Liberal	Benjamin Russell	5,997	25.79	✓
Conservative	Thomas Edward Kenny	5,616	24.15	
Liberal	Michael Edwin Keefe	5,472	23.53	
Total valid votes		23,255	100.00	
Source(s) "Halifax (1867- )". History of Federal Ridings Since 1867. Library of Parliament. Two members were elected from the district.

Approximately 13,000 valid ballots were cast in this election.

Canadian federal by-election, 11 February 1892
Party	Candidate	Votes	Elected
Conservative	Thomas Edward Kenny	acclaimed	✓
Conservative	John Fitzwilliam Stairs	acclaimed	✓
Called upon election being declared void

1891 Canadian federal election
Party	Candidate	Votes	%	Elected
Conservative	Thomas Edward Kenny	5,274	27.69	✓
Conservative	John Fitzwilliam Stairs	5,262	27.63	✓
Liberal	Alfred Gilpin Jones	4,335	22.76	
Liberal	Edward Farrell	4,174	21.92	
Total valid votes		19,045	100.00	

Approximately 10,000 valid ballots cast in this election.

1887 Canadian federal election
Party	Candidate	Votes	%	Elected
Liberal	Alfred Gilpin Jones	4,243	25.53	✓
Conservative	Thomas Edward Kenny	4,181	25.15	✓
Conservative	John Fitzwilliam Stairs	4,099	24.66	
Liberal	H.H. Fuller	4,098	24.66	
Total valid votes		16,621	100.00	

Approximately 8500 valid ballots cast in this election.

Canadian federal by-election, 25 July 1883
Party	Candidate	Votes	Elected
Conservative	John Fitzwilliam Stairs	acclaimed	✓
Called upon Matthew Richey being named Lieutenant Governor of Nova Scotia, 4 July 1883

1882 Canadian federal election
Party	Candidate	Votes	%	Elected
Liberal–Conservative	M.B. Daly	2,811	25.84	✓
Liberal–Conservative	Matthew Henry Richey	2,785	25.60	✓
Independent	Alfred Gilpin Jones	2,720	25.00	
Liberal	H.H. Fuller	2,563	23.56	
Total valid votes		10,879	100.00	

Approximately 5500 valid ballots cast in this election.

1878 Canadian federal election
Party	Candidate	Votes	%	Elected
Liberal–Conservative	Matthew Henry Richey	3,532	28.13	✓
Liberal–Conservative	Malachy Bowes Daly	3,466	27.60	✓
Independent	Alfred Gilpin Jones	2,863	22.80	
Independent Liberal	Patrick Power	2,695	21.46	
Total valid votes		12,556	100.00	
Source: Canadian Elections Database

Approximately 6300 ballots cast in this election.

Canadian federal by-election, 29 January 1878
Party	Candidate	Votes	%	Elected
Independent	Alfred Gilpin Jones	2,981	51.92	✓
Unknown	Matthew Henry Richey	2,761	48.08	
Total valid votes		5,742	100.00	
Called upon the resignation of Alfred Jones because of an alleged breach of the Independence of Parliament Act

1874 Canadian federal election
Party	Candidate	Votes	%	Elected
Independent Liberal	Patrick Power	3,186	45.52	✓
Independent	Alfred Gilpin Jones	2,979	42.56	✓
Unknown	G. Robb	834	11.92	
Total valid votes		6,999	100.00	
Source: lop.parl.ca

1872 Canadian federal election
Party	Candidate	Votes	%	Elected
Liberal–Conservative	William Johnston Almon	2,528	25.55	✓
Liberal	Stephen Tobin	2,486	25.12	✓
Independent Liberal	Patrick Power	2,452	24.78	
Independent	Alfred Gilpin Jones	2,430	24.56	
Total valid votes		9,896	100.00	
Source: Canadian Elections Database

4948 valid ballots cast.

1867 Canadian federal election
Party	Candidate	Votes	%	Elected
Anti-Confederation	Alfred Jones	2,381	26.28	✓
Anti-Confederation	Patrick Power	2,367	26.13	✓
Unknown	John Tobin	2,158	23.82	
Unknown	S. Shannon	2,154	23.77	
Total valid votes		9,060	100.00	
Source: Canadian Elections Database

4480 voted out of 5958 eligible voters.

== See also ==
- List of Canadian electoral districts
- Historical federal electoral districts of Canada

Parliament of Canada
Preceded by Quebec East	Constituency represented by the prime minister 1911–1917	Succeeded by Kings
