= William Anderson Black =

Canadian politician

The Honourable William Anderson Black PC

Member of the Canadian Parliament for Halifax
- In office December 5, 1923 – September 1, 1934

Personal details
- Born: October 9, 1847 Windsor, Nova Scotia
- Died: September 1, 1934 (aged 86)
- Party: Conservative

William Anderson Black, PC (October 9, 1847 – September 1, 1934) was a Canadian politician. He is the oldest person ever elected to the House of Commons of Canada, 76 years, 1 month, 26 days when he was first elected. He was 83 when he last won election and he died in office.

He was born in Windsor, Nova Scotia, the son of Samuel Gay Black and Sophia Wright. In 1875, with Robert Pickford, Black founded Pickford and Black, a company that supplied ship's provisions. The company expanded into shipping passengers and freight as well as trading in the West Indies. He represented Halifax County in the Nova Scotia House of Assembly from 1894 to 1897. In 1922, he was a co-founder of the Maritime Life Assurance Company. Black was first elected to the House of Commons of Canada for the riding of Halifax in a 1923 by-election. A Conservative, he was re-elected in 1925, 1926, and 1930. In 1926, he was the Minister of Marine and Fisheries (Acting) and Minister of Railways and Canals in the short lived cabinet of Arthur Meighen.

Black also served as president of Eastern Canada Savings and Loan and was a director for the Royal Bank. He married Annie Bell and had five children. In 1924, he established a chair of commerce at Dalhousie University.

== Electoral record ==
1930 Canadian federal election: Halifax
Party	Candidate	Votes	%	±%	Elected
Conservative	William Anderson Black	21,611	26.51	-1.82	✓
Conservative	Felix Patrick Quinn	21,280	26.11	-1.05	✓
Liberal	Peter R. Jack	19,439	23.85		
Liberal	Edward Joseph Cragg	19,185	23.54		
Total valid votes		81,515	100.00		
Turnout			≥76.68		
Eligible voters		53,154			
Conservative notional hold		Swing		-2.87	
Source: Sayers, Anthony (2017). "1930 Federal Election". Canadian Elections Database.

1926 Canadian federal election: Halifax
Party	Candidate	Votes	%	±%	Elected
Conservative	William Anderson Black	17,911	28.33	-3.96	✓
Conservative	Felix Patrick Quinn	17,171	27.16	-3.76	✓
Liberal	James Layton Ralston	14,139	22.36		
Liberal	John Murphy	14,007	22.15		
Total valid votes		63,228	100.00		
Conservative notional hold		Swing		-7.71	

1925 Canadian federal election: Halifax
Party	Candidate	Votes	%	±%	Elected
Conservative	William Anderson Black	18,796	32.29		✓
Conservative	Felix Patrick Quinn	17,996	30.91		✓
Liberal	Gordon Ross Marshall	10,815	18.58		
Liberal	Robert Emmett Finn	10,609	18.22		
Total valid votes		58,216	100.00		
Conservative notional hold		Swing		+9.30	
