= Shannon Miedema =

Canadian politician

Shannon Miedema MP
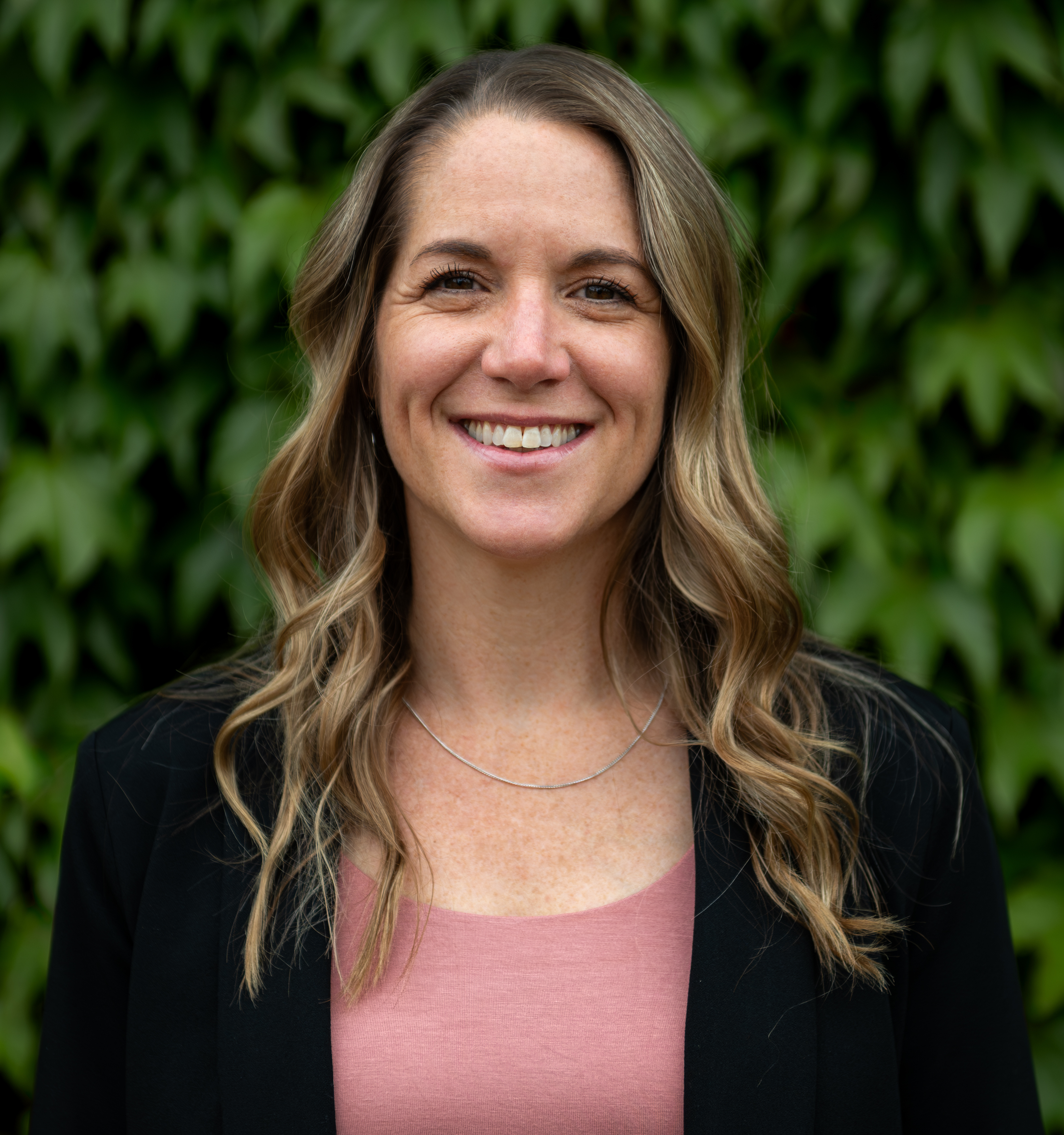

Member of Parliament for Halifax
- Incumbent
- Assumed office April 28, 2025
- Preceded by: Andy Fillmore

Personal details
- Born: 1979 or 1980 Ottawa, Ontario, Canada
- Education: University of King's College; Dalhousie University

Shannon Miedema MP (born 1979 or 1980) is a Canadian political figure and public servant. She was elected Member of Parliament for Halifax in the 2025 Canadian federal election. She was previously the Liberal nominee for the cancelled 2025 by-election for the same riding.

== Early life and education ==
Miedema was born in Ottawa and moved to Halifax to attend University of King's College for her Bachelor in Journalism, and later, Dalhousie University for her Masters in Environmental Studies. Miedema also holds a Bachelor of Environmental Studies and Earth System Science from Queens University. Miedema was President of the Young Naturalists Club of Canada and was awarded a Clean16 Award in 2023.

== Before politics ==
Miedema worked at the Halifax Regional Municipality for around 15 years, where as director of environment and climate change, she oversaw the design and implementation of HalifACT, the city's climate action plan. Prior to this, Miedema worked in consulting as a Sustainability and Socioeconomic Services Consultant for the Raidho Resource Consulting Limited and a Socioeconomic Analyst for Stantec.

Miedema also guest lectures and consults with Dalhousie’s Centre for Water Resources Studies, and worked with ShiftKey Labs.

== Political career ==
The nomination vote for the Liberal Party of Canada by-election in Halifax took place on March 1, 2025, at the Atlantica Hotel in Halifax. The candidates for the nomination were former Halifax-Chebucto MLA Joachim Stroink, Lawyer Ian Parker, and business owner Paul Fone. The election took place by ranked ballot.

The by-election for the riding of Halifax was called on March 2, 2025, by Prime Minister Justin Trudeau, to be held on April 14, 2025. The seat was left vacant following the departure of former Liberal MP Andy Fillmore, who resigned to run for Mayor of HRM. The other candidates for the by-election include the New Democratic Party's Lisa Roberts and the Conservative Party’s Mark Boudreau.

As the general election was called early, the by-election was cancelled.

At the time of the 2025 Canadian federal election, she lived in Dartmouth, Nova Scotia.

== Electoral record ==
2025 Canadian federal election: Halifax
Party	Candidate	Votes	%	±%	Expenditures
Liberal	Shannon Miedema	32,886	63.05	+20.81	$116,613.42
Conservative	Mark Boudreau	9,939	19.05	+6.30	$92,686.92
New Democratic	Lisa Roberts	8,642	16.57	-23.72	$117,652.18
Green	Amethyste Hamel-Gregory	422	0.81	-1.40	$0.00
People's	Maricar Aliasut	271	0.52	-1.59	$347.00
Total valid votes/expense limit		52,160	99.31	-0.07	$123,770.95
Total rejected ballots		365	0.69	+0.07	
Turnout		52,525	73.49		
Eligible voters (Note: Number of eligible voters does not include election day registrations.)		71,469			
Liberal notional hold		Swing		+7.26	
Source: Elections Canada
