= Robert Emmett Finn =

Canadian politician

Robert Emmett Finn (June 10, 1877 – February 23, 1951) was a lawyer and political figure in Nova Scotia, Canada. He represented Halifax County in the Nova Scotia House of Assembly from 1906 to 1922 and Halifax in the House of Commons of Canada from 1922 to 1925 and from 1936 to 1940 as a Liberal member.

He was born in Dartmouth, Nova Scotia, the son of John Finn and Mary Farrell, of Irish descent. Finn moved to Halifax while still young. He was educated at Dalhousie University, was called to the bar and set up practice in Halifax. In 1902, Finn married Anna Louise Russell. He served as president of the Charitable Irish Society. Finn was a war correspondent with the Canadian contingent during the Second Boer War in South Africa. He served as a minister without portfolio in the province's Executive Council from 1918 to 1922. He resigned his seat in the provincial assembly to run for a federal seat in 1922. Finn was defeated when he ran for reelection to the House of Commons in 1925 and 1940.

== Electoral record ==
1940 Canadian federal election: Halifax
Party	Candidate	Votes	%	±%	Elected
Liberal	William Chisholm MacDonald	22,089	24.94		✓
Liberal	Gordon Benjamin Isnor	19,398	21.90	-6.28	✓
National Government	Richard A. Donahoe	18,197	20.54		
National Government	Charles B. Smith	18,114	20.45		
Independent Liberal	Robert Emmett Finn	9,217	10.41	-16.78	
Co-operative Commonwealth	Helgi I.S. Borgford	1,561	1.76		
Total valid votes		88,576	100.00		
Turnout			≥64.73	-6.13	
Eligible voters		68,422			
Liberal notional hold		Swing		-9.09	

1935 Canadian federal election: Halifax
Party	Candidate	Votes	%	±%	Elected
Liberal	Gordon Benjamin Isnor	24,158	28.18		✓
Liberal	Robert Emmett Finn	23,312	27.19		✓
Conservative	Robert D. Guilford	13,624	15.89		
Conservative	Louis A. Gastonguay	13,250	15.45		
Reconstruction	John Furlong	6,307	7.36		
Reconstruction	John Joseph Power	5,091	5.94		
Total valid votes		85,742	100.00		
Turnout			≥70.86	-5.82	
Eligible voters		60,503			
Liberal notional gain from Conservative		Swing		+14.63	

Canadian federal by-election, 5 December 1923
Party	Candidate	Votes	%	Elected
Conservative	William Anderson Black	13,365	53.90	✓
Liberal	George Alfred Redmond	11,433	46.10	
Total valid votes		24,798	100.00	
Called upon Alexander Maclean's acceptance of an office of emolument under the Crown, 2 November 1923
