= Hector McInnes =

Canadian politician from Nova Scotia (1860–1937)

Hector McInnes QC

Member of the Nova Scotia House of Assembly for Halifax County
- In office June 20, 1916 – July 26, 1920

Personal details
- Born: September 10, 1860 Brule, Nova Scotia
- Died: June 19, 1937 (aged 76) Halifax, Nova Scotia
- Party: Liberal Conservative
- Spouse: Charlotte MacNeil
- Education: Dalhousie University (LLB)
- Occupation: barrister, politician

Hector McInnes QC (September 10, 1860 – June 19, 1937) was a barrister and political figure in Nova Scotia, Canada. He represented Halifax County in the Nova Scotia House of Assembly from 1916 to 1920 as a Liberal Conservative member.

McInnes was born in 1860 at Brule, Nova Scotia to Lauchlin McInnes and Ann Fraser. He was educated at Pictou Academy and Dalhousie University, receiving an Bachelor of Laws in 1888, and was later appointed King's Counsel. He married Charlotte MacNeil on September 7, 1892. He served as president of the Eastern Trust Company and as a director of the Bank of Nova Scotia, the Dominion Steel Corporation, and the Nova Scotia Savings and Loan. McInnes died in 1937 at Halifax, Nova Scotia.

McInnes was elected in the 1916 Nova Scotia general election and did not contest the 1920 Nova Scotia general election. He was an unsuccessful Conservative candidate in the 1921 Canadian federal election for Halifax.
