= Frederick William Bissett =

Canadian judge (1902–1978)

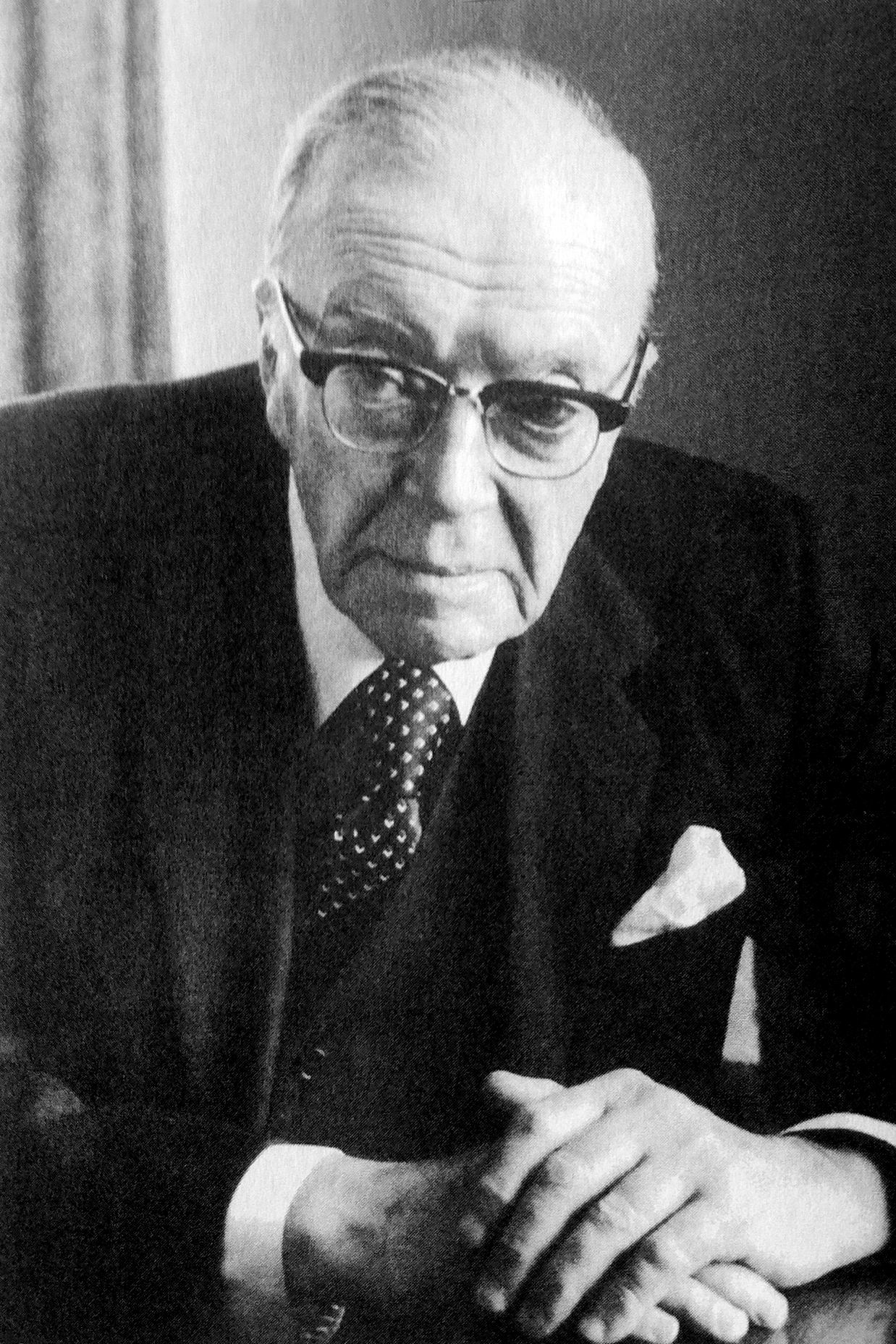
- Born: 1902
- Died: 1978 (aged 75–76)
- Education: Dalhousie University (1926)
- Occupations: Lawyer, judge
- Years active: 1926–1977

Frederick William Bissett (1902 – November, 1978) was a lawyer and later a Justice of the Supreme Court of Nova Scotia, Canada. He is mostly known as Viola Desmond's lawyer.

== Personal life ==
Bissett's parents moved from St. John's, Newfoundland Colony to Halifax, Nova Scotia when he was 3 months old. He graduated from Dalhousie University in 1926. He was Desmond's lawyer. He later became a Justice of Supreme Court of Nova Scotia in 1961. He retired in 1977 and died the following year.

== Legal defense of Viola Desmond ==
Bissett's decision to opt for a judicial review rather than appeal the original conviction proved disastrous. Furthermore, Bissett chose to focus the case on the issue of tax evasion and not on the basis of racial discrimination.

When dismissing the case, Justice William Lorimer Hall said:

Had the matter reached the court by some other method than certiorari there might have been an opportunity to right the wrong done this unfortunate woman. One wonders if the manager of the theatre who laid the complaint was so zealous because of a bona fide belief that there had been an attempt to defraud the province of Nova Scotia of the sum of one cent, or was it a surreptitious endeavour to enforce a Jim Crow rule by misuse of a public state.

— Justice William Lorimer Hall, when dismissing Desmond's application (1947)

Upon losing the case, Bissett refused to bill Desmond and his fees were donated back to William Pearly Oliver's Nova Scotia Association for the Advancement of Coloured People.

== Bibliography ==
- Backhouse, Constance (1999). Colour-coded: A Legal History of Racism in Canada, 1900-1950. University of Toronto Press. ISBN 978-0-8020-8286-2.
