= Canadian Club of Halifax =

Canadian speakers forum

- Formation: 7 February 1907; 119 years ago
- Type: Speaker's forum
- Headquarters: Halifax, Nova Scotia

Canadian Club of Halifax was a Canadian speaker's forum in Halifax, Nova Scotia, that was established in 1907.

== History ==
On 7 February 1907, the Canadian Club of Halifax was established at a meeting held in the council chamber of the Halifax City Hall. The club's constitution and by-laws were instituted on 22 February 1907, alongside the election of its officers. The Canadian Club of Halifax was led by a distinguished executive committee. Joseph Andrew Chisholm served as the committee's president, supported by Senior Vice President Charles Frederick Fraser and Junior Vice President Judge William Bernard Wallace. The club's financial and administrative duties were managed by Treasurer C. H. MacKinlay, Secretary C. A. Evans, and Archivist A. S. Barnstead. The committee members included notable figures such as George S. Campbell, Dugald MacGillivary, Hon. Justice Benjamin Russell, Howard Murray, Horace A. Flemming, and A. T. Weldon, reflecting the organization's prominence in Halifax society. Upon its formation, Duncan Cameron Fraser, the Lieutenant Governor of Nova Scotia, was appointed an honorary president, while Robert Alexander Falconer was designated an honorary member.

It formed within the network of Canadian Clubs across the country, like the Canadian Club of Toronto, designed to promote patriotism by encouraging interest in Canadian public affairs. The club worked to advance informed public discourse on subjects of general interest as opportunities arose. The first address was given to the club by John Stephen Willison on 21 March 1907, the 40th anniversary of Canadian Confederation, at the assembly hall of the Halifax School for the Blind. In its first year, the chief speakers included Lord Albert Grey, Justice Benjamin Russell, Rev. J. A. Macdonald, Prof. Stephen Leacock, Rev. Dr. Robert Magill, President R.A. Falconer, and Hon. George Perry Graham.

The Canadian Club of Halifax not only hosted lectures and discussions centered on Canadian issues but also championed citizenship projects, archaeological and historical studies, tours, and collaboration with the Association of Canadian Clubs.

The newly formed club took on the project of raising a memorial tower in Halifax to mark the 150th anniversary of the Provincial Assembly's opening in the city. The land along the Northwest Arm was generously provided by Sir Sandford Fleming, a key supporter of the project. Members of the Canadian Club took on the task of raising funds for the granite tower, starting with an initial donation from the Quebec Government. Additional support came from other Canadian Clubs, as well as governments, municipalities, corporations, and individuals across the British Empire. Lieutenant Governor D.C. Fraser laid the cornerstone of the tower in Sir Sandford Fleming Park on 2 October 1908.

On 18 December 1914, Prime Minister Rt. Hon. Sir Robert Borden delivered a speech before the Halifax Canadian Club members.

The Women's Canadian Club of Halifax, founded on 19 February 1939, became part of the Canadian Club of Halifax in 1969 with the unification of the two local clubs.

== Notable members ==
- Sir Robert Falconer
- Henry Bauld
- William Anderson Black
- William Chisholm
- Charles Cahan
- William Dennis
- Arthur Drysdale
- Charles William Drury
- James Wilberforce Longley
- James Crosskill Mackintosh
- David MacKeen
- Sir Sandford Fleming

== See also ==
- History of Nova Scotia
