= List of mayors of Halifax, Nova Scotia =

This is a list of mayors of the city Halifax, Nova Scotia. The City of Halifax is a former municipality in Nova Scotia which was amalgamated with the City of Dartmouth Town of Bedford and Halifax County to form the Halifax Regional Municipality in 1996.

This is a list of mayors for the City of Halifax from 1841 until amalgamation. Prior to the formation of the city's elected government in 1841 the administration of the municipality was left in the hands of a selected group of men. The first mayor was elected to council and chosen for this position by his peers in council.

Prior 1850 the mayor was elected amongst the elected councillors. The first mayor elected directly by citizens was William Caldwell. The mayor continues to act as a councillor-at-large and has a direct vote on all council decisions.

== 19th Century ==
- Stephen Binney 1841 – 1842
- Edward Kenny 1842
- Thomas Williamson 1842 – 1843
- Alexander Keith 1843 – 1844
- Hugh Bell 1844 – 1845
- Andrew MacKinlay 1845 – ?1846
- Joseph Jennings 1846 – 1847
- William Machin Stairs 1847 – 1848
- Adam Hemmeon 1848 – 1849
- Henry Pryor 1849 – 1850
- William Caldwell 1850 – 1851
- Andrew MacKinlay 1851 – 1852
- Alexander Keith 1852 – 1853
- Henry Pryor 1853 – 1855
- Archibald Scott 1855 – 1857
- Henry Pryor 1857 – 1859
- Samuel Richard Caldwell 1859 – 1861
- Philip Carteret Hill 1861 – 1864
- Matthew Henry Richey 1864 – 1867
- Stephen Tobin 1867 – 1870
- William Alexander Henry 1870 – 1871
- William Dunbar 1871 – 1872
- James Duggan 1872 – 1873
- John Archibald Sinclair 1873 – 1875
- Matthew Henry Richey 1875 – 1878
- Stephen Tobin 1878 – 1881
- George Fraser 1881 – 1884
- James Crosskill Mackintosh 1884 – 1887
- Patrick O'Mullin 1887 – 1889
- David McPherson 1889 – 1892
- Michael Edwin Keefe 1892 – 1895
- David McPherson 1895 – 1897
- Alexander Stephen Jr. 1897 – 1899

== Twentieth century ==
- James Thompson Hamilton 1899 – 1902
- Adam Brown Crosby 1902 – 1905
- Robert Thomas MacIlreith 1905 – 1908
- Adam Brown Crosby 1908 – 1909
- Joseph Andrew Chisholm 1909 – 1912
- Frederick Pennington Bligh 1912 – 1915
- Peter Francis Martin 1915 – 1918
- Arthur Charles Hawkins 1918 – 1919
- John Seakons Parker 1919 – 1922
- John Murphy 1922 – 1925
- Joseph Burke Kenny 1925 – 1928
- Louis Amable Castonguay 1928 – 1931
- George Edwin Ritchie 1931 – 1932
- Albert Audley Thompson 1932 – 1934
- Edward Joseph Cragg 1934 – 1937
- Walter Mitchell 1937 – 1940
- William Edward Donovan 1940 – 1943
- John Edward Lloyd 1943 – 1945
- Allan MacDougall Butler 1945 – 1946
- John Edward Ahern 1946 – 1949
- Gordon Stanley Kinley 1949 – 1952
- Richard Alphonsus Donahoe 1952 – 1955
- Leonard Arthur Kitz 1955 – 1957
- Charles Augustus Vaughan 1957 – 1960
- John Edward Lloyd 1960 – 1963
- Charles Augustus Vaughan 1963 – 1966
- Allan O'Brien 1966 – 1971
- Walter Fitzgerald 1971 – 1974
- Edmund L. Morris 1974 – 1980
- Ronald Hanson 1980
- Ronald Wallace 1980 – 1991
- Moira Leiper Ducharme 1991 – 1994
- Walter Fitzgerald 1994 – 1996 (¹)

== Notes ==
- (¹) W.R. Fitzgerald presided over municipal amalgamation which saw the City of Halifax combined with the City of Dartmouth, Town of Bedford and Halifax County. Fitzgerald subsequently ran for election as mayor of the Halifax Regional Municipality and won, becoming the last mayor of the City of Halifax and the first mayor of HRM.

== See also ==
- List of mayors of the Halifax Regional Municipality 1996–present
- List of mayors of Dartmouth, Nova Scotia 1873 – 1996
- List of mayors of Bedford, Nova Scotia 1979 – 1996
- List of wardens of Halifax County, Nova Scotia 1880 – 1996
