= George Campbell =

George Campbell may refer to:

== Sportsmen ==
- George Campbell (rugby union) (1872–1924), Scotland international rugby union player
- George Campbell (footballer, born 1957), Scottish footballer
- George Campbell (footballer, born 1864) (1864–1898), Scottish footballer
- George Campbell (footballer, born 1920), Scottish footballer
- George Campbell (New Zealand footballer), association football player who represented New Zealand
- George Campbell (lacrosse) (1878–1972), Canadian dentist and sportsman
- George Campbell (cricketer, born 1979), English cricketer
- George Campbell (cricketer, born 1847) (1847–1930), English cricketer
- George Campbell (cricketer, born 1893) (1893–1977), South African cricketer, British Army officer, and physician
- George Campbell (American football) (born 1996), high school football All-American
- George P. Campbell (1871–?), American football and basketball coach, teacher, and administrator
- George Campbell (soccer) (born 2001), American soccer player

== Politicians ==
- George Campbell (Australian politician) (born 1943), senator from the Australian Labor Party in New South Wales
- George Campbell (New South Wales politician) (1827–1890), member of the New South Wales Parliament
- George W. Campbell (1769–1848), American statesman
- George W. Campbell (1810–1887), Minnesota politician
- George Campbell, 6th Duke of Argyll (1768–1839), Whig MP
- George Campbell (civil servant) (1824–1892), Scottish member of parliament
- George Campbell, 8th Duke of Argyll (1823–1900), Scottish Liberal politician
- George Campbell (Canadian politician) (1844–?), farmer and political figure in Ontario
- George Glover Campbell (1887–1967), Australian politician, member of the New South Wales Legislative Assembly
- Sir George Campbell, statesman

== Others ==
- George Campbell of Inverneill (1803–1882), commandant of the Royal Artillery and served in the East India Company
- George Campbell (18th-century minister) (1719–1796), Scottish Enlightenment philosopher, minister, theologian, and professor of divinity
- George Campbell (19th-century minister)
- Sir George Campbell (Royal Navy officer) (1759–1821)
- George Campbell (1838–1915), Congregational minister, father of Alexander Petrie Campbell
- George Campbell (murder victim) (died 1872), Canadian farmer who was murdered by his wife
- George Campbell (town marshal) (1850–1881), town marshal for El Paso, TX, one of four victims killed in the Four Dead in Five Seconds Gunfight
- George Ashley Campbell (1870–1954), American electrical engineer
- George L. Campbell (1912–2004), Scottish polyglot and linguist at the BBC
- George M. Campbell (1907–1942), United States Navy officer and Navy Cross recipient
- George Campbell (painter) (1917–1979), Irish painter and writer
- George Campbell Jr. (born 1945), president of the Cooper Union
- George William Robert Campbell (1835–1905), British colonial police inspector in British Ceylon
- George S. Campbell (1851–1927), Scottish-Canadian banker
