= George Fraser (Nova Scotia politician) =

Canadian politician

George Fraser Esq.

27th Mayor of Halifax
- In office Oct 1881 – Oct 1883
- Preceded by: Stephen Tobin
- Succeeded by: James Crosskill Mackintosh

Personal details
- Born: George Fraser
- Died: 1899 Truro, Nova Scotia, Canada
- Profession: Politician

George Fraser (died 1899) was a Canadian businessman and politician who served as Mayor of Halifax from 1881 to 1883 in Nova Scotia, Canada.

== Career ==
Early in his career, he worked as an accountant for Alexander Keith. He managed Alex. Keith & Son (now Alexander Keith's Brewery) during the 1860s.

Fraser acquired the controlling interests of Turtle Grove Brewery following John J. D. Oland's death in 1869, eventually renaming it the Army and Navy Brewery. He brought significant capital, business knowledge, and technical expertise to the brewery, upgrading outdated steam machinery with electric equipment, expanding the facilities to double capacity, excavating a storage cellar, and importing malt and hops from Europe, which helped the Army and Navy Brewery become a serious competitor to Alex. Keith & Son. Fraser formed a new partnership called Fraser, Oland, and Company in 1873 that included Oland's sons John Culverwell Oland and Conrad George Oland as well as William Lowe. In 1877, Fraser sold his stake to Susannah Oland, John Oland's mother, who renamed the firm S. Oland, Sons, and Company (now Oland Brewery).

== Political career ==
=== City Alderman ===
He served three terms as Halifax's Ward 1 alderman, from 1872 to 1873, 1877 to 1880, and 1880 to 1881.

=== Mayor of Halifax ===
He was nominated for the office of mayor by Charles F. DeWolf on September 23, 1881. Fraser was elected as the 27th Mayor of the City of Halifax in October 1881, succeeding Stephen Tobin. In August 1882, Fraser received the backing of the Board of Aldermen, who praised his first-term leadership as Chief Magistrate and pledged to support his re‑election as mayor of Halifax. He was put forward as a candidate for mayor in the 1882 municipal elections by William Chamberlain Silver. The following year, he was nominated again by Joseph Seeton. He held three successive one-year terms from 1881 to 1883.

During his tenure as mayor of Halifax, he presided over city council meetings that addressed municipal affairs such as budget appropriations, public lighting contracts, and infrastructure concerns, including petitions regarding flooding and water service extensions. At a city council meeting in May 1884, Fraser thanked council members for their support as he vacated the chair, remarking that he had performed his duties conscientiously and fearlessly. The aldermen spoke highly of the retiring mayor's service. He was followed in office by James Crosskill Mackintosh.

== Personal life ==
In 1872, Fraser purchased a house on Queen Street in Halifax for $4,000. He later took up his permanent residence in Truro, Nova Scotia, in 1888.

== Death ==
In an incident reported on February 28, 1889, by The Truro Sun, Fraser fell down the stairs of his Truro residence the previous night, sustaining severe injuries that rendered him unconscious. He remained undiscovered until a household servant found him around 6:00 a.m. the following morning. The local press reported that his condition was grave, remaining unconscious with serious concerns about his recovery. Fraser's death had occurred by March 1, 1889, as reported in The Kingston Daily News.
