= David McPherson (Nova Scotia politician) =

Canadian shipbuilder and politician (1832-1914)

The Honourable David McPherson
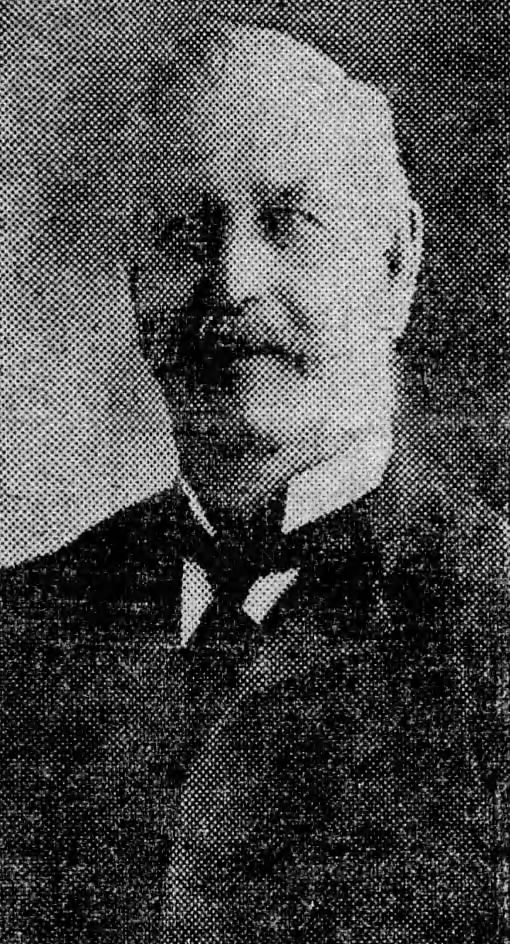

38th Mayor of Halifax
- In office 1889–1892
- Preceded by: Patrick O'Mullin
- Succeeded by: Michael Edwin Keefe

40th Mayor of Halifax
- In office 1895–1897
- Preceded by: Michael Edwin Keefe
- Succeeded by: Alexander Stephen Jr.

Personal details
- Born: David McPherson; 1 August 1832 Jordan Falls, Shelburne County, Nova Scotia, Canada
- Died: 12 August 1914 (aged 82) Halifax, Nova Scotia, Canada
- Party: Liberal
- Profession: Shipbuilder; Politician

David McPherson (1 August 1832 – 1914) was a Canadian shipbuilder and politician in Nova Scotia who was elected Mayor of Halifax twice.

== Early life ==
David McPherson was born of Scottish descent on 1 August 1832 in Jordan River (now Jordan Falls), Shelburne County, Nova Scotia, Canada. His parents were John and Elizabeth McPherson. He was educated in his early years at a grammar school in Shelburne.

== Career ==
McPherson arrived in Halifax, Nova Scotia, as a young man and entered the shipbuilding industry, soon developing a successful shipbuilding enterprise. He became the managing owner of the ship Ripple in 1866, with Halifax as its port of registry. He was advertised in McAlpine's Halifax City Directory for 1869-70 as a shipbuilder.

McPherson was among the founding figures of the Halifax and Prince Edward Island Steamship Company, Limited, established in 1889 for the acquisition and operation of steamships. He was appointed as one of the first provisional directors, alongside William Anderson Black and Henry Gibson Bauld.

At the annual meeting of the Yarmouth Steamship Company on 21 February 1894, he was elected to the board of directors, succeeding W.D. Lovitt.

== Political career ==
His interest in public affairs began at 35, leading to his election to Halifax City Council. For 25 years starting in the mid-1860s, shipbuilder David McPherson had an office on the Halifax wharf while holding roles as a city alderman, Halifax mayor, legislative assembly member, and provincial cabinet minister.

=== City Alderman ===
David McPherson served as an alderman for Halifax's Ward 6 from 1875 to 1876. He was re-elected for additional terms from 1878 to 1879, 1881 to 1882, and 1887 to 1888.

=== Mayor of Halifax ===
David McPherson was first elected Mayor of Halifax in 1889. In McAlpine's Halifax City Directory for 1890-91, he was located at the mayor's office at Halifax City Hall on Duke Street. Mayor McPherson hosted 1,200 citizens on 22 May 1890, inviting them to explore the new Halifax City Hall while the 63rd Regiment's band played. His term continued until 1892, after which he was succeeded by Michael Edwin Keefe. McPherson was re-elected as Halifax's mayor for the 1895–1897 term, followed by Alexander Stephen Jr.

Formed on 20 July 1896, he was part of the Murray Ministry under Hon. George Henry Murray, Nova Scotia's eighth premier and provincial secretary. He served alongside J.W. Longley, Charles E. Church, Thomas Johnson, A.H. Comeau, A. McGillivray, T.R. Black, and W.T. Pipes.

Summoned to the General Assembly of Nova Scotia in 1897, he took his seat on 27 January 1898 for the first session of the 32nd General Assembly, representing Halifax County. By 1901, there was a Liberal Majority under McPherson, George Mitchell, and Michael Edwin Keefe. Ahead of the 1911 Nova Scotia general election, the incumbent Nova Scotia House of Assembly member decided not to run for re-election.

McPherson was appointed to the Legislative Council of Nova Scotia by the provincial government on 1 March 1912.

== Personal life ==
David McPherson was a Presbyterian by faith and a Liberal in politics. On 18 July 1876, the 43-year-old shipbuilder married a 32-year-old Susanna McDaniel of Halifax. His wife worked with the Protestant Orphans' Home, a charitable institution. Mayor McPherson was a member and president of the Nova Scotia Society for Prevention of Cruelty in 1890. In Halifax, he resided at 40 South Park Street.

== Death ==
David McPherson died at 82 years old on 12 August 1914 in Halifax, Nova Scotia, Canada. He was buried at Camp Hill Cemetery.
