= Samuel Richard Caldwell =

Canadian politician (1813–1905)

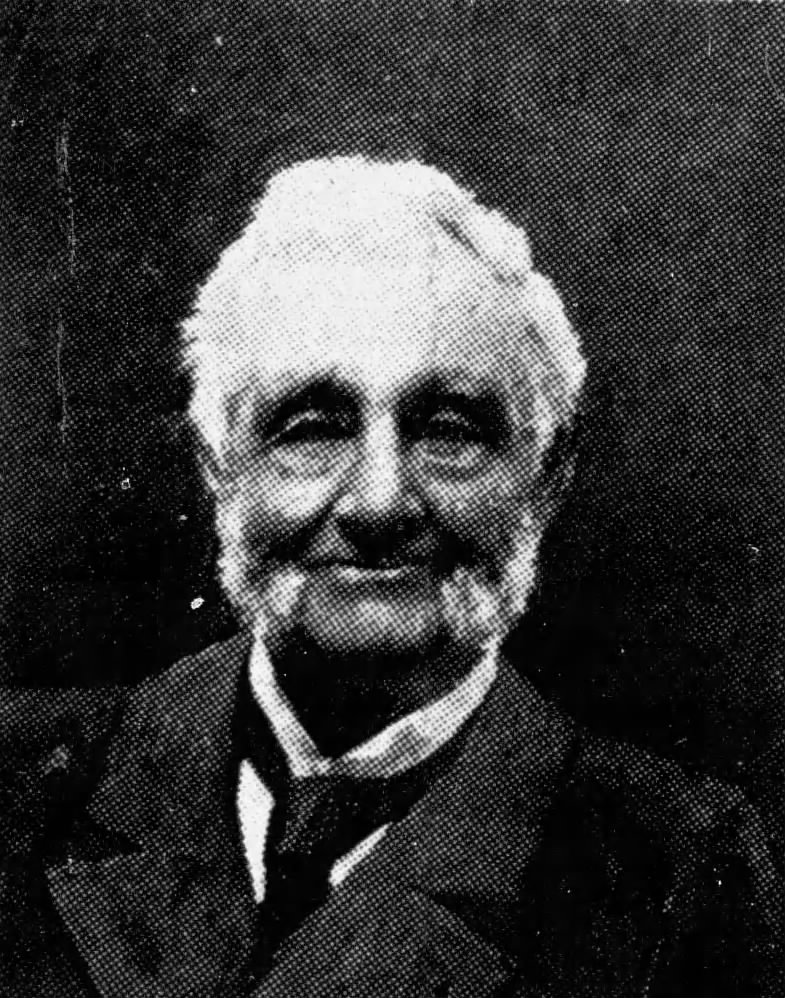

17th Mayor of Halifax
- In office 1859–1860
- Preceded by: Henry Pryor
- Succeeded by: Philip Carteret Hill

Personal details
- Born: Samuel Richard Caldwell; May 11, 1813 Halifax, Nova Scotia, Canada
- Died: April 4, 1905 (aged 91) Halifax, Nova Scotia, Canada
- Profession: Blacksmith; Fireman; Politician

Samuel Richard Caldwell (May 11, 1813–April 4, 1905) was a Canadian merchant, fireman, and politician in Nova Scotia who was elected the 17th mayor of Halifax.

== Early life ==
Samuel Richard Caldwell was born on May 11, 1813, in the Colony of Nova Scotia. His father was William Caldwell who served as Halifax mayor in 1850.

== Career ==
Samuel R. Caldwell followed in his father's footsteps as a blacksmith. He partnered with his brother William for many years in the blacksmith trade. Operating from Caldwell's Wharf, they served as ship smiths and completed much of the heavy work that modern equipment now replaces.

=== Fireman ===
He first joined the Union Engine Company (now Halifax Fire and Emergency) in May 1835. Caldwell was among the firemen with the No. 1 fire engine based at St. Paul's Church.

Caldwell rose through the ranks over time. He held the post of second lieutenant from January 1844 until his promotion to first lieutenant in August 1845. He served in the fire company of 1846, where his father held the position of captain.

He became captain of the Union Fire Company in December 1855. After serving until November 1859, he was awarded a gold medal upon retiring to take office as mayor.

== Political career ==
=== Alderman ===
The fire company captain served as alderman of Ward 2 in 1856 and in 1857.

=== Mayor of Halifax ===
Samuel Richard Caldwell was elected mayor of Halifax for two years, serving from 1859 to 1860 after succeeding Henry Pryor. He was the 11th mayor since the incorporation of the City of Halifax in 1842.

Caldwell, during his tenure as mayor, prioritized fire prevention and equality among social classes. In 1860, he and Alderman Philip Carteret Hill acquired two steam fire engines from the U.S.

Spurred by Britain's Volunteer Force movement after the Crimean War, he joined one of thirty-two volunteer companies raised throughout Nova Scotia. Samuel R. Caldwell was among the members of the society incorporated as the Halifax Volunteer Band Committee on May 12, 1860. He represented the volunteer company, the Halifax Engineers, on May 14, 1860, at a meeting in Lt. Thomas C. Haliburton's office. The meeting led to the creation of the Halifax Volunteer Battalion, the third battalion formed across British North America. Although represented at the meeting, the Halifax Engineers decided against joining the other volunteer companies.

The Halifax mayor oversaw the visit of the Prince of Wales, Edward VII, and welcomed the future king at the dockyard during the summer of 1860.

Caldwell was succeeded by P.C. Hill, who later became Premier of Nova Scotia. In a letter to the Acadian Recorder that year, he affirmed, "My only aim was to serve the public interest of all classes of my fellow citizens."

=== H.M. Customs ===
S.R. Caldwell was appointed to the department of customs for the port of Halifax, then known as Her Majesty's Customs before the Confederation of Canada. He was appointed to the Gauger's Department on August 1, 1863.

On June 14, 1883, he was transferred to the surveyorship. Caldwell then served as a surveyor in H.M. Customs. At his retirement in late May 1887, he was given a formal statement of appreciation and a gold-headed cane by the staff of the custom house.

== Personal life ==
William Caldwell Jr., his brother, was a prominent member of the Orange Order in Canada and a former Grandmaster of Nova Scotia.

Samuel Richard married Margaret Irving in 1858. He had a total of nine children—four sons and five daughters.

In 1858, he developed six properties on Queen Street (1520–34) in Ward 2. Between 1860 and 1863, he constructed two identical houses at 1529–33 Birmingham Street.

Caldwell settled in Falmouth, Nova Scotia, around his 1887 retirement and returned to Halifax in 1893.

== Death ==
Samuel Richard Caldwell died on April 4, 1905, in Halifax, Nova Scotia, Canada.
