= William Caldwell (Nova Scotia politician) =

Canadian blacksmith and politician (1793–1854)

11th Mayor of Halifax
- In office 1850–1851
- Preceded by: Henry Pryor
- Succeeded by: Andrew MacKinlay

Personal details
- Born: William Caldwell; 1793 Horton Township (now Wolfville), Nova Scotia, Canada
- Died: 1854 Halifax, Nova Scotia, Canada
- Profession: Blacksmith; Fireman; Politician

William Caldwell (1793–1854) was a Canadian blacksmith, fireman, and political figure in Nova Scotia who was elected the 11th Mayor of Halifax.

== Early life ==
William Caldwell was born of Irish descent in the Colony of Nova Scotia during the late 18th century.

== Career ==
William Caldwell was described as a ship's blacksmith "without the benefit of a liberal education."

=== Fireman ===
In 1835, he was part of the Union Engine Company (now Halifax Regional Fire and Emergency) stationed at St. Paul's Church, serving as lieutenant alongside fire warden William Stairs. By 1846, Caldwell had been appointed captain of the Union Engine Company, serving for nearly 25 years and gaining recognition for his service in the city's fire brigades.

== Political career ==
=== Councillor ===
At its incorporation in 1841, Halifax formed a corporation comprising a mayor, six aldermen, and twelve councillors, with aldermen responsible for electing the mayor until 1849. Between 1841 and 1842, the fireman served as a common councillor representing Ward 3 in Halifax.

=== Alderman ===
William Caldwell served two terms as alderman of Ward 3, first from 1842 to 1845, then again in 1849.

As an alderman, Caldwell served on a series of Halifax City Council committees. In 1843, he was part of a committee tasked with replacing the decommissioned Fire Engine No. 3 for the local department. Working with John Longard and others, he helped evaluate engine options and later co-authored a report favoring London sourcing, finalized in June 1844.

=== Mayor of Halifax ===
William Caldwell was elected mayor of Halifax in 1850, succeeding Henry Pryor. He was the first mayor chosen by a direct vote of the citizens. William Caldwell served a single term from October 1850 to October 1851. He was followed in office by Andrew MacKinlay.

== Personal life ==
His son, Samuel Richard Caldwell, was born in Halifax on May 11, 1813. Samuel, also a blacksmith, ran for Halifax mayor in 1859.

William Caldwell was an active member and veteran of the Orange Order in Nova Scotia. His Halifax residence was located on the northwest corner of Robie Street and Jubilee Road. The house was designed by architect Henry G. Hill and built by David Cader in 1840. Registered on the Canadian Register of Historic Places, it was formally recognized for its heritage value on February 2, 1982.
