= Alexander Stephen Jr. =

Canadian politician (1845–1920)

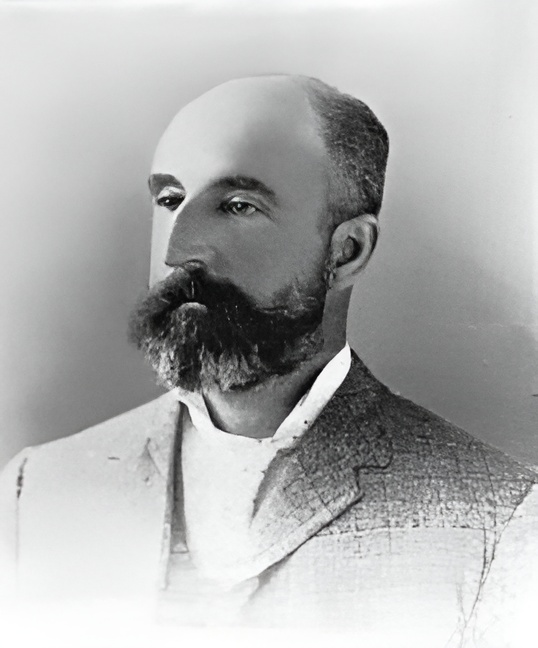

41st Mayor of Halifax
- In office 1897–1899
- Preceded by: David McPherson
- Succeeded by: James Thompson Hamilton

Personal details
- Born: Alexander Stephen Jr. 9 November 1845 Musquodoboit, Nova Scotia, Canada
- Died: 7 November 1920 (aged 74) Halifax, Nova Scotia, Canada
- Party: Liberal Party
- Spouse: Saidie Cogswell
- Profession: Merchant; Politician

Alexander Stephen Jr. (9 November 1845 – 7 November 1920) was a Canadian merchant and political figure in Nova Scotia who became the 41st Mayor of Halifax from 1897 to 1899.

== Early life ==
Alexander Stephen Jr., of Scottish descent, was born on 9 November 1845 in Musquodoboit, Nova Scotia, Canada.

Born to Alexander Stephen and Mary Ann Gould, he was the eldest son. His father emigrated from Rothes, Aberdeenshire, Scotland, to Nova Scotia in 1834 to pursue business. Stephen Jr. received his early education at the Free Church Academy and Horton College. He served as a captain in the 9th Halifax Militia before the Canadian Confederation and, by 1867, held the same rank in the militia reserve.

== Career ==
Alexander Stephen Jr. joined his father's firm, A. Stephen & Son, a furniture and wooden ware manufacturer in Halifax, Nova Scotia. He eventually became the president and managing director of the Nova Scotia Furnishing Company, which succeeded the firm of A. Stephen & Co. The business, the largest of its kind in the Maritime Provinces, was founded in 1864 by his father. Alexander joined as a partner in 1870 and took over full control when his father retired in 1879. In 1885, he brought in G.A. Wilson and James Reeves as co-partners, with Reeves serving as treasurer. The company remained under the same management following its incorporation, with department heads retaining their positions. Around 1887, a carpet department was introduced, becoming a successful addition to the business. His business operations included a factory on Grafton Street, extending through Albermarle Street, and ware rooms at the corner of Barrington and Prince streets. The company, originally A. Stephen & Son, expanded to include house furnishings, carpets, oilcloths, and draperies.

== Political career ==
=== City Alderman ===
Alexander Stephen Jr. served as a Halifax alderman, first elected in 1882 and reelected in 1885. During his tenure, he held several key positions, including chairman of the Board of Works and chairman of the Halifax Public Gardens Commission. In 1885, he served as a joint delegate, alongside Mayor James Crosskill Mackintosh and Hon. Dr. Farrell, in the St. John–Halifax delegation to Ottawa concerning the Dry Dock and Short Line Railway. He was also a member of the executive committee for the 1881 Dominion Exhibition and played a significant role in its success. Stephen was an active promoter of the Victoria School of Art and Design (now NSCAD), established in Halifax in 1887 to commemorate Queen Victoria's Golden Jubilee. A dedicated Freemason, he was a Royal Arch Mason and Past Master of Virgin Lodge No. 3, RNS, with which he had been affiliated for two decades. Politically, he was a Liberal and a strong advocate for free trade, despite his involvement in the furniture and house furnishings industry, a highly protected sector.

He was featured in A Cyclopaedia of Canadian Biography Being Chiefly Men of the Time by George Maclean Rose in 1888.

Appointed in 1894 to the newly incorporated Halifax Exhibition Commission, Alexander Stephen Jr. represented the Halifax County Agricultural Society in planning provincial and city exhibitions.

=== Mayor of Halifax ===
Succeeding David McPherson, Alexander Stephen Jr. was first elected Mayor of Halifax in 1897 and held the position until 1899. On 10 November 1897, he officially approved a certificate approving tracks laid in the city by the Halifax Electric Tramway Co., Ltd.

== Personal life ==
Residing in Halifax, Alexander Stephen Jr. lived at 127 South Park St. He followed the Presbyterian faith. On 19 August 1873, he wed Saidie S. Cogswell, daughter of the late Rev. John E. Cogswell of Halifax, and later had children.

== Death ==
Alexander Stephen Jr. died on 7 November 1920 in Halifax, Nova Scotia, Canada. He was buried at Camp Hill Cemetery.
