= Andrew MacKinlay (Nova Scotia politician) =

Scottish-Canadian businessman and politician (1800–1867)

6th Mayor of Halifax
- In office 1845–1846
- Preceded by: Hugh Bell
- Succeeded by: Joseph Jennings

12th Mayor of Halifax
- In office 1851–1852
- Preceded by: William Caldwell
- Succeeded by: Alexander Keith

Personal details
- Born: Andrew MacKinlay; 1800 Stirlingshire, Scotland
- Died: 29 September 1867 (aged 66–67) Halifax, Nova Scotia, Canada
- Occupation: Politician

Andrew MacKinlay (1800 – 29 September 1867) was a Scottish-Canadian businessman and political figure in Nova Scotia who was elected Mayor of Halifax in 1845 and 1851.

== Early life ==
Andrew MacKinlay was born in 1800 in Stirlingshire, Scotland.

At an early age, he moved to Canada, then still a dominion of the British Empire. He settled in the Colony of Nova Scotia.

== Career ==
By 1826, he had opened a book and stationery store in Halifax, Nova Scotia, and in 1827, his brother William joined him to form A. and W. MacKinlay Ltd. The firm sold stationery and books, printed academic and religious texts, published local works, and produced educational maps.

MacKinlay joined the North British Society of Halifax in 1829 and went on to serve in various charitable organizations. In 1835, he entered the field of education by joining the Halifax Mechanics' Institute, which specialized in adult education in the natural sciences.

== Political career ==
=== Councillor ===
When the city of Halifax was incorporated in 1841, it established a corporation consisting of a mayor, six aldermen, and twelve councillors. MacKinlay served as a councillor for Ward 5 from 1841 to 1845.

Among his business interests was the Halifax Gas, Light, and Water Company, established in 1840. He became a director in 1842 and served as president from 1855 to his death.

MacKinlay, then a city councillor, was appointed among the first commissioners of the Provincial Penitentiary. He visited the facility during its opening week on 1 July 1844.

=== Mayor of Halifax ===
In 1845, he became the 6th Mayor of Halifax, succeeding Hugh Bell and serving until 1846.

In September 1848, Andrew MacKinlay was appointed one of seven governors of Dalhousie Collegiate School (now Dalhousie University), alongside William Young, Joseph Howe, Hugh Bell, James Avery, William Grigor, and John Naylor. He served as a member of the board for Dalhousie College until 1867.

Beginning in 1850, mayors were elected directly by citizens rather than appointed by fellow aldermen, under a statute that held until 1853. Following William Caldwell, he became mayor of Halifax for a second time, serving from 1851 to 1852. He was succeeded in office by Alexander Keith.

He was elected as president of the North British Society in November 1854.

The former mayor was appointed Custos of Halifax County by the mid-1850s. He helped found the Halifax School for the Deaf in 1856. He played a key role in securing Nova Scotia Legislature and community support, forming a board of management, and ensuring the school's proper founding and outfitting. He served as the first president of its board.

At the 1867 Paris Exposition, his firm's 1862 map of Nova Scotia was recognized with a bronze medal for Best Regional Cartography.

== Personal life ==
His son, Col. Andrew K. MacKinlay, continued the family book and stationery firm. He was also a militiaman and colonel of the 63rd Rifles.

== Death ==
Andrew MacKinlay died at 67 years old on 29 September 1867 in Halifax, Nova Scotia, Canada.
