= James Crosskill Mackintosh =

Canadian banker, broker, and politician (1839-1924)

James C. Mackintosh Esq.
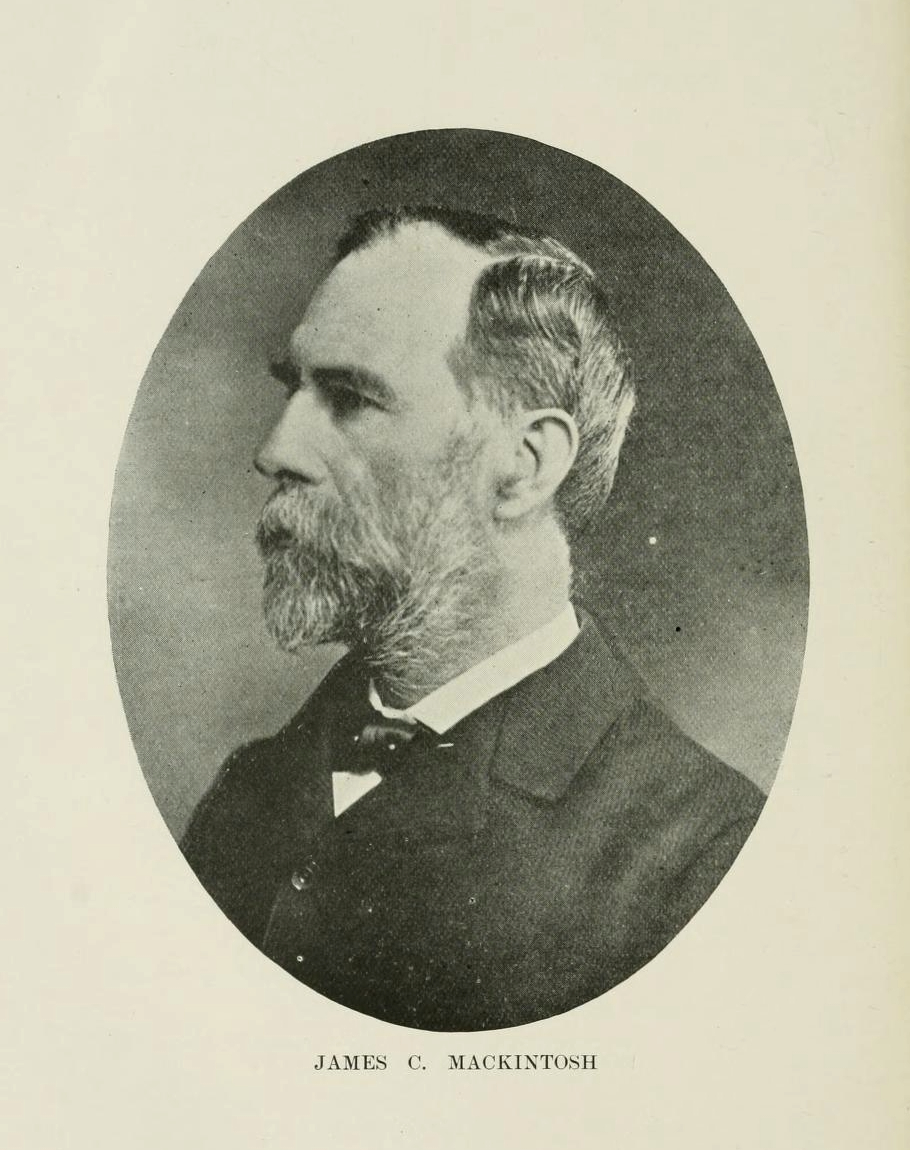

36th Mayor of Halifax
- In office 1884–1887
- Preceded by: George Fraser
- Succeeded by: Patrick O'Mullin

Personal details
- Born: James Crosskill Mackintosh; 1 February 1839 Halifax, Nova Scotia, Canada
- Died: 18 May 1924 (aged 85) Halifax, Nova Scotia, Canada
- Party: Conservative
- Profession: Banker; Stockbroker; Politician

James Crosskill Mackintosh (1 February 1839 – 8 May 1924) was a Canadian banker, stockbroker, and political figure in Nova Scotia who served as Mayor of Halifax.

== Early life and education ==
James Crosskill Mackintosh was born on 1 February 1839 in Halifax, Nova Scotia, Canada.

He was the son of John Mackintosh, a Scottishman who resided in Halifax when he was born. His father emigrated from Inverness, Scotland, while his mother, Mary Catherine Crosskill, was born of Scottish descent in Nova Scotia.

Educated at St. John's School and the Halifax Free Church Academy (now the Atlantic School of Theology), Mackintosh left school at 16 years old.

== Career ==
He joined the Bank of Nova Scotia as a clerk, starting his apprenticeship as an assistant cashier in 1855. J. C. Mackintosh was appointed as the first official accountant at the Bank of Nova Scotia in 1857.

He joined the North British Society in 1859 and became its secretary in 1860. He was later on the general committee for the Halifax Young Men's Christian Association in 1869-70. J. C. Mackintosh, a Presbyterian, was among the founders of Fort Massey Presbyterian Church in 1871 where he served multiple roles.

After leaving the Bank of Nova Scotia in 1873, Mackintosh launched a private bank in partnership with Mather Byles Almon. The firm was known as Almon & Mackintosh, Bankers and Brokers with offices at 39 Tower Road before relocating to 166 Hollis Street.

Mackintosh joined the Halifax Stock Exchange, founded on 1 January 1874, as a broker and later became its president. During the mid-1870s, he became an agent for the Prince Edward Island Steam Navigation Company.

Mackintosh held roles as junior and senior vice president in the North British Society before his election as president in 1877. Around this time, he had begun a separate firm from Almon & Mackintosh under J. C. Mackintosh & Co. He eventually expanded the brokerage and banking firm to include branches in Montreal, St. John, N.B., Fredericton, and New Glasgow.

The banker and general financial agent served on the executive committee for the Halifax Chamber of Commerce in 1878.

== Political career ==
=== City Alderman ===
J. C. Mackintosh became involved in politics and was elected to Halifax City Council in 1878. He served as an alderman and justice of the peace for the City of Halifax for five years under Stephen Tobin and George Fraser. On 22 October 1878, he compiled a report on the condition of the financial affairs of the province. During the 1880s, he worked on the Board of Health and Board of Commissioners of City Works. As an alderman, he was a driving force behind assessment reforms and successfully introduced a better tax collection and accounting system in City Council.

=== Mayor of Halifax ===
In 1884, he was elected as the Mayor of Halifax, replacing George Fraser in office. He held the role until 1887 and was succeeded by Patrick O'Mullin after his term ended. As mayor, he initiated public works projects, including the foundation of the Halifax Dry Dock and the renovation of Grand Parade. He also played a key role in starting a regular ferry service between Dartmouth and Halifax.

J. C. Mackintosh was appointed to the international committee of the Halifax Young Men's Christian Association in July 1886. He later served as the president of the Halifax chapter. Named vice president of the Victoria School of Art and Design (now NSCAD) in 1888, he held the position for one term before continuing as a director and acting as an auditor in 1897.

In 1889, he was serving as vice-president of Starr Manufacturing Co. which was presided over by William James Stairs.

He led the Society for the Prevention of Cruelty to Animals (SPCA) in Nova Scotia as president during 1890–91. A longtime supporter of the Halifax School for the Blind, Mackintosh was named a benefactor in 1892 after a decade on the board of directors. In 1898, he was serving as the school's vice president and in multiple standing committees.

On 6 February 1893, Mackintosh was elected president of the Nova Scotia Bible Society, the Nova Scotia branch of the British and Foreign Bible Society.

He joined T. E. Kenny, Thomas Fysche, and J. F. Stairs in founding the Eastern Trust Company in 1893. On 7 April of that year, he was appointed as a provisional director.

As a member of the Halifax Board of Trade (now Halifax Chamber of Commerce), he served on the Board of Arbitrators by the mid-1890s.

Serving as president in 1895, James C. Mackintosh oversaw the Y.M.C.A. in Halifax and its Richmond branch. He chaired the organization's provincial committee for the Maritime provinces as a corresponding member of the international committee.

His son-in-law John E. Wood became a partner in J. C. Mackintosh & Co. in 1904 after marrying his daughter Gertrude Mary Mackintosh. That year, J. C. Mackintosh was elected to the Board of Directors of the Dartmouth Electric Light Company. He held the roles of vice president and director at the Eastern Canada Savings & Loan Co., Ltd, under the presidency of S.M. Brookfield. By 1905, Mackintosh held a seat on the board of governors of Dalhousie College until 1919.

In 1914, Mackintosh held several prominent business positions which included president of Starr Manufacturing Co. and a director of both Eastern Trust Co. and St. Croix Lumber Co. He retained control of his banking business until 1922, when he was forced to transfer control to his son A. F. Mackintosh and J. E. Wood.

== Personal life ==
J. C. Mackintosh married Emma Isabel Grant on 15 April 1869 and had a son named Alexander Forrester Mackintosh in 1877. His wife was heavily involved with the Local Council of Women of Halifax as its president.

Politically, J. C. aligned with the Conservative Party of Canada. He attended Hon. Charles Tupper's speech on 16 November 1875 in Halifax. He participated in various societies as well as civic and educational organizations. He became a member of the Halifax Club. He supported the Halifax Protestant Industrial School as early as 1875. He later joined the Canadian Club of Halifax in 1907.

The investment banker was a shareholder of the Bank of British North America by the late 1890s.

== Death ==
James Crosskill Mackintosh died on 8 May 1924 in Halifax, Nova Scotia, Canada.

== Works ==
- Memoranda on the short-line railway question (1885)
- The mayor's address and general review of affairs of the city government (1886)
