= Edward Kenny =

Canadian politician

The Honourable Sir Edward Kenny PC

Senator from Nova Scotia
- In office 23 October 1867 – 11 April 1876

2nd Mayor of Halifax
- In office 1842–1842
- Preceded by: Stephen Binney
- Succeeded by: Thomas Williamson

Personal details
- Born: 1 July 1800 County Kerry, Kingdom of Ireland
- Died: 16 May 1891 (aged 90) Halifax, Nova Scotia
- Party: Conservative
- Spouse: Ann Forrestall (13 children)
- Profession: Businessman, militia officer
- Portfolio: Receiver General, President of the Privy Council

Sir Edward Kenny, PC (1 July 1800 – 16 May 1891) was a Canadian politician and businessman. He co-founded the Union and Merchants' banks and served as Mayor of Halifax. He was a Conservative senator from 1867 to 1876.

== Early life and business career ==
Kenny was born in County Kerry, Ireland, the son of Jeremiah Kenny (of Ballykeally, Esq.) and Johanna (née Crean). He began working for James Lyons, a merchant with connections with Halifax, Nova Scotia, and moved to the city in 1824 where he worked as Assistant manager at James Lyons and Co. In 1827, he and his older brother, Thomas Kenny of Sherwood, opened their own company in Halifax, T. & E. Kenny - Dry Goods & Shipping.

Kenny married Ann Forrestall (daughter of Michael Forrestall, Esq., of Halifax) in Halifax on 16 October 1832. Together they had 13 children, 7 boys and 6 girls. The first born, Thomas Edward Kenny, born 12 October 1833 in Halifax, later became president of the Royal Bank of Canada.

In 1855, he became Director of the Union Bank in Halifax. On 26 April 1864, he opened the Merchant's Bank, which later became the Royal Bank of Canada, with seven partners (J.W. Merkell, T.C. Kinnear, James B. Duffus, William Cunard, John Tobin, George P. Mitchell and Jeremiah Nothup). In 1872, Kenny became a director of Sir Hugh Allan's Canadian Pacific Railway.

Kenny was a representative of Canada's Catholic population. On 8 February 1872, he travelled with Lady Kenny to Rome to meet Pope Pius IX.

== Political career ==
Kenny became Junior Assistant V.P. of the Charitable Irish Society of Halifax in 1834 and Vice President in 1836. He became president of the organization in 1841.

In 1841, he was appointed a Member of the Legislative Council of Nova Scotia, becoming its president on 9 April 1856, replacing Michael Tobin, Jr. He was also elected an Alderman for Ward 3 in Halifax in 1841. In 1842, he was elected Mayor of Halifax.

On 22 January 1862, Kenny and 14 other distinguished gentlemen of Halifax met in the Hollis Street office of Robie Uniacke to organize what was to become known as The Halifax Club. The other founding members of the club were William A. Black, Mathers Byles Almon, Edward Binney, Captain W.W. Lyttleton, Colonel W.J. Myers, S.A. White, James C. Cogswell, Henry Pryor, John Tobin, Robert Morrow, Alfred G. Jones, M.B. Almon Jr. and William Cunard.

In May 1867, Kenny was appointed to the Senate of Canada representing senatorial division of Nova Scotia. A Conservative, he was Receiver General from 1 July 1867 to 16 November 1869 and President of the Privy Council from 1869 to 1870, when he was knighted. He resigned from the Senate on 11 April 1876.

He died in his home at 167 Pleasant Street, Halifax, on 16 May 1891.

Political offices
Preceded by None	Receiver General; 1867–1869	Succeeded by Jean-Charles Chapais
