= Stephen Binney =

1st Mayor of Halifax
- In office 1841–1842
- Succeeded by: Edward Kenny

Personal details
- Born: March 24, 1805; Halifax, Nova Scotia
- Died: January 17, 1872 (aged 66); Moncton, New Brunswick
- Spouse: Emily Pryor
- Parent: Hibbert Newton Binney (father)
- Profession: Merchant, shipbuilder

Stephen Binney (March 24, 1805 – January 17, 1872) was a merchant, shipbuilder and political figure in Nova Scotia. He was the first mayor of Halifax, serving from 1841 to 1842.

He was born in Halifax, the son of Hibbert Newton Binney, who was the son of Jonathan Binney, and Lucy Creighton. He married Emily Pryor in 1828. In 1841, after having been elected mayor, he clashed with Lieutenant-Governor Lord Falkland during the visit of a prince of the House of Orleans. Binney travelled to England in January 1842, authorized to deliver a congratulatory address on behalf of the city council on the birth of a son, later King Edward VII, to Queen Victoria. Edward Kenny was named as his replacement in March of the same year after Binney's leave of absence expired. During his visit to England, Binney's business interests in Halifax suffered financial problems. In 1843, Binney purchased land in Lewisville near Moncton which included a wharf and a shipyard and built his home there. He established himself as a wholesale merchant, dealing in lumber, flour, and feed. In 1850, Binney was among those supporting a route for the European and North American Railway, later the Intercolonial Railway which passed through Moncton.
