= Eastern Trust Company =

Former Canadian trust company

- Company type: Trust company
- Industry: Financial services
- Founded: 1893; 133 years ago in Halifax, Nova Scotia
- Defunct: 1963
- Fate: Merged with Chartered Trust
- Successor: Eastern and Chartered Trust

The Eastern Trust Company was a Canadian trust company incorporated in 1893 in Halifax, Nova Scotia.

== History ==
The Eastern Trust Company was proposed for incorporation on 13 December 1892 per an application by solicitors Henry, Harris & Henry in Halifax, Nova Scotia. The proposed company aimed to accept and execute trusts of various kinds, act as a receiver, trustee, assignee, executor, administrator, and guardian, and serve as an agent or attorney for business transactions. Its functions would include managing estates, collecting rents, interests, dividends, mortgages, and other securities, as well as conducting activities typical of trust companies.

Months later, the Eastern Trust Company was incorporated by an Act of the Nova Scotia Legislature, which was approved on 1 April 1893. The company was established following a petition by notable figures including Alfred Gilpin Jones, Thomas Fyshe, Wiley Smith, H. H. Fuller, James Crosskill Mackintosh, Thomas Edward Kenny, William Robertson, Adam Burns, Hugh McDonald Henry, Thomas Ritchie, John Doull, William Benjamin Ross, John Fitzwilliam Stairs, Patrick O'Mullin, Charles C. Blackadar, and Jeremiah F. Kenny, all from Halifax, as well as Robert Caie of Yarmouth and George A. Schofield of Saint John, New Brunswick. The Act granted the company powers to carry out trust and financial services.

John Fitzwilliam Stairs headed the syndicate that founded the company. He led Eastern Trust as president, with W.J. Stairs, his father, holding the largest share. The Union Bank of Halifax backed Eastern Trust's formation as a semi-industrial development bank. The institution was established with a capital of $200,000 and the following directors: T.E. Kenny, John Doull, Adam Burns, Thomas Ritchie, G.J. Troop, J.C. Mackintosh, T. Fysche, J.W. Allison, and others. With its head office established in Halifax, Nova Scotia, the company launched operations in Nova Scotia and New Brunswick upon its formation.

The Eastern Trust Co. received a first mortgage—a legal claim on assets—from the Halifax Electric Tramway Company in December 1895 to back the issuance of $600,000 in debentures. Halifax's entire street railway system was managed by the Halifax Electric Tramway Co.

On 7 May 1909, an act incorporating the company to conduct business in Quebec was approved, and the company chose Montreal as the location for its chief office.

The Eastern Trust Co. began operating as a bankruptcy trustee in Halifax on 18 August 1920. The Saint John's branch was officially appointed as a bankruptcy trustee on 24 March 1921. It functioned alongside other trust companies and individual trustees responsible for managing insolvency cases within the provinces.
