= Alexander Keith (politician) =

Canadian politician (1795–1873)

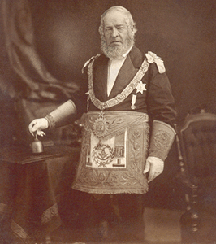

President of the Legislative Council of Nova Scotia
- In office 1867–1873

4th Mayor of Halifax
- In office 1852–1853
- Preceded by: Andrew MacKinlay
- Succeeded by: Henry Pryor
- In office 1843–1844
- Preceded by: Thomas Williamson
- Succeeded by: Hugh Bell

Personal details
- Born: October 5, 1795 Halkirk, Caithness, Highland, Scotland
- Died: December 14, 1873 (aged 78) Halifax, Nova Scotia, Canada
- Resting place: Camp Hill Cemetery; 44°38′33.9″N 63°35′10.2″W
- Party: Conservative
- Occupation: Brewer

Alexander Keith (5 October 1795 – 14 December 1873) was a Canadian businessman, politician, Freemason and founder of Alexander Keith's Brewery.

== Business ==
After learning the brewing trade from his uncle in Northern England, Keith emigrated to Halifax, Nova Scotia in 1817 and became manager at a brewery, which he bought out in 1820. In 1822, he moved the brewery to larger facilities and, in 1836, built a new brewery.

The end of slavery in the British and French Caribbean reduced the availability of sugar for rum-making, and other beverages grew in popularity. Beverages brewed by Keith included spruce beer, porter, ginger wine, and strong ale. The brewery is now part of Anheuser-Busch InBev.

From 1837, he served in senior management of various companies, including the Bank of Nova Scotia, the Halifax Fire Insurance Company, Colonial Life Assurance Company, the Halifax Gas, Light, and Water Company, the Provincial Permanent Building, and Investment Society.

== Political career ==
In 1841, he was elected to the city council of Halifax and was elected mayor in 1843, 1853, and 1854. In 1843, he was appointed to the Legislative Council of Nova Scotia, becoming its president from 1867 until his death in 1873.

Keith served with several fraternal and charitable societies, including as president of the North British Society and Grand Master of the Freemasons.

== Personal life ==
Born in Caithness, Scotland in 1795, Keith immigrated to Nova Scotia in 1817. He married Sarah Ann Stalcup in 1822, and they had three children, all of whom died before reaching adulthood. Sarah Ann Stalcup died in 1832, and a year later Keith married Eliza Keith, with whom he had eight children. Architect William Hay began construction of Keith's new residence, Keith Hall, in 1863. The palazzo mixes styles including baroque and a mansard roof. He died in Halifax in 1873 and is buried at Camp Hill Cemetery. His estate at death was evaluated at $251,000.

== Gallery ==
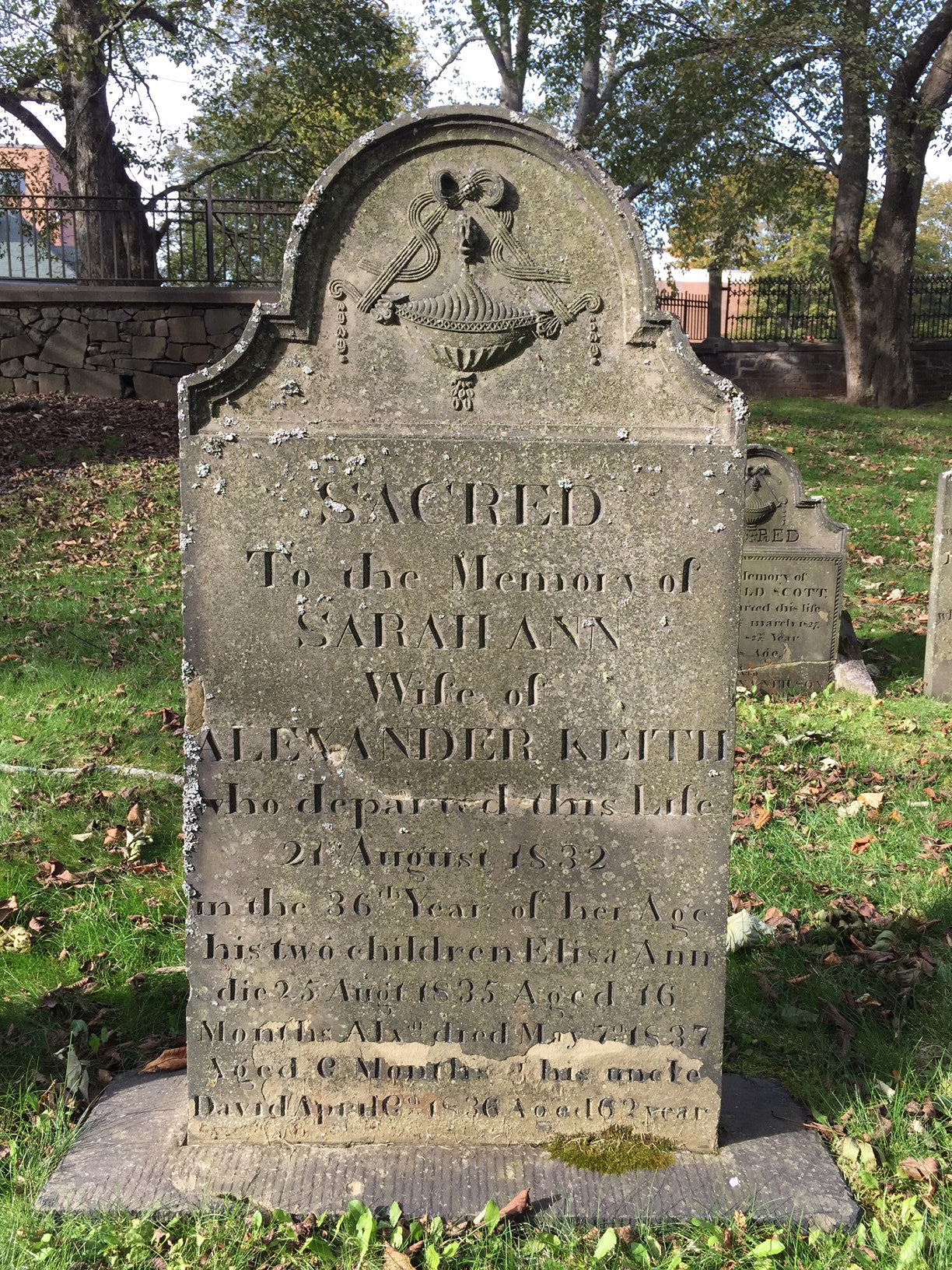
Sarah Ann Keith, Old Burying Ground

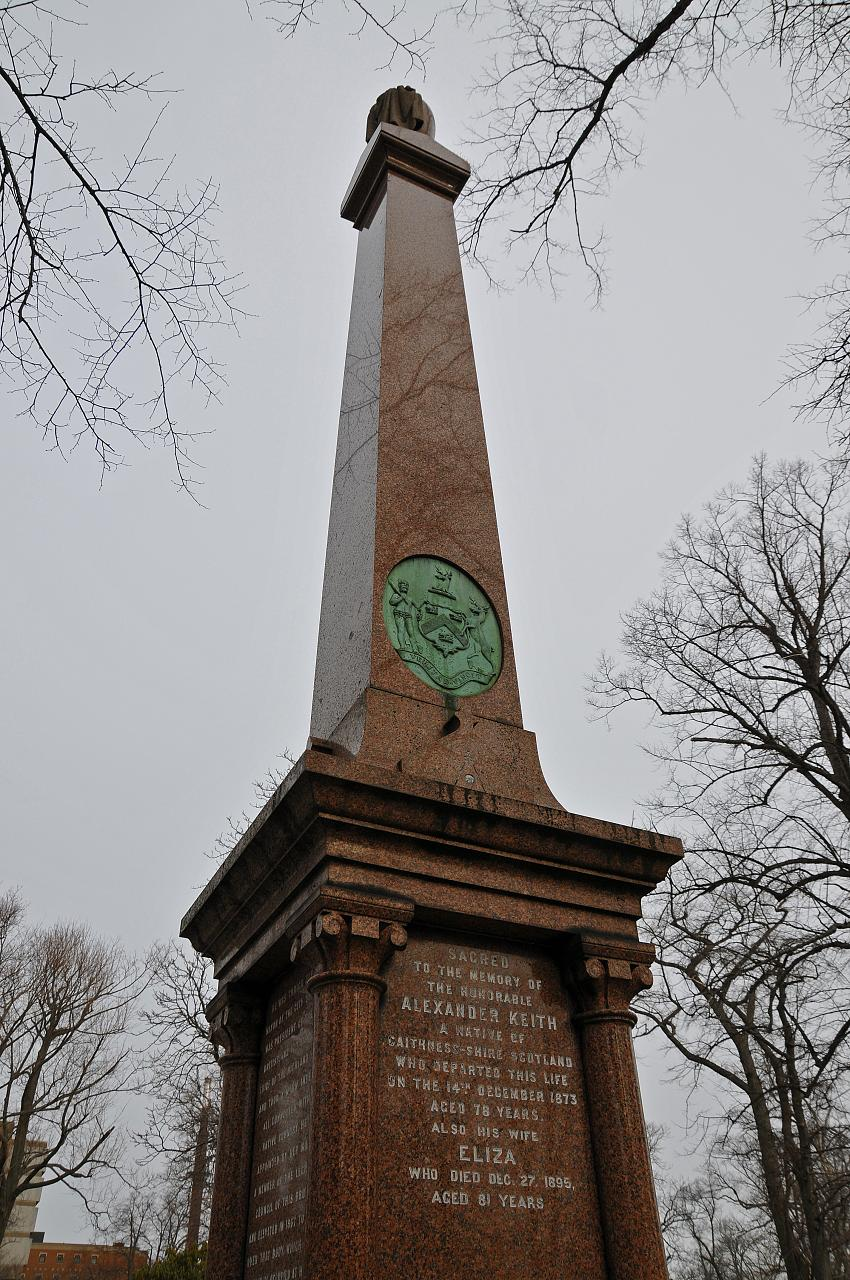
Alexander Keith, Camp Hill Cemetery

== See also ==
Alexander Keith Jr.: his nephew, who was a criminal and Confederate secret agent and used in 1875 a time bomb in an attempt to destroy the ship Mosel in Bremerhaven, Germany, to collect in an insurance fraud scheme.
