= John Archibald Sinclair =

Canadian politician

John A. Sinclair

24th Mayor of Halifax
- In office Oct 1873 – Oct 1875
- Preceded by: William Alexander Henry
- Succeeded by: James Duggan

Personal details
- Born: John Archibald Sinclair; 1822 Halifax, Nova Scotia, Canada
- Died: Unknown Halifax, Nova Scotia, Canada
- Parent: Archibald Sinclair (father)
- Profession: Merchant; Politician

John Archibald Sinclair (born 1822) was a Canadian politician in Nova Scotia who was elected the 24th Mayor of Halifax from 1873 to 1875.

== Early life ==
John Archibald Sinclair was born in Halifax, Nova Scotia, Canada, in 1822.

He was the son of Archibald Sinclair, who was elected president of the North British Society in 1835. His father had emigrated to Canada from Scotland.

He pursued his studies in the City of Halifax and was employed for many years by the firm of Alex McLeod & Co. In the 1840s, before Canadian Confederation, he was noted as a wine merchant.

== Political career ==
=== City Alderman ===
After the City of Halifax was incorporated in 1841, he served as a common councillor of Halifax's Ward 3 from 1842 to 1844.

He joined the North British Society in 1845 and subsequently served in multiple roles, including secretary in the early 1850s, senior assistant vice president in 1855, and vice president in 1860. He was elected president of the North British Society at its annual meeting in 1861.

From 1867 to 1869, he sat on the Halifax city council as Ward 1's alderman under Mayor Stephen Tobin. Sinclair soon sought the office of mayor but was defeated by William Dunbar in the Halifax civic elections on October 2, 1871.

=== Mayor of Halifax ===
He was elected the 24th mayor of Halifax in 1873 and was re-elected for the 1874 term. He succeeded James Duggan and, after a second term, was followed by Matthew Henry Richey.

During his tenure, he was vice-president of the Point Pleasant Park commission when the first lease agreement was signed by him and president William Young on December 31, 1873.
