= Joseph Andrew Chisholm =

Canadian politician and judge

The Honourable Sir Joseph Chisholm
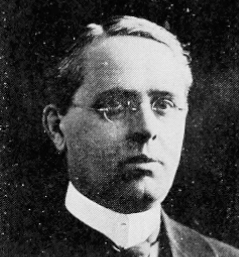

Chief Justice of the Nova Scotia Supreme Court
- In office 1931–1950

Justice of the Nova Scotia Supreme Court
- In office 1916–1931

Mayor of Halifax
- In office 1909–1912

Personal details
- Born: January 9, 1863 St. Andrews, Nova Scotia
- Died: January 22, 1950 (aged 87) Halifax, Nova Scotia
- Spouse: Frances Affleck (m. 1891; died 1903)
- Education: St. Francis Xavier University; Dalhousie University
- Occupation: Jurist, politician

Sir Joseph Andrew Chisholm (January 9, 1863 – January 22, 1950) was Mayor of Halifax and Chief Justice of the Supreme Court of Nova Scotia.

== Biography ==
Born in St. Andrews, Nova Scotia to William and Flora Chisholm, Chisholm was educated at St. Francis Xavier University before moving to Halifax in 1896.

He attended Dalhousie University, where he received his law degree and his first job was in a law firm headed by a man destined to be a future Canadian Prime Minister, Robert Borden.

Chisholm was elected as Mayor of Halifax from 1909 to 1912. In 1916, Borden appointed him to the Nova Scotia Supreme Court, being the first Dalhousie graduate to be so named. He was appointed chief justice in 1931.

Chisholm also wrote historical articles about past Nova Scotia justices and contributed to the Catholic Encyclopedia. In 1909, he edited a revised edition of The Speeches and Public Letters of Joseph Howe.

In 1935, he became the last Nova Scotia Supreme Court justice to be knighted.

Joseph Andrew Chisholm was married to Frances Affleck, sister of Annie Affleck, wife of Sir John S. Thompson, in 1891. She died in 1903.

Chisholm died on January 22, 1950, in Halifax.
