= Adam Hemmeon =

Adam Hemmeon (April 28, 1788 – July 9, 1867) was Mayor of the City of Halifax, Nova Scotia, from 1848 to 1849.

Before becoming Mayor, Hemmeon was one of the founders of the Halifax Water Company, Halifax Regional Water Commission which took the first steps toward a safe and reliable water supply for the Halifax region.
