= Grand Parade (Halifax, Nova Scotia) =

Civic space in Halifax, Canada

Coordinates: 44.6482°N 63.5750°W

- Public square
- {{{other_names}}}
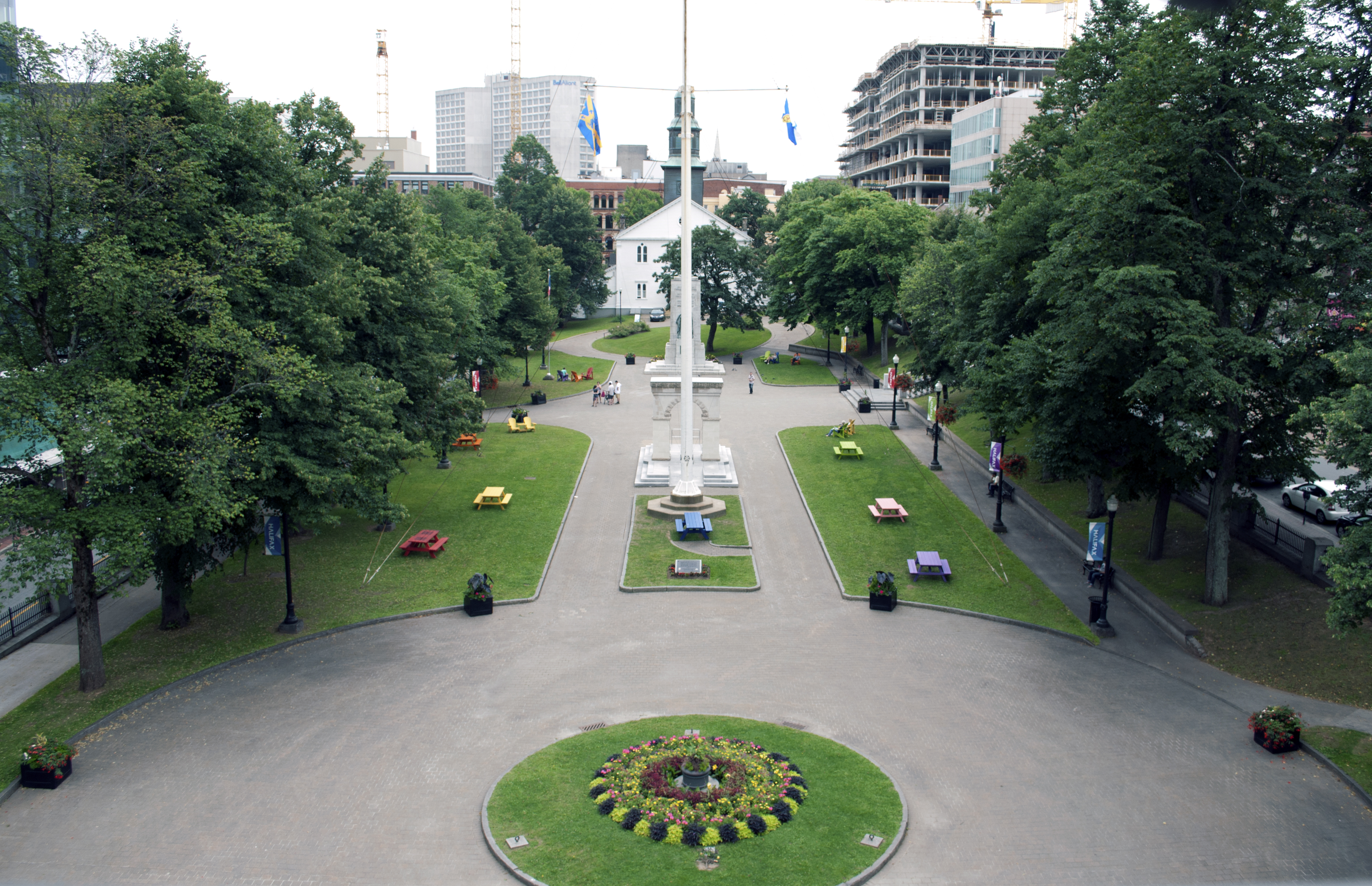
- Grand Parade viewed from City Hall
- Features: Cenotaph, flagpole
- Opened: 1749
- Area: 0.6 hectares (1.5 acres) (approx)
- Surface: Grass, brick
- Location: Halifax, Nova Scotia
- Interactive map of Grand Parade

The Grand Parade (sometimes incorrectly referred to as "Parade Square") is a historic military parade square dating from the founding of Halifax in 1749. At the north end of the Grand Parade, is the Halifax City Hall, the seat of municipal government in Nova Scotia's Halifax Regional Municipality. At the south end is St. Paul's Church. In the middle of Grand Parade is the cenotaph built originally to commemorate the soldiers who served in World War I.

Centrally located in Downtown Halifax, the square remains an important civic space used for numerous events including musical performances, political demonstrations, the annual New Year's Eve celebrations, Remembrance Day ceremonies, and Christmas tree lighting.

== History ==
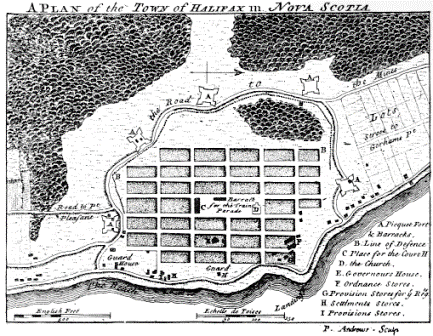
Halifax town plan with Grand Parade at centre

=== 18th century ===
The first contingent of British settlers in Halifax arrived in June 1749, and completed 300 houses by October 1749. Lieutenant John Brewse, a military engineer, sited the town within a defensive perimeter while Charles Morris, appointed Chief Surveyor on 25 September 1749, worked on the town layout and probably conducted the actual surveying. Moses Harris, a settler skilled in draughting, published the town plan for Halifax in 1749. It comprised an urban grid made up of oblong, rectangular city blocks with the Grand Parade at the centre of the town. The plan stipulated a church at one end of the square (opened 1750), and a courthouse and prison at the northern end. However, the north end remained vacant.

Shortly after arriving in Halifax, Governor Cornwallis ordered framing from Boston for the construction of a church. The cornerstone for the church was laid on 13 June 1750. It was named St. Paul's in 1759, when a parish of that name was established. The building was modeled off Marybone Chapel in London.

In 1794, Prince Edward arrived in Halifax to command the military in Nova Scotia and New Brunswick. He set about improving the military facilities around the city, and had the Grand Parade leveled to improve its usefulness. As Barrington Street slopes down toward the north of Grand Parade, a retaining wall was built here to keep the square level. The retaining wall is tall enough to accommodate inhabitable space underneath the square, with frontage on Barrington. This space originally accommodated ice houses for Mrs. Jane Donaldson, a Granville Street merchant.

=== 19th century ===
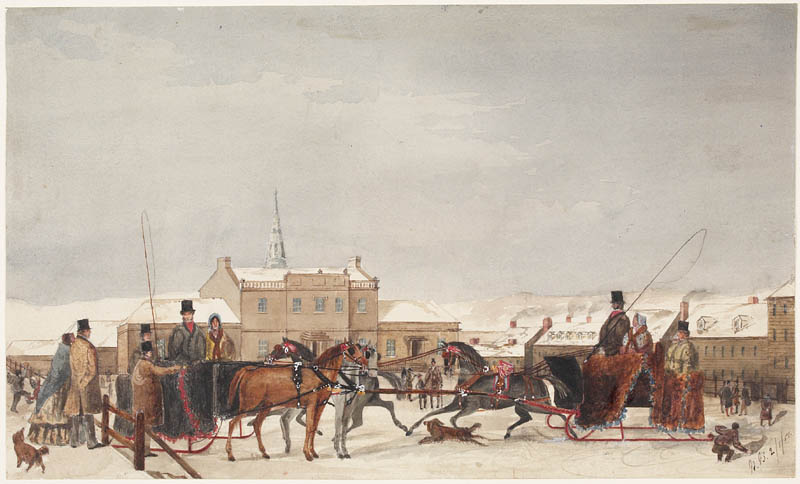
Dalhousie Square. A winter scene depicting men and women in their sleighs in front of Dalhousie College, Halifax, Nova Scotia, 1851.

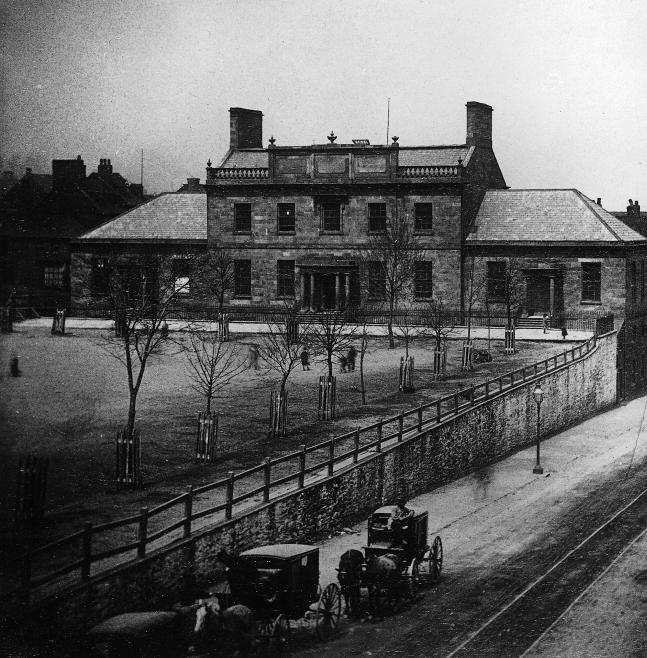
Dalhousie College in 1871, where City Hall now stands

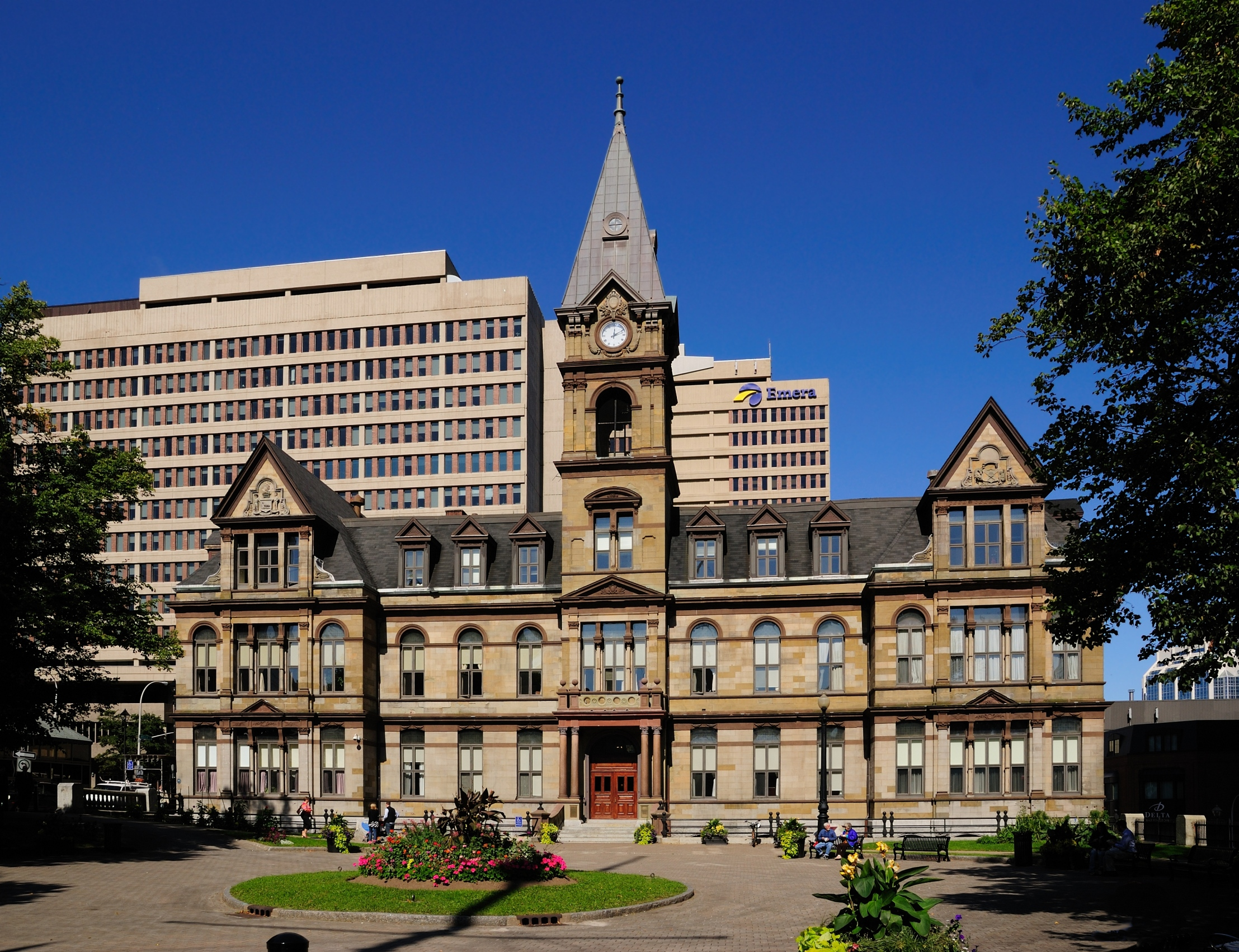
Halifax City Hall, opened 1890

The original building of Dalhousie College (now Dalhousie University) opened at the north end of the Grand Parade in 1821. It was a Georgian four storey building separated from the square by a dry moat to allow light to the lower floors. As the 19th century progressed the Grand Parade deteriorated. Dalhousie claimed to lack the funds to upkeep the space while the city claimed it could not take responsibility for the square without undisputed ownership of it. Meanwhile, city offices and council chambers were located at premises on Water Street described at the time as "a trifle porous", "disreputable looking", and "a dirty hole". In 1872, the council asked E.H. Keating, the city engineer, to investigate ways to improve the Grand Parade. Keating suggested building a new city hall at the south end of the site. Public opinion preferred the Dalhousie site, at the north end of the square. In the end, Dalhousie agreed to relocated to the city's South End and a decision was made to build a "respectable building" on the site of the college. At this time Mayor James MacIntosh suggested renaming the square after Queen Victoria as the name Grand Parade bore connotations to a "condition of decay". This was not pursued.

A new edifice was designed by Edward Elliot. Demolition of the old college began in 1886. The cornerstone of the new city hall was laid in 1888. Following the completion of the building, Keating completely redesigned the layout of the square to more suitably reflect its new civic role. He built a circular carriage drive that began at Barrington Street and looped in front of City Hall. The retaining wall on Barrington was rebuilt at this time.

=== 20th century ===
Keating's plan also specified a circular fountain that was not built until 1905. It was removed to make way for the Cenotaph, officially unveiled on July 1, 1929 by Sir Robert Borden. The Cenotaph, honouring Canada's war dead, was designed by Scottish sculptor J. Massey Rhind.

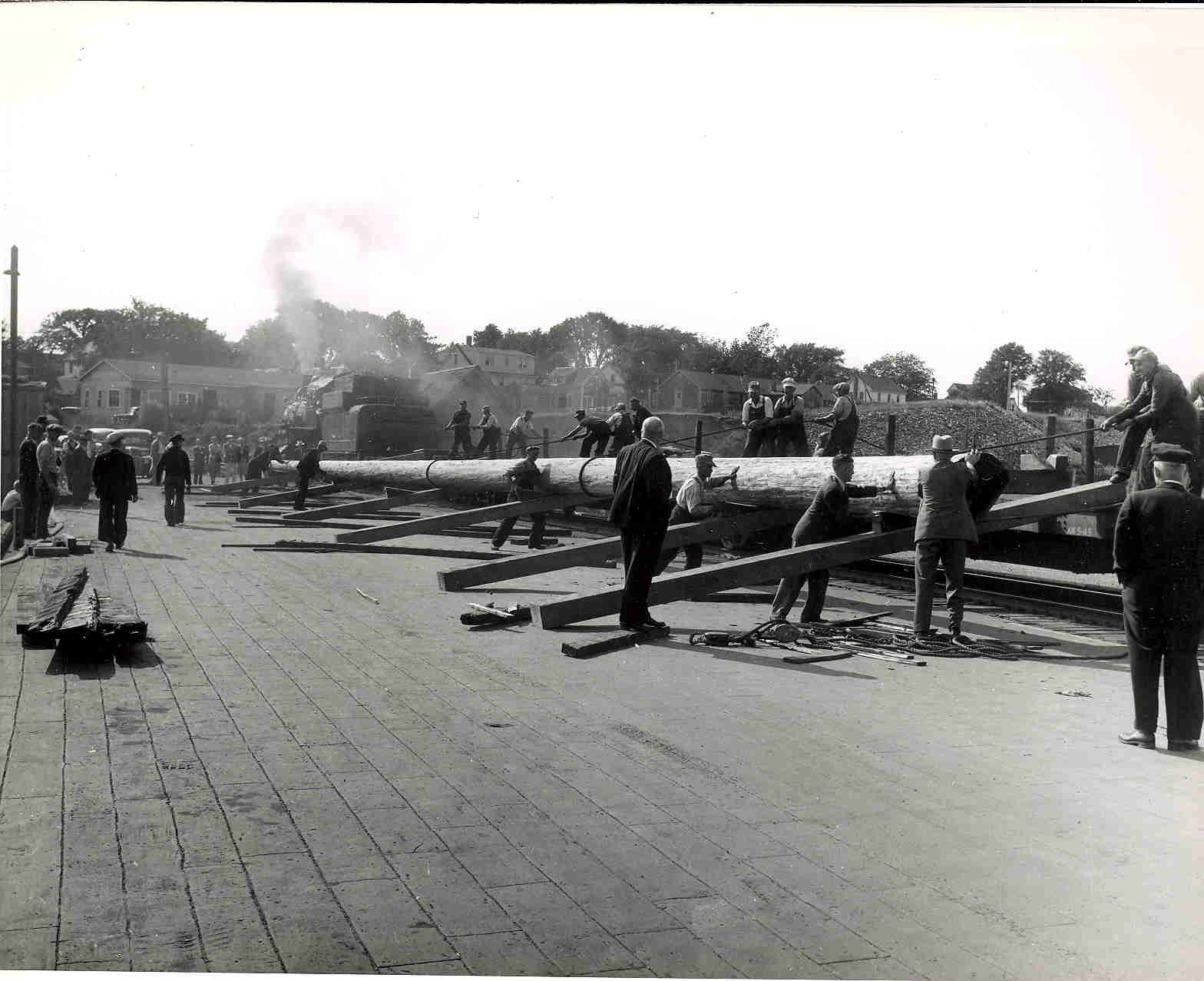
Grand Parade flagpole being transported through Digby in 1947

In 1907 the retaining wall on Barrington Street was augmented to include a stable. There were also plans to build public toilets south of the stable but these were not proceeded with. Later this undercroft space became a police patrol station that operated until 1952. This space is currently walled off and unused.

A new flagpole was installed in preparation for the city's bicentennial commemoration in 1949. The 128 feet (39 m) long Douglas fir log was transported from British Columbia by the Canadian Pacific Railway to the Bay of Fundy, where it was put aboard a scow and sailed to Digby. It was floated to shore and loaded onto three CPR flatcars, arriving in Halifax on August 4, 1947. The new flagpole was erected by the Royal Canadian Engineers and officially unveiled in September 1947 by Mayor A.E. Ahern and railway officials.

There was once a short street called St. Paul's Hill that ran directly in front of St. Paul's Church and connected Barrington and Argyle Streets. It was created at the behest of St. Paul's during the renovations to the square after Prince Edward's 1794 arrival. The civic address of the church was 1 St. Paul's Hill. The street was served by a bus in the 20th century. It was closed in 1977-1978 and the land incorporated into the Grand Parade.

The parade was improved in 1995 for the 21st G7 summit. Three functional areas were designated to accommodate different needs and uses: St. Paul's Plaza, the Civic Plaza in the centre, and the City Hall Plaza in front of City Hall. The pedestrian entrance to the City Hall Plaza from Argyle Street was added in 1999.

== Recent developments ==
For several decades, regional councillors were allowed to park their cars in the Grand Parade. This was controversial; a 1989 report stated that "a consensus of opinion indicates that all parking in the Grand Parade should be eliminated." The Coast argued for parking to be removed, derisively labeling the status quo as the "Grand Parkade". On May 20, 2003 councillors Sheila Fougere and Dawn Sloane brought forward a motion to seek alternative parking elsewhere so the space could be opened for public use, but this was defeated. On December 14, 2004 council voted against moving councillor parking to the Birk's lot. The matter came up again on January 18, 2005 on a motion to reconsider and the proposal was again voted down. Councillor Steve Streatch was one of the most steadfast opponents of moving car parking to the vacant Birk's site, across the street from city hall, because he favoured the convenience of not having to walk the short distance. Council eventually voted to relocate the councillor parking lot from September 1, 2007 (Streatch successfully argued to delay the deadline from the April 1 cutoff originally proposed).

On October 17, 2010, a concrete arch was unveiled as a memorial to peace officers killed in the line of duty. It is inscribed with the names of 21 fallen Nova Scotia peace officers.

== Events ==
The Grand Parade is home to a variety of events all year-round. Each November 11, the Cenotaph is home to the official Remembrance Day commemoration ceremony. There are celebrations on other holidays including Canada Day, and an annual concert and countdown on New Year's Eve. The municipality also allows community groups to hire the square for special events, although there are special rules governing the use of the Grand Parade, including restrictions on advertising and the clause that events must remain 20 feet away from the Cenotaph.

Visiting dignitaries and members of the royal family often tour the square and greet the public there. For example, the Queen visited the square on a 10-day tour of Canada in 1994, where she reviewed a guard of honour and laid a wreath at the cenotaph.

The Grand Parade is also a popular site for political demonstrations, and as a starting or ending point for protest marches.

=== Occupy Nova Scotia ===
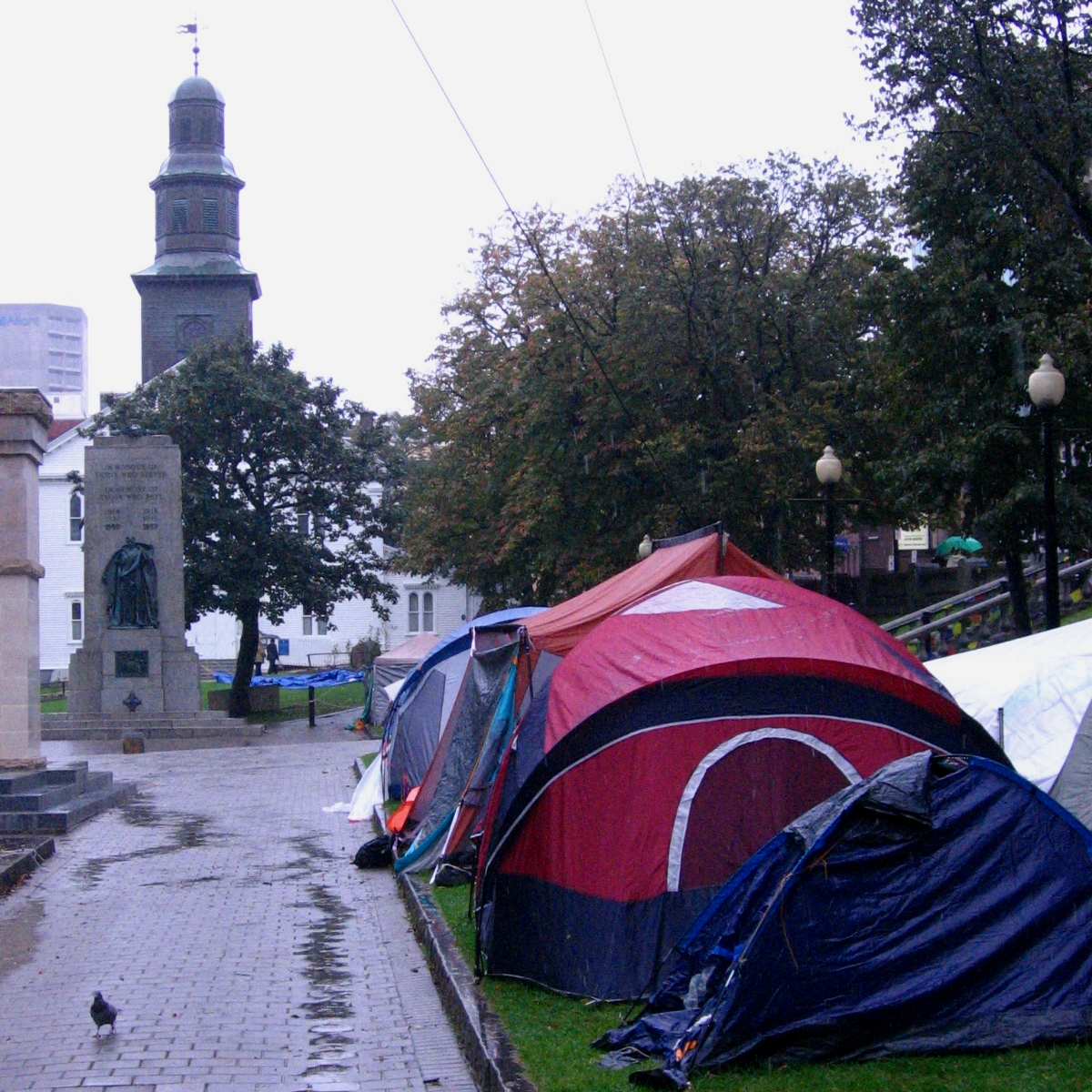
Occupy Nova Scotia camp at Halifax's Grand Parade

An Occupy Nova Scotia camp was established at the Grand Parade on October 15, 2011. An occupation by about 300 people began with about 25 tents including a medical tent, art supplies, a food and entertainment tent hosting discussion groups, art creation as well as a daily General Assembly. The first major activities were performance contributions to Halifax's Nocturne nighttime arts festival. The gathering grew to 30 tents by October 20, despite a heavy rain storm on October 19 that destroyed several tents and caused local flooding.

== Features ==
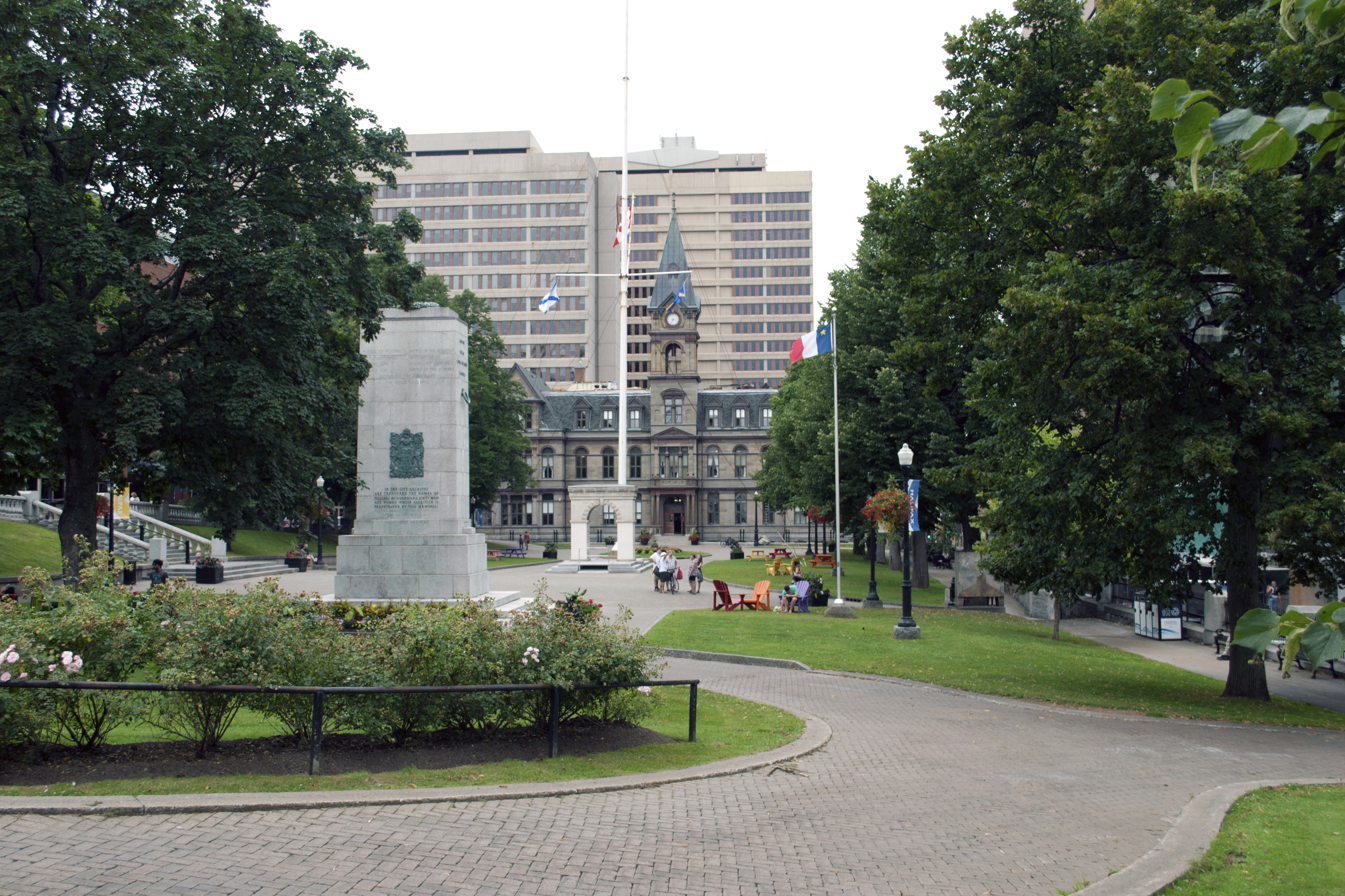
Grand Parade Halifax looking north, Cenotaph, mast, and Halifax City Hall pictured.

=== Halifax City Hall ===
The Halifax City Hall is located on the original site of Dalhousie University, built 1821. The university building was demolished to make way for the new structure and timbers from the old academic building were reportedly incorporated into the municipal building, the Halifax City Hall.

It was designed by architect Edward Elliot and constructed for the City of Halifax between 1887 and 1890; it is one of the oldest and largest public buildings in Nova Scotia and is a designated National Historic Site of Canada. The building is of cream and red sandstone, designed in an eclectic, monumental style. It features granite construction on the ground floor and in the tower. The seven storey tower has clock faces on the north and south sides. The northern face is fixed at four minutes past nine to commemorate the Halifax Explosion of 1917.

=== The Cenotaph ===
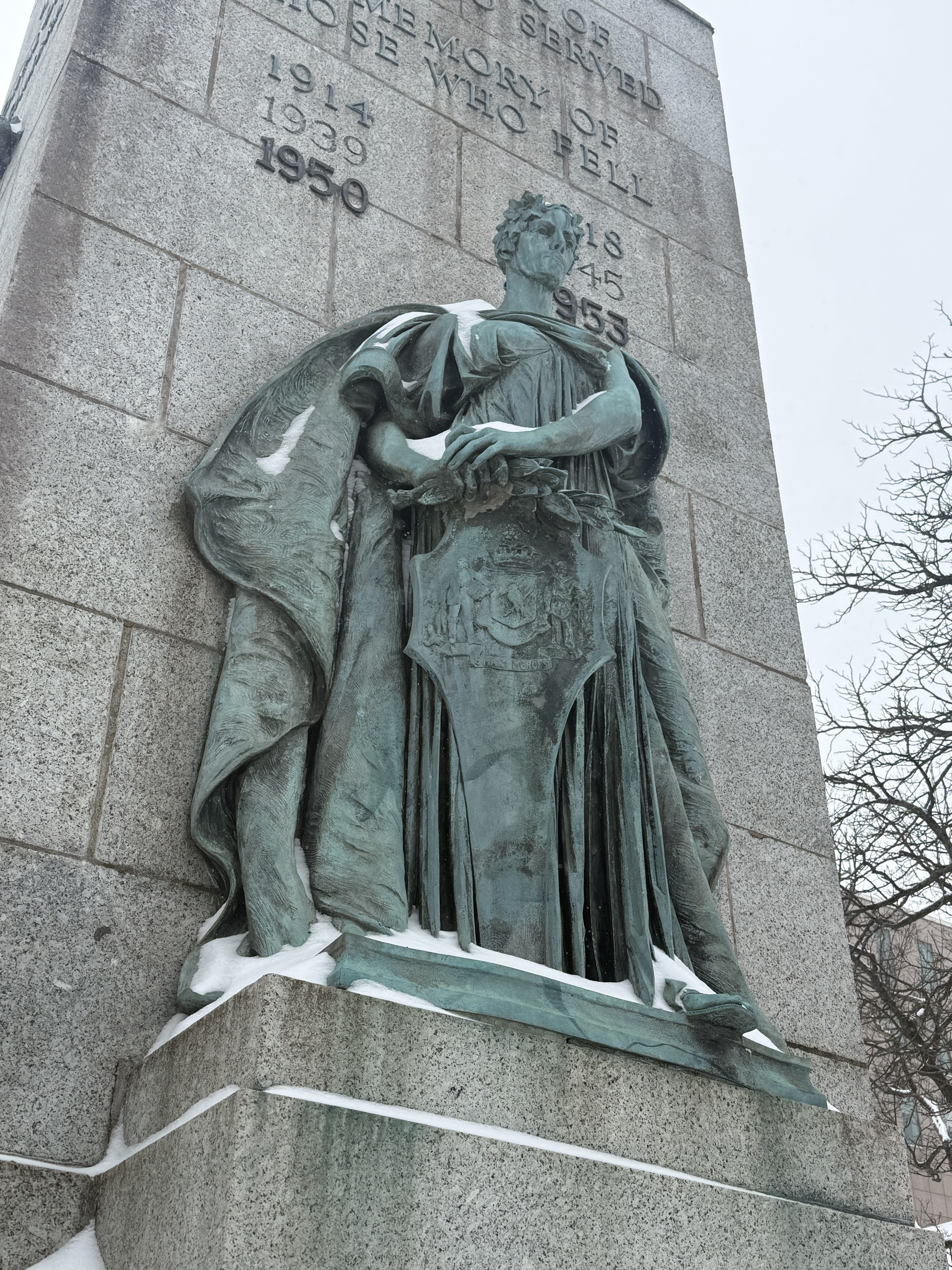
Britannia by renowned New York sculptor J. Massey Rhind, Cenotaph, Grand Parade, Halifax

The Cenotaph in the middle of Grand Parade was dedicated on Dominion Day (July 1) 1929 by Former Prime Minister Robert Borden to commemorate those who died in World War I. The Bronze work on the cenotaph was modelled after Edwin Lutyens' famous Cenotaph in Whitehall, England, with a statue of Britannia by noted Scottish sculpture John Massey Rhind. The Cenotaph is constructed of local Tangier granite.

The sculpture depicts victorious but grieving Britannia representing Nova Scotian motherhood. There are also three ceremonial wreaths, the names of First and Second World War Battles honours, a dedication, the coat of arms of both Nova Scotia and Canada as well as a Victory Cross.

During a 2009 maintenance inspection structural problems were discovered with the monument. It was completely dismantled and rebuilt in time for the Remembrance Day ceremony that year.

=== St. Paul's Church ===
St. Paul's Church is the first Protestant Church built in Canada and the oldest building in Halifax. Founded in 1749, the first service held on 2 September 1750. It is the oldest still-standing Anglican church in Canada. It is based on the ground plan of the Gibbs church of St. Peter's, Vere Street in London, with later additions such as a larger tower. For many decades it was one of the only places of worship in Halifax, and other denominations would thus hold services in the building.

During the Halifax Explosion of 1917, a piece of wooden window frame from another building was lodged into the wall of St. Paul's Church, where it remains today.

== See also ==
- History of the Halifax Regional Municipality
- History of Nova Scotia
- List of historic places in Halifax, Nova Scotia
