= Halifax Regional Fire and Emergency =

Fire and emergency service provider in Nova Scotia, Canada

Coordinates: 44.708°N 63.578°W

Halifax Regional Fire & Emergency
- (HRFE)

Operational area
- Country: Canada

Agency overview
- Established: 1754 (as Halifax Fire Service), 1996 (as Halifax Regional Fire & Emergency)
- Employees: 489 (2016)
- Staffing: Career & Volunteer
- Fire chief: Ken Stuebing
- EMS level: BLS First Responder
- IAFF: 268

Facilities and equipment
- Stations: 51
- Engines: 48
- Trucks: 38
- Quints: 7
- Squads: 10
- HAZMAT: 1

Website
- www.halifax.ca/fire-police/fire

Halifax Regional Fire and Emergency Services provides fire protection, rescue and first responder assistance throughout Halifax, Nova Scotia, Canada.

== History ==
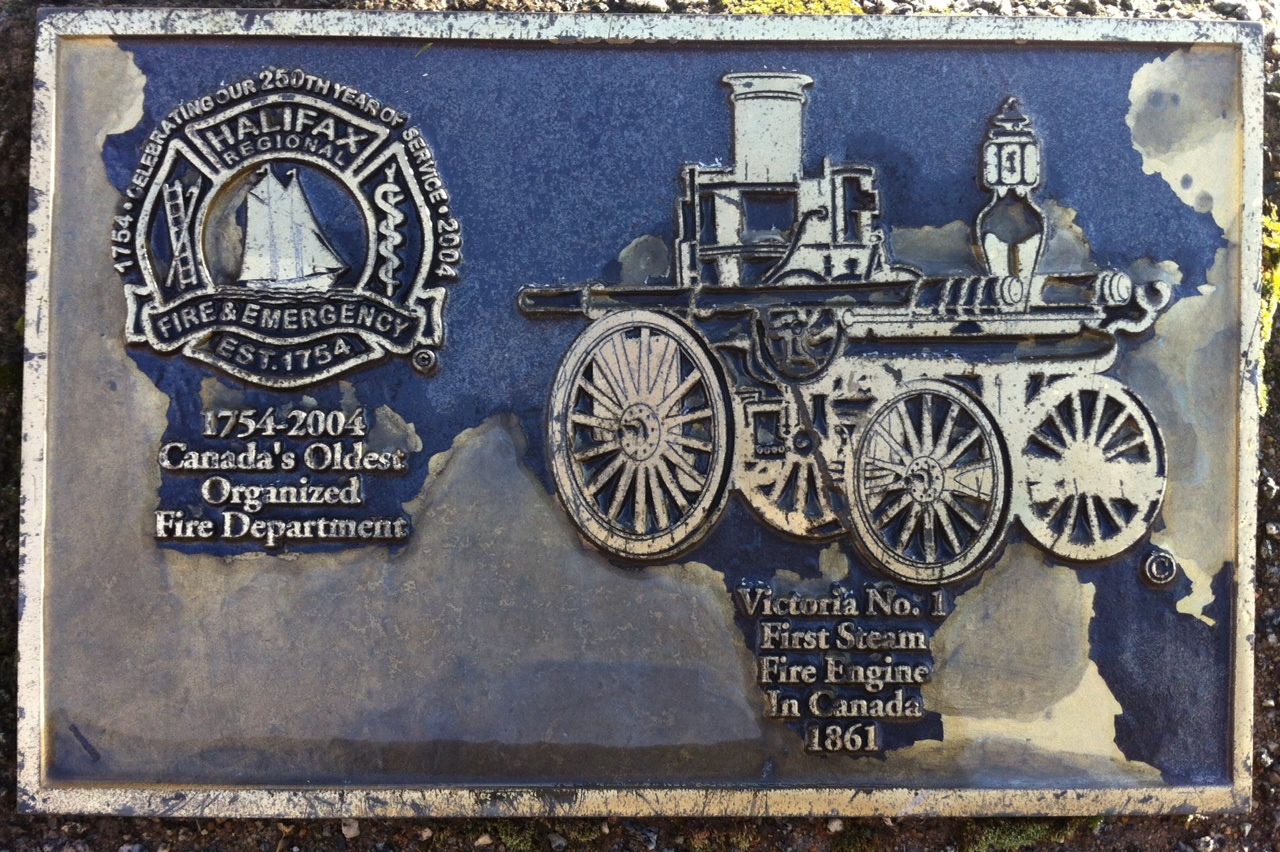
Halifax Fire Department - Plaque commemorating first Fire Department in Canada, Grand Parade (Halifax), Nova Scotia

Halifax originated as a British fortification in 1749, followed by Dartmouth in 1750 and Sackville in 1751. The Halifax Fire Service is the oldest fire department in Canada (1754). It was first known as the Union Fire Club and then became the Union Engine Company (1768). The Dartmouth Fire Department was eventually formed on the east side of the harbour in 1861.

Nine fire fighters were killed in the Halifax Explosion, the most ever at a single event in Canada.

In 1996, with the creation of the newly amalgamated Halifax Regional Municipality (HRM), the Fire Service was consolidated through a merger of the fire departments of the cities of Halifax and Dartmouth, the town of Bedford and the many volunteer departments located throughout Halifax County. At that time, there were 515 career fire fighters and 1,200 volunteer firefighters from a total of 38 fire departments would become part of the new organization. This extremely diverse entity was brought together under Fire Chief Gary Greene and Deputy Chiefs Michael Eddy and William Mosher.

The department is currently led by Fire Chief Ken Stuebing, Deputies Peter Andrews, Dave Meldrum, Roy Hollett and Corey Beals.

In 2011, a museum to commemorate the history of fire fighting in Nova Scotia, with special attention to the Halifax region was opened in Fall River, Nova Scotia named the Regional Firefighters Interpretation Centre. Their website is www.rficns.com There is a provincial firefighter museum in Yarmouth. Since 2012, there is an Annual Firefighter Memorial Service on June 2.

The Fallen Firefighters monument is located at Station 4, 5830 Duffus Street, Halifax.

== Operations ==
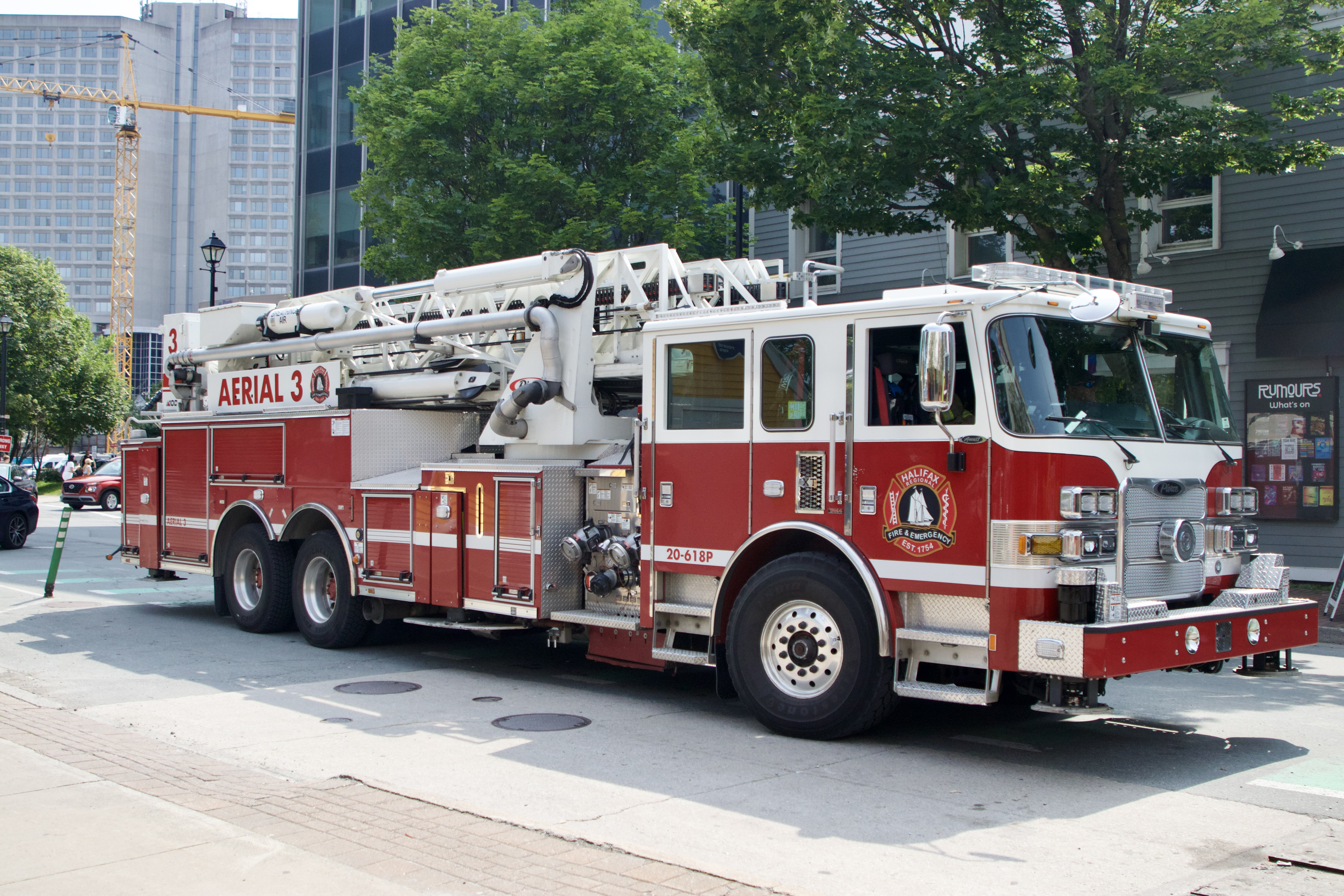
Aerial ladder truck on duty downtown

The composite (career & volunteer firefighters) fire service consists of 51 stations, 530 career firefighters, 547 volunteer firefighters and 66 support and civilian employees.

Halifax Regional Fire & Emergency (HRFE) is guided by HRM Council's Emergency Response Time Targets outlined in two (2) primary categories:

- "Urban" - Serving HRM's urban areas with a population of 100 ppl/sq km or greater.
- "Rural" - Serving HRM's large rural areas in the eastern and western parts of Halifax County, this area is primarily volunteer, supported by composite staffing either on a day time or twenty four hour station staffing model.

HRFE has: - 9 x twenty-four hour a day career staffed stations - 12 x twenty-four hour a day composite staffed stations - 8 x day time composite staffed stations and - 22 fully volunteer stations.

Communities and neighbourhoods are covered by this division in Halifax, Dartmouth, Bedford, Eastern Passage, Westphal, Cole Harbour and Lower Sackville.

In addition to regular urban and rural firefighting services, HRFE also provides Technical Rescue, Water and Ice Rescue, Hazardous Materials, and Medical First Responder services. Under the Federal USAR Task Force program, HRFE had been designated as CAN TF-5, one of 5 HUSAR teams from across Canada. HRFE is also equipped and trained for CBRN response.

== Statistics ==
- 530 career firefighters
- Approx. 547 volunteer firefighters
- Approx. 33,637 emergency calls in 2023
- 51 stations + 1 in construction

=== Apparatus ===
- 41 Engines
- 37 Tankers
- 21 Light Rescues
- 5 Quints
- 2 Aerials
- 6 Tactical Support units
- 1 Heavy Rescue
- 1 HazMat Decon unit
- 7 Brush trucks
- 1 Command unit
- 1 Rehab unit
- 1 Harbour Rescue Boat
- 8 Lake Rescue Boats
- Various Utility trucks and support vehicles

== Station closures ==
In 2013 Halifax Regional Fire & Emergency Services approved the closure of Fire Stations 32 (Mooseland), 37 (Elderbank), 53 (Terrence Bay), 61 (Ketch Harbor) and 51 (Upper Hammonds Plains). These stations were Sub Stations of other Fire Stations in the area. As well, Station 62 (Harrietsfield) suffered a fire in Jan 2015 that closed the station permanently. These areas are still protected fully by HRM Fire.

A new Station 62 was constructed in Williamswood to replace Stations 62 and 63, and opened in November 2020. As well the previous plans to relocate Station 8 (Bedford) and Station 9 (Lower Sackville) was halted and a new station is being contracted in West Bedford and is planned to open in 2025.
