= Edward Elliot (architect) =

Canadian architect (1828–1901)

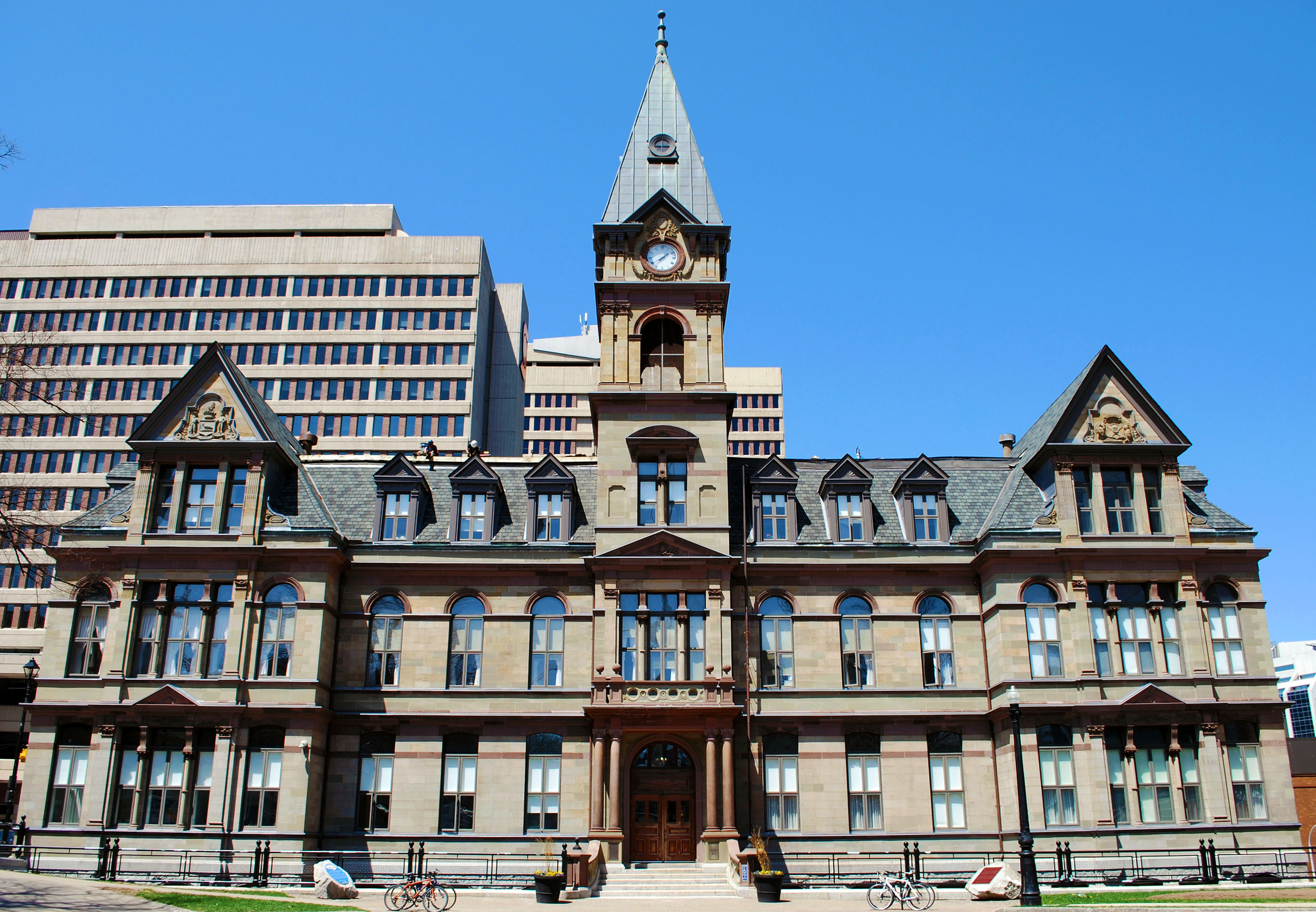
- Halifax City Hall, 2015
- Born: 1828; Dartmouth, Nova Scotia, Canada
- Died: 1901 (aged 72–73); Halifax, Nova Scotia, Canada
- Occupation: Architect
- Buildings: Halifax City Hall, Truro Agricultural College, Nova Scotia House of Assembly

Edward Elliot (1828–1901) was a Canadian architect who was responsible for many important public buildings in Nova Scotia, including the Church of the Redeemer (Universalist) in Halifax and the Truro Agricultural College.

== Life and career ==
Born in Dartmouth, Nova Scotia, Edward Elliot was one of ten children of Jonathan and Charlotte Elliot. Jonathan Elliot was a building contractor and two of his sons, Edward and Henry, became architects, their father helping build at least one of their buildings, the Mechanics Institute, in 1843 in Dartmouth. By 1878, they worked together as Elliot Brothers. Two of their early projects were the Presbyterian Theological Hall and the conversion of the Mechanics Institute building to become the Dartmouth Town Hall.

By 1880, Edward Elliot was working as an independent and his work in that capacity included the redesign of the Assembly Room in Province House as well as the design of Halifax City Hall in 1890.

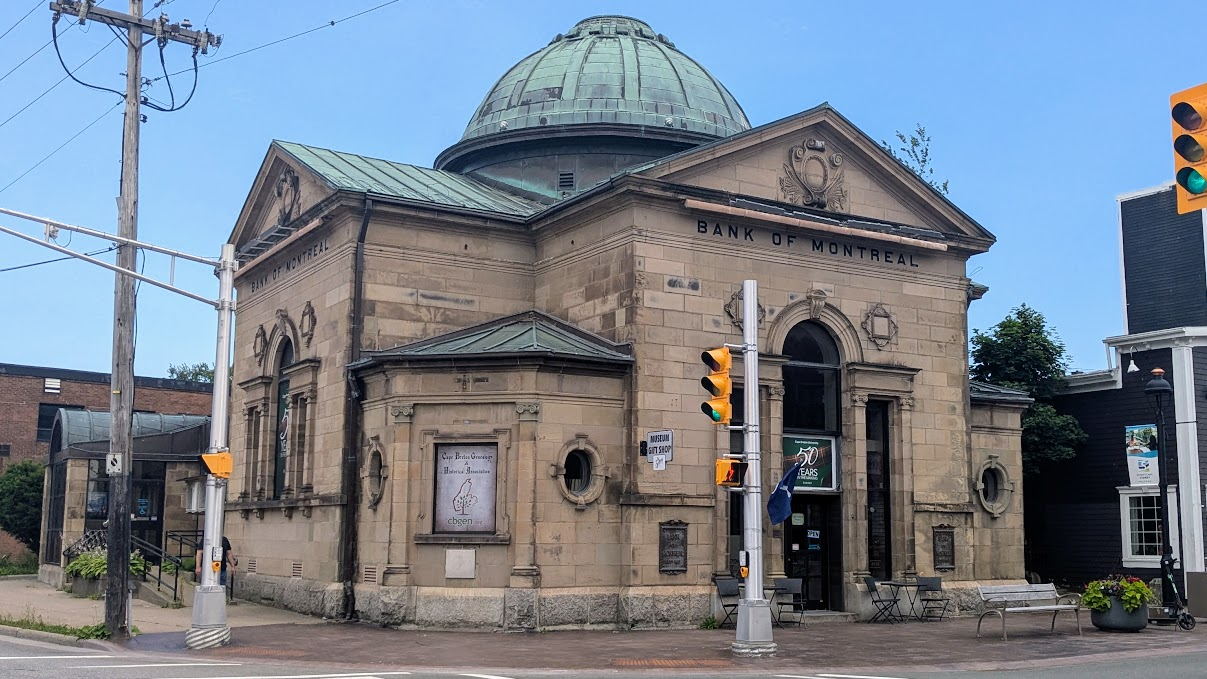
Former Bank of Montreal in Sydney, Nova Scotia, now a museum.

In 1895, Elliot founded the firm of Elliot & Hopson with the English-born Charles H. Hopson (1861–1941) as his junior partner. The firm was prolific, designing among other works the Point Pleasant Park gates, and the Nova Scotia Furniture Building on Barrington Street. The firm opened an office in Sydney, Nova Scotia in 1900, and was responsible for the design of the Presbyterian Church in North Sydney, the curate of Saint George's Anglican Church, and the Renaissance-style Bank of Montreal building on the corner of Dorchester and Charlotte Streets. After Eliot's death, the firm became known as Hopson Brothers.
