= George Campbell (cricketer, born 1893) =

South African cricketer

Personal information
- Full name: George Gordon Campbell
- Born: 12 September 1893; Durban, Natal, South Africa
- Died: 5 May 1977 (aged 83); Durban, Natal, South Africa
- Batting: Unknown

Domestic team information
- Years: Team
- 1921: Scotland

Career statistics
Competition	First-class
Matches	1
Runs scored	9
Batting average	4.50
100s/50s	–/–
Top score	6
Catches/stumpings	–/–
- Source: Cricinfo, 27 October 2022

George Gordon Campbell (12 September 1893 — 5 May 1977) was a South African first-class cricketer, British Army officer, and physician.

Campbell was born at Durban in September 1893. He was educated at Maritzburg College, before matriculating in 1912 to the University of Edinburgh in Scotland, where he studied medicine. His medical studies were interrupted by the First World War, with Campbell serving in the war and being commissioned as a second lieutenant with the Royal Field Artillery in 1914. He saw action during the war in the Senussi campaign, followed by the Gallipoli campaign, during the course of which he was wounded in action in the latter campaign. After recovering from his wounds, he saw action in the East African campaign from 1916 to 1918. In August 1916, he was appointed a temporary lieutenant.

Campbell resumed his medical studies following the end of the war. He played club cricket for Edinburgh University and was selected to play for the Scottish cricket team in a first-class match against Ireland at Dublin in 1921. Batting twice in the match, he was run out in the Scottish first innings for 3 runs, while in their second innings he was dismissed for 6 runs by William Harrington. Campbell later returned to South Africa, where he wrote a number of medical publications. He died at Durban in May 1977.
