= George S. Campbell =

Scottish-Canadian banker (1851–1927)

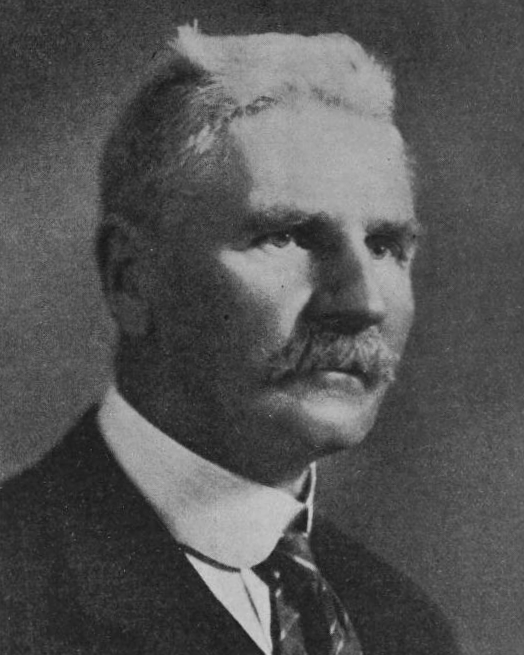
- Born: 8 July 1851; Edinburgh, Scotland
- Died: 21 November 1927 (aged 76); Montreal, Quebec
- Spouse: Helen Kennedy (m. 1887)

George Stewart Campbell (8 July 1851 – 21 November 1927) was a Scottish-Canadian banker who served from 1923 to 1927 as president of the Bank of Nova Scotia.
