= Halifax City Hall =

Historic building in Nova Scotia, Canada

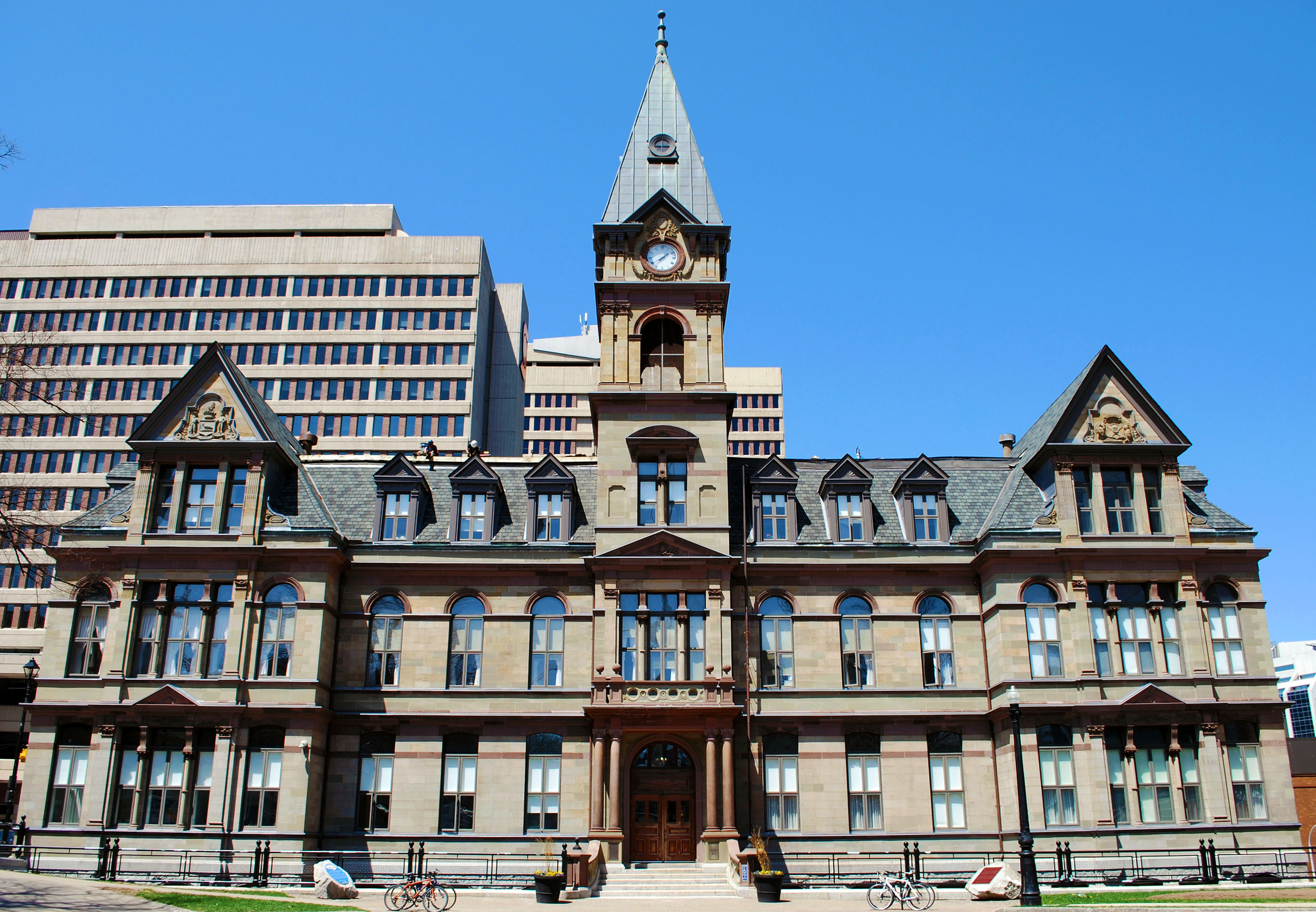
- Halifax City Hall, as seen from Grand Parade.
- Interactive map of the Halifax City Hall area

General information
- Status: Completed
- Architectural style: Late-Victorian Eclectic (Second Empire-influenced)
- Location: 1841 Argyle Street; Halifax, Nova Scotia; B3J 3A5
- Coordinates: 44°38′55″N 63°34′31″W
- Construction started: 1887
- Opened: May 22, 1890
- Owner: Halifax Regional Municipality

Technical details
- Floor count: 4
- Lifts/elevators: 1

Design and construction
- Architect: Edward Elliot
- Main contractor: Rhodes, Curry & Co.

Website
- www.halifax.ca/city-hall

National Historic Site of Canada
- Official name: Halifax City Hall National Historic Site of Canada
- Designated: 1984/11/23

Nova Scotia Heritage Property Act
- Type: Municipally Registered Property
- Designated: 1981/10/06
- Reference no.: 23MNS0448

Halifax City Hall is the home of municipal government in Halifax, Nova Scotia, Canada. Designed by architect Edward Elliot, and constructed for the City of Halifax between 1887 and 1890, it is one of the oldest and largest public buildings in Nova Scotia. The property was designated a National Historic Site of Canada in 1997.

Halifax City Hall was opened for municipal business, and for public access, in 1890 replacing offices in the old court house on the Halifax waterfront. City Hall was chosen to become the seat of the newly created Halifax Regional Municipality in 1996 and is now the base for the Halifax Regional Council.

== History ==
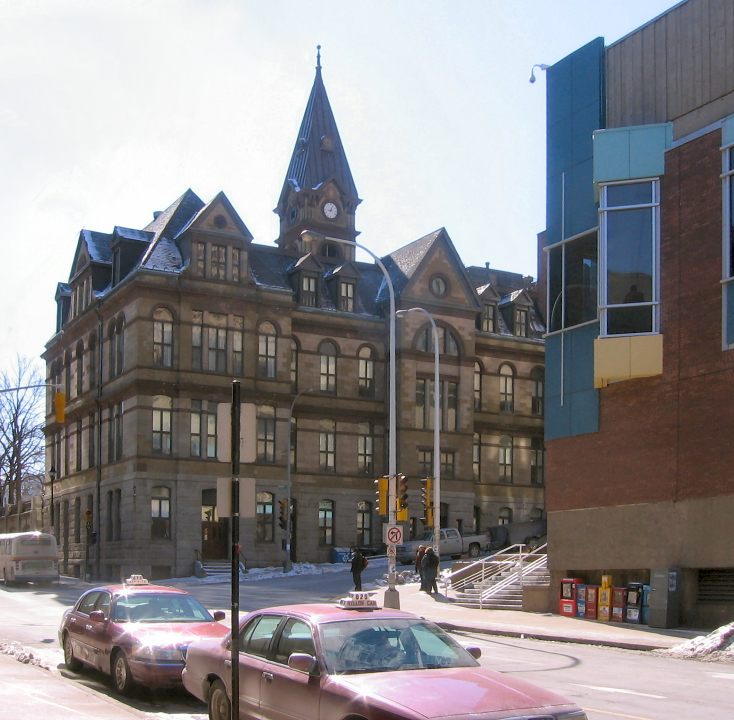
Halifax City Hall seen from Barrington Street.

The building fronts Duke Street and is located at the north end of Grand Parade, an historic military parade square dating from the founding of Halifax in 1749.

Dalhousie University was situated on the present-day site of the building during the nineteenth century; for many years, the town and later city council argued for the public use of the site. A compromise was engineered by the premier, Sir William Young to facilitate a new use for the site. The provincial government provided funding for the university to relocate its facilities and the City of Halifax granted the university a 5-acre (20,000 m^{2}) parcel of land elsewhere in the city to permit the university to expand. The university building was demolished to make way for the new structure and timbers from the old academic building were reportedly incorporated into the municipal building.

=== Design ===
Designed by Edward Elliot and constructed for the City of Halifax between 1887 and 1890; it is one of the oldest and largest public buildings in Nova Scotia and is a designated National Historic Site of Canada. In 1981, it was also listed as a Municipally Registered Property under Nova Scotia's Heritage Property Act.

Designed in an eclectic, monumental style, the building is of cream and red sandstone, laid in the freestone technique. It also features granite construction on the ground floor and in the tower. The seven-storey tower has clock faces on the north and south sides. The northern face (visible in the photograph above left), is fixed at four minutes past nine to commemorate the Halifax Explosion of 1917.

=== The early years: 1890 to 1900 ===
City Hall had five primary entrances in 1890. The grand entrance off of Grand Parade was the main public entrance and brought visitors onto the second floor. There were also entrances off of Argyle Street to the second floor, as well as three entrances to the first floor. One door allowed access to the building from the dry moat between the building and Grand Parade. Two doors facing Duke Street provided access to the police station that was located in the first floor until the late 1940s.

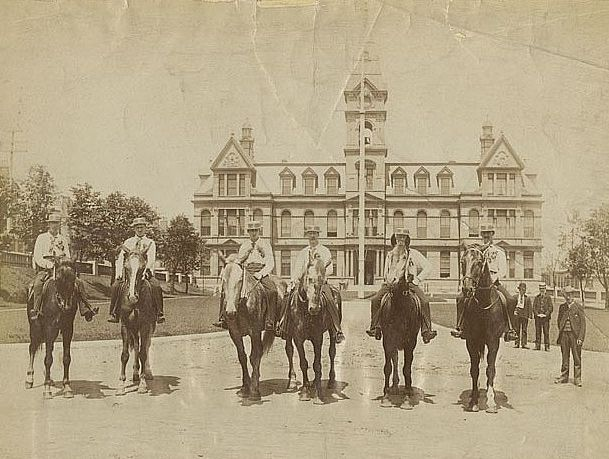
Horsemen on the Grand Parade, 1896.

The first floor originally contained the police court, policemen's rooms, office of Chief of Police, and jail cells. It was from these jail cells that Harry Houdini escaped in 1896, just six years after City Hall opened.

The main or second floor contained the auditor's office, the Board of Works, the City Clerk, the office of the Mayor, the Collector, the City Engineer, and the Treasurer. The third floor was home to the Council Chamber and the Citizens Free Library, as well as the offices of the Inspector of Licenses, the Collector of Rents and Licenses, the Foreman of Streets, and the Foreman of Water Works.

The fourth floor held a caretaker's apartment, and a space variously described as a ball room, a gallery, and a museum, though the space may simply not have been completed when the building was opened.

=== 1900 to 1996 ===
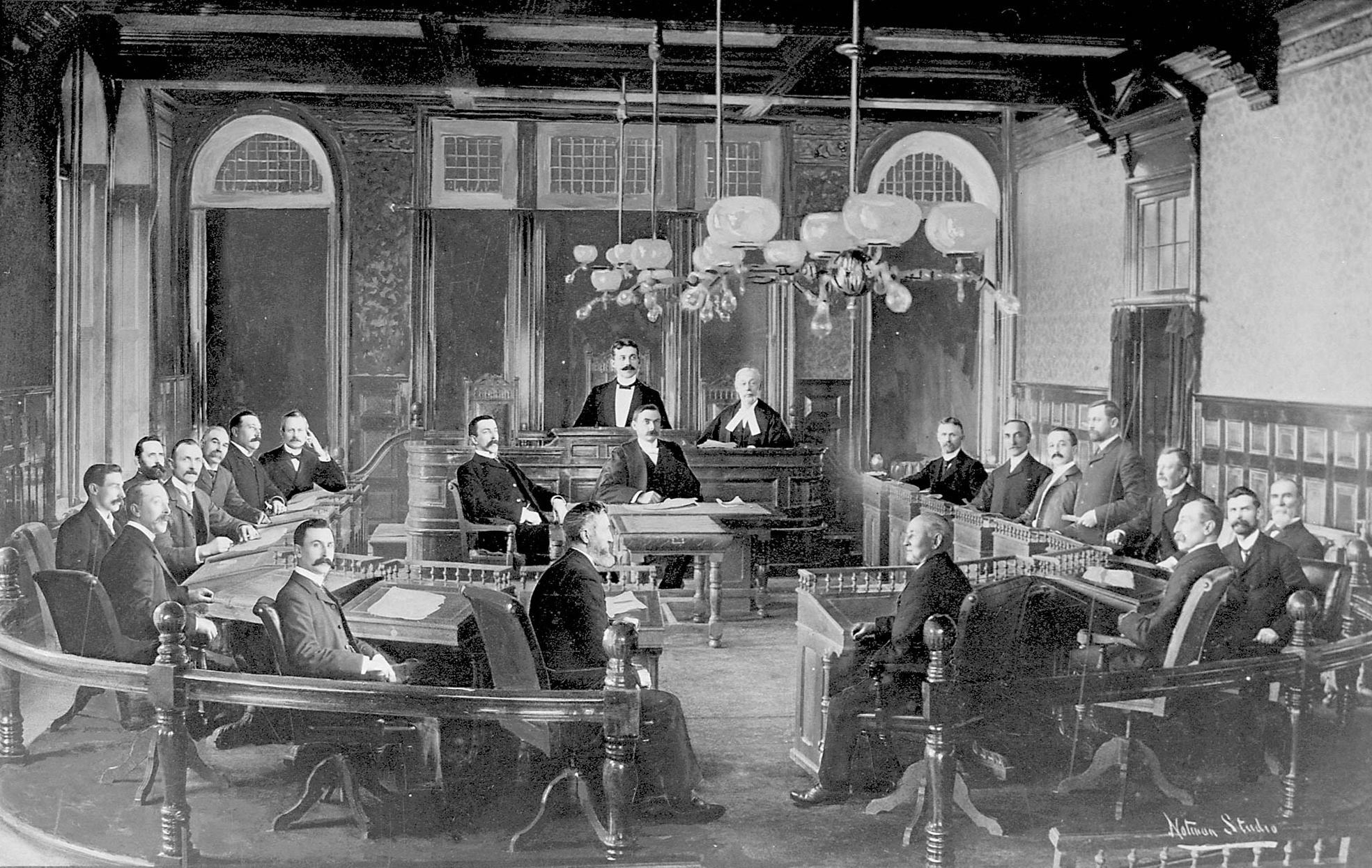
City Council and Department Heads, 1903. Composite photo by Notman Studio.

In 1907 stables were constructed under the north-east corner of the Grand Parade, at Barrington Street next to the dry moat. This involved the installation of one regular size door and a larger door for horses and carts in the two northernmost granite arched bays, opening onto Barrington Street.

After the Halifax Explosion, Deputy Mayor Colwell, five aldermen, and twelve citizens, including Lieutenant-Governor MacCallum Grant and Justice Harris, assembled in the City Collector's Office, which was the only room still serviceable after the explosion. An emergency joint meeting of the Members of the City Council present and Citizens in attendance was chaired by the Lieutenant-Governor, and would continue to meet there from December 1917 to late February 1918.

On May 25, 1918 a riot broke out in downtown Halifax following the arrest of an unruly and drunken sailor. Besides a besieged City Hall, the damage included a couple of turned over cars, and a police wagon and police motorcycle being thrown in the harbour.

The Citizens' Free Library was moved from place to place in the city for many years until 1890 when it was given a permanent home on the second floor of the then new City Hall. The Library closed in 1949 reopening as a part of the new Halifax Memorial Library on Spring Garden Road at Grafton Street in 1950, though the collection moved in 2014 to Halifax Central Library. The space formerly occupied by the library is now split between the office of the Mayor and the CAO.

The Halifax Police moved into the Market Building on Brunswick Street in 1953 from its cramped quarters in City Hall. The police department remained on Brunswick Street until moving to their current location in the David R. McKinnon Building on Gottingen Street in the 1970s.

A citizen committee was convened to lead a substantial renovation of the building in the 1980s. Halifax Hall, a large public meeting room, was created out of a number of offices in the east wing of the second floor. A damaging coating was applied to the sandstone in the 1990s. Repairs were successfully completed in 2013.

=== 1996 to present ===
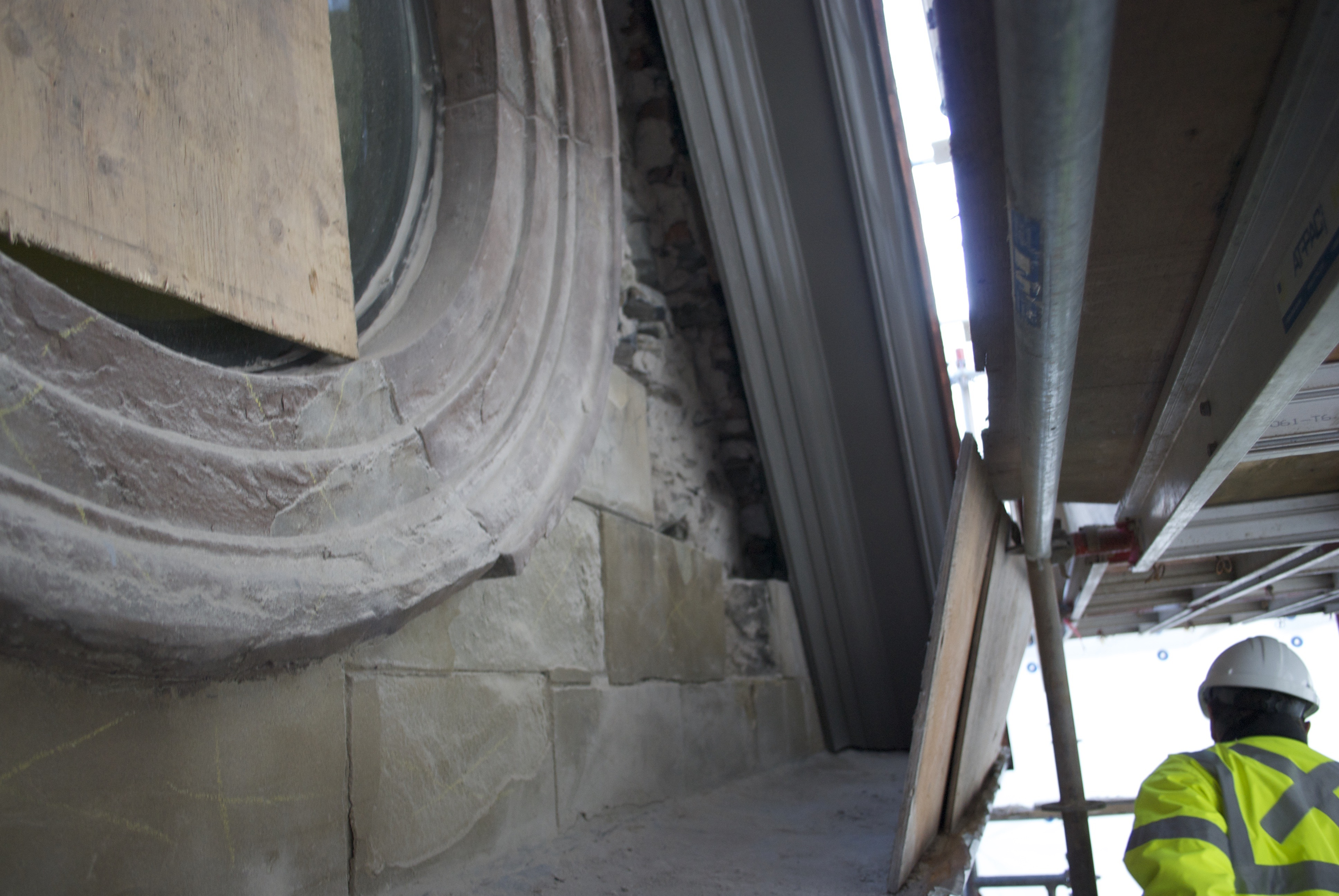
Close up of stonework restoration, January 2013

City Hall was chosen to become the seat of the newly created Halifax Regional Municipality in 1996 and became home to Halifax Regional Council as well as various municipal offices. During the late 1990s, Halifax Regional Council attempted to have the building renamed from Halifax City Hall to Halifax Regional Hall, to reflect the fact that Nova Scotia no longer has any "cities". This proposal was promptly rejected after a public outcry among heritage advocates.

In 2011 a major multi-year restoration of the building began. The original cornerstone of the building and several other stone facade features were painstakingly restored, while up to 80% of the exterior stone was replaced with new sandstone. The roof was replaced, heating and cooling systems upgraded and the 110-year-old elevator shaft decommissioned and replaced with a new, full size elevator. Interior upgrades were undertaken to bring the public and office spaces up to modern standards while respecting and maintaining character defining heritage elements.

== Current use ==
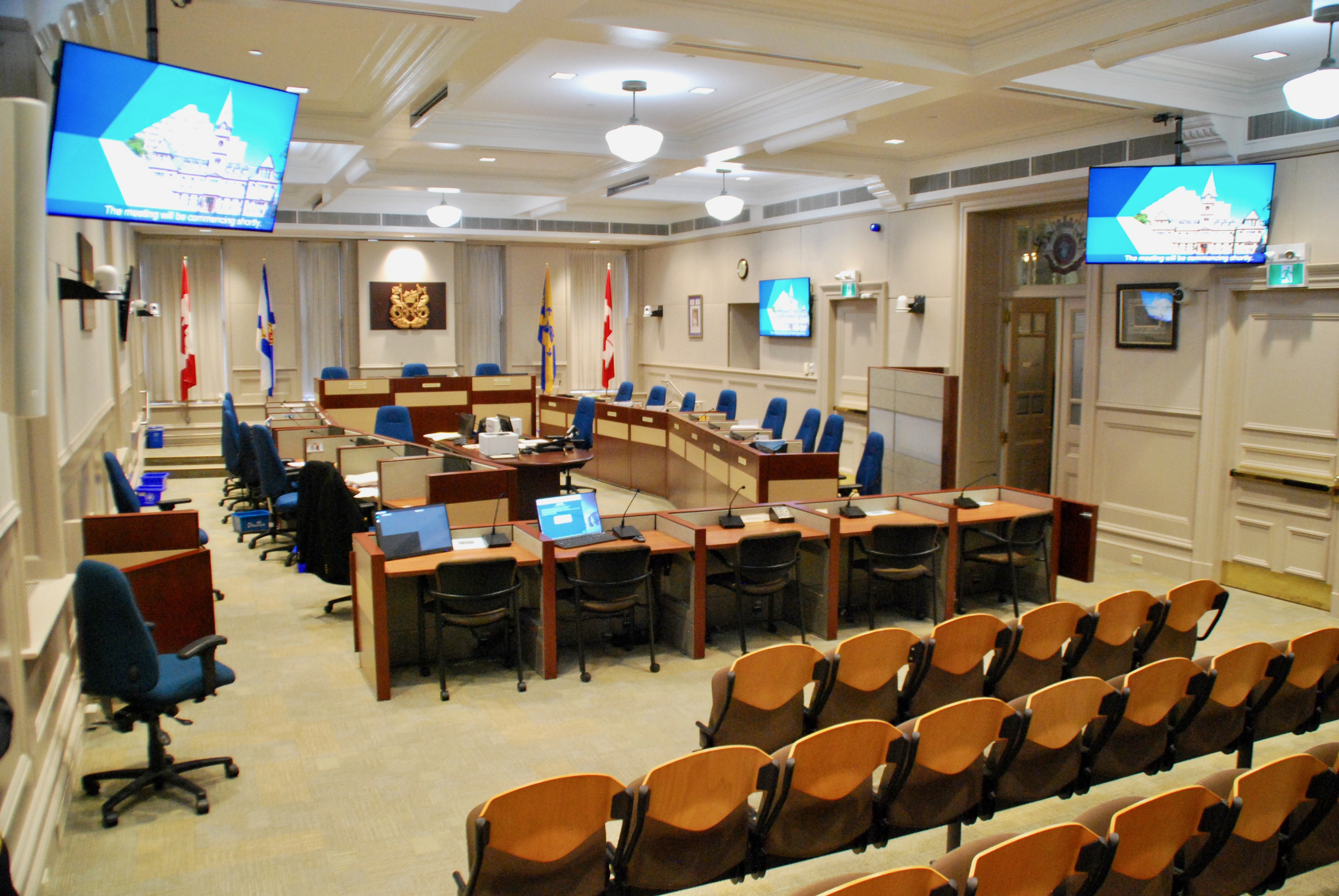
Council Chambers, Halifax City Hall

Council Chambers underwent a major upgrade in 2012. The renovation was driven in part to accommodate the newly downsized 16 member Regional Council, reduced from 23. It also allowed for modern wiring, communications, data and video systems to be installed. An open horseshoe configuration was restored to the chamber that reflects the original layout from 1890.

Halifax City Hall continues to house the offices of the Chief Administrative Officer, the Deputy Chief Administrative Officer, the Municipal Clerk and legislative assistants. The offices and support staff for the municipality's elected officials are also located here, with the Office of the Mayor on the third floor and the Office of the Councillors located on the fourth floor.

Other municipal departments are located in adjacent commercial office space such as the Duke Tower (across the street), Alderney Gate on the Dartmouth waterfront, and various other sites around the region.

== See also ==
- List of oldest buildings and structures in Halifax, Nova Scotia
