= Hugh Bell (educator) =

Canadian politician

Hugh Bell (1780 – 16 May 1860) was a member of the Nova Scotia House of Assembly. He had portraits painted of himself and his wife by Halifax-based artist William Valentine. Bell founded the Nova Scotia Hospital, and was also vice-president of the Royal Acadian School.
