= William Chamberlain Silver =

Canadian merchant (1814-1903)

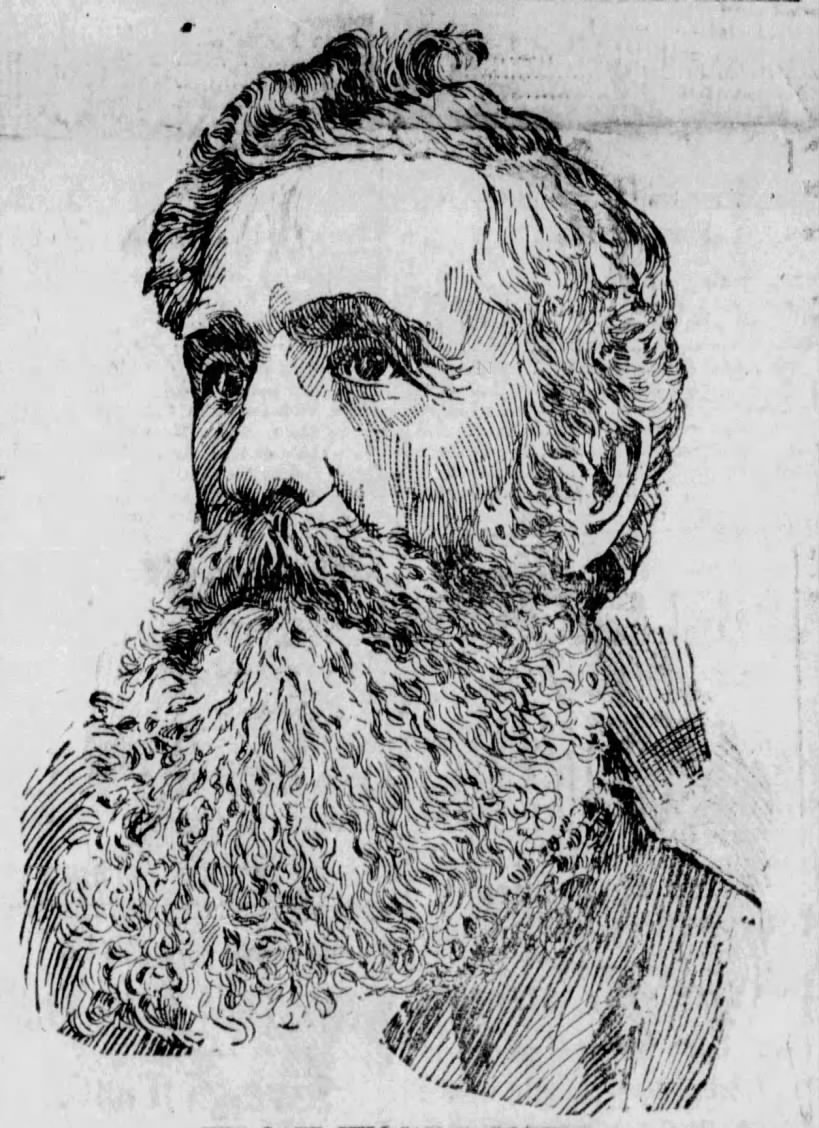
- Born: 3 December 1814; Preston, Nova Scotia, Canada
- Died: 23 February 1903 (aged 88); Halifax, Nova Scotia, Canada
- Other names: W.C. Silver
- Occupation: Merchant
- Spouse: Margaret Ann Etter
- Parents: William Nyren Silver (father); Elizabeth Chamberlain (mother)
- Relatives: Theophilus Chamberlain (grandfather); Benjamin Etter (father-in-law)

William Chamberlain Silver (3 December 1814 – 23 February 1903) was a Canadian merchant who was heavily involved in philanthropy in Nova Scotia.

== Early life ==
William Chamberlain Silver was born on 3 December 1814 in Preston, Nova Scotia, Canada.

His father was William Nyren Silver, who emigrated from Portsmouth, Hampshire, England in 1805. His mother was Elizabeth Chamberlain. His maternal grandfather, Theophilus Chamberlain, was a surveyor and early settler of Preston in Nova Scotia. The Chamberlain family had left New England at the close of the American Revolutionary War. Silver attended the Halifax Academy for his early education. At 20, he served as a colour sergeant in the Light Infantry volunteers, and participated in the military display held in honour of the coronation of Queen Victoria in 1838. He became a devoted disciple of Izaak Walton.

== Career ==
At a young age, William C. Silver began working as a clerk for his father, who was in the dry goods business. In 1840, he became a partner in the firm, which was then called W. N. Silver & Son. He eventually formed a co-partnership, W. & C. Silver, with his brother Charles. He was later joined by his sons, Arthur Peters Silver and Harold St. Clair Silver, in the Halifax firm.

By 1847, Silver was a committee member of the Nova Scotia Auxiliary Bible Society, the provincial branch of the British and Foreign Bible Society. He was elected vice president of the society on 19 January 1885, holding the position until around 1900.

After the Sons of Temperance was established in Nova Scotia, Silver became a member and played a role in founding an institution dedicated to promoting temperance in 1848. The Halifax Temperance Hall Company was established by an act passed on 11 April 1848.

Silver was admitted to the Nova Scotian Institute of Natural Science on 7 May 1864. He was elected to the council of the institute at its anniversary meeting on 12 October 1864. By the late 1860s, he was appointed treasurer of the Nova Scotian Institute of Natural Science, a position he held for over 25 years.

On 31 March 1865, William C. Silver was designated a trustee of Trinity Church in Halifax through an act incorporating its governing board. It was established in connection with the Church of England.

He corresponded with Thomas Frederick Knight, who was working on "The River Fisheries of Nova Scotia," published in 1867. Silver shared observations on the sea trout of Nova Scotia, which he had studied in the waters running through his own lands. The Salmon River was adjoined to his property at Preston.

In January 1868, William C. Silver was among the Halifax merchants who signed a petition to Governor General Charles Monck, 4th Viscount Monck, and the Executive Council, urging the removal of tariffs on corn, cornmeal, and rye flour. Citing widespread hardship due to failed fisheries and crops, the petitioners sought duty-free access to essential food supplies to alleviate distress in Nova Scotia.

Silver was present at the city council chamber on 27 April 1868 for the first meeting in support of the Halifax School for the Blind, where he was elected to the board of managers. He stayed actively involved with the school for nearly 35 years. He was recognized as a benefactor in 1878. He was named vice-president of the board in 1880 and took over as president in 1889 after the death of John S. McLean, serving for 14 years. He knew every department and inspired students and teachers alike during his regular visits.

In 1874 and 1877, Silver was elected as a lay delegate to represent the Diocese of Nova Scotia at the Provincial synod.

By the mid-1870s, his focus shifted to King's College, where he became a committee member of the Incorporated Alumni of King's College in 1878. He assumed the role of vice president of the alumni association in 1881, serving alongside Dr. Thomas Trenaman as president. After stepping down as vice president in 1892, he remained on the executive committee until 1894, when he was replaced at his request due to advancing age.

He presided over many local institutions. Silver held the position of vice president of the St. George's Society by the late 1870s, serving under Lt.-Col. John Wimburn Laurie, before later becoming its president.

In 1876, he was part of the Halifax County Agricultural Society presided over by Sir William Young. On the 7th of December, Silver was elected as the treasurer, a position he held for many years. That same month, he was elected as a member of the Fruit Growers' Association and International Show Society of Nova Scotia. In 1884, he was serving on the association's council representing Halifax County.

In 1879, he became a director of the Halifax Visiting Dispensary. The following year, he was appointed as president of the dispensary, serving for 20 years. He was also among the founders of the Church of England Institute, established on 17 April 1879. Appointed president in 1883 following Rev. George Hill, he served until 1894 and was then named Honorary Life President. While serving as president, he worked on a committee to finance a permanent facility for the institute. The group acquired land on Barrington Street in 1887 for $2,250, with the cornerstone laid the following year in July. He formally resigned in 1895 after twelve years and was succeeded by A. B. Wiswell.

He was named Grand Worthy Patriarch of the Sons of Temperance's Grand Division of Nova Scotia in 1882.

For many years he was vice president of the Halifax Chamber of Commerce and chairman of the Internal Trade Committee. In 1884, Silver was appointed president of the Halifax Chamber of Commerce, a position he held for 11 years.

W.C. Silver was a founding member of the Halifax Steam Navigation Company Limited, incorporated on 19 April 1884 alongside John F. Stairs, Thomas E. Kenny, William Roche Jr., E. P. Archbold, William Gossip, and Joseph Wood, with the objective of managing steamship operations and maritime trade. He later helped establish the Halifax and Newfoundland Steampship Company Limited on 12 January 1888. It was a business focused on operating steamers for carrying passengers, mail, and freight between Nova Scotia, Newfoundland, various Canadian ports, and international destinations.

By the mid-1880s, as president of the Halifax Chamber of Commerce, W. C. Silver advocated for railway expansion to benefit Halifax's trade and commerce. In 1889, he discussed the proposed extension of the Grand Trunk Railway to Halifax.

He helped to establish the Nova Scotia Branch of the Imperial Federation League in Halifax in February 1887. During an important and widely attended meeting, he seconded a resolution advocating for the federation of the British Empire. In his speech, Silver expressed strong support for Imperial Federation, emphasizing its importance for the unity and security of the empire. He viewed the British Empire as a force for civilization and believed that the colonies should have a greater voice in imperial affairs.

On 23 June 1887, William C. Silver played a role in incorporating the Eastern Canada Savings and Loan Company Limited, a Halifax-based institution designed to invest in real estate mortgages, municipal debentures, and government securities. He held positions as vice president and board member, working with Samuel M. Brookfield and James C. Mackintosh.

He joined the Board of Trade of Halifax in 1893/94, an association established to promote trade and protect the city's economic interests.

Silver became involved with the United Empire Loyalist community in his area. When the United Empire Loyalist Association of Nova Scotia was established on 11 May 1897, he was elected as vice president.

Silver emphasized the value of agriculture in the province and the importance of farmers adapting to change. By the mid-1890s, W.C. Silver served as president of the Halifax County Agricultural Society. During its annual meeting on 2 November 1897, he emphasized the need for greater efforts to support Nova Scotia's farmers, particularly highlighting the province's advantages as a grazing region for sheep farming.

Among his many roles in church-related organizations, he served as vice president of the Halifax Young Men's Christian Association and chairman of the Church Endowment Fund Committee. Held in trust by the diocesan synod, the fund was managed and invested by the committee linked to the Church of England in Nova Scotia.

== Personal life ==
William C. Silver married Margaret Ann Etter, daughter of silversmith Benjamin Etter, on 31 August 1840. The pair had 13 children. On 27 August 1868, his daughter Frances E. Silver married John Young Payzant. Another one of his daughters married Rev. John Morton, a Presbyterian minister from Nova Scotia. He had three sons who graduated from King's College.

== Death ==
William Chamberlain Silver died at 88 years old on 23 February 1903 in Halifax, Nova Scotia, Canada.

His funeral service was held on 25 February 1903 at St. Luke's Cathedral, officiated by Rev. E.P. Crawford. The funeral was well attended, with notable figures present including Lt. Gov. Alfred Gilpin Jones, William J. Stairs, William James Armitage, Malachy Bowes Daly, Thomas Edward Kenny, Adam Brown Crosby, William Ross, John Forrest, William Chisholm, and John Young Payzant. As the procession passed the School for the Blind, its band played the "Dead March in Saul." Silver was interred in Camp Hill Cemetery. Wreaths placed at his grave came from the Halifax Dispensary staff, the Canada Loan Co. directors, and the Board of Managers of the School for the Blind. There was a cross from the Church of England Institute's Board and another cross from Lt. Gov. Jones, as well as flowers from Edith Cunningham (sister of Martha Jane Cunningham).
