= Almon =

Almon may refer to:

== People ==
- Almon (surname)
- Almon (given name)

== Places ==
- Almon, Mateh Binyamin, Israel, a settlement in the West Bank
- Almon, Georgia, United States, an unincorporated community
- Almon, Wisconsin, United States, a town
  - Almon (community), Wisconsin, an unincorporated community

== Other ==
- Any tree species of the genus Shorea
- Almon, in Roman mythology a river that was the parent of Larunda
