= Almon (surname) =

Almon is a surname. Notable people with the surname include:

- April Capone Almon (born c. 1975), American businesswoman and politician
- Baylee Almon (1994–1995), baby victim of the Oklahoma City bombing
- Bill Almon (born 1952), American former Major League Baseball player
- Edward B. Almon (1860–1933), American politician
- John Almon (1737–1805), English journalist and writer
- Leroy Almon (1938–1997), American artist known for his woodcarvings and paintings
- Marc Almon, Canadian filmmaker
- Marie Almon, former chief dietitian at Mount Sinai Medical Center in Miami Beach, Florida, who helped create the South Beach Diet
- Mather Byles Almon (1796–1871), Canadian banker, politician and philanthropist
- Reneau P. Almon (1937–2012), justice of the Supreme Court of Alabama
- Shirley Montag Almon (1935–1975), American economist
- Sophie Margaretta Almon Hensley (1866–1946), née Almon, Canadian writer and educator
- William Bruce Almon (1787–1840), doctor and politician in Halifax, Nova Scotia
- William James Almon (1755–1817), doctor and loyalist, father of William Bruce Almon
- William Johnston Almon (1816–1901), Nova Scotian physician and Canadian politician, son of William Bruce Almon

== See also ==
- Robert McAlmon (1895–1956), American writer, poet and publisher
- Terry MacAlmon (born 1955), American Christian singer, songwriter and musician
