= William Almon =

William Almon may refer to:

- William Bruce Almon (1787–1840), doctor and politician in Halifax, Nova Scotia
- William James Almon (1755–1817), doctor and loyalist, father of William Bruce Almon
- William Johnston Almon (1816–1901), Nova Scotian physician and Canadian politician, son of William Bruce Almon
- Bill Almon (born 1952), American baseball infielder
