= Susan Carleton Jones =

Canadian novelist (1865–1926)

- Born: June 25, 1865; Halifax
- Died: July 20, 1926; London
- Occupation: Writer
- Spouse: Guy Carleton Jones
- Parents: Robert Morrow (father); Helen Sophia Stairs (mother)
- Relatives: Helen Morrow Paske Duffus

Susan Carleton Jones (June 25, 1865 – July 20, 1926) was a Canadian novelist and short story writer.

Susan Morrow was born on 1864 in Halifax, Nova Scotia, the daughter of Robert Morrow and Helen Sophia Stairs. Robert Morrow and his father-in-law William Machin Stairs were business partners and among the most successful merchants in Nova Scotia. In 1899, she married her first cousin, Guy Carleton Jones, who became the 4th Canadian Surgeon General. His sisters were the writer Alice Jones and the painter Frances Jones Bannerman.

Some of her work is difficult to attribute due to pseudonyms shared with her sister Helen Morrow Paske Duffus. It is now thought that works published under the name Helen Milecete may have been written entirely by Helen Morrow and works published under the name Carleton-Milecete were likely collaborations between the two. The Milecete novels favorably contrast Nova Scotia with London. A Detached Pirate (1900) is an epistolary novel about a woman who feels stifled in London to the point where she cross-dresses as a man to move freely throughout the city. She finds Nova Scotia spiritually rejuvenating and eventually reunites with her husband. In A Girl of the North (1900), a Canadian woman flees to London after breaking her engagement over a misunderstanding. In London, the protagonist finds a cynical world of unfaithful partners. Just as she accepts a marriage offer from an aristocrat, her Canadian fiancé reappears and clears up the misunderstanding. Ashamed, the woman flees to the Canadian woods, where her original fiancé follows her on snowshoes and they reconcile. In The Career of Mrs. Osbourne (1903), two American sisters gleefully flout social rules in London, smoking and riding busses, but eventually come to terms with who they are.

Much of Susan Carleton Jones' is set in the Canadian wilderness. In "The Lame Priest" (1901), a priest stalks the woods as a werewolf. In "The Frenchwoman's Son" (1904), a man struggles with his mixed-race heritage. The La Chance Mine Mystery (1920) is set at a gold mine in the Laurentian Mountains. She contributed to numerous publications, including The Atlantic Monthly, Lippincott's Magazine, Pall Mall Magazine, Popular Magazine, The Smart Set, and The Thrill Book.

She died in London on July 20, 1926.

== Bibliography ==
- (as Helen Milecete) A Detached Pirate: the Romance of Gay Vandeleur. 1 vol. London: Greening and Co., 1900.
- (as Helen Milecete) A Girl of the North: A Story of London and Canada. 1 vol. London: Greening and Co., 1900.
- (as Carleton-Milecete) The Career of Mrs. Osbourne. New York: Smart Set, 1903.
- (as S. Carleton) The Micmac; or, "The Ribboned Way". New York: Holt, 1904.
- (as Helen Milecete) The Plague of a Heart, 1908.
- (as S. Carleton Jones) Out of Drowning Valley, New York: Holt, 1910.
- (as S. Carleton) The La Chance Mine Mystery. Toronto: McClelland & Stewart, 1920.
- (as S. Carleton) The Forest Runner. London: Melrose, 1925.

=== Short stories (partial bibliography) ===
- (as S. Carleton) "The Lame Priest," Atlantic Monthly, December 1901.
- (as S. Carleton) "The Sound of the Axe," Atlantic Monthly, October 1902.
- (as S. Carleton) "The Frenchwoman's Son," Atlantic Monthly, April 1904.
- (as S. Carleton) "The Tall Man," Atlantic Monthly, January 1907.
- (as S. Carleton) "Last Luck Lake," Popular Magazine, December 1907.
- (as S. Carleton) "The Clasp of Rank," The Thrill Book, April 1, 1919
