= McIlwraith =

McIlwraith or Mcilwraith is a surname. Notable people with the surname include:

- Alan Mcilwraith (born 1978), Scottish fraudster
- Andrew McIlwraith (1844–1932), co-founder of McIlwraith, McEacharn & Co, brother of John and Thomas McIlwraith
- David McIlwraith, Canadian TV actor active since the 1970s
- George McIlraith, Canadian Parliamentarian
- Jean McIlwraith, (1858–1938), Canadian novelist and biographer
- John McIlwraith (businessman) (1828–1902), Manufacturer, Mayor of Melbourne 1873-1874, brother of Andrew and Thomas McIlwraith
- John McIlwraith (commentator), a Scottish-Canadian radio broadcaster
- John McIlwraith (cricketer) (1857–1938), Australian cricket player
- Sheila McIlraith, Canadian computer scientist
- Thomas McIlwraith (1835–1900), three time Premier of Queensland 1879-1883, 1888, and 1893; brother of Andrew and John

== Places ==
- McIlwraith, Queensland, a locality in the Bundaberg Region, Queensland, Australia
- McIlwraith Range, Cape York Peninsula, Far North Queensland, Australia

== Other ==
- McIlwraith, McEacharn & Co, British-Australian shipping company
