= Penny Boudreau =

Canadian woman

- Born: Penny Patricia Dawe; 1974; Ontario
- Children: Karissa Boudreau
- Criminal charge: Second degree murder
- Penalty: Life imprisonment

Penny Patricia Boudreau (born 1974) is a Canadian murderer who killed her 12-year-old daughter Karissa on January 27, 2008, later claiming it was to save her relationship with her boyfriend, Vernon Macumber. At the time of the crime, Boudreau lived in Bridgewater, Nova Scotia.

In July 2018, the Parole Board of Canada granted Boudreau four escorted leaves to be taken in the remainder of the year. She was granted 23 more temporary absences in 2024 for church-related activities, and visiting family. In June 2025 she was granted a 60 day unescorted temporary absence. Her application for day parole was approved in December 2025.

== Early life ==
Boudreau was born in Ontario and grew up in Clark's Harbour in Nova Scotia.

== Murder of Karissa Boudreau ==
Boudreau had a strained relationship with her daughter. Boudreau claims that her former partner, Vernon Macumber, gave her the ultimatum that either her daughter went or he would go. However, Macumber has denied this, stating, "I asked them, 'You have to do something about this,' because this is not a productive family when they're arguing and fighting. I'd come home and hear them screaming and hollering as I'd come up the stairs." Crown Attorney, Paul Scovil, told reporters, "We were satisfied he did not mean ... that she was to kill Karissa." The Crown says Macumber "had no role" in the murder.

On January 27, 2008, she drove Karissa to the outskirts of Bridgewater, tackled her to the ground, and strangled her with twine while kneeling on her chest. Macumber remained at home and was informed by Boudreau that Karissa had vanished from her car after she'd left it unattended. At 8:35 that same evening, Boudreau reported her daughter missing and made an appeal for anyone with information to come forward: “Her eyes swollen from crying, her face pale and drawn, she said, ‘I'm trying not to think the worst. It's plain and simple hell. Not knowing where your kids are is horrible.’” A study by two researchers at Dalhousie University analysed Boudreau's press conference; “We analyzed her facial expression right when she made the plea for help and before there were charges against her. There were some cues to suggest that she was not genuine.”

On February 9, 2008, Karissa's body was found with her jeans and underwear pulled down along the edge of an embankment in Conquerall Bank. This was intended to give the impression of sexual assault, but due to no signs of sexual intercourse, this was ruled out.

=== Arrest and murder charge ===
Boudreau's neighbours subsequently overheard her arguing with Macumber. The couple was consequently arrested on suspicion of murder. Macumber claims, "I told them whatever I could to help them. I always tried to help them until they started looking at me and accused me. I couldn't co-operate then. I was scared to death for me." An undercover police officer shared a cell with Macumber and gained his confidence. The investigation very quickly focused on Boudreau.

The undercover police officer claimed to belong to a crime syndicate and offered Boudreau a deal: if she killed for them, they would get rid of the evidence against her. Boudreau was subsequently recorded on hidden cameras confessing to the undercover police officer and recounting the details of the murder.

=== Sentence ===
She was originally charged with first degree murder, but agreed to plead guilty to the lesser charge of second degree murder, and received a life sentence in January 2009. She must serve at least 20 years before applying for parole.

Macumber stated in an interview that Karissa "made him laugh" and that her death left him heart-broken, that he struggled to find employment as a result of his connections to the case and he consequently began drinking.

=== Parole ===
In 2018, she was granted escorted leave to attend church. In 2019, she was granted additional escorted passes out of prison to attend church. In November 2021, Boudreau was granted escorted passes to attend church, as well as one additional visit to a family friend.

In June 2025 she applied for day parole, but was denied by the Parole Board of Canada However, she was granted an unescorted pass from prison for 60 days.

In December 2025 Penny Boudreau was granted day parole following no incidents during her 60 day unescorted pass from prison She was granted six months of day parole in 2026.

== Media ==
The case was featured in an episode of Deadly Women, and a book.
