= Guy Carleton Jones =

4th Canadian Surgeon General

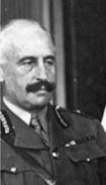
- Died: 23 October 1950; Alassio
- Spouse: Susan Carleton Jones
- Relatives: Alice Jones

Major-General G.C. Jones CMG (25 December 1864 – 23 October 1950) was the 4th Canadian Surgeon General.

== Biography ==
Born in Halifax, Nova Scotia, Guy C., son of politician Alfred Gilpin Jones, "was educated at the Halifax Medical College and later King’s College London."

He began his military career in 1896 when he joined the Canadian Militia "as Surgeon-Lieutenant in the 1st Halifax Regiment, Canadian Artillery; and two years later he was transferred to take command of the first bearer company to be formed in Canada." During the Boer War, Jones served "as second-in-command of the 10th Canadian Field Hospital; and afterwards in the Permanent Force he became Principal Medical Officer for the Maritime Provinces."

He was appointed to the head of the Canadian Army Medical Corps as Director General Medical Services (DGMS) in 1906, and was reappointed to a second term in 1911.

At the beginning of World War I, while still serving as DGMS, he was sent overseas as the assistant director of Medical Services, the senior medical appointment for the Canadian Contingent. When it was subsequently determined that Canada would send a second division, Jones was appointed as Director of Medical Services (Canadians) in February 1915, overseeing medical matters for the Canadian overseas forces from headquarters in London, England, as the force underwent its baptism by fire in the Spring of 1915 and grew rapidly from one to four divisions over the ensuing 18 months.

Major-General Jones retired from the CAMC in 1920 and left Canada. He was detained by enemy forces in 1941 in Italy, to where he had retired with his second wife. He died 23 October 1950, at the age of 85, in Edinburgh, Scotland.
