= USS Acacia =

Tugboat of the United States Navy

History

United States
- Name: USS Acacia
- Launched: September 1863
- Commissioned: 8 December 1863
- Decommissioned: 12 May 1865
- Fate: Sold at public auction

General characteristics
- Type: Tugboat
- Displacement: 300 long tons (300 t)
- Length: 125 ft (38 m)
- Beam: 23 ft 2 in (7.06 m)
- Draft: 11 ft (3.4 m)
- Propulsion: Steam engine
- Speed: 12 kn (14 mph; 22 km/h)
- Complement: 58
- Armament: 2 × 20-pounder (9 kg), 1 × 12-pounder (5 kg) rifled howitzers, 1 × 12-pounder (5 kg) smoothbore howitzer

USS Acacia was a steam-powered tugboat in the service of the United States Navy during the American Civil War, named after the Acacia tree.

She was launched as Vicksburg sometime in September 1863, purchased and renamed by the Navy at Boston, Massachusetts on 28 October 1863, and commissioned in the Boston Navy Yard on 8 December 1863 with Acting Master John D. Childs in command.

== Chesapeake ==
While the new tug was preparing for service in the South Atlantic Blockading Squadron, 17 Confederate agents disguised as passengers seized Chesapeake off Cape Cod, Massachusetts on 7 December 1863 as that packet was steaming from New York City to Portland, Maine. The liner's captors took her to Saint John, New Brunswick, where, the next day, they landed the prize's bonafide passengers, her former captain, and most of her crew.

Word of the takeover reached Portland on the morning of 9 December and quickly spread from there. The news prompted Federal officials at northern ports along the coast to speedy action.

At 16:00 that afternoon, Acacia sailed in search of the Chesapeake. En route, however, she began taking on water so fast that she soon found herself "in a sinking condition" and was forced to seek haven at Portland. On the morning of 11 December, Childs wired from there back to Boston, "Through the help of the fire department the Acacia is now alongside a wharf, where she can not sink."

While Acacia was undergoing repairs at Portland, other Union ships continued to hunt for Chesapeake. On 17 December, the recently captured blockade runner Ella and Annie — which had been hastily manned, armed, and sent to sea — finally caught up with her at Sambro, Nova Scotia. Shortly thereafter, the Northern gunboat Dacotah arrived on the scene; and her commanding officer prevented Ella and Annie from taking the recaptured tug back to Boston, lest such action seriously undermine relations between the United States and the British Empire. Instead, to observe diplomatic niceties, he escorted Chesapeake to Halifax where he asked Canadian courts to restore her to her owner. The following morning, the repaired Acacia arrived at Halifax with witnesses who could identify and testify against the Southern sailors.

== South Atlantic ==
Her work along the Canadian coast completed, Acacia returned to Boston and resumed her preparation for blockade duty along the coast of the Carolinas. When ready, she proceeded south via Hampton Roads, Virginia, and arrived off Morris Island, South Carolina on the evening of 6 January 1864. The tug served in the South Atlantic Blockading Squadron for the remainder of the war, spending most of her time near Breach Inlet in the line of Union warships outside Charleston Bar. From time to time during her deployment, she had brushes with blockade runners, occasionally forcing the escaping ships to turn back into port and compelling vessels attempting to enter back out to sea.

Ironically, her greatest success came on the morning of 23 December, not when she was on her blockade station, but while she was steaming from Charleston bar to Georgetown, South Carolina, with provisions for screw sloop Canandaigua. As she was passing Cape Romain Shoal, a lookout in the masthead reported two white smokestacks close inshore. Acacia altered course and, "on closing in toward the bar, discovered ... a sidewheel steamer of perhaps 400 long tons (410 t). No colors could be seen." The stranger's decks were crowded with men preparing to abandon her.

Acacia continued "in as near as the depth of water would admit and fired a shell over her." She then lowered her boats, armed them for boarding, and fired another shot over them as they approached the stranded ship. The stranded steamer then sent up white flags as her own boats began pulling toward the mouth of Alligator Creek where they escaped.

Not a soul remained on board the blockade runner when the Union sailors reached her shortly past noon. Upon boarding the prize, they learned that she was Julia, a fast, shallow-draft, iron-hulled vessel built in 1863 at Renfrew, Scotland — apparently for the express purpose of violating the Federal blockade. "Her engines had been purposely disabled ..." and she was hard aground. The almost heroic efforts of the boarding party managed to get Julia afloat and underway on her own power shortly after daylight on the following morning, and she was ultimately sent to Key West where she was condemned by the prize court.

== Post-war ==
After the end of the Civil War, Acacia sailed for Philadelphia on 24 April 1865. She was decommissioned in the navy yard at that port on 12 May and sold at public auction there. Redocumented as SS Wabash on 13 October, she served as a merchantman until abandoned in 1881.
