= Halifax Chamber of Commerce =

Organization in Nova Scotia, Canada

- Formation: 1750; 276 years ago
- Headquarters: 32 Akerley Blvd, Dartmouth, Nova Scotia
- Website: halifaxchamber.com

Halifax Chamber of Commerce, also known as the Halifax Chamber, is the oldest chamber of commerce in North America. It was founded in 1750.

== History ==
Established in 1750, the Halifax Chamber of Commerce was formed by Halifax's early merchants. Merchants played a key role in the town's development following its founding by the British in 1749.

The organization aimed to support Halifax's economic growth and elevate its commercial standing in the Colony of Nova Scotia and beyond. The chamber addressed issues through dedicated committees on foreign trade, fisheries, harbor regulations, tariffs, city taxation, railways, and more. The Halifax Chamber of Commerce became a respected and influential organization that significantly contributed to the town's progress.

=== 18th century ===
Through early trade between 1768 and 1784, Halifax exchanged its fishery produce and timber for British goods like linen, woolens, and equipment for ships.

=== 19th century ===
The Halifax Chamber later initiated the grain elevator campaign. Around the mid-1870s, a delegate traveled west to urge brokers and merchants to use Halifax as Canada's grain shipping port. With Halifax as a grain shipping port, winter trade could flow through a grain elevator set up at Richmond. By 1877, Halifax had been designated the winter port for receiving and dispatching all ocean mail for the Dominion.

The group then helped secure the railway extension from Richmond to North Street with a deep cut rather than street-level crossings and improved freight access on the Intercolonial Railway (I.C.R.) for local industries. It also secured winter mail boats. As of 1883, the organization had backed the railway extension, the West's wharf terminus, a grain elevator, sugar refinery development, mail and passenger service by the Allan Line, freight reductions, duty reforms, and more.

The reorganized chamber of commerce held its first meeting on April 11, 1884, with members including President John Doull, W. C. Silver, C. F. DeWolf, J. Pugh, Dr. Farrell, E. O'Bryan, S. Sichel, F. C. Ellot, Alfred Shortt, D. H. Pitts, B. W. Chipman, John Starr, J. T. Wood, and J. A. Lipman.

The chamber of commerce sessions in the mid-1880s attracted many of the city's foremost business leaders. Notable figures included William J. Stairs, Malachy Bowes Daly, James Crosskill Mackintosh, Alexander Stephen, William Roche, Robert Pickford, Edward Kenney, Alfred Gilpin Jones, and Thomas Fyshe, among others.

On June 11, 1886, a chamber meeting brought together thirty to forty participants. They discussed the Nova Scotia Railway, the 1886 Anglo-Spanish treaty, sugar testing with the polariscope, and extending the Intercolonial Railway along the city's front. The chamber, in 1890, advocated for the Grand Trunk Railway—then ending in Quebec—to be extended into Nova Scotia. The Halifax Chamber was instrumental in bringing about the completion and opening of the direct West India cable in 1898.

=== 21st century ===
The present-day Halifax Chamber of Commerce, a business advocacy organization, is situated at 32 Akerley Blvd in Dartmouth, Nova Scotia.

The official publication of the organization is a business magazine titled Business Voice. The Halifax Chamber organizes the Halifax Business Awards each year to acknowledge the city's business community.

The current head of the Halifax Chamber of Commerce is Patrick Sullivan, serving as president and CEO.

In 2020, the Halifax Chamber of Commerce Board of Directors, which advises and governs Chamber policy, became an early adopter of the 50–30 Challenge introduced by Hon. Navdeep Bains.

== Past presidents ==
Notable former presidents have included:

- John Doull
- William Chamberlain Silver (1884–1895)
- Irvine Barrow
