= Matthew Henry Richey =

Canadian politician (1828–1911)

The Honourable Matthew Henry Richey
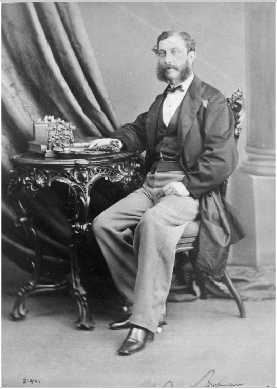
- Richey in 1866

5th Lieutenant Governor of Nova Scotia
- In office July 4, 1883 – July 9, 1888
- Monarch: Victoria
- Governors General: Marquess of Lorne; The Marquess of Lansdowne; The Lord Stanley of Preston
- Premier: William Thomas Pipes; William S. Fielding
- Preceded by: Adams George Archibald
- Succeeded by: Archibald McLelan

Personal details
- Born: June 10, 1828 Windsor, Nova Scotia
- Died: February 21, 1911 (aged 82) Halifax, Nova Scotia, Canada
- Party: Liberal-Conservative
- Spouse: Sarah Lavinia Richey (née Anderson)
- Parent: Matthew Richey (father)
- Occupation: Lawyer
- Profession: Politician

Matthew Henry Richey (June 10, 1828 – February 21, 1911) was a Canadian politician in the 19th century.

Richey was the son of Matthew Richey, Methodist minister from Nova Scotia. The family was of Ulster-Scottish ancestry, his father having immigrated to Canada.

Richey studied law in Windsor, Province of Canada, was called to the bar in 1850 and practised law in Halifax. He served on the city council and was twice elected mayor of Halifax.

Richey was a Conservative politician and in 1878 he was elected to the Parliament of Canada. In 1883, he became the fifth Lieutenant Governor of Nova Scotia, a position he held until 1888.

1878 Canadian federal election: Halifax
Party	Candidate	Votes	%	Elected
Liberal–Conservative	Matthew Henry Richey	3,532	28.13	✓
Liberal–Conservative	M.B. Daly	3,466	27.60	✓
Independent	Alfred Gilpin Jones	2,863	22.80	
Independent Liberal	Patrick Power	2,695	21.46	
Total valid votes		12,556	100.00	

Canadian federal by-election, 29 January 1878
Party	Candidate	Votes	%	Elected
Independent	Alfred Gilpin Jones	2,981	51.92	✓
Unknown	Matthew Henry Richey	2,761	48.08	
Total valid votes		5,742	100.00	
Called upon the resignation of Alfred Jones because of an alleged breach of the Independence of Parliament Act
