= Sara Jeannette Duncan =

Canadian author and journalist (1861–1922)

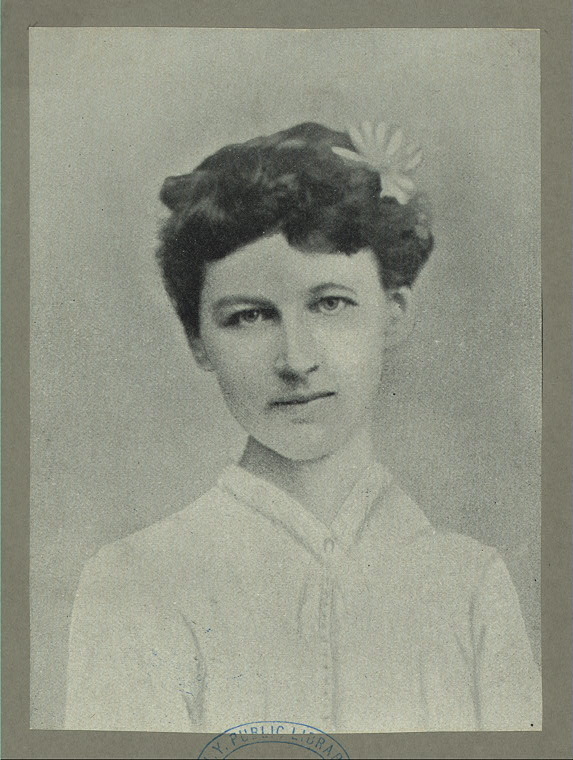
- Sara Jeannette Duncan, c. 1900
- Born: Sarah Janet Duncan; 22 December 1861; Brantford, Canada West
- Died: 22 July 1922 (aged 60); Ashtead, Surrey, England
- Occupations: Journalist, novelist
- Spouse: Everard Charles Cotes (m. 1890)
- Writing career
- Pen name: Mrs. Everard Cotes; Garth Grafton; Jane Wintergreen; others
- Years active: 1880–1922
- Genres: Fiction, travel writing, journalism
- Notable works: A Social Departure; The Imperialist

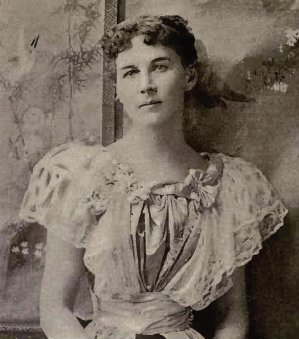
Sara Jeannette Duncan in her youth.

Sara Jeannette Duncan (22 December 1861 – 22 July 1922) was a Canadian author and journalist, who also published as Mrs. Everard Cotes (her married name) and Garth Grafton among other names. First trained as a teacher in a normal school, she took to poetry early in life and after a brief teaching period worked as a travel writer for Canadian newspapers and a columnist for the Toronto Globe. Afterward she wrote for the Washington Post where she was put in charge of the current literature section. Later she made a journey to India and married an Anglo-Indian civil servant thereafter dividing her time between England and India. She wrote 22 works of fiction, many with international themes and settings. Her novels met with mixed acclaim and are rarely read today. In 2016, she was named a National Historic Person on the advice of the Historic Sites and Monuments Board of Canada.

== Life ==
Born Sarah Janet Duncan on 22 December 1861 at 96 West Street, Brantford, Canada West (now Ontario), (Note: A memorial plaque was placed by the Archaeological and Historic Sites Board of Ontario in 1962 at Duncan's birthplace.) she was the oldest daughter of Charles Duncan, a well-off Scottish immigrant who worked as a dry goods and furniture merchant, and his wife, Jane (née Bell), who was Canada-born of Irish descent. She trained as a teacher, taking a third-class certificate at Brantford Model School and her second-class certificate at Toronto Normal School, but always had an eye on a literary career. She had poetry printed as early as 1880, two years before she fully qualified as a teacher. A period of supply teaching in the Brantford area ended in December 1884, when she travelled to New Orleans after persuading The Globe newspaper in Toronto and the Advertiser in London, Ontario to pay her for articles about the World Cotton Centennial. Her articles were published under the pseudonym "Garth" and reprinted in other newspapers. They led The Globe to offer her a regular weekly column when she returned to Canada some months later.

Duncan wrote her "Other People and I" column for The Globe during the summer of 1885 using the name "Garth Grafton". She then moved to the Washington Post in Washington D. C., where she was soon put in charge of the current literature department. She was back as "Garth Grafton" at The Globe in summer 1886, taking over the "Woman's World" section that had emerged. As in Washington, she contributed more generally as a member of the editorial staff. While the "Woman's World" column was fairly light in tone, she also wrote a more serious column for The Week, a Toronto-based literary periodical, using the names "Jeannette Duncan" and "Sara Jeannette Duncan". Her biographer, Misao Dean, says that "well-suited to the Week, her strongly defined progressive views on international copyright, women's suffrage, and realist fiction made her work remarkable in such conservative journals as the Globe and the Post."

In early 1887, Duncan became parliamentary correspondent for the Montreal Star, basing herself in Ottawa. In 1888, she embarked on a world tour with a friend, Montreal journalist Lily Lewis. The idea of a woman travelling alone at that time was unconventional. Her intention was to gather material for a book, although both also filed stories to the Star as they travelled. In 1889, during this tour, she attended a function in Calcutta organised by Lord Lansdowne, then Viceroy of India, whom she had previously known in Canada. There she met the Anglo-Indian civil servant Everard Charles Cotes, who was working as an entomologist in the Indian Museum. The couple married a year later on 6 December 1890, after a proposal at the Taj Mahal.

After her marriage, Duncan split her time mostly between England and India, often spending much of it alone in rented flats in Kensington, London. The travelling was necessitated by her continued writing commitments in several countries. There had been plans for her and Everard to return permanently to England in 1894, but these came to nothing: her husband reinvented himself as a journalist and edited the Calcutta-based Indian Daily News in 1894–97, later becoming managing director of the Eastern News Agency. Although Marian Fowler, a biographer, argued that the couple's marriage was unhappy (based on E. M. Forster's off-hand and misinterpreted observation that "Mrs. Cotes [is] difficult, and I fancy unhappy"), hers is not the accepted view. Duncan certainly supported her husband in various work-related endeavours. She also cultivated a friendship with James Louis Garvin while he was editor of The Outlook and The Observer, at least in part hoping he might find a position for Everard in Britain. Warkentin suggests that theirs may have been "one of those marriages in which a difficult woman and a gentle, agreeable man made common cause."

Sometimes she lived at Simla, the summer capital of the British Raj. There she entertained Forster in November 1912. He noted a characteristic ambivalence in her manner, saying that she was "clever and odd – [at times very (crossed out)] nice to talk to alone, but at times the Social Manner descended like a pall." His letters also speak to Duncan's continued involvement with political ideas: "I don't talk about politics [...] although at the Cotes, I have been living in them."

Around the time of World War I, during which Duncan and her husband were unable to be together, she began to take an interest in writing plays, but had little success. She maintained her interest until 1921, two years after her husband had finally left India and the couple had taken residence in Chelsea.

Duncan had been treated for tuberculosis in 1900, spending the summer out of doors in the fresh air of Simla, as chronicled in On the Other Side of the Latch (1901), published in the United States and Canada as The Crow's Nest. She died of chronic lung disease on 22 July 1922 at Ashtead, Surrey, whence she and her husband had moved in 1921. She had been a smoker and it is possible that the cause of death was emphysema, although her lung problems generally may have been exacerbated by the climate and sanitation in Calcutta. She was buried at St Giles's Church, Ashtead, and left a CAD$13,000 estate. Though she rarely returned to Canada after marrying Everard, and last visited in 1919, she had always insisted that the royalties from her books were paid into her bank account in Brantford. Everard was her beneficiary; he and Duncan had no children. Everard remarried in 1923, fathering two children before his death in 1944.

Among Duncan's contacts in the literary world were the journalists Goldwin Smith (of the Week) and John Stephen Willison, the novelist and editor Jean McIlwraith, and George William Ross. She also had some contact with William Dean Howells and Henry James, whose writings she admired.

== Works ==
Duncan moved from journalism to writing fiction after her marriage to Cotes. Thereafter, she published books under various names, including a volume of personal sketches and a collection of short stories. These were usually serialised in magazines and newspapers before being published as books in Britain and the US. She had a regular writing routine that involved composing 300–400 words each morning and she planned her future works well ahead of their publication. (Note: Cousin Cinderella was at least three years in planning, while her agents arranged multi-book publishing deals on her behalf on at least three occasions.) Her agents were Alexander Pollock Watt and his sons, Alexander Strahan and Hansard.

Duncan tended to identify as an Anglo-Indian. Nine of her novels are set in India and most of her works are in the setting of Anglo-Indian society, of which she said "there is such abundance of material ... it is full of such picturesque incidence, such tragic chance". The progress of her novels show her experimenting with different genres that might sell well or were known to be popular, and they were of increasing complexity. Generally, she followed a nineteenth-century tradition of "society" novels in which personal and public politics might play a part – epitomised by writers such as William Makepeace Thackeray and Anthony Trollope. Although she admired Howells and James, she did not often emulate them, with The Path of a Star (1899) being a notable exception. A recurring theme is an examination of the nature of authority and its relationship to autonomy, which was a topic that much concerned her mostly middle-class audience. Particularly adept with dialogue but less so with point of view, much of her work is ironic in tone and, according to Dean, attempts

to define representative types of characters, often nationally or culturally differentiated. Her work frequently focuses on females, addressing their ethical and personal choices in the context of their dual imperative to develop as individuals and represent moral ideas. Duncan thus creates a kind of heroine who defines herself through love, travel, and artistic vocation, and whose gender politics is linked to a critique of imperial-colonial relations.

Duncan's first book was her most successful; "cheerfully anecdotal", says Warkentin, and "written with flair and self-conscious charm; it was written to sell, and sell it did." Titled A Social Departure: How Orthodocia and I Went Around The World by Ourselves, it was published in 1890 and fictionalized her around-the-world trip with Lewis. It contains the first description of the city of Vancouver in fiction. According to Dean, the book "relies on the strengths of Duncan's journalism – close observation, description of manners, and wry humour – while transforming the narrator's travelling companion from the sophisticated Lewis into a naive and romantic English girl." Her next two novels, An American Girl in London (1891) and The Simple Adventures of a Memsahib (1893) followed a similar pattern, but then came A Daughter of To-day (1894), described by Dean as her first "serious novel" and by Warkentin as a "new woman" work that is "flawed but fascinating". It was with this fourth book that she took to using both her married and maiden name.

A Voyage of Consolation (1897) was a sequel to internationally themed An American Girl in London. The autobiographical On the Other Side of the Latch (1901) was set in Duncan's garden in Simla, where she had been forced to spend seven months while recovering from her tuberculosis infection. Warkentin sees this work as an example of her eye for a commercial opportunity.

Duncan occasionally strayed from the subject of Anglo-Indian society and is best-known and most studied today for The Imperialist, a 1904 work which was her only novel set in Canada and centers on a fictional town modeled on Brantford. It had at best a mixed reception: Germaine Warkentin says that despite being "the first truly modern Canadian novel", it was too progressive for its audience, poorly received and remained largely unread until the 1960s. Nowadays, it is the most popular of her works and the remainder, once generally much more popular, are read mainly as a means of contextualizing it. Dean says that at the time of publication

The London Spectator complained that it hid a medicinal message in a spoonful of jam while the Globe asserted that Duncan was disqualified by her gender from writing on political subjects. The New York Times praised the work, however, as did Toronto Saturday Night: "To the Canadian, to the Ontarian especially, it means more than any other Canadian story, for it gives with truth and with art a depiction of our own community."

Cousin Cinderella (1908) is set in London, and with His Royal Happiness (1914) constitutes the other work by Duncan that has significant Canadian themes, although neither is set in Canada. While not studied to the extent of The Imperialist, Cousin Cinderella is considered by Anna Snaith to be an important work:

While Duncan was no radical, Cousin Cinderella's feminism, its Canadian nationalism and its critique of Canada's place within the empire make it an important text of colonial modernity, particularly in relation to gender and urban space. ... Duncan's is a rare and subtle look, for the period, at how the economic and political workings of imperialism affect women and the private sphere of personal relations.

Some later books – notably Set in Authority (1906), written in particularly ironic style, and The Burnt Offering (1909) – took as their theme the subject of Indian nationalism. In these she was able to draw on the similarities of experience between her colonised homeland and her colonised adopted land. Set in Authority, which was titled The Viceroy until very near to publication, stands out as a notable failure in her commercial sense and an act perhaps of stubbornness, being an overtly political novel published immediately after the poor reception of The Imperialist, which itself had been a novel about politics. Its central character, Anthony Andover, is now known to have been based on Lord Curzon, who was unpopular with Anglo-Indians.

His Royal Happiness was adapted for the stage in 1915.

Today, says Warkentin, with the exception of The Imperialist, Duncan's œuvre "appears only occasionally in the writings of students of feminism and post-colonialism trawling the backwaters of the Edwardian novel, and almost never in accounts of Anglo-Indian literature".

== Selected bibliography ==
- A Social Departure: How Orthodocia and I Went Round The World by Ourselves. New York, Appleton. 1890. as Sara Jeanette Duncan
- Two Girls on a Barge. New York, D. Appleton and Company. 1891. as V. Cecil Cotes, published in March
- An American Girl in London. 1891. ISBN 9780665052903. as Sara Jeanette Duncan, published in August
- The Simple Adventures of a Memsahib. 1893. ISBN 9780665052958. as Sara Jeanette Duncan
- A Daughter of To-day: A Novel. D. Appleton and company. 1894. as Mrs Everard Cotes (Sara Jeanette Duncan)
- Vernon's Aunt: Being the Oriental Experiences of Miss Lavinia Moffat. 1894. as Sara Jeanette Duncan (Mrs Everard Cotes)
- The Story of Sonny Sahib. Macmillan. 1894. as Mrs Everard Cotes (Sara Jeanette Duncan)
- His Honour and a Lady. 1896. ISBN 9780665269752. as Sara Jeanette Duncan (Mrs Everard Cotes)
- A Voyage of Consolation (being in the nature of a sequel to the experiences of 'An American Girl in London'). 1897. ISBN 9780665052996. as Sara Jeanette Duncan (Mrs Everard Cotes)
- Hilda: A Story of Calcutta. F.A. Stokes. 1898. as Sarah Jeanette Duncan (Mrs Everard Cotes)
- The Path of a Star. 1899. as Mrs Everard Cotes (Sara Jeanette Duncan)
- On the Other Side of the Latch. 1901. as Sara Jeanette Duncan — Mrs Everard Cotes. Also published under the title The Crow's Nest. 1901. as Mrs Everard Cotes (Sara Jeanette Duncan)
- Those Delightful Americans. New York, D. Appleton and company. 1902. as Mrs Everard Cotes (Sara Jeanette Duncan)
- The Little Widows of a Dynasty an article published in Harper's Magazine (1902)
- The Pool in the Desert. D. Appleton and company. 1903. as Mrs Everard Cotes (Sara Jeanette Duncan) – a collection of short stories
- Duncan, Sara Jeannette (1904). The Imperialist. ISBN 9780771091209. as Mrs Everard Cotes (Sara Jeanette Duncan)
- Set in Authority. 1906. as Mrs Everard Cotes (Sara Jeanette Duncan)
- Cousin Cinderella. 1908. as Mrs Everard Cotes (Sara Jeanette Duncan) (the US edition was subtitled A Canadian girl in London)
- Two in a Flat. 1908. as Jane Wintergreen (Note: Two in a Flat was not a success and a friend claimed that failure to be the reason why the Wintergreen pseudonym would not have been re-used.)
- The Burnt Offering. New York, J. Lane company. 1909. as Mrs Everard Cotes (Sara Jeanette Duncan)
- The Consort. 1912. ISBN 9780665991455. as Mrs Everard Cotes (Sara Jeanette Duncan)
- His Royal Happiness. 1914. as Mrs Everard Cotes
- Title Clear. 1922
- Posthume: The Gold Cure. Hutchinson, London 1924 online

Carl Klinck believed it was possible that a book called Out of the City was authored by Duncan pseudonymously but seems not to have been able to confirm his suspicions.
