= Everard Charles Cotes =

English-born Indian entomologist

Everard Charles Cotes (1862 – 4 October 1944) was an English-born entomologist who worked at the Indian Museum in Calcutta. He later became a journalist after marrying the famous Canadian journalist, novelist and playwright Sara Jeannette Duncan. He published a number of scientific books and papers on entomology as well as two more journalistic books resulting from his travels. The wasp genus Cotesia is named in his honour.

== Early life ==
Cotes was the first son of the Rev. Septimus Cotes, Rector of Newington, Oxfordshire, from 1845. He attended Clifton College and matriculated at Oxford University in June 1881 without belonging to a college. He gained honours in mathematical Mods in 1883. There is no clear indication that he ever went on to take an Oxford degree and his books do not attribute any degree to him on their title pages.

== Early years as an entomologist ==
He then went to India and in April 1884 began working in the Natural History section at the Indian Museum, Calcutta, with the position of First Assistant to the Superintendent. In December 1891 another person took his position while he served temporarily as Deputy Superintendent. He returned to his former rank in March 1892 but in May the same year he was appointed Deputy Superintendent and retained that position until he resigned in April 1895. On the suggestion of Sir Edward Charles Buck, he unofficially took an interest in economic entomology and investigated rice and wheat pests, starting from 1888, publishing a series of reports including on pest management measures. During these years he published a considerable number of books and papers on Indian entomology, a subject which had presumably interested him prior to his departure from England. His successor Lionel de Niceville was appointed entomologist to the Government of India in 1901.

== Marriage ==
Sara Jeannette Duncan met Cotes on 28 February 1889 during a visit to India, at a reception at the Calcutta mansion of the Viceroy, Lord Lansdowne, whom she had previously met in Canada. A few weeks later, she accepted Everard's proposal of marriage, made during a visit to the Taj Mahal. They were married on 6 December 1890, in St. Thomas' Church, Calcutta.

During the spring of 1891 they visited Europe, but were back in India by June. Little is known of Cotes's relationship with his wife. Clearly an independent woman, she made frequent trips to England and North America, sometimes accompanied by Cotes but often alone. She was a very professional writer and is reported to have spent at least some time writing every day. After her marriage, she always published using the name "Mrs Everard Cotes" in conjunction with her own name, "Sara Jeannette Duncan." In April 1894, after Cotes resigned from the Museum, it seemed that they would go back to England permanently. They visited Paris on their way to England, and Cotes began to plan a completely new career, in journalism, probably inspired by his wife. Cotes seems to have planned to stay in England but by January 1895 they were back in India, where Cotes had been offered the position of Editor of the Indian Daily News (Calcutta), a position he held until 1897. Duncan assisted him by writing editorials and articles during those years, while she continued to write the novels for which she is celebrated.

== A Journalist in India ==
In March 1897, Cotes resigned from the Indian Daily News and became a government press correspondent in Simla, where they had a house. By 1900, after making several journeys to England and North America, Duncan was diagnosed with tuberculosis. She was by now back living with Cotes in Simla. In 1901 they moved to Calcutta, where Cotes was charged with finding recruits for the Boer War After several years of this kind of living, he moving between Calcutta and Simla, his wife between India and England or North America, Cotes set off alone early in 1906 on a visit with other journalists to the Far East, passing through China, Manchuria, Korea and Japan, not long after the end of the Russo-Japanese War. This resulted in his first more journalistic book, Signs and Portents in the Far East, published early in 1907 in London and New York.

In 1907 the Indian News Agency was established by Cotes, who had previously also been serving as the Indian correspondent of the London Daily Mail. In 1910 the INA was taken over by Reuters with the formation of the Eastern News Agency. Reuters owned one half, Cotes the other half included Associated Press of India and Indian News Agency, an important position that he held from 1910 until 1919. In 1912, Cotes's wife brought her niece, Nellie Masterman, back to India with her and she stayed there with Cotes until his final departure from India in 1919. In November 1912 they moved to Delhi in order to be closer to the source of news. However, apart from a period of life in Simla in 1915, Cotes's wife was absent from India throughout the War. She was writing plays, which were produced in Canada and London with limited success.

== Return to England ==
Cotes finally sold his share in the Eastern News Agency in 1919, and joined his wife in London, where they leased a house, 17 Paultons Square in Chelsea. He retained the connection with Reuters, serving as a Reuters correspondent. Duncan visited Canada for the last time in the autumn of 1919, together with her husband, who was reporting for Reuters on the tour of the Prince of Wales. In 1920, Cotes spent seven months touring Australia with the Prince of Wales and the following year he published Down Under with the Prince, his account of the tour. In May 1922 they moved to a house in Ashtead, Surrey, but Duncan's health was failing and she died on 22 July 1922. She was buried in the churchyard of St Giles Church in Ashtead, with the inscription "This leaf was blown far". Cotes, who was her beneficiary, worked as parliamentary correspondent for the Christian Science Monitor in the following years.

In 1923, already aged 61, he married Phoebe Violet Delaforce. His second wife had been born in 1900 in Portugal, the daughter of Henry John Delaforce, of a notable port-wine shipping family. They had two children, John and Mary. Everard Charles Cotes died at their home, Birdshill Cottage, Oxshott, Surrey, on 4 October 1944.

== Publications ==
Entomology

- A Catalogue of the Moths of India, compiled by E. C. Cotes, First Assistant to the Superintendent, Indian Museum, Calcutta and Colonel Charles Swinhoe F.L.S, F.Z.S.. Calcutta : Printed by order of the Trustees of the Indian Museum (1887) Volume 1-7

Shorter papers:

- The Experimental Introduction of Insecticides into India. With a short account of modern insecticides and methods of applying them. (1888)
- A Preliminary Account of the Wheat and Rice Weevil in India (Notes on Economic Entomology. no. 1.) (1888)
- Notes On Economic Entomology. (1889)
- Silkworms in India (1890)
- Cotes, E.C. (1891) The Locusts of Bengal, Madras, Assam and Bombay Indian Mus. Notes, 2 (4): 99-101.
- White Insect Wax in India, etc (1891)
- The Wild Silk Insects of India (1891)
- Silk. Office of the Superintendent of Government Printing, India, 1893
- An Elementary Manual of Zoology Designed for the Use of Forest Officers in India. Prepared for the Forest Department of India by E. C. Cotes, Deputy Superintendent of the Indian Museum, Calcutta, and Lecturer on Zoology at the Imperial Forest School, Dehra Dun. Calcutta: Office Of The Superintendent, Government Printing, India. 1893. (Cover title: Indian Forest Zoology)
- "The Poisonous Snakes of India" by E.C. Cotes in McClure's Magazine, April 1894, pp. 466–474
- An account of the insects and mites which attack the tea plant in India. Calcutta : Superintendent of government printing, India, 1895

Journalistic books

- Everard Cotes. Signs and Portents in the Far East. London: Methuen / New York: G. P. Putnam's Sons.1907.
- Everard Cotes. Down Under with the Prince. London: Methuen. 1921.
