= Alice Jones (author) =

Canadian writer (1853–1933)

Alice C. Jones
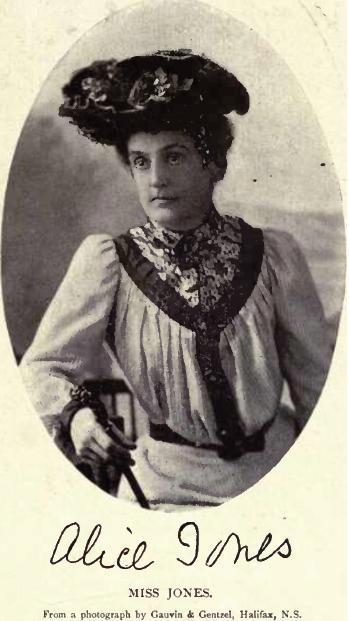
- Born: August 25, 1853; Halifax, Nova Scotia
- Died: February 27, 1933 (aged 79); Menton, France
- Occupations: Novelist, travel essayist
- Writing career
- Pen name: Alix John
- Period: 20th century
- Genres: Fiction, travel writing

Alice C. Jones (pen name, Alix John; 1853–1933) was a Canadian novelist and travel writer. Born to wealthy parents, she travelled extensively in Europe and the West Indies. She wrote a series of essays about her travels in the Canadian magazine The Week. Upon her return to Canada she wrote a series of novels featuring strong female protagonists.

== Biography ==
Alice Jones was born August 25, 1853, in Halifax, Nova Scotia, to Lieutenant-Governor Alfred Gilpin Jones and Margaret Wiseman Stairs. In the 1880s and 1890s, she travelled to Europe and the West Indies. During her travels, she wrote short stories for magazines including The Week and Frank Leslie's Monthly. Her visits to places in the Mediterranean led to the publication of a series of travel essays which appeared in The Week.

When she returned to Halifax after her travels, she turned to writing novels. Her first novel, The Night Hawk was published in 1903 under the pen name, "Alix John". In 1905, she moved to Menton, France, and remained there until her death on February 27, 1933.

The women in Jones' stories are prominently strong of character which was unusual at the time. Many of her books featured Canadian themes of wilderness and the relationship between environment and character. In 1903, The Canadian Magazine called her the 'leading woman novelist in Canada' and the Oxford Companion to Canadian Literature compared her to Sara Jeannette Duncan in her emphasis on strong women characters.

== Works ==
- The Night Hawk (1901) [written as Alix John]
- Bubbles We Buy (1903)
- Gabriel Praed's Castle (1904)
- Marcus Holbaech's Daughter (1912)
- Flames of Frost (1914)
