= Lawrence Geoffrey Power =

Canadian politician

The Honourable Lawrence Geoffrey Power PC
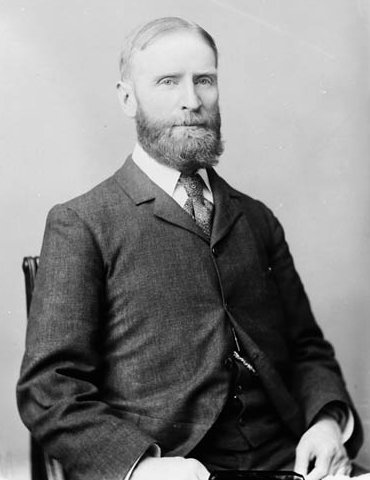

Senator for Halifax, Nova Scotia
- In office 1877–1921
- Appointed by: Alexander Mackenzie

Personal details
- Born: August 9, 1841 Halifax, Nova Scotia
- Died: September 12, 1921 (aged 80)
- Party: Liberal
- Education: Carlow College; Catholic University of Ireland; Harvard University
- Occupation: Lawyer, Politician
- Portfolio: Speaker of the Senate

Lawrence Geoffrey Power, PC (August 9, 1841 – September 12, 1921) was a Canadian lawyer and politician.

Born in Halifax, Nova Scotia, the son of Patrick Power and Ellen Gaul, he was educated at St. Mary's Knockbeg College, Carlow College, the Catholic University of Ireland and Harvard University and was admitted to the bar in 1866. In 1880, he married Susan O'Leary. He served as a member of Halifax town council and of the school board. He also served as a member of the senate for Dalhousie University. Power was appointed to the Senate of Canada representing the senatorial division of Halifax, Nova Scotia in 1877. A Liberal, he was Speaker of the Senate from 1901 to 1905.

He died in office in 1921.
