= Malachy Bowes Daly =

Canadian politician (1836–1920)

The Honourable Sir Malachy Bowes Daly KCMG KC
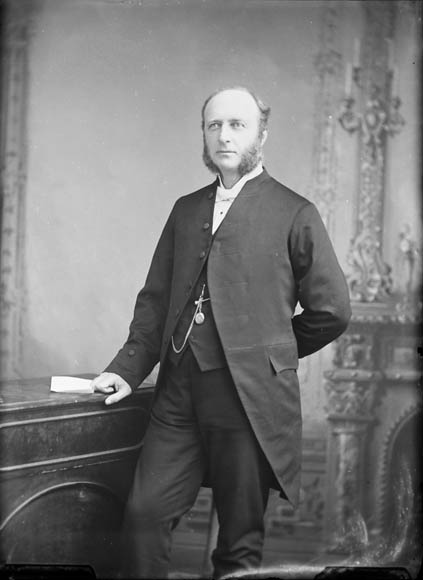

7th Lieutenant Governor of Nova Scotia
- In office July 11, 1890 – July 26, 1900
- Monarch: Victoria
- Governors General: The Lord Stanley of Preston; The Earl of Aberdeen; The Earl of Minto
- Premier: William S. Fielding; George Henry Murray
- Preceded by: Archibald McLelan
- Succeeded by: Alfred Gilpin Jones

Member of the Canadian Parliament for Halifax
- In office 1878–1883 Serving with Matthew Henry Richey
- Preceded by: Alfred Gilpin Jones; Patrick Power
- In office 1883–1887 Serving with John Fitzwilliam Stairs
- Succeeded by: Alfred Gilpin Jones; Thomas Edward Kenny

Deputy Speaker of the House of Commons (Canada)
- In office February 10, 1885 – January 15, 1887
- Preceded by: Position Created
- Succeeded by: Charles Colby

Personal details
- Born: February 6, 1836 Quebec City, Lower Canada
- Died: April 26, 1920 (aged 84) Halifax, Nova Scotia
- Party: Liberal-Conservative
- Relations: Dominick Daly (father)

Sir Malachy Bowes Daly KCMG, KC (February 6, 1836 – April 26, 1920) was a Canadian politician and the seventh Lieutenant Governor of Nova Scotia.

== Early life ==
Born in Quebec City, the son of Sir Dominick Daly, he was called to the bar in Halifax, Nova Scotia in 1864.

== Political and administrative career ==
Daly was a private secretary to his father and to three governors of Nova Scotia: Sir Richard Graves MacDonnell, Sir Charles Hastings Doyle, and Sir William Fenwick Williams.

He was elected to the House of Commons of Canada in the riding of Halifax in the 1878 federal election. A Liberal-Conservative, he was re-elected in the 1882 elections. From 1885 to 1887, he was the Deputy Speaker and Chairman of Committees of the Whole of the House of Commons. From 1890 to 1900 he was the lieutenant-governor of Nova Scotia. In the New Year Honours list January 1900, he was knighted as a Knight Commander of the Order of St Michael and St George (KCMG).

Outside politics, he was also a cricketer, playing twice for the Canada national cricket team in 1874. He also scored the first century in Canadian cricket in Halifax during the 1858 cricket season.

== Family ==
At Halifax, July 4, 1859, he married Joanna Kenny, second daughter of Sir Edward Kenny, a cabinet minister in the Sir John A. Macdonald government. On retiring from the Governorship, he, Lady Daly and their daughter, Miss Daly, were honoured by public testimonials. He was given a magnificent dressing case; Lady Daly was given a diamond star pendant and Miss Daly was given a diamond ring. Lady Daly served as a volunteer and as President of the Ladies' Auxiliary in connection with the Mission to Deep Sea Fisheries. She was an amateur actress, and performed at Government House in Nova Scotia.

== Electoral history ==
1882 Canadian federal election: Halifax
| Party | Candidate | Votes | % | Elected |
|---|---|---|---|---|
| Liberal–Conservative | M.B. Daly | 2,811 | 25.84 | ✓ |
| Liberal–Conservative | Matthew Henry Richey | 2,785 | 25.60 | ✓ |
| Independent | Alfred Gilpin Jones | 2,720 | 25.00 | |
| Liberal | H.H. Fuller | 2,563 | 23.56 | |
| Total valid votes | | 10,879 | 100.00 | |

1878 Canadian federal election: Halifax
| Party | Candidate | Votes | % | Elected |
|---|---|---|---|---|
| Liberal–Conservative | Matthew Henry Richey | 3,532 | 28.13 | ✓ |
| Liberal–Conservative | M.B. Daly | 3,466 | 27.60 | ✓ |
| Independent | Alfred Gilpin Jones | 2,863 | 22.80 | |
| Independent Liberal | Patrick Power | 2,695 | 21.46 | |
| Total valid votes | | 12,556 | 100.00 | |

== Sources ==
- "The Quebec History Encyclopedia". Claude Bélanger, Marianopolis College. Archived from the original on 2006-09-10.
