= Mather Byles Almon =

Canadian banker and government administrator (1796–1871)

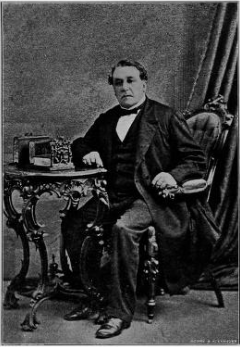
- Almon, founder of the Scotia bank
- Born: 1796; Halifax, Nova Scotia
- Died: 30 July 1871 (aged 74–75); Halifax, Nova Scotia
- Occupation: Banker
- Known for: Founder of the Bank of Nova Scotia

Mather Byles Almon (1796 – 30 July 1871) was a Canadian banker, politician, and philanthropist.

Born in Halifax, Nova Scotia, Almon was a founder of the Bank of Nova Scotia. He was president of the bank from 1837 to 1870. He also helped with the administration of Halifax and Nova Scotia, and was appointed to the legislative and executive councils of the province. Originally aligned with Tory politicians, he left the party to join the Anti-Confederation Party in 1864.

== Early life, family, and early career ==
Almon was born in Halifax in 1796. His father was William James Almon and his mother was Rebecca Byles; both were members of loyalist families. There is no record of Almon's early education.

In the 1820s, Almon established a general and wholesale firm in Halifax. He was also an insurance agent for the Halifax Fire Insurance Company and the Halifax Marine Insurance Association, the latter of which he helped to establish in 1838. He was also an agent for several British firms.

In the 1830s, he was involved in the administration of Halifax. In 1838, he was a delegate to meet Canada's new Governor-General, John Lambton, 1st Earl of Durham, as a representative of the mercantile class.

== Bank of Nova Scotia and political career ==
In 1832, Almon joined with other businessmen to establish the Bank of Nova Scotia. He was a member of the bank's first board of directors and became its president in 1837. Almon also pursued a variety of investments in the United States and several Canadian provinces. In Nova Scotia, he primarily invested in mortgages and personal loans, although he was also invested in a coal mine in Pictou County, operated by an American company, and a British firm called the Acadia Iron Company. In 1842, he was appointed as governor of Dalhousie University.

In 1843, Almon was appointed to the legislative and executive councils of Nova Scotia. This caused three members of the executive council to resign in protest, saying that Lieutenant Governor Lucius Cary was appointing too many Tory-aligned people. In 1848, he resigned from the council when the Liberals won the preceding election. In 1854, he was appointed as a governor of King's College and remained in that role until 1871 (with one year of interruption in 1868).

Almon was aligned with Tory politicians in Nova Scotia and probably contributed to their campaigns. In 1864 he separated from the party and became an anti-Confederate, supporting the new party until his death. In 1870 he resigned from the bank due to his poor health, as his eyesight was affected and he was unable to sign the banknotes.

== Personal life and death ==
Almon married Sophia Pryor on 31 January 1825. They had fourteen children, although five died at a young age.

Almon died on 30 July 1871, and was buried at St. John's Cemetery in Halifax. At his death, his estate was valued at $616,000 (equivalent to $18,805,597 in 2023).

Business positions
Preceded by William Lawson	President of the Bank of Nova Scotia; 1837–1870	Succeeded by James Donaldson
