= Almon (given name) =

Almon is a masculine given name which is borne by:

- Almon Abbott (1881–1945), Canadian prelate of the Episcopal Church and Bishop of Lexington, Kentucky
- Almon W. Babbitt (1812–1856), an early leader in the Latter Day Saint movement, Mormon pioneer and first secretary and treasurer of the Territory of Utah
- Almon Glenn Braswell (1943–2006), American business owner and convicted felon pardoned by President Clinton
- Almon M. Clapp (1811–1899), American printer and politician, first Public Printer of the United States
- Almon Cornwell (1820–1893), American farmer, politician and Wisconsin pioneer
- A. R. Meek (1834–1888), American lawyer, politician and eighth Florida Attorney General
- Almon Heath Read (1790–1844), American politician
- Almon Rennie (1882–1949), Canadian businessman and politician
- Almon Brown Strowger (1839–1902), American inventor
- Almon Swan (c. 1819–1883), American politician
- Almon Harris Thompson (1839–1906), American topographer, geologist, explorer and educator
- Almon Woodworth (1841–1908), American politician
