= John Young Payzant =

Canadian politician (1837–1920)

John Young Payzant K.C., M.A.
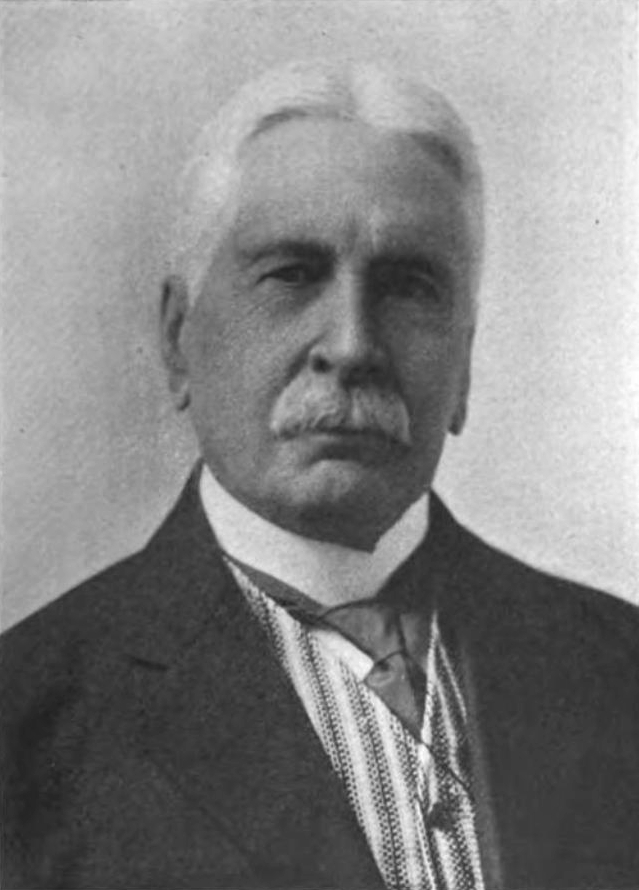

5th Mayor of Dartmouth
- In office 1881–1883
- Preceded by: James W. Turner
- Succeeded by: Alfred Cogswell

Personal details
- Born: 9 February 1837 Falmouth, Nova Scotia, Canada
- Died: 19 November 1920 (aged 83) Los Angeles, California, United States
- Spouse: Frances E. Silver (1868)
- Profession: Financier; Lawyer; Politician

John Young Payzant K.C., M.A. (9 February 1837 – 19 November 1920) was a Canadian financier, lawyer, and politician in Nova Scotia.

== Early life and education ==
John Young Payzant was born on 9 February 1837 in Falmouth, Nova Scotia, Canada. He was the son of Peter and Catherine Payzant.

His family had lived in Nova Scotia for several generations. The Payzants originally migrated from Jersey to Nova Scotia in 1754 under Governor Edward Cornwallis. John Young Payzant, whose ancestors were prominent Huguenots who fled Caen, France after the revocation of the Edict of Nantes, was also related to John Payzant.

A young Payzant received his education at Horton Academy and Acadia College in Wolfville. He graduated from Acadia in the class of 1860. Following the completion of his B.A., he went on to receive his M.A. in 1863.

== Career ==
After graduating, he went to Halifax, Nova Scotia. Payzant was admitted to the Nova Scotia Bar on 7 December 1864. He studied and worked in law with the late Hon. James William Johnston, who was later appointed as a judge in equity of the Nova Scotia Supreme Court. Payzant partnered with J.W. Johnston in Johnston & Payzant from 1864 to 1876, then practiced independently until 1895, after which he and his son William Payzant formed the firm John Y. Payzant & Son from 1895 to 1897. In addition to his legal practice, he operated a large conveyancing and real estate business and acted as solicitor for the Nova Scotia Building Society, which had extensive operations in Halifax.

John Young Payzant was appointed Accountant General of the Nova Scotia Supreme Court on 12 August 1869, following the death of Charles Twining. His responsibilities included handling all funds deposited with the court and ensuring their proper management and distribution. As a safeguard, he provided a £1,000 security bond to the Crown. He was compensated with a commission of 10% on funds invested in the bank and 5% on mortgages or other securities. Each year, he was required to submit a detailed financial report, verified under oath, to the prothonotary at Halifax for review and audit.

Sworn in on 4 May 1881, he was appointed as the warden (title changed to Mayor in 1889) of the City of Dartmouth. Serving two terms as the city's 5th mayor, his tenure ended in 1883.

In 1883, he began lecturing on the law of Torts at Dalhousie Law School. By the 1888–89 term, Payzant remained on the academic staff of Dalhousie College as a lecturer.

In the by-election of the General Assembly of Nova Scotia held on 20 August 1884, he made his political debut, representing the Conservative Party in opposition to William Stevens Fielding. Although Fielding was elected, his party nominated him again at the 1886 Nova Scotia general election and the Dominion election of 1887.

In 1890, he worked as a solicitor for the Nova Scotia Savings and Loan Company. That year, Payzant was named King's Counsel. By February 1895, he was elected as a member of the Royal Nova Scotia Historical Society.

Payzant became a well-regarded expert in the world of finance. He held seven shares in the Bank of British North America in 1888, valued at $350. By 1898, his holdings in the Bank of British North America had grown to 77 shares, worth $3,850. Payzant was appointed vice president of the Bank of Nova Scotia (now Scotiabank) in 1897. Serving as president from 1899 to 1918, he led the Bank of Nova Scotia for nearly two decades. In December 1902, Payzant laid the cornerstone of the new Bank of Nova Scotia Building in Toronto.

He served on the Halifax School for the Blind's Board of Directors by 1898. By 1912, he had taken on several significant roles. Maintaining his role as a director of the Halifax School for the Blind, he was also a director of the Joint Benevolent Co. In addition, he served as vice president of Stanfield's Ltd., Eastern Trust Company, Halifax Electric Tramway Company, the Nova Scotia Telephone Company, and the Trinidad Consolidated Telephone Company. Along with his other responsibilities, he was president of the Bank of Nova Scotia, Empire Trust Company, Nova Scotia Fire Insurance Company, and the Halifax Archaeology Institute, and also served as a trustee of the Halifax Y.M.C.A.

In 1918, he retired from the presidency of the Bank of Nova Scotia as the oldest bank president in Canada. Prior to stepping away from business, he was president of the Bank of N.S., Empire Trust Co., N.S. Fire Insurance Co., and N.S. Telephone Co., while also directing multiple philanthropic organizations.

== Personal life ==
On 27 August 1868, Payzant married Frances E. Silver. Frances was the daughter of a Halifax dry goods merchant named William Chamberlain Silver. They had five sons and three daughters. John Young Payzant was a member of the Halifax Club, a conservative in politics, and an Anglican in faith.

Around 1900, Payzant resided at 81 South Park Street (now 1173 South Park Street) in Halifax. His summer residence was in Bayscote, Queens County, Nova Scotia.

== Death ==
John Young Payzant died at 84 years old on 19 November 1920 in Los Angeles, California, United States.
