= Stephen Tobin =

Canadian merchant and politician (1836–1905)

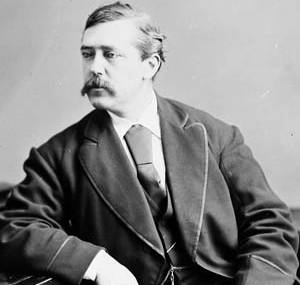
Stephen Tobin Source: Library and Archives Canada

Stephen Tobin (1836 – October 10, 1905) was a Canadian merchant and political figure. He represented Halifax in the House of Commons of Canada from 1872 to 1874 as a Liberal member.

He was born in Halifax, Nova Scotia, the son of Thomas S. Tobin and grandson of Michael Tobin. He was educated in England. Tobin ran unsuccessfully for a seat in the Nova Scotia Assembly in 1867. In 1868, he married Katharine Grey. Tobin served as mayor of Halifax from 1867 to 1870 and from 1878 to 1881. He was Danish consul at Halifax. Tobin also served as a commissioner of public schools. He died in Montreal at the age of 69.

1872 Canadian federal election: Halifax
Party	Candidate	Votes	%	Elected
Liberal–Conservative	William Johnston Almon	2,528	25.55	✓
Liberal	Stephen Tobin	2,486	25.12	✓
Independent Liberal	Patrick Power	2,452	24.78	
Independent	Alfred Gilpin Jones	2,430	24.56	
Total valid votes		9,896	100.00	
Source: Canadian Elections Database
