= Patrick Power (Canadian politician) =

Canadian politician (1815–1881)

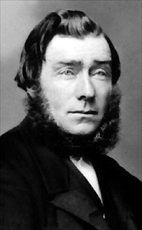

Member of the Canadian Parliament for Halifax
- In office 1867–1872 Serving with Alfred Gilpin Jones
- Succeeded by: William Johnston Almon; Stephen Tobin
- In office 1874–1878 Serving with Alfred Gilpin Jones
- Preceded by: William Johnston Almon; Stephen Tobin
- Succeeded by: Matthew Henry Richey; Malachy Bowes Daly

Personal details
- Born: March 17, 1815 Kilmacthomas, County Waterford , United Kingdom of Great Britain and Ireland
- Died: February 23, 1881 (aged 65) Halifax, Nova Scotia, Canada
- Party: Anti-Confederate (1867-1869); Liberal Party of Canada (1869-1870); Independent Liberal (1870-1878)
- Children: Lawrence Geoffrey Power

Patrick Power (March 17, 1815 – February 23, 1881) was a Canadian politician and a Member of Parliament for the riding of Halifax in Nova Scotia. He was born on March 17, 1815, at Kilmacthomas in County Waterford, Ireland. He immigrated to Nova Scotia in 1823 with his parents and later worked as a merchant in Canada.

He was first elected as a member of the Anti-Confederation Party on September 20, 1867. On January 30, 1869, he became a member of the Liberal Party, but in 1870 he became an Independent Liberal. He ran for re-election and lost on October 12, 1872. He was re-elected to the 3rd Canadian Parliament on January 22, 1874, but he was defeated in the next election on September 17, 1878.

In 1876, he was offered a position in Alexander Mackenzie's Cabinet to replace Thomas Coffin, but he declined. Ill since 1877, he retired from politics following his electoral defeat in 1878 and died on February 23, 1881. During life, he worked on various boards and commissions themed with the education and welfare of the poor. For his charity work, he was awarded the Order of St. Gregory the Great by Pope Pius IX in 1870. His son, Lawrence Geoffrey Power, was a member of the Senate. The Patrick Power Library at St. Mary's University in Halifax bears his namesake.

== Electoral history ==
1878 Canadian federal election: Halifax
Party	Candidate	Votes	%	Elected
Liberal–Conservative	Matthew Henry Richey	3,532	28.13	✓
Liberal–Conservative	Malachy Bowes Daly	3,466	27.60	✓
Independent	Alfred Gilpin Jones	2,863	22.80	
Independent Liberal	Patrick Power	2,695	21.46	
Total valid votes		12,556	100.00	
Source: Canadian Elections Database

1874 Canadian federal election: Halifax
Party	Candidate	Votes	%	Elected
Independent Liberal	Patrick Power	3,186	45.52	✓
Independent	Alfred Gilpin Jones	2,979	42.56	✓
Unknown	G. Robb	834	11.92	
Total valid votes		6,999	100.00	
Source: lop.parl.ca

1872 Canadian federal election: Halifax
Party	Candidate	Votes	%	Elected
Liberal–Conservative	William Johnston Almon	2,528	25.55	✓
Liberal	Stephen Tobin	2,486	25.12	✓
Independent Liberal	Patrick Power	2,452	24.78	
Independent	Alfred Gilpin Jones	2,430	24.56	
Total valid votes		9,896	100.00	
Source: Canadian Elections Database

1867 Canadian federal election: Halifax
Party	Candidate	Votes	%	Elected
Anti-Confederation	Alfred Jones	2,381	26.28	✓
Anti-Confederation	Patrick Power	2,367	26.13	✓
Unknown	John Tobin	2,158	23.82	
Unknown	S. Shannon	2,154	23.77	
Total valid votes		9,060	100.00	
Source: Canadian Elections Database
