= Chesapeake Affair =

International diplomatic incident that occurred during the American Civil War

- Part of the American Civil War
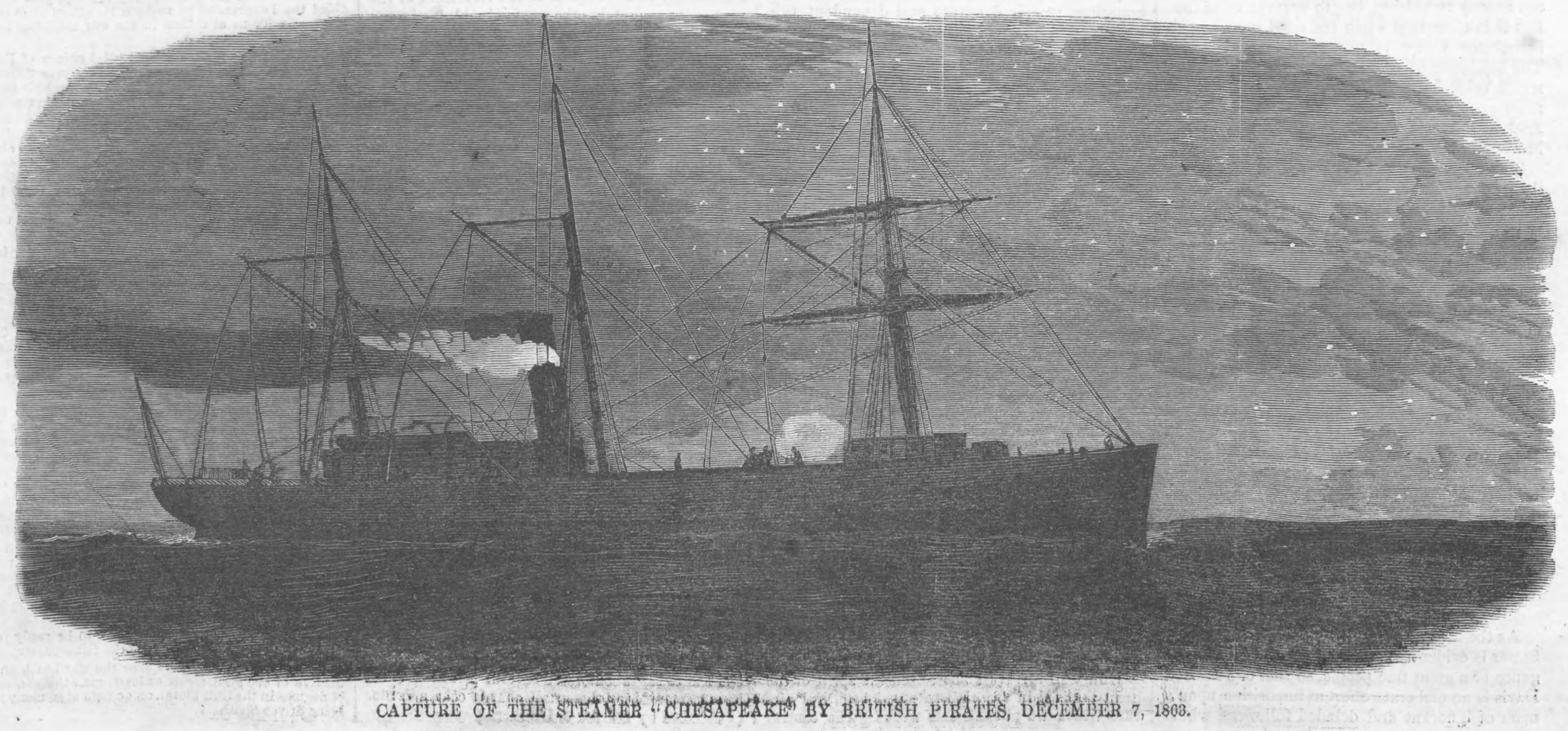
- The steamer Chesapeake, illustration from Harper's Weekly, December 26, 1863.
Date	December 7, 1863
Location	Off the coast of Cape Cod, Massachusetts
Result	Sympathizer tactical success; Union diplomatic victory

Belligerents
Nova Scotia; New Brunswick; In support of: Confederate States	United States

Commanders and leaders
James William Johnston; Samuel Leonard Tilley; William Johnston Almon; Vernon Guyon Locke	Abraham Lincoln; Edwin M. Stanton; William H. Seward; Gideon Welles

Units involved
Maritime pirates	Union Navy

Casualties and losses
None	1 killed; 3 wounded

The Chesapeake Affair was an international diplomatic incident that occurred during the American Civil War. On December 7, 1863, Confederate sympathizers from the British colonies Nova Scotia and New Brunswick captured the American steamer Chesapeake off the coast of Cape Cod. The expedition was planned and led by Vernon Guyon Locke (1827–1890) of Nova Scotia and John Clibbon Brain (1840–1906). When George Wade of New Brunswick killed one of the American crew, the Confederacy claimed its first fatality in New England waters.

The Confederate sympathizers had planned to re-coal at Saint John, New Brunswick, and head south to Wilmington, North Carolina. Instead, the captors had difficulties at Saint John; so they sailed further east and re-coaled in Halifax, Nova Scotia. U.S. forces responded to the attack, violating British sovereignty by trying to arrest the captors in Nova Scotian waters. International tensions rose. Wade and others were able to escape through the assistance of William Johnston Almon, a prominent Nova Scotian and Confederate sympathizer.

The Chesapeake Affair was one of the most sensational international incidents that occurred during the American Civil War. The incident briefly threatened to bring the British Empire into the war against the North.

== Historical context ==
While slavery had effectively ended in Nova Scotia at the beginning of the 19th century, the British ended the practice of slave-owning throughout its Empire by the Slavery Abolition Act 1833. When the Civil War began, most Canadians and Maritimers were overtly sympathetic to the North, which had abolished slavery after the Revolution and which had trading ties. At the beginning of the war, approximately 20,000 men from British North America, almost half of them Maritimers, crossed the border to fight, primarily for the North. Many families had strong kinship ties across the border with people in New England, New York and some of the Midwest.

As the war went on, relations between Britain and the North became strained for numerous reasons, and sympathy turned toward the South. Britain declared itself neutral during the war. Increased trade went through Halifax to both Northern and Southern ports. Nova Scotia's economy thrived throughout the war. This trade created strong ties between Halifax and merchants from both the North and South. In Halifax the main commercial agent for the Confederacy was Benjamin Wier and Co. – a company that flew the Confederate flag outside its office and accepted Confederate currency. The informal headquarters for the Confederates was located at the Waverley Hotel, 1266 Barrington Street (present-day Waverley Inn). At the same time, Halifax became the leading supplier of coal and fish to the North.

While trade with the South was flourishing, the North created a naval blockade to prevent supplies getting to the South. Hundreds of blockade runners loaded with British arms and supplies would use the port of Halifax to ship their goods between Britain and the Confederate States. Much of the coal and other fuels used to run Confederate steamers went through Halifax. Halifax's role in arms trafficking for the South was so noticeable that the Acadian Recorder in 1864 described the city's effort as a "mercenary aid to a fratricidal war, which, without outside intervention, would have long ago ended." U.S. Secretary of State William H. Seward complained on March 14, 1865:

Halifax has been for more than one year, and yet is, a naval station for vessels which, running the blockade, furnish supplies and munitions of war to our enemy, and it has been made a rendezvous for those piratical cruisers which come out from Liverpool and Glasgow, to destroy our commerce on the high seas, and even to carry war into the ports of the United States. Halifax is a postal and despatch station in the correspondence between the rebels at Richmond and their emissaries in Europe. Halifax merchants are known to have surreptitiously imported provisions, arms, and ammunition from our seaports, and then transshipped them to the rebels. The governor of Nova Scotia has been neutral, just, and friendly; so were the judges of the province who presided on the trial of the Chesapeake. But then it is understood that, on the other hand, merchant shippers of Halifax, and many of the people of Halifax, are willing agents and abettors of the enemies of the United States, and their hostility has proved not merely offensive but deeply injurious.

Immediately following the 1863 Chesapeake Affair, Seward notified the Canadian government that:

The recent shipment of one thousand rifles [by pro-Confederate British sympathizers] from New York to Halifax in violation of military regulations, the recently discovered plans of Confederate 'pirates' at Halifax to capture other American steamers between New York and Halifax, the plans of 'neutral passengers' to carry forbidden and treasonable mails to the insurgents and the plans of 'neutral merchants' to carry war supplies.

Canadians and Maritimers became fearful of the power that the North demonstrated in defeating the South, and worried that it might want to annex British North America next. Toronto, Montreal, St. Catharines, and Halifax were centers of a well-financed network of Confederate spies, escaped prisoners, and soldiers of fortune who were trying to influence government opinion in the war. The Confederates arranged various attacks on the Union from Canada, such as the raid on St. Albans, Vermont. The plan to kill President Abraham Lincoln was made in the St. Lawrence Hall hotel in Montreal. The Chesapeake Affair was the result of a plan created in Saint John, New Brunswick, by Confederate sympathizers: they intended to capture an American ship and use it as a blockade runner for the South.

== Capture ==
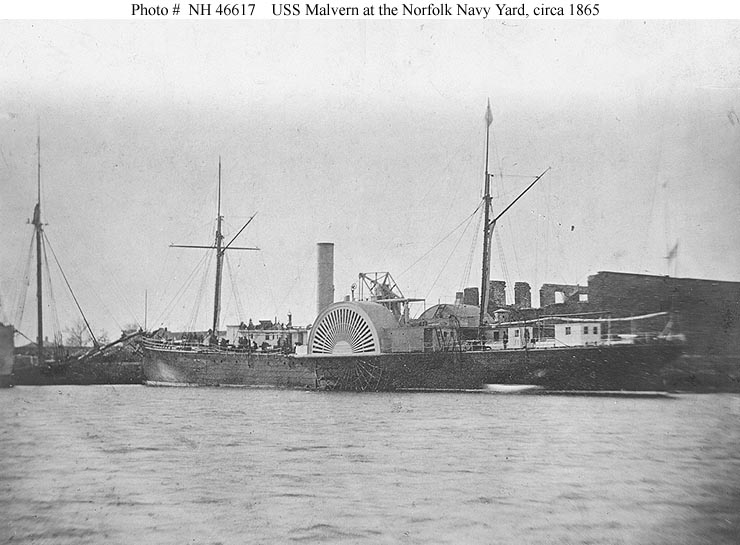
USS Malvern

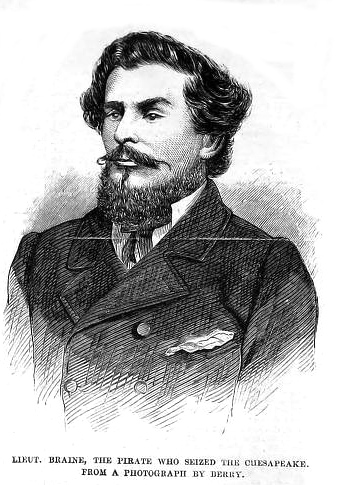
John C. Braine

Locke had arranged for John C. Braine and sixteen Confederate sympathizers from Nova Scotia and New Brunswick to board the Chesapeake as normal passengers in New York. The Chesapeake's Captain Willett later testified he remembered Braine as well as a man called H.C. Brooks, First Lieutenant Henry A. Parr, navigator Robert Osbourne and sailing master George Robinson, but did not recognize the name Robert Clifford when put to him. Daniel Henderson further testified the attackers included James McKinney and David Collins. Engineer James Johnstone further identified George Wade, Treadwell, two men named Moore and Galbraith Cox and Robert Cox, and elaborated that Lieutenant Parr informed him he had been in the Confederate Army and captured as a prisoner of war but been released, and that he had accompanied Braine on a scouting mission aboard the Chesapeake a month earlier in preparation. A Saint John resident named Charles Watters testified that he knew Linus Seely from Carleton County, New Brunswick, as well as knowing McKinney, and saw them with Braine and the two Coxes meeting at a workshop on Main Street near Charlotte Street – and understood them to have met with Captain Parker and Robinson as well on the subject of such an attack. Captain Parker did not partake in the initial attack, but took control of the ship at Saint John and took it to Dipper Harbour and onward to Halifax. Captain Parker's actual name was Vernon G. Locke, a native of Nova Scotia who moved to Fayetteville, North Carolina, when young and began calling himself Captain John Parker. Others named include George Sears, George Moore, Robert Moore, William Harris, James Kenny and George Wade.

John Ring and James Trecartin, also of Carleton County, testified they were at the meeting with Watters, McKinney and Seely and also saw Braine producing the letter of marque from Jefferson Davis authorizing them to capture US merchant ships.

While en route to Maine, on the night of 7 December, just off the coast of Cape Cod, Braine and his men seized control of the vessel. The crew resisted; in the exchange of gunfire that took place, the ship's second engineer Orin Schaffer,was killed, and three crewmen were wounded. After seizing the vessel, Locke took command at Grand Manan Island.

Neutrality regulations forbade the bringing of prizes into British waters. Locke sailed Chesapeake to Saint John, New Brunswick, as planned but was unable to load coal for the voyage south. He next took Chesapeake to Nova Scotia. Chesapeake stopped at Shelburne (10 December) and at Conquerall Bank, Nova Scotia, on the LaHave River (14 December), where they loaded some coal. During the next two days, they sold some of the stolen cargo for supplies.

In the meantime, two Union warships were closing in: the fast side-wheeler USS Malvern, moving south from Halifax, and the USS Dacotah, coming north from Shelburne.

Chesapeake was nearly caught by Malvern on the LaHave River. Under the cover of night, Chesapeake turned all lights out and slipped behind Spectacle Island and out on the LaHave without being detected. Chesapeake again avoided capture at Lunenburg and traveled on to Halifax. The vessel moved through Mahone Bay. At St. Margarets Bay, some crew left the ship. By 16 December, the ship arrived at Mud Cove harbour at Sambro. Once there Locke went to Halifax overland. There he arranged for a schooner come to Sambro with coal. While Chesapeake was being loaded with coal, Malvern and Dacotah arrived.

== Arrest ==
Upon the arrival of the American warships, most of the rebel prize crew on Chesapeake fled. Lieutenant Nickels of Malvern violated British sovereignty and international laws by arresting the three men who remained: one from New Brunswick and two from Nova Scotia. George Wade, who had killed a crew member during the raid, was among the prisoners. The Americans took Chesapeake to Halifax to get clearance for their actions from the British authorities. Chesapeake arrived in Halifax on 17 December, escorted by the two American warships. Three other warships followed, which had also pursued Chesapeake: USS Acacia, USS Cornubia, and USS Niagara.

News of the capture and the fact that Maritimers were the assailants resulted in widespread anger in the North. The New York Herald condemned the attack as the "most daring and atrocious on record" and the assailants for showing "cold blood and feeble circulation of reptiles." Another paper derided the citizens of Saint John as "mere pimps" of Confederate President Jefferson Davis and "his fellow traitors."

Seward informed Britain that the U.S. wanted Chesapeake returned immediately, and the hijackers arrested and extradited to the U.S. in accordance with Article 10 of the 1842 Webster–Ashburton Treaty, which provided the extradition of "all persons who, being charged with the crime of murder ... or Piracy".

== Escape ==
A terrible retribution awaits this city of Halifax for its complicity in treason and piracy.

— Reverend Nathaniel Gunnison, U.S. Consul at Halifax, December 24, 1863

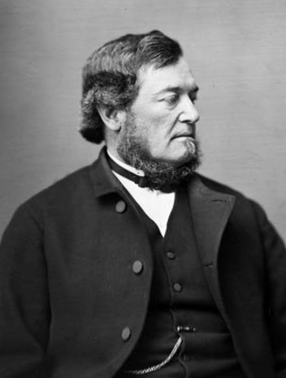
William Johnston Almon

William Johnston Almon was generally regarded as the unofficial Confederate consul in Halifax. He constantly harboured Confederate "refugees" and hosted numerous prominent Confederate officials, who were automatically welcomed at Rosebank during their stay in town. He was a friend and correspondent of Confederate President Jefferson Davis. Lewis Hutt had been instructed to await the sheriff releasing George Wade on the dock and re-arrest him for the United States, and stood waiting on the dock with the warrant in his left and pistol in his right hand; however, the sheriff asked him to wait two or three minutes before re-arresting Wade during which time Wade slipped away onto a boat which began departing. As Hutt moved to intercept and take Wade into custody, Alexander Keith Jr. and two others physically restrained him.

The fate of the Chesapeake awaited adjudication in the colonial Admiralty court, but the British planned to give Confederate prisoner Wade to the United States authorities for extradition. Almon and Keith arranged for Wade's escape in a rowboat to Ketch Harbour and to Hantsport. The Americans were outraged and, in response, the British put a warrant out for the rest of his crew. A few of the crew were tried but were found not guilty on a technicality.

== Aftermath ==
The Southern sympathisers believed they were engaging in an act of war because they had an official letter of marque from the Confederacy, but it was condemned as an act of piracy by most of the newspapers in the Maritimes.

Many high-ranking Confederates settled in Canada after the war. Approximately 30 senior Naval and Army officers from the South settled in Halifax. Among the most prominent were John Wilkinson (commander of CSS Chickamauga), Thomas Edgeworth Courtenay, and John Taylor Wood.

== See also ==
- Military history of Nova Scotia
