= Conquerall Bank, Nova Scotia =

Community in Nova Scotia, Canada

Coordinates: 44°21′54.35″N 64°28′0.28″W

Conquerall Bank in Nova Scotia

Conquerall Bank is a community in the Canadian province of Nova Scotia, located in the Municipality of the District of Lunenburg in Lunenburg County. The community was involved with the Chesapeake Affair during the American Civil War.

In 1967 the citizens of the community incorporated a volunteer fire department as their centennial project.

Since October 2000, the municipal representation is by councillor Martin Bell.
