= Almon Woodworth =

American politician

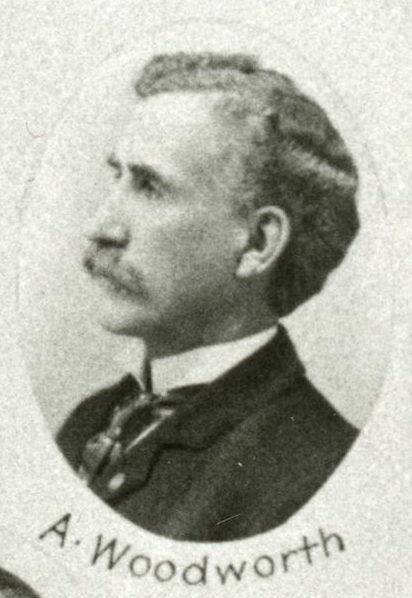
- Woodworth in 1895

Member of the Washington House of Representatives from the 35th district
- In office January 9, 1893 – January 11, 1897
- Preceded by: W. D. Tyler
- Succeeded by: Calvin S. Barlow

Personal details
- Born: April 1841 Union, Pennsylvania, U.S.
- Died: October 5, 1908 (aged 67) Tacoma, Washington, U.S.
- Party: Republican

Almon Woodworth (April 1841 – October 5, 1908) was an American politician in the state of Washington. He served in the Washington House of Representatives from 1893 to 1897.
