= The Week (Canadian magazine) =

Canadian literary magazine (1883–1896)

The Week was a seminal literary magazine in Canada published between 1883 and 1896. It was subtitled as Canadian Journal of Politics, Society and Literature, and it was "Canada's leading political and literary periodical". The magazine was headquartered in Toronto. Prominent contributors included poet Charles G. D. Roberts; journalist and novelist Sara Jeannette Duncan; and political critic and intellectual Goldwin Smith. Smith also edited the magazine.
