= Almon, Georgia =

Unincorporated community in Georgia, U.S.

Coordinates: 33°37′09″N 83°55′20″W

Almon is an unincorporated community in Newton County, in the U.S. state of Georgia.

== History ==
A post office called Almon was established in 1886, and remained in operation until 1931. The community derives its name from Thomas J. Almond, an early postmaster.
