= USS Dacotah =

Gunboat of the United States Navy

History

United States
- Name: USS Dacotah
- Launched: 23 March 1859 by Norfolk Navy Yard
- Commissioned: 1 May 1860
- Decommissioned: circa 26 July 1869
- Fate: Sold 30 May 1873 at Mare Island Navy Yard

General characteristics
- Type: Sloop-of-war
- Tonnage: 996
- Draft: 14 ft 8 in (4.47 m)
- Propulsion: Sail, with steam engine backup
- Speed: 11 kn (13 mph; 20 km/h)
- Armament: 1 × 100-pounder rifle; 4 × 32-pounder guns; 1 × 10 in (250 mm) gun; 1 × 12-pounder rifle; 1 × one 12-pounder gun

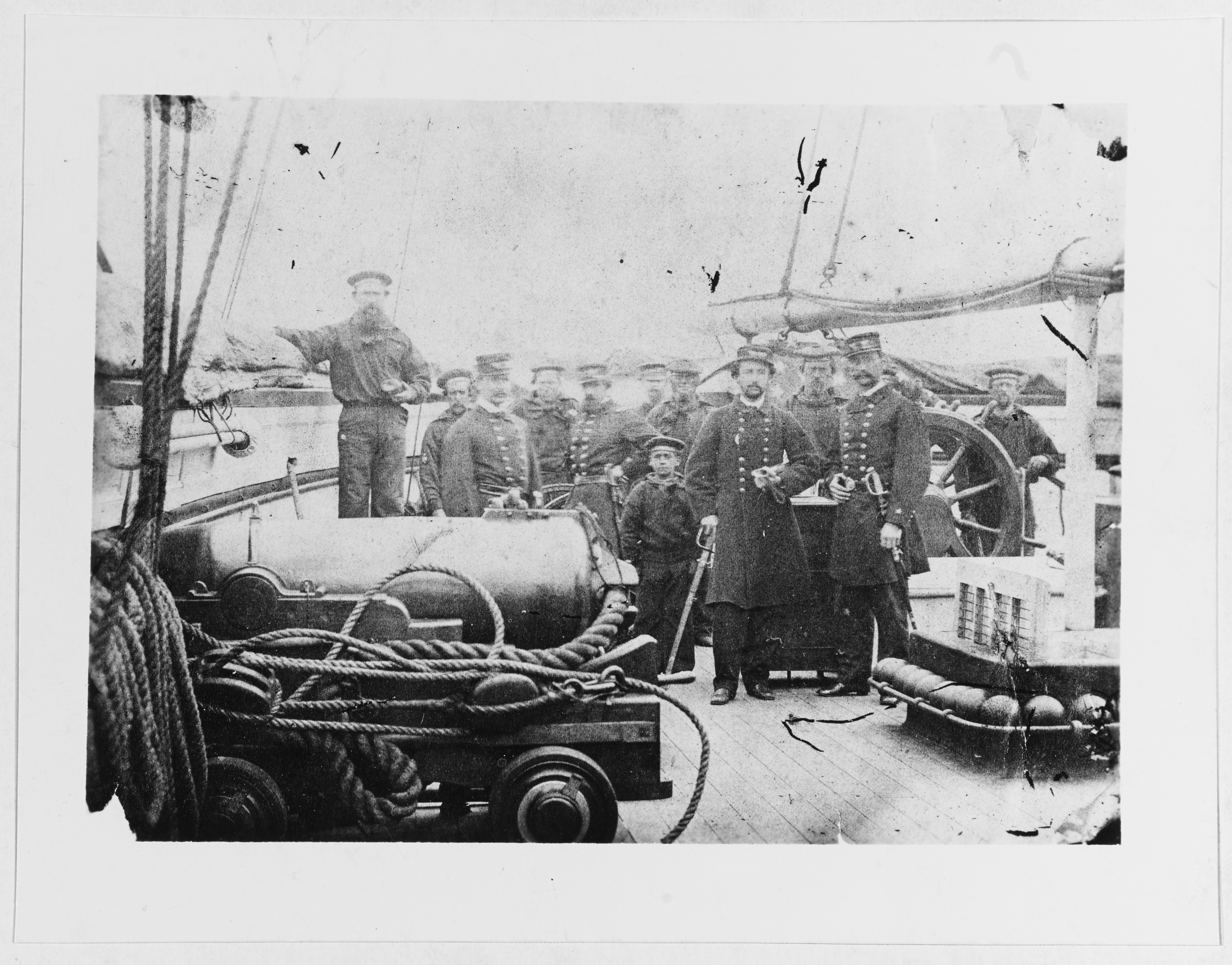
William Radford on board the Dacotah in Java c. 1861

USS Dacotah – the only United States Navy ship to be so named – was a large (996 long tons (1,012 t)) steam sloop that served the United States Navy in the Atlantic Ocean as well as in the Pacific Ocean. When the American Civil War occurred, Dacotah assumed the role of a gunboat in the Union blockade of the Confederate States of America.

When the war was over, Dacotah – who was named for the American Dakota tribe – resumed her role protecting American interests worldwide by showing her presence in both the Atlantic and Pacific Oceans.

== Service history ==
Dacotah was launched on 23 March 1859 by Norfolk Navy Yard and commissioned on 1 May 1860, Commander W. Radford in command. Sailing from Norfolk, Virginia on 30 June 1860, Dacotah rounded the Cape of Good Hope, and arrived at Hong Kong on 8 January 1861 to join the East Indian Squadron. She cruised off China until returning to Hong Kong on 14 June. On 6 August, she sailed for home and arrived at St. Thomas, Virgin Islands on 21 November for two weeks of patrolling before arriving at New York City on 20 December.

Out of commission from 31 December 1861 – 25 February 1862, Dacotah sailed on 9 March to join the North Atlantic Blockading Squadron. She served in the waters around Hampton Roads, Virginia from 13 March-14 September except for a cruise to New Orleans, Louisiana in May–June to carry messages to Flag Officer David Farragut. From 19 July, she was assigned to the James River Flotilla. She had several skirmishes with the Confederates including those in which a company of her sailors and marines, destroyed a Confederate battery of 11 guns at Harden's Bluff, Virginia on 2 July, and one of 15 guns at Day's Point, Virginia the next day. Ordered to Nassau, Bahamas on 4 September to search for the Confederate privateers Alabama and Florida, she patrolled off the Bahamas until 1 November, when she was sent to search further northward to Newfoundland and Nova Scotia.

She joined the blockading forces off Wilmington, North Carolina on 8 December and served there until 11 June 1863, when she stood out for Baltimore, Maryland and repairs to her boilers. Returning to the blockade on 15 September she was ordered into quarantine at New York City the next month when several cases of smallpox were discovered on board. During a repair period at Portsmouth, New Hampshire, she participated in the search for the captured steamer-turned-raider Chesapeake from 13 to 23 December. Dacotah departed Portsmouth on 28 January 1864 to rejoin the North Atlantic Blockading Squadron at Beaufort, North Carolina, serving there until 2 August, when she sailed for Boston Navy Yard and overhaul. Out of commission from 19 August 1864 – 29 May 1865, she cruised in the West Indies from 13 June until her arrival at Philadelphia Navy Yard on 31 August.

Dacotah put to sea from Philadelphia, Pennsylvania on 27 January 1866 for a voyage to the Pacific, calling at Funchal, Madeira, Rio de Janeiro, Montevideo, and, after passing through the Straits of Magellan, at Valparaíso. Following duty off the coasts of South and Central America, Mexico, and California until 26 July 1869, Dacotah remained in an inactive status until sold at Mare Island Navy Yard on 30 May 1873.
