= Thomas Edward Kenny =

Canadian politician (1833–1908)

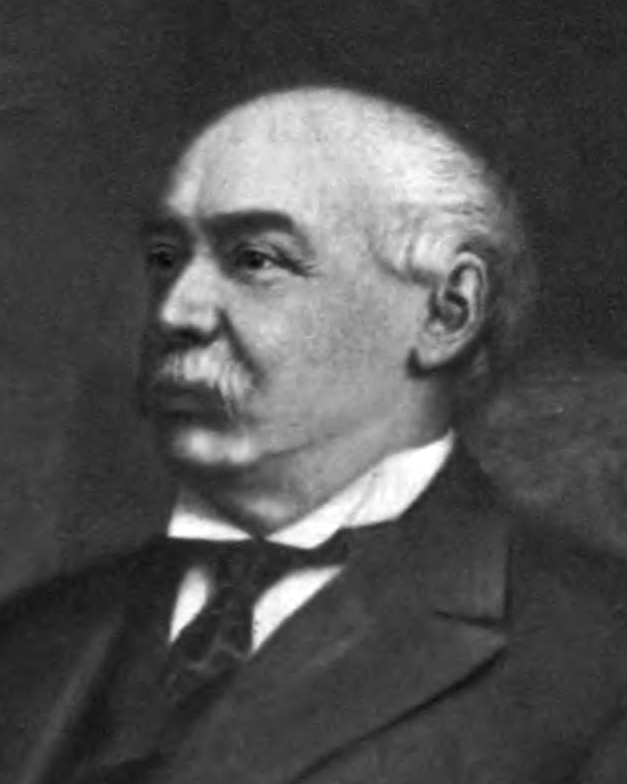
- Born: 12 October 1833; Halifax, Nova Scotia
- Died: 25 October 1908 (aged 75); Halifax, Nova Scotia
- Education: Stonyhurst College
- Spouse: Margaret Jones Burke (m. 1856)

Thomas Edward Kenny (12 October 1833 – 25 October 1908) was a merchant and political figure in Nova Scotia, Canada. He represented Halifax in the House of Commons of Canada from 1887 to 1896 as a Conservative member.

He was born in Halifax, the son of Edward Kenny and Ann Forrestall, and was educated at Stonyhurst College and the Collège Saint-Servais. On his return, he entered the family dry goods business, taking over its operation around 1870. At one time, Kenny was part-owner of 18 ships; he sold his shares in several and expanded into manufacturing, becoming involved in sugar refining and cotton. In 1856, he married Margaret Jones Bourke, a descendant of the Dutch American Roosevelt and Schuyler families. He was a member of the Halifax Chamber of Commerce and president of the Merchant's Bank of Halifax (later the Royal Bank of Canada). He ran unsuccessfully for reelection to the House of Commons in 1896 and 1900. Kenny died in Halifax at the age of 75.

== Electoral history ==
1900 Canadian federal election: Halifax
Party	Candidate	Votes	%	±%	Elected
Conservative	Robert Borden	5,705	25.67	-0.86	✓
Liberal	William Roche	5,577	25.09		✓
Conservative	Thomas Edward Kenny	5,562	25.03	+0.88	
Liberal	William B. Wallace	5,380	24.21		
Total valid votes		22,224	100.00		
Conservative hold		Swing		+0.02	
Liberal hold		Swing		-0.02	
Source(s) "Halifax (1867- )". History of Federal Ridings Since 1867. Library of Parliament. Two members were elected from the district.

1896 Canadian federal election: Halifax
Party	Candidate	Votes	%	Elected
Conservative	Robert Borden	6,170	26.53	✓
Liberal	Benjamin Russell	5,997	25.79	✓
Conservative	Thomas Edward Kenny	5,616	24.15	
Liberal	Michael Edwin Keefe	5,472	23.53	
Total valid votes		23,255	100.00	
Source(s) "Halifax (1867- )". History of Federal Ridings Since 1867. Library of Parliament. Two members were elected from the district.

Canadian federal by-election, 11 February 1892
Party	Candidate	Votes	Elected
Conservative	Thomas Edward Kenny	acclaimed	✓
Conservative	John Fitzwilliam Stairs	acclaimed	✓
Called upon election being declared void

1891 Canadian federal election: Halifax
Party	Candidate	Votes	%	Elected
Conservative	Thomas Edward Kenny	5,274	27.69	✓
Conservative	John Fitzwilliam Stairs	5,262	27.63	✓
Liberal	Alfred Gilpin Jones	4,335	22.76	
Liberal	Edward Farrell	4,174	21.92	
Total valid votes		19,045	100.00	

1887 Canadian federal election: Halifax
Party	Candidate	Votes	%	Elected
Liberal	Alfred Gilpin Jones	4,243	25.53	✓
Conservative	Thomas Edward Kenny	4,181	25.15	✓
Conservative	John Fitzwilliam Stairs	4,099	24.66	
Liberal	H.H. Fuller	4,098	24.66	
Total valid votes		16,621	100.00	
