= William Bruce Almon =

Nova Scotian physician and politician

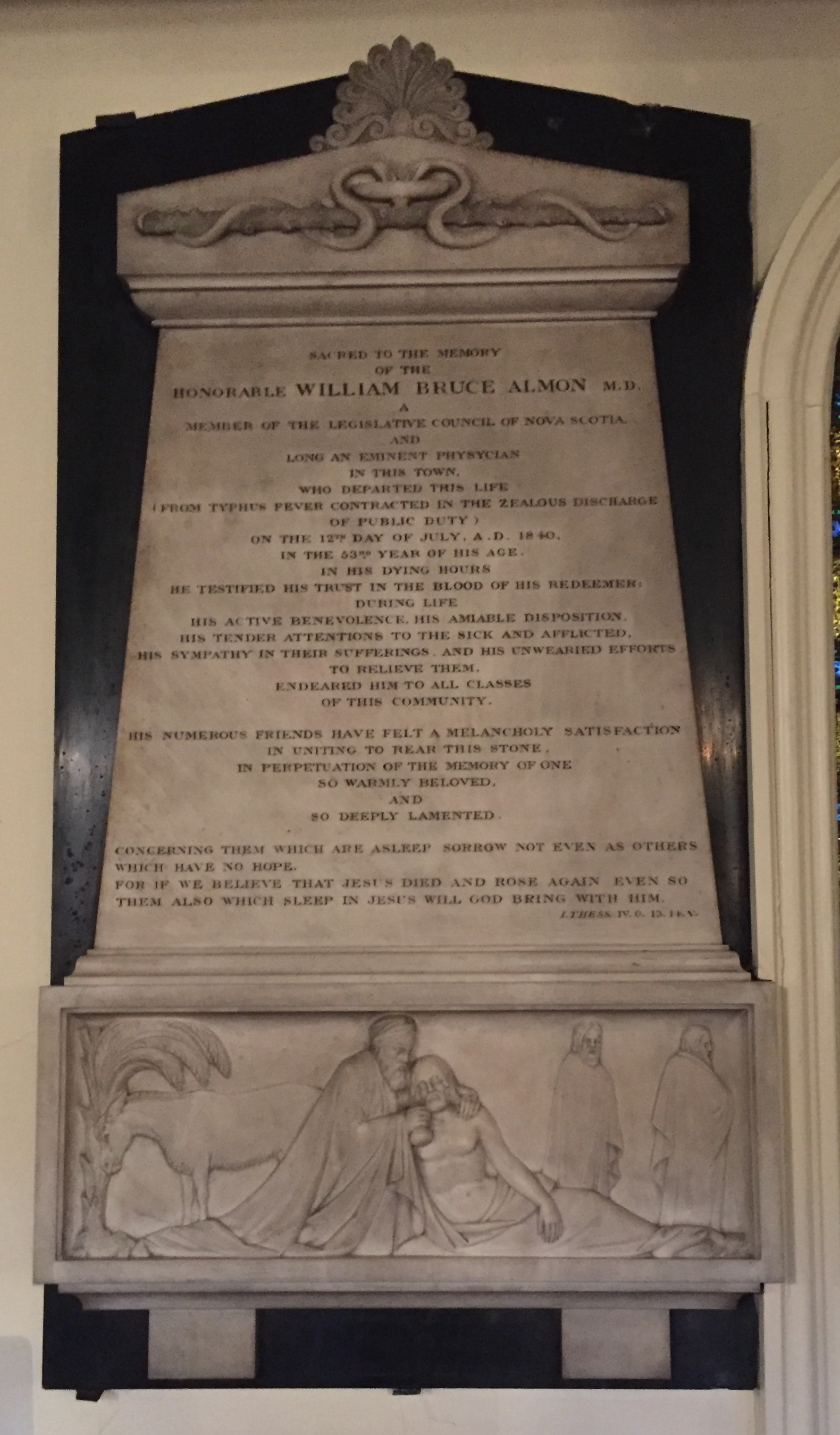
William Bruce Almon monument by Samuel Nixon (sculptor) (London), St. Paul's Church (Halifax), Nova Scotia

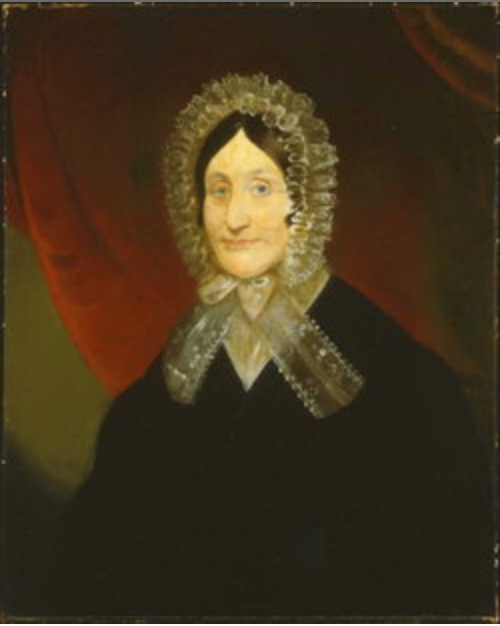
Almon's wife Laleah (1789-1869)

William Bruce Almon (25 October 1787 – 12 July 1840) was a medical doctor and politician in Halifax, Nova Scotia. He was the son of William James Almon. He went to University of Edinburgh to study medicine (1809). He was involved in caring for inmates of the jail and the poor house with his father. In the aftermath of the war of 1812, he petitioned the government for assistance for the 185 Black refugees who came to the poor house from the ship Chesapeake.

As health officer in 1840, he boarded a ship to treat passengers suffering from typhus. He contracted the disease and soon died at the age of 52. His son was William Johnston Almon.

At the base of his monument in St. Paul's Church is the parable of the Good Samaritan, in which a traveller is stripped of clothing, beaten, and left half dead alongside the road. First a priest and then a Levite comes by, but both avoid the man.

He was buried in the Old Burying Ground (Halifax, Nova Scotia).
