= William Johnston Almon =

Canadian surgeon and politician (1816–1901)

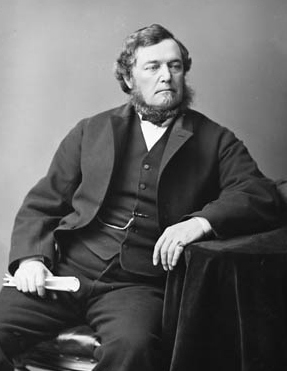
- William Johnston Almon in 1873

Senator for Halifax
- In office 15 April 1879 – 19 February 1901

Member of Parliament for Halifax

Personal details
- Born: January 27, 1816 Halifax, Nova Scotia
- Died: February 19, 1901 (aged 85)
- Party: Liberal-Conservative
- Education: University of Edinburgh, University of Glasgow
- Occupation: Physician, politician

William Johnston Almon (27 January 1816 – 19 February 1901) was a Nova Scotian physician and Canadian parliamentarian. He was the son of William Bruce Almon.

Born in Halifax, Nova Scotia, Almon received his medical education from the University of Edinburgh and the University of Glasgow. He was awarded a medical degree from the later university in 1838. By 1839, Almon had returned to Halifax and had an established a medical practice. He is noted for being among the first physicians in North America to employ chloroform as a surgical anesthetic, a procedure he first performed on 5 February 1848, within 90 days of the first-ever application of chloroform as an anesthetic by James Young Simpson in Edinburgh. Almon was also a pivotal figure in the establishment of the first hospital in Halifax, and helped found, and served three terms as president of, the Medical Society of Nova Scotia.

As an alumnus of King's College, Almon created the Welsford Testimonial (Almon-Welsford Testimonial) after the fallen Crimean War Hero (See the Welsford-Parker Monument), the President of the university presents it to the successful candidate every year.

Almon assisted in helping confederate sympathisers escape justice in the Chesapeake Affair during the American Civil War.

As a Liberal-Conservative first elected in the Canadian federal election of 1872, Almon served one term as a Member of Parliament representing the electoral district of Halifax in the province of Nova Scotia. Although he did not stand again in 1874, he was on 15 April 1879 appointed to the Senate of Canada on the recommendation of Sir John A. Macdonald. He represented the senatorial division for Halifax until his death.

== Electoral history ==
1872 Canadian federal election: Halifax
Party	Candidate	Votes	%	Elected
Liberal–Conservative	William Johnston Almon	2,528	25.55	✓
Liberal	Stephen Tobin	2,486	25.12	✓
Independent Liberal	Patrick Power	2,452	24.78	
Independent	Alfred Gilpin Jones	2,430	24.56	
Total valid votes		9,896	100.00	
Source: Canadian Elections Database

== Gallery ==
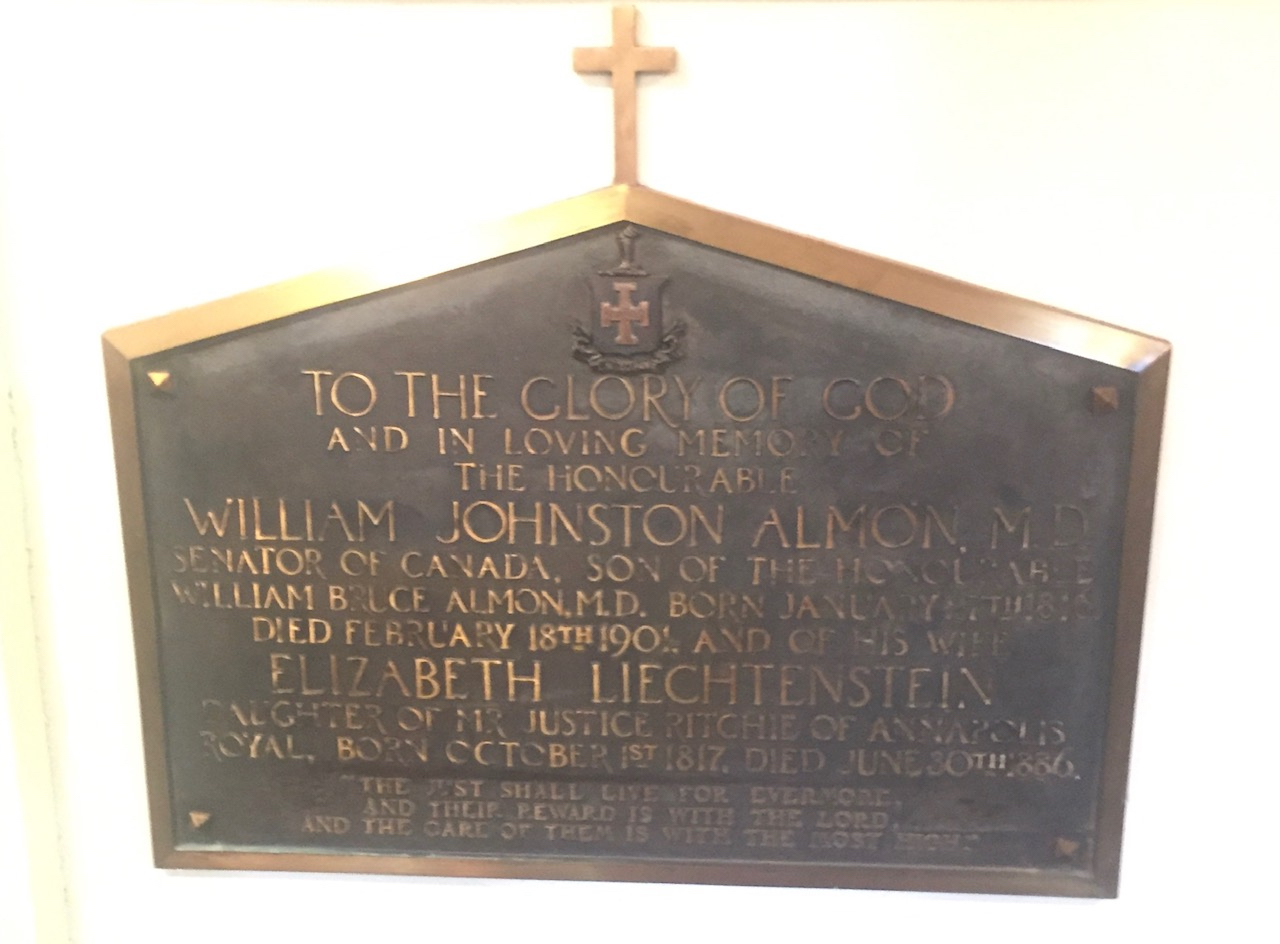
William Johnston Almon Plaque, St. Paul's Church (Halifax)

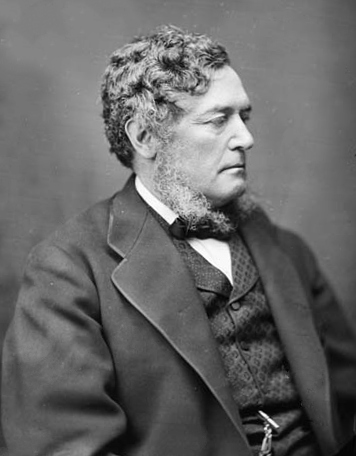
William Johnston Almon (1879)

== Legacy ==
- The Almon-Welsford Testimonial Prize, King's University
