= Jean McIlwraith =

Canadian novelist and biographer (1858-1938)

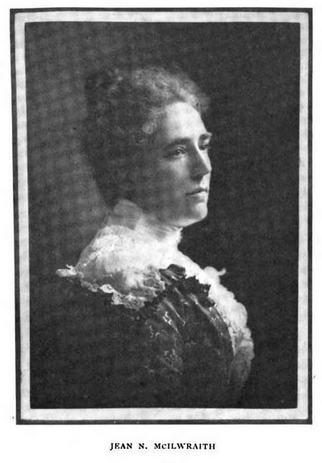
- Jean N. McIlwraith, from a 1901 publication.
- Born: December 28, 1858; Hamilton, Canada West
- Died: November 17, 1938 (aged 79); Burlington, Ontario
- Occupation: Writer (novelist)
- Writing career
- Period: 19th, 20th century
- Genres: Historical fiction, biography

Jean Newton McIlwraith (December 28, 1858 – November 17, 1938) was a Canadian novelist and biographer. Her works include children's books, 1 opera, and historical romances, such as The Curious Career of Roderick Campbell (1901), A Diana of Quebec (1912), and Kinsmen at War (1927).

== Biography ==
McIlwraith was born in 1858 in Hamilton, Canada West. Her parents were Mary Park and Thomas McIlwraith, a noted ornithologist. She attended the Wesleyan Ladies College and studied modern literature through a correspondence program with Queen Margaret College of the University of Glasgow. From 1902 to 1919 she worked in New York City for publishing companies and achieved the position of head reader at Doubleday, Page and Co. In 1919 she returned to Canada to devote her time to writing. She suffered from arteriosclerosis and died from pneumonia in Burlington, Ontario in 1938.

== Works ==
McIlwraith published one opera and several books in the genre of romance and historical fiction. She also published numerous short stories which appeared in magazines such as Harper's, Atlantic Monthly and Cornhill Magazine.

- Ptarmigan, 1895 (comic opera, co-authored with John Aldous).
- The Making of Mary, 1895 (pseud. Jean Forsyth).
- The Span o' Life: a Tale of Louisburg and Quebec, 1899
- Canada, 1900.
- The Curious Case or Roderick Campbell, 1901.
- A Diana of Quebec, 1912. A fictional account of the romantic triangle, and relationships, between Captain Robert Mathews, Miss Mary Simpson, and Horatio Nelson.
- Kinsmen at War, 1927.
