= John Fitzwilliam Stairs =

Canadian politician (1848–1904)

John F. Stairs
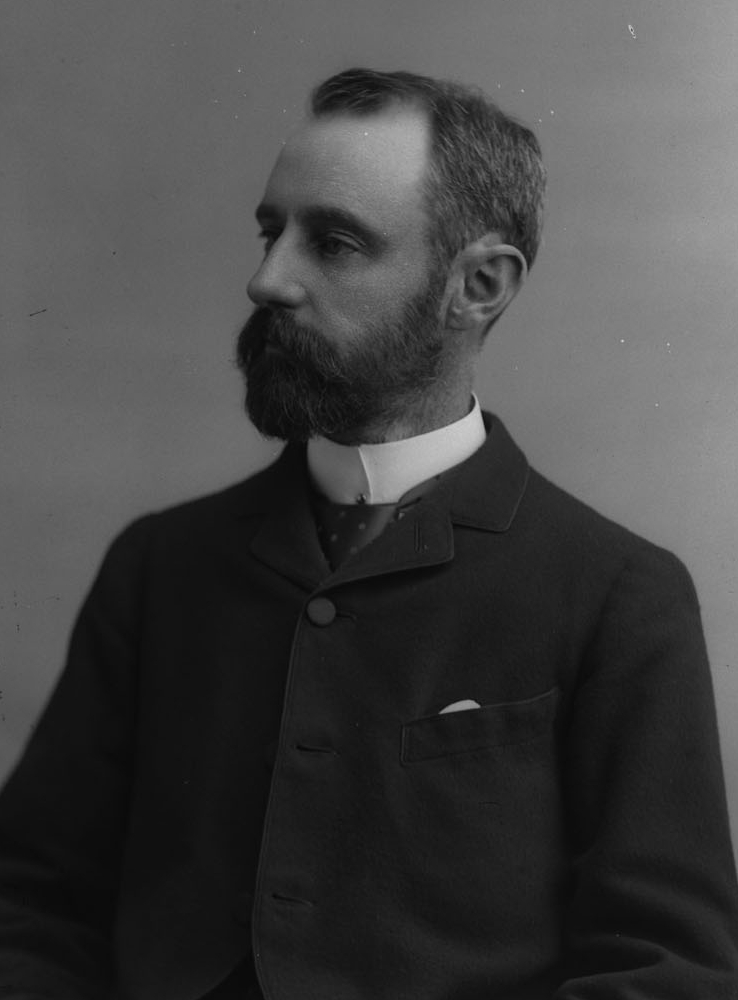
- Stairs, c. 1890
- Born: 19 January 1848; Halifax, Nova Scotia, Canada
- Died: 26 September 1904 (aged 56); Toronto, Ontario, Canada
- Occupations: Financier; Politician

John Fitzwilliam Stairs, also known as John Fitz William Stairs (19 January 1848 – 26 September 1904) was an entrepreneur and statesman, born in Halifax, Nova Scotia, a member of the prominent Stairs family of merchants and shippers founded by William Machin Stairs (1789–1865) that included the Victorian era explorer, William Grant Stairs.

Known as "John F.", he studied at Dalhousie University and then entered the management of the family's vast business empire. He was elected to the Nova Scotia House of Assembly in 1879, resigning in 1882 to successfully run for election to the House of Commons of Canada in Ottawa where he served as a Conservative Party member until 1896.

Stairs was president of many companies, including Nova Scotia Steel, Eastern Trust, Trinidad Electric (B.W.I.) and Royal Securities Corporation. He served as director of the Dartmouth and Halifax Steamboat Company, Nova Scotia Sugar Refining, the Union Bank of Halifax, Consumer Cordage, and during his lifetime, came to dominate the financial elite of the Maritime provinces.

He also employed Max Aitken (later, Lord Beaverbrook) at the beginning of Aitken's business career, hiring him in 1902 when he set up Royal Securities, the first investment firm in Eastern Canada. Max Aitken was at Stairs' bedside when he died in Toronto, Ontario. His remains were sent to Halifax where he was buried in the Fairview Cemetery.

== Electoral history ==
1896 Canadian federal election: Halifax
Party	Candidate	Votes	%	Elected
Conservative	Robert Borden	6,170	26.53	✓
Liberal	Benjamin Russell	5,997	25.79	✓
Conservative	Thomas Edward Kenny	5,616	24.15	
Liberal	Michael Edwin Keefe	5,472	23.53	
Total valid votes		23,255	100.00	
Source(s) "Halifax (1867- )". History of Federal Ridings Since 1867. Library of Parliament. Two members were elected from the district.

Canadian federal by-election, 11 February 1892
Party	Candidate	Votes	Elected
Conservative	Thomas Edward Kenny	acclaimed	✓
Conservative	John Fitzwilliam Stairs	acclaimed	✓
Called upon election being declared void

1891 Canadian federal election: Halifax
Party	Candidate	Votes	%	Elected
Conservative	Thomas Edward Kenny	5,274	27.69	✓
Conservative	John Fitzwilliam Stairs	5,262	27.63	✓
Liberal	Alfred Gilpin Jones	4,335	22.76	
Liberal	Edward Farrell	4,174	21.92	
Total valid votes		19,045	100.00	

1887 Canadian federal election: Halifax
Party	Candidate	Votes	%	Elected
Liberal	Alfred Gilpin Jones	4,243	25.53	✓
Conservative	Thomas Edward Kenny	4,181	25.15	✓
Conservative	John Fitzwilliam Stairs	4,099	24.66	
Liberal	H.H. Fuller	4,098	24.66	
Total valid votes		16,621	100.00	

Canadian federal by-election, 25 July 1883
Party	Candidate	Votes	Elected
Conservative	John Fitzwilliam Stairs	acclaimed	✓
Called upon Matthew Richey being named Lieutenant Governor of Nova Scotia, 4 July 1883
