= William James Almon =

Medical doctor and loyalist in American Revolution

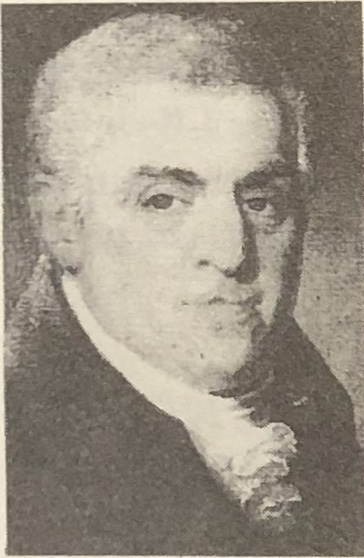
William James Almon by Robert Field (1810)

William James Almon (14 August 1755 – 5 February 1817) was a medical doctor and loyalist who left New York City for Nova Scotia during the American Revolution (1776). He is reported to have attended to the wounded at the Battle of Bunker Hill. He later served at the capture of New York City. He was the surgeon mate of the 4th battalion, Royal Artillery, which served in the Battle of Monmouth. In 1780, he returned to Halifax. He became the surgeon general of the Nova Scotia militia. His last year of practice he joined his son Dr. William Bruce Almon. Along with Duncan Clark and John Halliburton, Almon served as physician to Edward Augustus and were part of the royal social circle in Halifax.

In 1810, Almon had his portrait painted by Robert Field.

In 1816, Almon went to England to address health issues and died there. He was buried under Church of St James, Southstoke, Bath. His wife of 31 years Rebecca Byles returned to Nova Scotia.

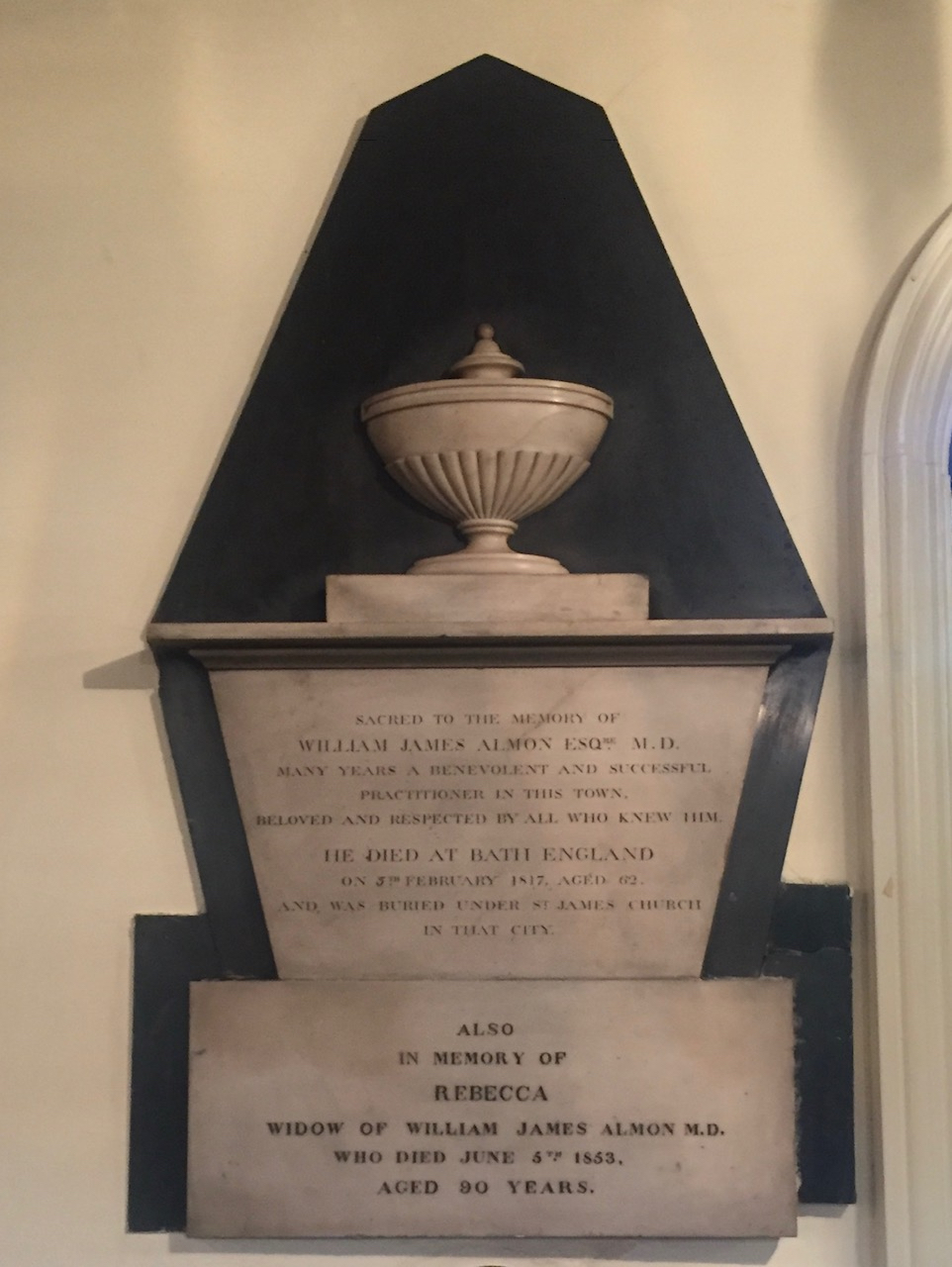
William James Almon Monument, St. Paul's Church (Halifax)

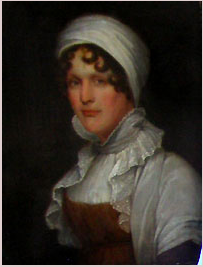
Almon's wife Rebecca Byles Almon by Robert Field; oldest child of Mather Byles

== Legacy ==
- Namesake of Almon Street, Halifax, Nova Scotia
