= Alfred Gilpin Jones =

Canadian politician (1824–1906)

The Honourable Alfred Gilpin Jones
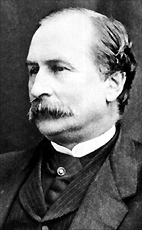

8th Lieutenant Governor of Nova Scotia
- In office July 26, 1900 – March 15, 1906
- Monarchs: Victoria; Edward VII
- Governors General: The Earl of Minto; The Earl Grey
- Premier: George Henry Murray
- Preceded by: Malachy Bowes Daly
- Succeeded by: Duncan Cameron Fraser

Personal details
- Born: September 28, 1824 Weymouth, Nova Scotia
- Died: March 15, 1906 (aged 81) Halifax, Nova Scotia
- Party: Liberal

Alfred Gilpin Jones, PC (September 28, 1824 – March 15, 1906) was a Canadian businessman, politician, and eighth Lieutenant Governor of Nova Scotia.

== Biography ==
Born in Weymouth, Nova Scotia, the son of Guy Carleton Jones and Frances Jones, he was a merchant and established his own firm, A. G. Jones and Company, in 1872.

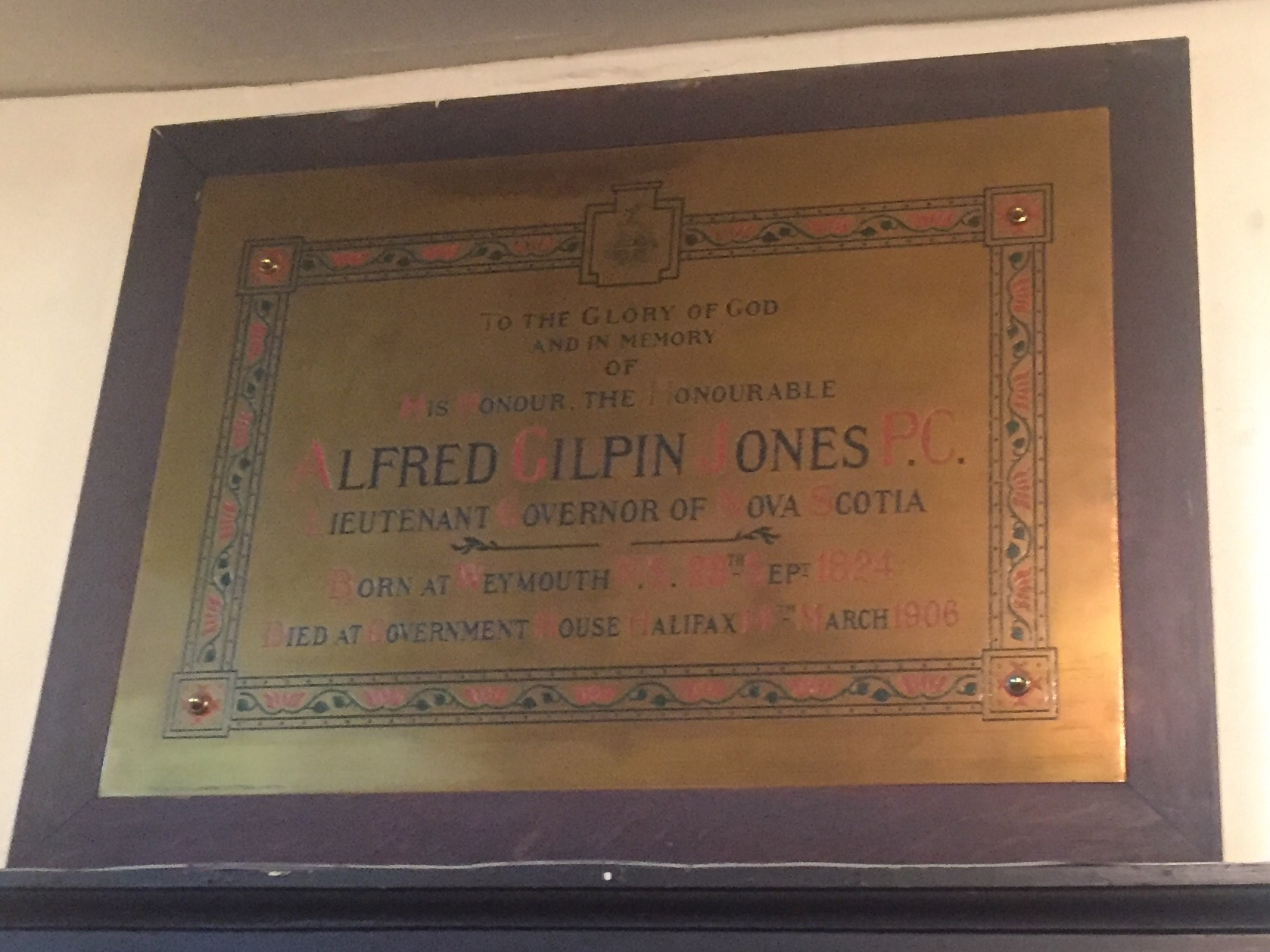
Alfred Gilpin Jones, St. Paul's Church (Halifax)

In 1867, he was elected to the House of Commons of Canada for the riding of Halifax. One of 18 members elected of the Anti-Confederation Party, he became an independent in 1869 and was defeated in 1872. He was re-elected in 1874 but was forced to resign in 1878 due to an alleged breach of the Independence of Parliament Act. He was re-elected in the resulting 1878 by-election and was appointed Minister of Militia and Defence from January to October. He was defeated in the 1878 election and in 1882. He was re-elected in 1887 as a Liberal but was defeated in 1891. From 1900 until his death in Halifax in 1906, he was the Lieutenant-Governor of Nova Scotia.

== Family ==
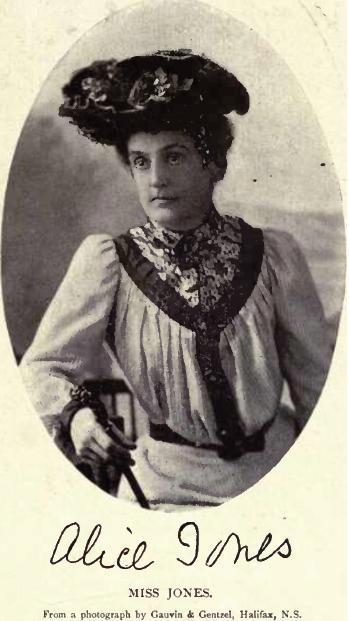
Miss Alice Jones (author) by Gauvin & Gentrel, Halifax

Jones was married twice: to Margaret Wiseman Stairs, the aunt of John Fitzwilliam Stairs, in 1850 and to Emma Albro in 1877. Jones and his first wife, Margaret Wiseman had a daughter Alice, who was a writer known under her nom de plume Alix John. Alice Jones was born and educated in Halifax, Nova Scotia, and studied languages in France and Italy. She wrote for the Toronto Week, and contributed a serial, "A Hazard of Hearts," to Frank Leslie's Monthly. She published a novel "The Night Hawk" in 1902 and "Bubbles We Buy" in 1903.

== Electoral history ==
1891 Canadian federal election: Halifax
Party	Candidate	Votes	%	Elected
Conservative	Thomas Edward Kenny	5,274	27.69	✓
Conservative	John Fitzwilliam Stairs	5,262	27.63	✓
Liberal	Alfred Gilpin Jones	4,335	22.76	
Liberal	Edward Farrell	4,174	21.92	
Total valid votes		19,045	100.00	

1887 Canadian federal election: Halifax
Party	Candidate	Votes	%	Elected
Liberal	Alfred Gilpin Jones	4,243	25.53	✓
Conservative	Thomas Edward Kenny	4,181	25.15	✓
Conservative	John Fitzwilliam Stairs	4,099	24.66	
Liberal	H.H. Fuller	4,098	24.66	
Total valid votes		16,621	100.00	

1874 Canadian federal election: Halifax
Party	Candidate	Votes	%	Elected
Independent Liberal	Patrick Power	3,186	45.52	✓
Independent	Alfred Gilpin Jones	2,979	42.56	✓
Unknown	G. Robb	834	11.92	
Total valid votes		6,999	100.00	
Source: lop.parl.ca

1872 Canadian federal election: Halifax
Party	Candidate	Votes	%	Elected
Liberal–Conservative	William Johnston Almon	2,528	25.55	✓
Liberal	Stephen Tobin	2,486	25.12	✓
Independent Liberal	Patrick Power	2,452	24.78	
Independent	Alfred Gilpin Jones	2,430	24.56	
Total valid votes		9,896	100.00	
Source: Canadian Elections Database

1867 Canadian federal election: Halifax
Party	Candidate	Votes	%	Elected
Anti-Confederation	Alfred Jones	2,381	26.28	✓
Anti-Confederation	Patrick Power	2,367	26.13	✓
Unknown	John Tobin	2,158	23.82	
Unknown	S. Shannon	2,154	23.77	
Total valid votes		9,060	100.00	
Source: Canadian Elections Database

Parliament of Canada
Preceded by None	Member of Parliament for Halifax; 1867–1872; With: Patrick Power	Succeeded by William Johnston Almon; Stephen Tobin
Preceded by William Johnston Almon; Stephen Tobin	Member of Parliament for Halifax; 1874–1878; With: Patrick Power	Succeeded by Matthew Henry Richey; Malachy Bowes Daly
Preceded by Malachy Bowes Daly; John Fitzwilliam Stairs	Member of Parliament for Halifax; 1887–1891; With: Thomas Edward Kenny	Succeeded by Thomas Edward Kenny; John Fitzwilliam Stairs
