= Halifax Mechanics' Institute =

Canadian mechanics' institute

- Successor: Nova Scotian Institute of Science
- Formation: 27 December 1831; 194 years ago
- Dissolved: 1860
- Type: Mechanics' institute
- Headquarters: Halifax, Nova Scotia
- Location: Canada

Halifax Mechanics' Institute was an educational institution in Halifax, Nova Scotia, that was established in 1831.

== History ==
Founded on 17 October 1831 by the Halifax Mechanics' Library Association, the Halifax Mechanics' Library paved the way for the creation of a mechanics' institute in Halifax, Nova Scotia. It was modelled after the mechanics' institutes founded in Glasgow and London during the early to mid-1820s.

The Acadian Recorder on 24 December 1831 invited members of the recently founded Halifax Mechanics' Library and others to meet on the 27th of December to consider establishing a mechanics' institute. Dr. William Grigor took the chair as the assembly moved, seconded, and passed the resolutions by a wide margin.

Dr. W. Grigor served as the first president, with John Leander Starr and Joseph Howe as vice-presidents, William M. DeBlois as treasurer, John Sparrow Thompson as secretary, and Robert Lawson as procurator of models and curator. Officer elections were conducted annually on the last Wednesday of December until February 1838, after which they were held on the first Wednesday in May.

The Halifax Mechanics' Institute designated the "accumulation of models and apparatus" for educational use as one of its main objectives. This encompassed models, drafts, specimens, books of reference, and other materials tending to instruction and improvement. A limited collection, mainly geological, was housed in the institute's museum that was established on Hollis Street.

In addition to collecting models and apparatus, the institute's mission was to advance science and literature among Halifax's mechanics, artisans, and broader community through public discourse and educational initiatives. The institute focused on introducing foreign mechanical advancements, promoting local inventions, and hosting a broad spectrum of lectures. Once a week, lectures were held as part of the session. These lectures, delivered by members, covered scientific topics such as magnetism, hydraulics, and hydrostatics, along with subjects like comparative anatomy, architecture, literature, fine arts, history, music, and agriculture.

At the first meeting of the Halifax Mechanics' Institute, the opening address was given by Joseph Howe (future Lieutenant Governor of Nova Scotia) on 11 January 1832. The institute began with an initial membership of 52 individuals at its opening.

George Renny Young (son of John Young) was actively involved in the Halifax Mechanics' Institute. During his 1833 visit to Great Britain, he studied similar institutions in England and Scotland, allowing him to propose improvements for Halifax. He noted that Britain's system of introductory schools greatly benefited apprentices, strongly recommended their adoption, and wanted to manage one himself.

The Halifax Mechanics' Institute hosted a lecture by Titus Smith Jr., a Nova Scotia naturalist, on the mineralogy and geology of Nova Scotia on 5 March 1834. During that year, Joseph Howe, working as a newspaper publisher and editor, released a pamphlet titled Past History and Future Prospects of the Halifax Mechanics' Institute. In September 1836, prior to being elected to the 15th General Assembly, Howe delivered an address to the institute on the moral influence of women.

The Halifax Mechanics' Institute offered a prize for the best essay on early Halifax, awarding it to Canadian historian Thomas Beamish Akins in 1839.

A building for the Mechanics' Institute was built in Dartmouth, Nova Scotia in 1845. Errol Boyd was named the curator of the museum of the Halifax Mechanics' Institute in 1847. Expanding its program, the institute introduced lectures on art appreciation, art classes, and public art exhibitions, including the 1848 loan exhibition showcasing works from local collections. It also housed a lending library for all parts of Halifax society. In 1849, Sir John William Dawson, a geologist and educator, delivered a lecture on multiple branches of natural history, including geology. Abraham Gesner, inventor of kerosene, gave lectures on geology, mineralogy, Nova Scotia's coal fields, and its natural resources.

On 28 March 1850, an act of incorporation officially established the Halifax Mechanics' Institute as a corporate entity with the power to acquire and manage property. The officers included Andrew McKinlay, Daniel McNeill Parker, Joseph Howe, George L. O'Brien, James Allen, John S. Thompson, James Forman, William Howe, Robert H. Wetmore, Thomas McCulloch, Joseph W. Quinan, Andrew Downs, James Thomson, Robert Noble, and Alexander J. Ritchie. The society's existing collections, including books, a museum, and scientific apparatus, were transferred to the corporation for its use.

The Halifax Mechanics' Institute became inactive by 1860, with its collection stored at Dalhousie College. The Nova Scotian Institute of Natural Science emerged in 1862 as the institute's successor. Nova Scotia politician William Young (son of John Young) acquired the financially troubled Halifax Mechanic's Library in 1864 and contributed its collection to create The Citizens' Free Library, Halifax's first free public library. In 1867, the museum of the Halifax Mechanics' Institute was officially transferred to the Nova Scotia Government. The contents of the defunct institute's collection were used to establish the Provincial Museum in Halifax in 1868.

== Presidents ==
- Dr. William Grigor (27 Dec. 1831 to 23 Dec. 1833)
- Joseph Howe (Dec. 1833 to Dec. 1834)
- John Leander Starr (Dec. 1834 to Dec. 1835),
- George Rennie Young (Dec. 1835 to Dec. 1837 or May 1838)
- Andrew McKinlay (from Dec. 1837 or May 1838 to May 1849)
- Dr. Daniel McNeil Parker (May 1849 to May 1852)
- Rev. Dr. Alexander Forrester (May 1852 to May 1855)
- Andrew McKinlay (May 1855 to 29 Sept. 1867)

== See also ==
- Nova Scotian Institute of Science
- Nova Scotia Museum
