= John Starr =

John Starr may refer to:

- John Starr (politician) (1775–1827), merchant and politician in Nova Scotia, Canada
- John Starr (physician), British geriatrician
- John Robert Starr (1927–2000), American journalist
- John Leander Starr (1802–1885), Canadian businessman and politician
- John F. Starr (1818–1904), U.S. Representative from New Jersey
- John Howard Starr (1898–1989), head coach of the Colgate University hockey team
- John Renshaw Starr (1908–1996), artist and SOE agent in WWII
- John Wellington Starr (1822–1856), American inventor and pioneer in development of the incandescent light bulb
- The Time Commander, a DC comics supervillain
- Pen name of writer Hugh B. Cave

== See also ==
- Jack Starr (born 1950), blues and metal guitarist. Former member of Virgin Steele
- Jack Starr (Texas guitarist), outsider musician
