= Andrew Downs (naturalist) =

American-born Canadian naturalist and taxidermist (1811-1892)

- Born: Andrew Downs; 27 September 1811; New Brunswick, New Jersey, United States
- Died: 26 August 1892 (aged 80); Halifax, Nova Scotia, Canada
- Occupations: Naturalist; Ornithologist; Taxidermist

Andrew Downs (27 September 1811 – 26 August 1892) was an American-born Canadian naturalist, ornithologist, zoologist, and taxidermist. He was the founder of Downs' Zoological Gardens and contributed to natural history collections in Nova Scotia and abroad.

== Early life ==
Andrew Downs was born on 27 September 1811, in New Brunswick, New Jersey, United States.

He was born to Robert Downs and Elizabeth Plum. After arriving in Quebec from Scotland, his father later relocated to the United States. Andrew had two siblings: a sister named Frances and a brother named Tom Downs. Growing up, Andrew often skipped school as a child to roam the woods, indulging in exploration and birdwatching.

In 1825, at age 14, he moved with his family from the U.S. to the Colony of Nova Scotia, settling in Halifax. His father, a tinsmith, occasionally took him to work, and Andrew later took up the trade to earn a living.

== Career ==
Despite beginning his career as a plumber, inheriting his father's profession, his fascination with natural history became his true calling. He dedicated himself to wildlife research, studying the natural history of birds inhabiting Nova Scotia. He developed expertise in propagation, specimen preparation, and taxidermy. His methods for preparing, preserving, and mounting birds were highly scientific.

In 1833, Downs met with John James Audubon, the famed French-American ornithologist, who had published the first volume of "The Birds of America". The two developed a lasting correspondence that continued for years.

While his early focus included ornithology, he became one of the most knowledgeable curators and breeders of large American fauna in his time. He also took an interest in breeding rare dogs such as Scottish Deerhounds, Pomeranians, Skye Terriers, and Black Russian Terriers mixed with poodles.

=== Halifax Mechanics' Institute ===
The self-taught naturalist was appointed to the governing committee of the Halifax Mechanics' Institute in 1835. Downs advocated for Halifax to establish a park, museum, and library focused on natural history in November 1838. He became assistant curator of the Institute's natural history collection in May 1845 and was promoted to curator the following year, overseeing a diverse selection of birds, insects, and minerals.

=== Downs' Zoological Gardens ===
In 1847, Downs established Downs' Zoological Gardens, known as the "first zoo in America north of Mexico," on five acres of land at the head of the Northwest Arm outside Halifax. It was considered the first of its kind in the Americas since the Aztec civilization under Aztec Emperor Moctezuma II in Mexico. Downs' zoological grounds received many distinguished guests, including the Prince of Wales (future King Edward VII), Admiral Henry Seymour, Sir Richard Grant the explorer, Lord Lucius Cary, 10th Viscount Falkland and Lady Amelia Cary, Viscountess Falkland, Prince Jérôme Bonaparte, and King Victor Emanuel's daughter, Princess Maria Clotilde.

=== Great Exhibition of 1851 ===
At the 1851 Great Exhibition at the Crystal Palace in London, England, his exhibit of stuffed Nova Scotian birds won a bronze medal.

His reputation soon expanded to reflect his expertise in advancing poultry breeding and promoting acclimatization in Nova Scotia. Recognizing the demand for better domestic poultry in foreign markets, he requested a legislative grant to improve his poultry stock in 1853. The committee for game preservation reviewed Downs' petition, toured his property, admired his birds, and valued his breeding efforts. Acknowledging its advantages, they secured $100 to aid Downs in developing Nova Scotia's poultry breeds. Downs proposed annual flower and poultry shows to the Nova Scotia Assembly that year to boost livestock quality. He joined the executive committee for the first exhibition in Halifax in October 1853. He won 11 prizes for geese, ducks, and a variety of poultry imported from England. He rejoined the executive committee in 1854 and won nine prizes as an exhibitor. He also earned awards for the best stuffed bird collection, best taxidermy specimens, and second-best insect collection.

From England, Downs received an extensive selection of living birds in 1856, including pheasants, ducks, and fowls. With additional funding that year, he adapted the English pheasants for local conditions and introduced Chinese sheep to the province. Campbell Hardy of the Royal Artillery credited Downs with introducing both the English pheasant and the Canadian red deer to Nova Scotia.

Seeking to introduce an aquarium to his gardens, he appealed to the Nova Scotia Legislature in 1860. The idea was endorsed with a recommendation that he receive a $200 grant to support the project. Downs appeared in John Matthew Jones's 1860 article, Notes on Certain Species of Nova Scotian Fishes. It was printed in The Canadian Naturalist and Geologist by the Natural History Society of Montreal. The mention highlighted Downs' discovery of a spotted wrymouth near Halifax's Commercial Wharf on 14 June 1860.

When the Prince of Wales visited his gardens in August 1860, he admired the California quails, leading Downs to send six to Windsor, England.

=== 1862 International Exhibition ===
After receiving a rat that was "taught to draw a small cart" and a saw-whet owl from George Piers, Downs stuffed the two specimens and dispatched them to the 1862 International Exhibition in London. That year, he also exhibited a stuffed bull moose, a case of the province's game birds, and a case of Nova Scotia's wild ducks. He secured a bronze medal for his contributions at the exhibition, which was held from May to November.

=== Professional and Scientific Network ===
Andrew Downs was a fellow or corresponding member of many natural history societies in Europe and America. Named a corresponding member of the London Zoological Society in 1862, he donated to the society's menagerie and often exchanged with influential people in the community. He had collaborative or collecting relationships with several notable naturalists and scientists of his time including Charles Waterton, John James Audubon, George Augustus Boardman, Spencer F. Baird, H.G. Torre, Thomas Blakiston, Col. William Chearnley, and Arthur Crichton. He was admitted to the Nova Scotian Institute of Natural Science on 5 February 1863 as an ordinary member. He actively participated in meetings for many years, sharing his research on ornithology through four published papers.

By 1863, he had doubled the size of his wildlife reserve to 100 acres. The grounds encompassed woodland, rock, and streams. The site, which included a greenhouse, aviary, and aquarium, developed extensively due to Downs' rising stature and consistent government support. In 1863, Central Park officially opened a zoological collection to the public. The opportunity to become superintendent of the Central Park Zoo came to Andrew Downs in 1864. He initially refused the offer, unwilling to abandon his own significant work.

Financially Downs depended on his skills as a taxidermist rather than on his interests as a naturalist, orinthologist, or breeder. In addition to his exhibits of birds, he stuffed and mounted moose heads. Specimens from his taxidermy work were acquired by museums and private collectors. He shipped upwards of 100 moose heads and many full specimens across the Atlantic Ocean. King Victor Emanuel II, known for his zoological enthusiasm, had Downs supply 25 moose and caribou for his acclimatization garden in Pisa, Italy.

Across America and Europe, Downs actively participated in the exchange of specimens and knowledge with major zoological institutions and museums. The naturalist also received significant support from officers of Her Majesty's Army and Royal Navy, who sent him animal specimens from wherever they were stationed around the world. Among donations arranged by British Army personnel, his personal collecting was supplemented by imports from the Zoological Society of London, and Downs' own work during three European trips in 1862, 1864, and 1867. During his 1864 tour of Europe, he was honored by nobility and scientific community, with Queen Victoria granting him passage on the HMS Mersey. Downs brought various live specimens, two glass cases of stuffed birds, and a stuffed moose to the London Zoo, exchanging for 70 specimens. During the trip he visited English naturalist and explorer Charles Waterton at Wateron's residence Walton Hall. After his return to Halifax, Downs designated his residence as Walton Cottage.

Downs, C. Hardy, and Capt. Chearnley outlined regulations in 1864 for the Nova Scotia Inland Fisheries and Game Protection Society. Chearnley had originally founded the organization, now known as the Halifax Wildlife Association. While in Halifax with the British Army, Hardy penned An Afternoon with Downs in 1864, a newspaper article describing his home and gardens. Hardy noted about Downs, "Every visitor desirous of acquaintance with wild life in the woods or by the waters of Acadie, went to Downs for advice or reference."

Downs presented his first published paper titled On the Land Birds of Nova Scotia to the Nova Scotian Institute of Natural Science on 9 January 1865. The paper included 61 different species of land birds.

Travelling to Dublin, he participated in the International Exhibition of Arts and Manufactures in 1865, winning a bronze medal.

On 26 June 1866, members of the Nova Scotia Institute of Natural Science toured his gardens, noting attractions such as a young polar bear, a seal, and deer and antelopes from South America.

=== 1867 Paris Exposition ===
At the request of Thomas Frederick Knight in 1867, he collected and shared his most recent findings on pisciculture. This was in preparation for the Paris Exhibition, scheduled for April. Downs gained insights through discussions with experts like Frank Buckland, the Inspector of British Fisheries. He returned with a chart of detailed descriptions explaining the fish propagation process.

At the 1867 Universal Exhibition held in Paris, France, the Canadian exhibitor was awarded a silver medal for his contribution of 68 stuffed Nova Scotia birds. In Illustrated London News on 24 August 1867, Charles Wyville Thomson critiqued the natural history section of the exhibition and made particular note of Downs' bird collection. Downs' collection of birds was among the exhibits purchased by the Nova Scotia commission of the Paris Exhibition. With his award-winning exhibits at events in London, Dublin, and Paris established him as a respected taxidermist both locally and internationally.

He was appointed to the organizing committee of the Provincial Agricultural and Industrial Exhibition of Nova Scotia held in Halifax in October 1868. Downs participated as a juror for the poultry class and exhibited in the natural history category. He received first prize for the "largest and best collection of stuffed birds and quadrupeds of Nova Scotia, with popular and scientific names".

=== Central Park Menagerie ===
In October 1867, Central Park Commissioners Andrew Haswell Green and Salem Howe Wales sent their wishes to have Downs made superintendent of the Central Park Menagerie. He was endorsed for the position by Spencer Baird, curator of the Smithsonian Institution. The reported salary was $3,000 per year. Downs changed his mind and, with some regret, decided to close Downs' Zoological Gardens in Halifax and sell his belongings to make the move to the United States. His land and buildings were sold for $8,000 to $10,000, and his natural history collection was auctioned off by Halifax auctioneer J.D. Nash on 28 May 1868. He donated a portion of his stuffed bird collection to the newly founded Nova Scotia Provincial Museum and relocated to New York in preparation of taking up the position of superintendent. At a meeting of the Nova Scotian Institute of Natural Science on 11 May 1868, they expressed regret and extended support in wake of the forthcoming departure of Downs.

Despite the move to New York by him and his family, a complication in the negotiation caused the proposal to fail, and American zoologist William A. Conklin was instead named director of the Central Park Menagerie. Charles Hallock, an American naturalist and publisher of Forest and Stream, claimed that "some political jugglery" prevented Downs from securing the position.

==== Return to Halifax ====
After returning to Halifax on 1 January 1869 aboard the steamer City of Cork, he settled at the corner of Inglis Street and Tower Road. He tried to re-establish his zoological garden during the period of 1869 to 1872. Denied the chance to repurchase his old land, he bought a new property in May 1869 at the North West Arm for $4,800. It was adjacent to the plot which Downs had sold and had a large aviary. The new grounds, as described by the editor of the Acadian Recorder, were "naturally more beautiful and romantic than the old place in which so many days and hours of healthy recreation were so enjoyably spent." He planned numerous innovative and refined improvements in the spring of 1870 and, after depleting his funds, turned to the Halifax City Council for financial assistance. Downs, unable to secure extra funding from the council, eventually made the decision to sell his land in July 1872.

After selling the property, Downs spent his later years in Halifax, living on North Street until 1878 before moving to 200 Agricola Street. He had an aviary connected to his residence, containing Belgian canaries, robins, linnets, cat birds, cardinals, mocking birds, Java sparrows, parrots, parroquetes, love birds, goldfinches, and doves. Financial security later came from his investments in real estate and reliable stocks. Among his real estate holdings in Halifax, Downs owned properties on Lockman Street, Cunard Street, Bauer Street, Maitland Street, North Street, and Sackville Street.

His later work centered on taxidermy, poultry, and birds, while he also supported civic projects and continued exhibiting. He stayed active in both the Nova Scotian Institute of Natural Science and the Western Halifax Agricultural Society. He presided over the Nova Scotia Poultry and Floricultural Association in October 1878. Throughout the 1880s, he utilized an annual $100 grant for the association.

Frequently attending provincial exhibitions in Nova Scotia, he contributed as an exhibitor, served as a judge, and earned awards. On 21 September 1880, he took part in the Provincial Industrial, Agricultural, Art, and Floral Exhibition of Nova Scotia, winning awards for his Polish chickens and bird collection. Constructing a square enclosure measuring nine feet on each side, he displayed a wide variety of rare and valuable foreign birds he had acquired at significant cost, including a pair of Australian Leadbeater's cockatoos.

His experience led him to the Dominion Exhibition in Halifax in 1881, where he acted as a committee member and juror.

At the 1883 International Fisheries Exhibition in London, Downs contributed to the taxidermy display of the Dominion of Canada. The exhibits showcased mammals, birds, and fish from Canadian regions, highlighting species vital to the economy and ecosystem. Specimens of preserved animals were supplied by Laval University, the Nova Scotia and Prince Edward Island governments, and both Downs and Halifax-based Thomas J. Egan. Downs' two cases contained ducks and shore birds.

He exhibited a natural history collection at the Dominion and Centennial Exhibition in Saint John, New Brunswick in October 1883. He secured first prize for his bird collection. His exhibit featured three cases: one with swimming birds like a flying mallard and a rare king eider, another with shorebirds including a scarlet ibis, a godwit, an avocet, and a black-legged stilt, and a third displaying singing birds and grouse, such as a Canada grouse with young and a hummingbird's nest, all recognized for their lifelike appearance.

When the Maritime Poultry Association was formed in Moncton in November 1884, he was appointed vice president under the presidency of H.T. Stevens. At the first annual show of the Maritime Poultry Association held in February 1885, he won first prize in the Ducks and Turkeys category for his East Indian ducks.

=== Birds of Nova Scotia ===
Downs' dedication to collecting and studying avian species was highlighted when he mounted a Meadowlark that had been taken at Halifax Harbour on 16 February 1886. On 10 May 1886, he presented a paper to the Nova Scotian Institute of Natural Science detailing the rare Labrador duck, a species that had recently been declared extinct. He addressed the Royal Society of Canada with a paper on Nova Scotia's birds and mammals in 1888. In March 1889, Downs' Birds of Nova Scotia was published, edited by Harry Piers, who led the Nova Scotian Institute of Natural Science as its president and treasurer. The catalog featured 240 bird species meticulously documented by Andrew Downs over his 66 years of active birdwatching and field studies. Notably, he secured a Northern hawk-owl in early 1889, adding it to his collection.

Downs, aged 79, built a museum annex to his residence in 1890 to preserve and display his collection, which included around 14 cases of mounted native birds.

He took charge of the Halifax carrier pigeon station on 16 August 1890, after being commissioned to train six Belgian pigeons brought from St. John, NB. He earned $100 annually, making regular visits there two to three times a week.

Downs assembled a natural history exhibit for the provincial exposition in 1891, which turned out to be his final show. Soon after, he became ill and could no longer sustain prolonged activity.

== Family ==
Mary Elizabeth Matthews, Downs' first wife, died at age 30 in 1858, leaving behind four daughters. His eldest daughter was Mary Downs. His second daughter, Annie Downs, later became the wife of R.T. Murray, deputy Queen's Printer for Nova Scotia.

Shortly after his first marriage, he married Matilda E. Muhlig on 22 June 1859, with whom he had one daughter.

== Death ==
Andrew Downs died at 81 years old in Halifax, Nova Scotia, Canada on 26 August 1892.

Downs' estate, valued at approximately $20,000, was distributed between six individuals. In February 1893, his property at Agricola and May streets—spanning 100 by 42 feet and comprising a shop, a dwelling house, and a lot of land—was advertised for sale in the Halifax Herald.

== Legacy ==
The Challenger expedition's Sir William Thompson stated he had never seen Downs' work surpassed. Following Downs' passing, Charles Hallock of Forest and Stream described an early visit with Downs in 1865 in an article titled The First American Zoo, which he published in 1893. In 1908, John W. Regan included a description of Downs in his work titled Sketches and traditions of the Northwest Arm.

Downs and his Zoological Gardens are honored with a cut stone monument located on Joseph Howe Drive (formerly Dutch Village Road) in Halifax. The site marks the entrance to his old gardens, which has been designated as a National Historic Site of Canada since 17 May 1948.

== Works ==
- On the Land Birds of Nova Scotia (1865)
- Pied or Labrador Duck (1886)
- A Catalogue of the Birds of Nova Scotia (1888)

== See also ==
- Downs' Zoological Gardens
