= John Bernard Gilpin =

American-born Canadian physician, surgeon, naturalist, author, and artist (1810-1892)

John Bernard Gilpin A.M., M.D., M.R.C.S
- Born: John Bernard Gilpin; 4 September 1810; Newport, Newport County, Rhode Island, United States
- Died: 12 March 1892 (aged 81); Annapolis Royal, Annapolis Royal County, Nova Scotia, Canada
- Other name: J.B. Gilpin
- Education: Trinity College; University of Philadelphia
- Occupations: Physician; naturalist; writer
- Relatives: William Gilpin (grandfather); Sawrey Gilpin (granduncle)

Dr. John Bernard Gilpin (4 September 1810 – 12 March 1892) was an American-born Canadian physician, surgeon, naturalist, author, and artist.

== Early life and education ==
John Bernard Gilpin Jr. was born in Newport, Newport County, Rhode Island, United States, on 4 September 1810.

His father, J. Bernard Gilpin, originally from Vicar's Hill in Hampshire, was the British Consul for Rhode Island and Connecticut, residing at Newport before retiring to Nova Scotia in 1833.

In 1831, John Bernard Gilpin studied at Washington College (now Trinity College), a private college in Hartford. He pursued medical studies with distinguished physician Dr. T.C. Gunn in Newport for a year before enrolling at the University of Pennsylvania. He received his M.D. from the Perelman School of Medicine in 1834. Gilpin completed the rest of his education in England.

== Career ==
Dr. Gilpin was recorded as a medical practitioner in Annapolis County, where he also studied natural history and local wildlife.

After passing the examination for the Royal College of Surgeons of England in 1845, he returned to Nova Scotia as one of five physicians also qualified as surgeons. He moved to Halifax, Nova Scotia, in 1846, where he maintained a medical practice on Barrington Street for four decades. Serving as assistant health officer for the Port of Pictou in 1847, Gilpin later became a member of the Medical Society of Nova Scotia in 1854.

=== Nova Scotian Institute of Science ===
One of the original founders of the Nova Scotian Institute of Science, Dr. J.B. Gilpin, was elected as a member during its inauguration on 5 January 1863. He had the privilege of delivering the first paper, "The Common Herring of Nova Scotia," at the institute's first ordinary meeting at Dalhousie College on 19 January 1863. He was appointed as vice president of the institute on 12 October 1864. In October 1866, he served as vice president alongside Lieut. Col. Campbell Hardy with John Matthew Jones in the chair. The vice president presented a paper titled "On the Mammalia of Nova Scotia—Part 3" on 5 November 1866 and the fourth and fifth editions between 1867 and 1868. His series, "On the Food Fishes of Nova Scotia," concluded with a fifth part in December 1867, and he later presented "The Walrus" on 10 May 1869. Dr. Gilpin went on to serve as the institute's president from 1873 to 1878. After his tenure, he continued to serve as a council member.

Over two decades, he wrote 34 papers published in the institute's transactions, many including his own illustrations. He illustrated his lectures with colored chalk drawings of animals. He wrote on topics such as birds, fish, walruses, moose, and fossils. Leading scientific societies in the United States held his work on Nova Scotia's birds and fishes in high regard. Regularly called upon by Dr. Spencer Fullerton Baird, curator of the Smithsonian Institution, he helped classify fish species and understand their migrations.

Upon his retirement, he took up residence in Annapolis County in 1882.

== Personal life ==
J.B. Gilpin was a descendant of Bernard Gilpin, the Oxford theologian called the "Apostle of the North." He was also related to Sawrey Gilpin, the English animal painter. His father's branch of the family came from England to America in 1783, settling in Pennsylvania before moving to Newport in 1803. He had a sister named Elizabeth Miller Gilpin.

As early as 1875, he was among the shareholders of the Bank of Nova Scotia.

His son, Edwin Gilpin, became the Dean of Nova Scotia in 1899.

== Death ==
John Bernard Gilpin died at 81 years old on 12 March 1892 in Annapolis Royal, Annapolis County, Nova Scotia, Canada. On 15 March 1892, Gilpin was interred in his family's burial ground in Annapolis Royal.

== Works ==
- Sable Island: its past history, present appearance, natural history, &c., &c. (1858)
- On the Mammalia of Nova Scotia (1866)
- On the Food Fishes of Nova Scotia (1867)
- The Walrus (1869)
- Observations on some Fossil Bones found in New Brunswick, Canada (1873–74)
