= William Grigor =

Scottish-born physician, legislative councillor, and politician (1798-1857)

The Honourable William Grigor
- Born: William Grigor; 1798; Elgin, Morayshire, Scotland
- Died: 24 November 1857 (aged 58–59); Halifax, Nova Scotia, Canada
- Education: University of Edinburgh, Licenciate of the Royal College of Surgeons of Edinburgh
- Occupations: Physician; Politician

Dr. William Grigor (1798 – 24 November 1857) was a Scottish-born medical doctor, legislative councillor, and politician.

== Early life and education ==
William Grigor was born in 1798 in Elgin, Morayshire, Scotland.

Grigor received his early education in Scotland. He studied medicine and attended lectures at the University of Edinburgh Medical School from 1814 to 1816. In 1817, he earned his qualification from the Royal College of Surgeons upon passing an exam in Edinburgh. He obtained his Doctor of Medicine from the University of Edinburgh in 1819.

== Career ==
After his studies, Grigor immigrated to the Colony of Nova Scotia, practicing in Antigonish and Truro for a few years before establishing a medical practice in Halifax in 1824.

He worked without pay as assistant to Charles Wentworth Wallace, the port of Halifax's health officer, from 1827 to 1832. To address the impact of the 1827 Halifax Smallpox Epidemic, Dr. Grigor and Dr. John Sterling founded a medical dispensary, publicized in the Acadian Recorder on 7 November 1829, to aid the poor with healthcare and medicine. The doctors Grigor and Sterling started the Halifax Visiting Dispensary in a small house on Granville Street.

Dr. William Grigor joined multiple organizations aimed at social progress and served as an early advocate and inaugural president of the Halifax Mechanics' Institute upon its creation in 1831. The doctor led the meeting on 27 December 1831, guiding discussions on the establishment of a mechanics' institute. The gathering, announced in the Acadian Recorder on 24 December, resulted in the overwhelming approval of the institute. As the first president, he worked alongside vice presidents John Leander Starr and Joseph Howe. He held the position until 23 December 1833. Nova Scotia painter William Valentine presented Dr. Grigor's portrait to the Halifax Mechanics' Institute in 1832. During the 1830s, Dr. Grigor delivered multiple lectures on art at the institute, most notably his 1836 lecture, A Philosophical View of Painting. He delivered a course of lectures on phrenology in November 1840.

The Halifax doctor was a personal physician to politician Joseph Howe. He was also a part of Howe's literary circle, the Club.

In September 1848, he was one of seven board members who were appointed to the Board of Dalhousie College (now Dalhousie University).

Alongside his large private practice and dispensary work, Dr. Grigor worked as Halifax County coroner from 1848 to 1857. His service spanned the administrations of Lieutenant Governor John Harvey and later Maj. Gen. John Gaspard Le Marchant.

On 21 February 1849, Sir John Harvey had appointed Grigor to a seat in the Legislative Council of Nova Scotia. By 1853, he was serving on the council presided over by Hon. Michael Tobin (grandfather of Stephen Tobin).

Dr. Grigor was elected president of the Halifax Medical Society (later Nova Scotia Medical Society) on 5 October 1854.

== Family ==
He married Catherine Louisa Forman on 14 April 1827. Catherine was the daughter of Halifax merchant James Pringle Forman. They had a son named John Henry Grigor.

== Death ==
William Grigor died on 24 November 1857 in Halifax, Nova Scotia, Canada.

== Legacy ==
Doctors Nova Scotia established the 'Dr. William Grigor Award' to honor the association's first president. It recognizes physicians under 50 for their impact on Nova Scotians' health.
