= Maria Morris Miller =

Canadian artist (1813–1875)

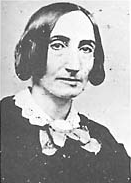
- Born: February 12, 1813; Halifax, Nova Scotia
- Died: October 29, 1875 (aged 62); Halifax, Nova Scotia
- Occupation: Artist
- Known for: Botanical lithographs
- Spouse: Garrett Miller
- Parent(s): Guy and Sybilla Morris

Maria Morris Miller (1813–1875) was a Canadian artist from Halifax, Nova Scotia who is known for her botanical paintings and illustrations. She presented her work to Queen Victoria and received royal patronage for life. She is also the first professional woman artist in Nova Scotia, recognized in her field during her active career years. She worked with scientists and government officials, garnering her accolades as the "Audubon of Nova Scotian field flowers".

== Career ==
Born into a middle class family, Miller's mother Sybilla encouraged her to learn about art. Miller studied her craft in Halifax first at a school run by Eliza Thresher on Salter Street, and later under the tutelage of a visiting British painter named L'Estrange. She also studied with W.H. Jones, a Bostonian who taught at Dalhousie College. In 1830, she began offering drawing classes to female students which gave her some financial independence. By 1833, Morris began to produce watercolour drawings of local flora with her own descriptions. The North British Society of Halifax honoured her with the title of "Painter of the Year" in 1836.

Soon after, Nova Scotia's Secretary of Agriculture and botanist, Titus Smith Jr., asked Miller to paint a series of canvases depicting local wildflowers. He brought her specimens, which she quickly had to immortalize, before the plants deteriorated. During the mid-1830s, aided by Smith's scientific input, Miller produced a large number of watercolour drawings, which later ended up in an important Halifax art exhibition in 1848.

Smith provided botanical descriptions for Miller's first catalog of coloured lithographs entitled Wild Flowers of Nova Scotia. It was issued in 1840 by a London bookseller and local publisher, with the financial support of the province's lieutenant-governor Sir Colin Campbell. A set of these prints was given to Queen Victoria, which bolstered Miller's reputation significantly.

Two other sets of lithographs followed in 1853 and 1866. The second publication was also issued as Wild Flowers of Nova Scotia. The third catalog was entitled Wild Flowers of Nova Scotia and New Brunswick and was annotated by George Lawson, a botanist who founded the Botanical Society of Canada. In 1867, the first series was reissued with a new title, Wild Flowers of British North America. With her four catalogs, Miller was able to document 22 native plants, at a time when there was an increasing interest in natural history.

In 1862, Miller participated in an International Exhibition in London, England. Although her drawings arrived too late to be part of the competition, she received positive reviews in the English press. In 1867, a copy of her botanical paintings were exhibited at the Paris Exposition.

Miller's works are part of the permanent collection at the Art Gallery of Nova Scotia, Atlantic Canada's largest art museum. Other paintings and lithographs are owned by The Nova Scotia Museum of Natural History, also located in Halifax. Ottawa's National Gallery of Canada has some of her lithographs as well, belonging to the 1840 and 1853 series.

Also a writer, Miller published a volume of poetry, Metrical Musings, with her sister Catherine in 1856.

== Personal life ==
Most records indicate that Maria Morris Miller was born in 1813 in Halifax, Nova Scotia, the daughter of Captain Guy Morris and Sibylla Amelia Maria Sophia Leggett. Her father, who was a descendant of Charles Morris, died when Maria was a small child. (She may have also been born in 1810 in Country Harbour, Nova Scotia with her mother moving the family to Halifax after her father's death in 1813.) In 1840, Maria Morris Miller married Garret Trafalgar Nelson Miller, the son of Garrett Miller and Catherine Pernette, who was the daughter of Joseph Pernette. Maria Morris Miller and her husband had five children. She died in Halifax in 1875.

== Gallery ==
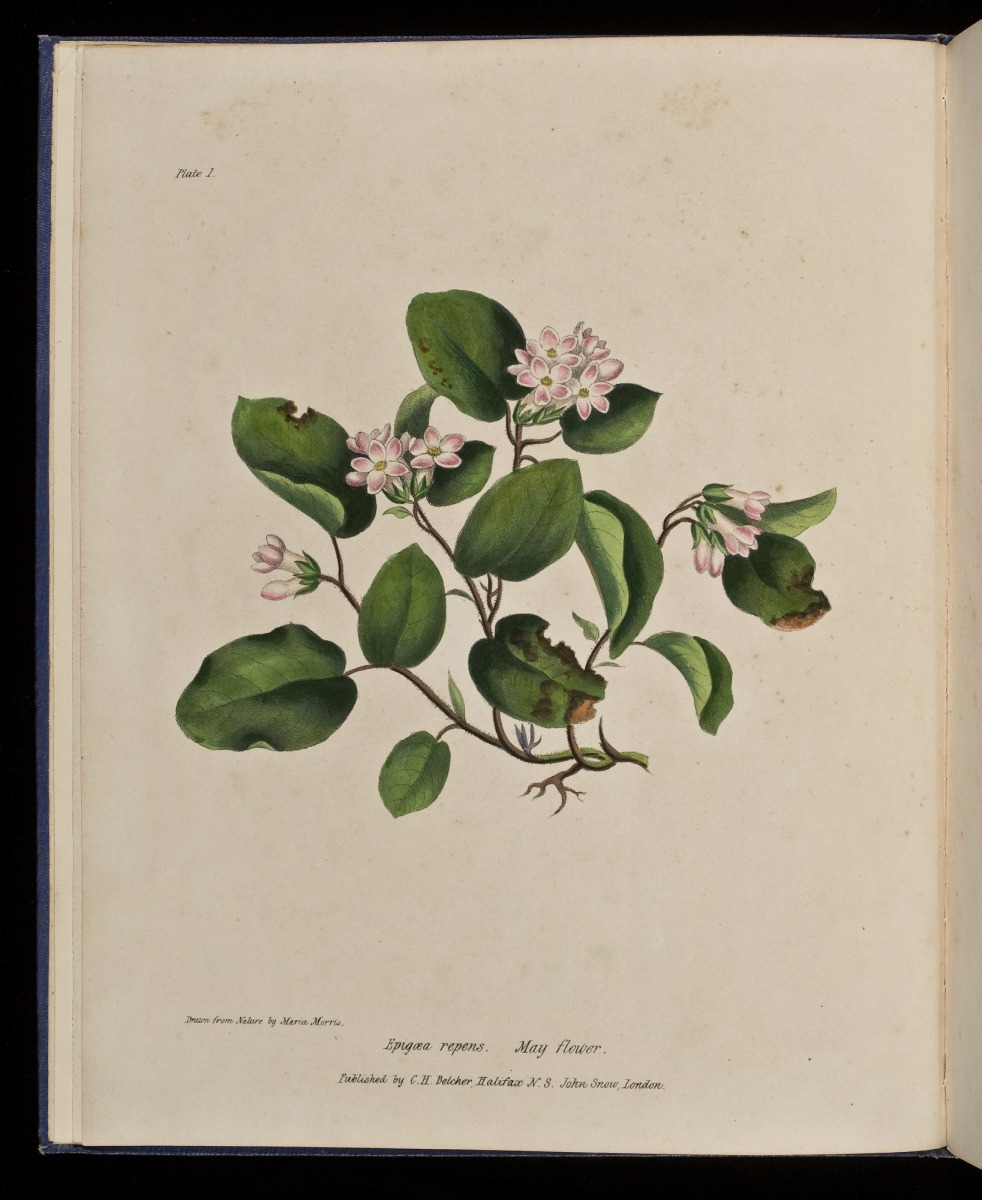
Wild Flowers of Nova Scotia: Epigaea repens. May Flower (Plate I), 1840, National Gallery of Canada

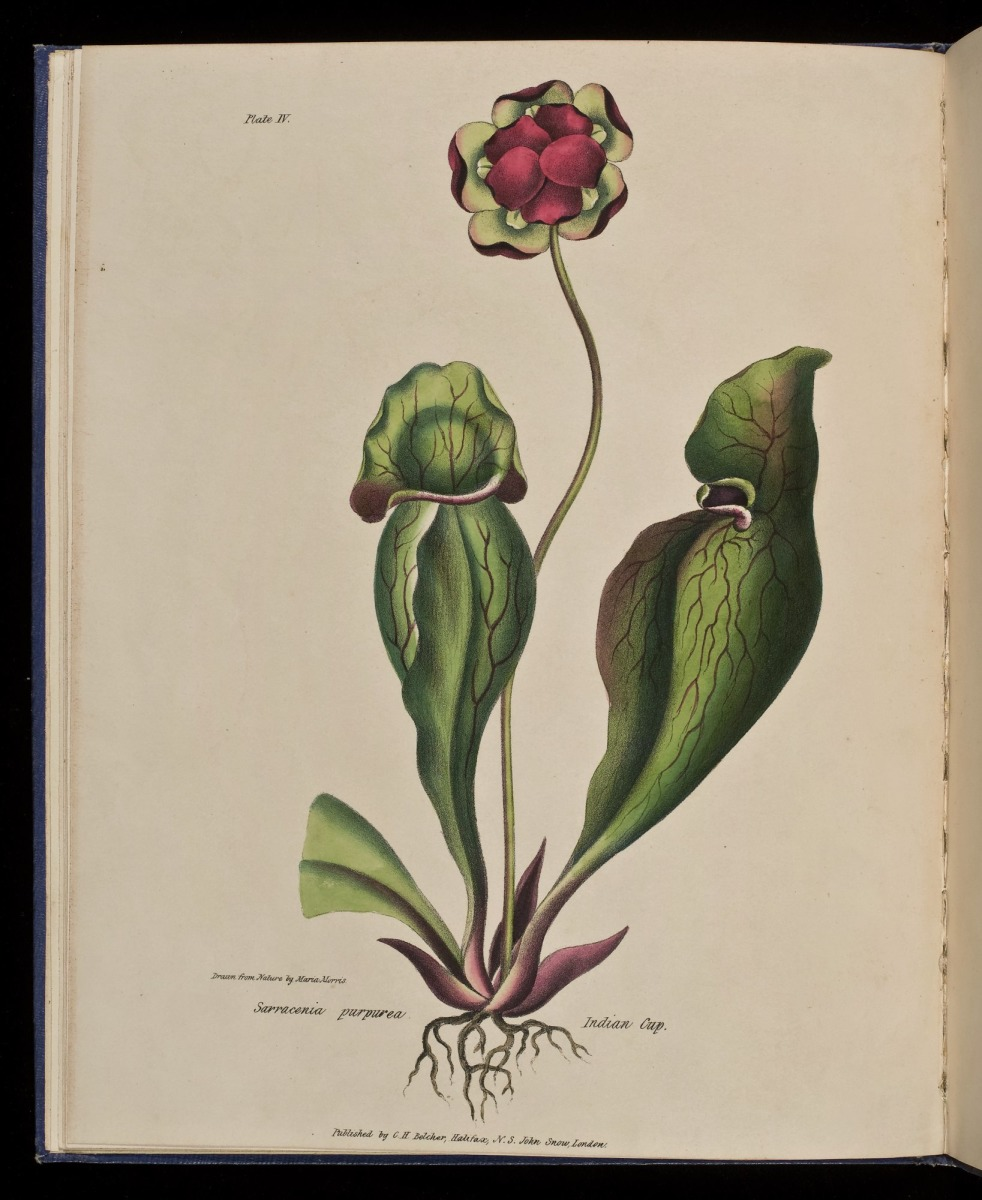
Wild Flowers of Nova Scotia: Sarracenia purpurea. Indian Cup (Plate IV), 1840, National Gallery of Canada
