= Campbell Hardy =

Campbell Hardy may refer to:

- Campbell Hardy (British Army officer) (1831–1919), British general and naturalist
- Campbell Hardy (Royal Marines officer) (1906–1984), British general
