= Garrett Miller =

Garrett Miller may refer to:

- Garrett Miller (rower)
- Garrett Miller (politician)
- Garrett E. Miller, police officer
