= Thomas Frederick Knight =

Canadian naturalist and author

Thomas F. Knight Esq.
- Born: Thomas Frederick Knight; 5 June 1828; Newfoundland, Canada
- Died: 21 May 1902 (aged 73); Bedford, Nova Scotia, Canada
- Resting place: Camp Hill Cemetery
- Occupation: Author
- Relatives: Rev. Matthew Richey Knight (son)

Thomas Frederick Knight (5 June 1828 – 21 May 1902) was a Canadian naturalist and author.

== Early life ==
Thomas Frederick Knight was born in the late 1820s in the Colony of Newfoundland. His father, Richard Knight, D.D., served as a Wesleyan Methodist minister and was assigned to the Fortune Bay circuit in 1817. Mary Hosier was his mother.

== Career ==
Knight was the author of Nova Scotia and Her Resources, a prize essay he wrote in 1862. It was published in Halifax, Nova Scotia and London by order of the Board of Provincial Commissioners for the International Exhibition. His 1862 essay was used by the provincial government's immigration department in a pamphlet titled A Hand-book of Information for Emigrants to Nova Scotia, by Joseph Outram. On the province's climate, he wrote, "The winter in Nova Scotia in its greatest severity is less uncomfortable than the humid atmosphere of this season in Britain. The climate is highly favorable to health and longevity".

Residing in Halifax, he was listed as a clerk under the Provincial Secretary J.H. Thorne in 1866.

In 1866, Thomas F. Knight compiled a treatise titled Descriptive Catalogue of the Fishes of Nova Scotia, intended to include all fish known to exist in the province's waters. That summer, he began preparing his work on the province's fisheries as a sequel to his prize essay. In the early months of the following year, he completed Shore and Deep Sea Fisheries of Nova Scotia, published by the direction of the provincial government. Knight, in his guide on the fisheries of Nova Scotia, said, "The only trade in shellfish of any importance in Nova Scotia is the lobster trade".

Ahead of Knight's trip to the Paris Exhibition in April 1867, he commissioned Halifax naturalist Andrew Downs to investigate pisciculture. On his behalf, Downs explored fish breeding methods in England and France and compiled a detailed chart on propagation. That year, Knight also published "The River Fisheries of Nova Scotia". In their 1867 report, the Committee of the House of Assembly on Fisheries recognized T.F. Knight for his valuable contributions to Nova Scotia's fishing industry. Through the publication of his two well-researched pamphlets on the fish and fisheries of Nova Scotia, Knight offered a detailed account of the nature, localities, and extent of the province's fisheries. His work was expected to stimulate increased knowledge and interest, both in Nova Scotia and internationally.

Around 1867, Thomas F. Knight was appointed as an auditor in the finance department of the Nova Scotia Government, receiving an annual salary of $1,600.

Natural History, and Its Place in the Sciences, a paper by Knight, was read to the Nova Scotian Institute of Natural Science on 8 March 1869 and published in its proceedings and transactions.

Throughout the early 1870s, he earned an income in a role as an inspector of ports. His official title in 1872 was 'Inspector of Customs' under the Dominion Civil Establishment of Nova Scotia.

== Family ==
His wife, Mary Augusta Richey, was the daughter of Wesleyan Methodist minister Matthew Richey and the sister of Canadian politician Matthew Henry Richey. Thomas Frederick and Mary Augusta had a son, Rev. Matthew Richey Knight, who was born in Halifax, Nova Scotia, on 21 April 1854.

== Death ==
Thomas Frederick Knight died on 21 May 1902 in Bedford, Nova Scotia, Canada. He was buried in Camp Hill Cemetery in Halifax.

== Works ==
- Nova Scotia And Her Resources (1862)
- The American War with Some Suggestions Toward Effecting an Honourable Peace (1864)
- Descriptive catalogue of the fishes of Nova Scotia (1866)
- The River Fisheries of Nova Scotia (1867)
- Shore and Deep Sea Fisheries of Nova Scotia (1867)
- Natural History, and Its Place in the Sciences (1869)
- Oyster Culture in France (1870)
