= Titus Smith Jr. =

American-born Canadian farmer, surveyor, botanist, author, and journalist (1768-1850)

Titus Smith
- Born: Titus Smith Jr. 4 September 1768; Granby, Massachusetts, United States
- Died: 4 January 1850 (aged 81); Halifax, Nova Scotia, Canada
- Resting place: Titus Smith Memorial Park
- Other name: The Rural Philosopher of Dutch Village
- Occupations: Farmer; Surveyor-general; Botanist
- Father: Rev. Titus Smith Sr.

Titus Smith Jr. (4 September 1768 – 4 January 1850) was an American-born Canadian farmer, surveyor, botanist, author, and journalist.

== Early life and education ==
Titus Smith Jr. was born on 4 September 1768 in Granby, Province of Massachusetts Bay.

He was the eldest child of Rev. Titus Smith and Damaris Nash (née Waite). Titus Smith's father, a Massachusetts native and Yale College graduate, was an itinerant minister with a keen interest in scholarly subjects. The younger Titus was first taught at home by his father. Titus learned to read early under his father's guidance, reading English books by age four. He was soon enrolled at a private school in New Haven, Connecticut. By age seven, he was proficient in Latin, translating its most difficult texts by twelve. He also practiced Greek, German, and French.

His mother died in 1779 at age 42, leaving four children, when he was only eleven.

Smith's father remained loyal to the British Crown during the American Revolution. At the end of the American Revolutionary War, the Smiths were among the Loyalists evacuated from New York and moved to the Colony of Nova Scotia in 1783. His family moved to a farm in the Township of Preston, west of Salmon River, in 1785, when his father assumed the role of elder at the Sandemanian church in Halifax.

In the early 1790s, Sir John Wentworth, 1st Baronet, the Lieutenant Governor of Nova Scotia, gifted the elder Titus Smith a complete collection of the botanical works of Swedish botanist Carl Linnaeus. This likely inspired both father and son's interest in botany. Wentworth had known the Smith family in New England before the revolution. While living in Preston with his father, Smith Jr. read literature, including Shakespeare, studied botany, and worked on land by clearing, felling timber, and building stone walls. He read natural history books mainly in Latin, including Christiaan Hendrik Persoon's Synopsis Plantarum and Linnaeus' Systema Naturae.

In 1796, Titus Smith Jr. moved to Dutch Village (now Fairview), west of Halifax. The area of Dutch Village was settled by emigrants from the Netherlands and Germany. After leaving Preston, he resided there for nearly 50 years.

== Career ==
At the Massachusetts Historical Society's annual meeting on 26 April 1796, Smith's letters were read. He had been corresponding with James Clarke and contributed an Indian stone arrowhead from Nova Scotia. His letters also covered geological and mineralogical subjects, including Glauber's salt, sea salt, and alum production in New Haven, along with the composition of Nova Scotia's rock formations.

As a resident of Nova Scotia, Titus Smith Jr. supported himself through farming and land surveying, a skill he developed in his twenties. Smith was commissioned as Nova Scotia's surveyor-general by Lieutenant Governor Sir John Wentworth. In 1801, he was directed by the provincial governor to carry out the first detailed survey of Nova Scotia's forests, documenting soil conditions, timber species, and notable natural history findings. Smith undertook the first of three treks into the interior, finishing them by October 1802. Over 150 days, he navigated extreme terrain with only his instructions, a compass, writing materials, the best available map, and minimal supplies he could carry on foot. The expedition was executed as instructed. Around 1805, Smith had produced a map of his travels. This map, sent to the governor with his report, was the province's only general map until 1835.

From 1802, Smith spent nearly 40 years, until about 1842, carrying out surveys across various parts of the province. Conducting provincial surveys gave him the chance to develop an extensive knowledge of the region's natural history, resources, and various aspects of the fishing industry. The colonial government of Nova Scotia appointed him Overseer of Roads four times between 1808 and 1829.

Joseph Howe granted him the title 'the Rural Philosopher of Dutch Village' in 1828, recognizing his environmental expertise and broad knowledge. Throughout his time, he corresponded with the likes of Robert Graham of Edinburgh, François André Michaux, John Claudius Loudon, among others.

In 1831, he introduced his list of principal indigenous native plants. An early plant ecologist, he experimented with acclimatizing plants grown from English seeds to his farm near Halifax.

=== Halifax Mechanics' Institute ===
In December 1831, he was among the founding members of the Halifax Mechanics' Institute and contributed as a lecturer. With a £15 grant secured from the Nova Scotia House of Assembly in 1833, he facilitated the acquisition of geological, botanical, and mineralogical specimens for its museum. Smith Jr. delivered a lecture on Nova Scotia's mineralogy and geology before the mechanics' institute on 5 March 1834.

The naturalist was almost entirely self-taught in every branch of knowledge he possessed. He also studied vegetation and theorized on fungi physiology. He presented observations titled "Conclusions on the Results on the Vegetation of Nova Scotia, and on Vegetation in general, and on Man in general, of certain Natural and Artificial Causes deemed to actuate and affect them". It was read before the mechanics' institute on 14 January 1834.

Smith supported Halifax artist Maria Morris Miller by providing specimens and contributing botanical notes to her 1840 catalog of coloured lithographs titled The Wild Flowers of Nova Scotia.

Appointed secretary of the Central Board of Agriculture (CBA) in 1841, Smith held the role until 1850 and contributed weekly agricultural articles to the Acadian Recorder. He had contributed to the newspapers and other periodicals of Halifax, for nearly 40 years, on subjects including farming practices, rural economy, education, chemistry, geology, and botany.

== Death ==
Titus Smith Jr. died on 4 January 1850 in Halifax, Nova Scotia, Canada. He had developed a case of jaundice in 1849. Smith was laid to rest in a private cemetery where Dutch settlers had also been allowed to bury their dead. His name, date of death, and age are inscribed on a granite monument.

Titus Smith Memorial Park in Fairview, Nova Scotia is the site of his grave and headstone.

== Legacy ==
On 26 June 1866, members of the Nova Scotia Institute of Natural Science visited his grave during a field meeting, where the president, John Matthew Jones, read a brief summary of Smith's life.

Eville Gorham considered Titus Smith to be one of the earliest North American ecologists.

A journal of his 1802 survey is preserved among the Nova Scotia Archives.

== Works ==
- Observations on the Country About New Haven
- Survey of the Eastern and Northern Parts of the Province in the Years 1801 and 1802 With General Observations Thereon
- Field Book of Western Nova Scotia 1801
- On the Operations of Fungi in Disintegrating Vegetable Substance (1830–31)
- A List of the Principal Indigenous Plants of Nova Scotia (1830–31)
- Conclusions on the Results on the Vegetation of Nova Scotia (1835)
- A Lecture on the Mineralogy and the Geology of Nova Scotia (1836)
