= Charles Young (administrator) =

Canadian politician (1812–1875)

Charles Young (30 April 1812 – after 1875) was a Scottish-born lawyer, judge and political figure in Prince Edward Island. He served as administrator for Prince Edward Island in 1859.

He was born in Glasgow, the son of John Young and Agnes Renny, and came to Halifax with his family in 1814. He was educated at Dalhousie College and was called to the Nova Scotia and Prince Edward Island bars in 1838. Young entered practice with his brothers William and George. He served as a member of the Legislative Council of Prince Edward Island for 23 years. In 1847, he was named Queen's Counsel. Young was the province's attorney general from 1851 to 1853 and from 1858 to 1859. He was named a judge of probate in 1852 and was a judge in bankruptcy from 1868 to 1875. Young was one of the first persons to publicly support responsible government for Prince Edward Island.
