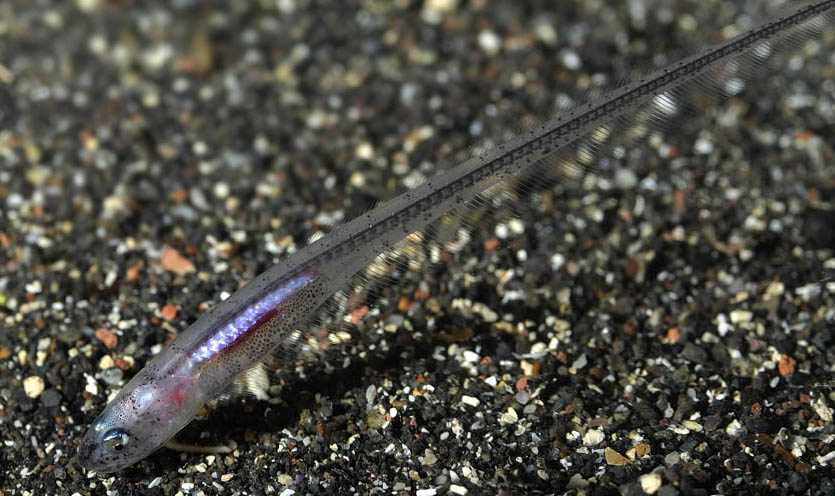
- Pearlfish (C. acus)
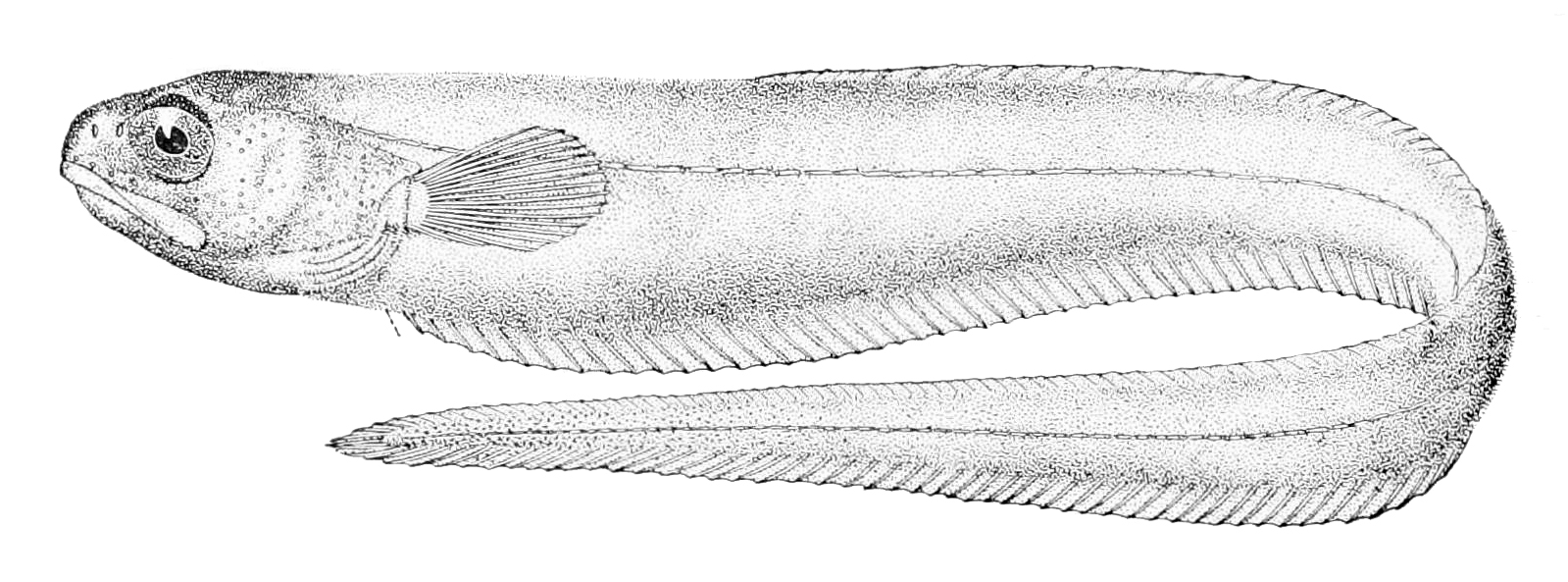
- Pacific Pearlfish (C. dubius)

Scientific classification
- Domain: Eukaryota
- Kingdom: Animalia
- Phylum: Chordata
- Class: Actinopterygii
- Order: Ophidiiformes
- Family: Carapidae
- Subfamily: Carapinae
- Genus: Carapus; Rafinesque, 1810

Type species
- Gymnotus acus Brünnich, 1768

Synonyms
- Diaphasia Lowe, 1843; Disparichthys Herre, 1935; Helminthodes Gill 1864; Lefroyia J. M. Jones, 1874; Leptofierasfer Meek & Hildebrand, 1928; Pirellinus Whitley, 1928; Porobronchus Kaup, 1860; Vexillifer Gasco, 1870

= Carapus =

Genus of fishes

Carapus is a genus of pearlfishes, with these currently recognized species:

- Carapus acus (Brünnich, 1768) (pearlfish)
- Carapus bermudensis (J. M. Jones, 1874) (Atlantic pearlfish)
- Carapus dubius (Putnam, 1874) (Pacific pearlfish)
- Carapus mourlani (Petit, 1934) (star pearlfish)
- Carapus sluiteri (M. C. W. Weber, 1905)

The Carapus (or pearlfish) belongs to the Carapidae family; they are described as eel-like fishes. This particular organism is considered parasitic because it lives inside different invertebrates. These invertebrates include holothurians, sea stars, and bivalves. The Carapus live in connection with several species of sea cucumbers and starfish.
