= Fairmount, Nova Scotia =

Coordinates: 44°38′45.2″N 63°37′41.8″W

Fairmount
- Neighbourhood
- Location within Nova Scotia
- Country: Canada
- Province: Nova Scotia
- Municipality: Halifax
- Community: Halifax
- Municipal District: District 9 (Halifax West Armdale)

Area
  - Total: 85 ha (210 acres)
- Area code: 782, 902

Fairmount, Nova Scotia is a neighbourhood of Halifax, Nova Scotia, Canada.

== History ==
From 1847 until 1868, Fairmount was home to a zoo. It was operated by Andrew Downs, and was approximately 40 ha (99 acres) in size, but closed in 1868.

In 1896, the Archdiocese of Halifax-Yarmouth used the land for Mount Olivet Cemetery (Halifax), a Roman Catholic cemetery. The cemetery contains the graves of some victims of the Titanic disaster, and some of the victims of the Halifax Explosion.

== Geography ==
The neighbourhood of Fairmount is encompassed to its north, south, and west by Armdale, and the West End to its east. Fairmount has a landmass of 85 hectares (0.85 km^{2}).

== Demographics ==
Although an established neighbourhood of Halifax, Fairmount does not have demographic estimates.

== Transportation ==
Fairmount has one transit route that travels through its boundaries; Route 26 (Springvale). Although there is only one transit route that serves the neighbourhood, Route 26 (Springvale) connects to the Mumford Terminal--which the transit-user can use to get other communities and terminals throughout the urban area of Halifax.
