= William A. Conklin =

American zoologist (1837–1913)

William A. Conklin Esq.
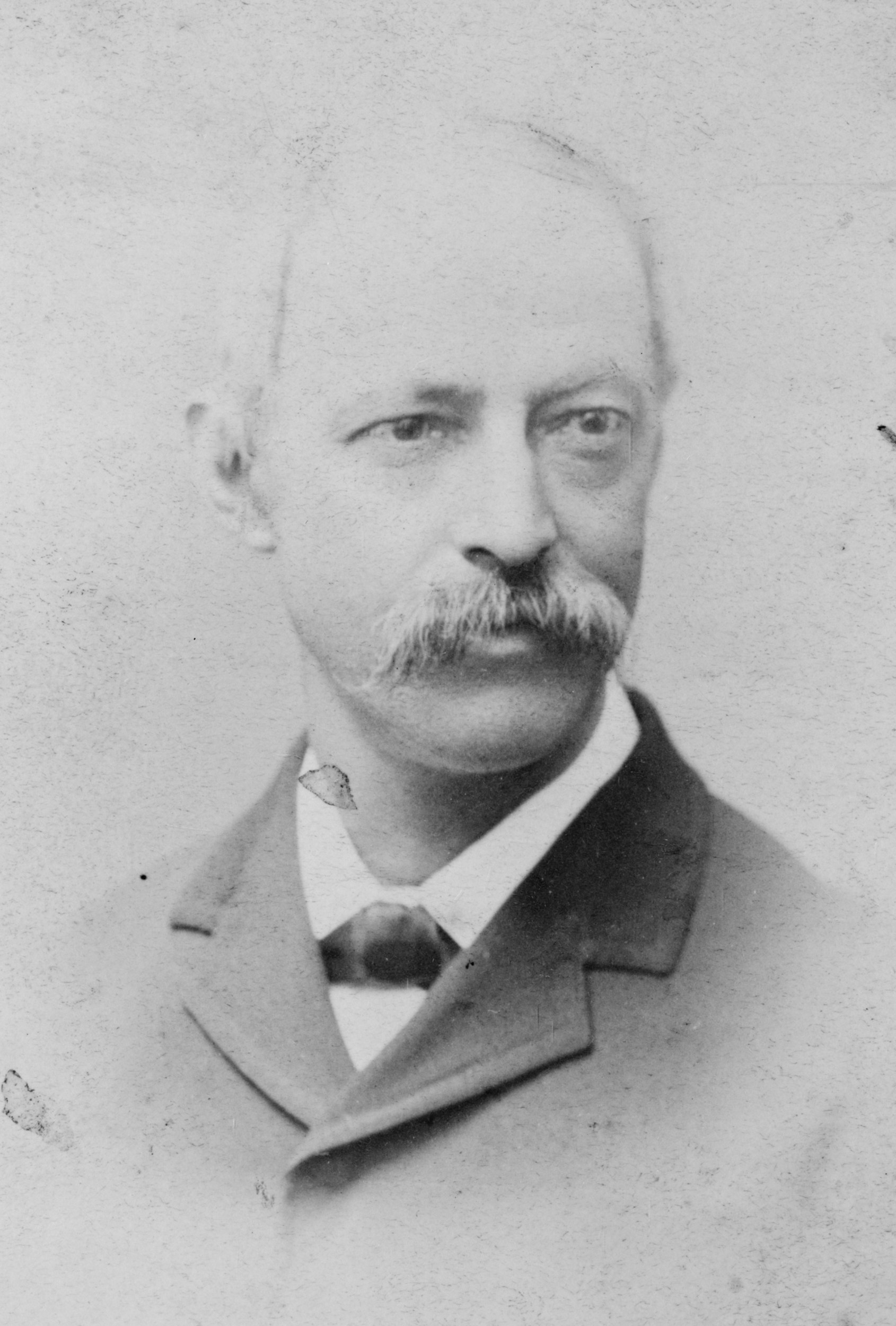
- Born: William Augustus Conklin; 17 March 1837; New York City, United States
- Died: 1913 (aged 75–76); New York City, United States
- Other name: W.A. Conklin
- Occupations: Zoologist; Veterinarian

William A. Conklin (17 March 1837 – 1913) was an American zoologist, veterinarian, and a former director of the Central Park Zoo.

== Early life and education ==
William Augustus Conklin was born on 17 March 1837 in New York City, United States.

He completed his early education in public schools before earning a Doctor of Veterinary Science from Columbia Veterinary College and a Ph.D. from Manhattan College.

== Career ==
W.A. Conklin had been involved with Central Park since 1858 before taking on the role of director of its zoological department. In 1861, state legislation authorized that a "portion of Central Park be set aside for the establishment of a zoological garden." William Conklin was appointed superintendent, prevailing over Canadian naturalist and zoologist Andrew Downs. He managed New York's Central Park Menagerie as its director from the 1860s through the 1880s. As the superintendent, he wrote many annual reports of the zoological department.

W.A. Conklin donated specimens in 1869 to Brown University for laboratory work, which included the carcasses of large birds and several monkeys. As an annual member, he also made a large number of donations to the American Museum of Natural History which were received and prepared by the museum's taxidermist. He supplied a night heron's egg, two other heron's eggs, and specimens of iron pyrites on 10 March 1873. On the 14th of June of that year, he presented swan and turkey eggs, later providing a quill of a condor on 18 November 1873. For the museum's Department of Birds and Mammals he donated a Central Park chimpanzee named Crowley that was mounted along with other mammals including three small monkeys, one lioness, one kangaroo, two armadillos, one tiger cat, one hyena, one black bear, one weasel, one sacred calf, and one Prussian sheep. He also provided 19 birds that were mostly large and from the menagerie. In September 1874, he supplied an egg of a box turtle. On 18 September 1875, he provided one specimen of amphioxi from Naples and one arrow-head and a spine of a star fish in October.

He began to contribute to "The American Sportsman" edited by W.F. Parker as early as 1874.

Conklin's donations from the Central Park Zoological Collection in 1876 included one Moor macaque (Macacus Maurus) on 22 March.

He was affiliated with many zoological societies as an honorary or corresponding member and belonged to multiple scientific societies in the United States. Conklin spoke before the American Acclimatization Society in November 1877, a New York City-based organization led by Eugene Schieffelin, outlining national initiatives to bring in "birds which were useful to the farmer and contributed to the beauty of the groves and fields." Conklin was elected to the Zoological Society of London as a corresponding member in 1879.

The menagerie director received a specimen of American mule deer (Cervus macrotis) at the menagerie in 1880, secured by John D. Caton on behalf of the Smithsonian Institution.

Conklin published "Felidæ in Captivity" in July 1880. He later published "Observations on the Camelidæ" in October 1880. That year, he also published studies on the Black Snake (Bascanion constrictor) and its eating habits within an exhibit at the Central Park Menagerie. By 1881, he was a member of the American Association for the Advancement of Science. Conklin became editor of "The Journal of Comparative Medicine and Surgery" (later changed to "The Journal of Comparative Medicine and Veterinary Archives") in 1881. The publication, a quarterly journal, covered "the anatomy, pathology, and therapentics of the lower animals".

Beginning 1 July 1884, W.A. Conklin received a six-week leave, set to end on 15 August 1884. Meanwhile, the Director of the Menagerie was permitted to exchange surplus animals from the Department of Public Parks for other species without incurring expenses.

Among his 1884 contributions to the U.S. National Museum were several monkeys, two lemurs, a jumping mouse, a fruit-eating bat, a civet cat, an Indian fawn, and a great kangaroo. He sent the U.S. National Museum an egg of a Griffon Vulture (Gyps fulvus) that was laid in the menagerie in 1885. In 1886, he presented a monkey (Macacus pelops) to the museum as well as a European badger (Meles taxus). He presented the museum with three living Gray Monitor lizards and two young tigers in 1888. In the following year, he sent a stork in the flesh, along with three eggs of the Black Swan (Cygnus atratus).

William A. Conklin participated in the first annual exhibition of the New York Poultry Exchange held at Madison Square Garden in December 1887. He received an honorable mention for his Black swans, Whistling ducks, Egyptian geese, and Curassows.

Conklin maintained one of the most comprehensive libraries in the country on mammalia and ornithology. He continued his role as editor of "The Journal of Comparative Medicine and Veterinary Archives," which transitioned from a quarterly to a monthly publication. In 1890, he was joined on the editorial staff by New York veterinarian R.S. Huidekoper. He also wrote extensively on natural history for various publications.

Under Dr. W.A. Conklin's supervision in 1890, the Central Park Menagerie provided a variety of specimens to the various departments of the U.S. National Museum. The Department of Mammals received 26 monkeys, including Kitty the chimpanzee, as well as lions, panthers, ocelots, a hyena, black bears, foxes, deer, antelopes, a bison, an Indian buffalo, angora goats, and a camel. The Department of Birds was supplied with 22 specimens, such as a Chinese thrush, toucan, cockatoo, macaw, pheasants, a pelican, and herons. The Department of Reptiles, Fishes, and Invertebrates obtained eight pythons, three iguanas, two alligators, and an African snake. Additionally, an Australian boomerang was gifted to the Department of Archaeology and Ethnology by Conklin.

In October 1890, he allowed Frederick Stuart Church, an American artist known for depicting animals, to test lavender's effects as an animal tamer on the lions and tigers at Central Park.

After William A. Conklin's forced resignation in 1892, New York City selected John W. Smith as the new superintendent of the menagerie.

The renowned zoologist and veterinarian was summoned from New York City to Pittsburgh in 1902. He was tasked with diagnosing the condition of Lucy Juba-Nile, a popular $3,000 hippopotamus living at the Highland Park Zoological Garden. Conklin was one of the few Americans with genuine hippopotamus expertise. He achieved national fame as the attending physician to the hippo family at New York's Central Park Zoo, before being dismissed in 1892 by Tammany Hall politicians.

== Death ==
William A. Conklin died in the United States in 1913.

== Works ==
- Felidæ in Captivity (1880)
- Observations on the Camelidæ (1880)
- Spinal Paralysis of the Young Carnivora (1882)
- Raids on the Central Park Menagerie
- Grando or Chalazion in an Eagle (1882)
- Degenerating Hæmatoma in an Iguana (1882)
- Catarrhal Phthisis in a Llama, with a Fibro-Calcareous Tumor in the Perineal Region (1882)
- Some Diseases of the Ostrich (1884)
- The Utility of Zoological Gardens (1887)
- Notes on the Breeding of a Hippopotamus (1890)
