= Fairview, Nova Scotia =

Fairview
- Urban Community
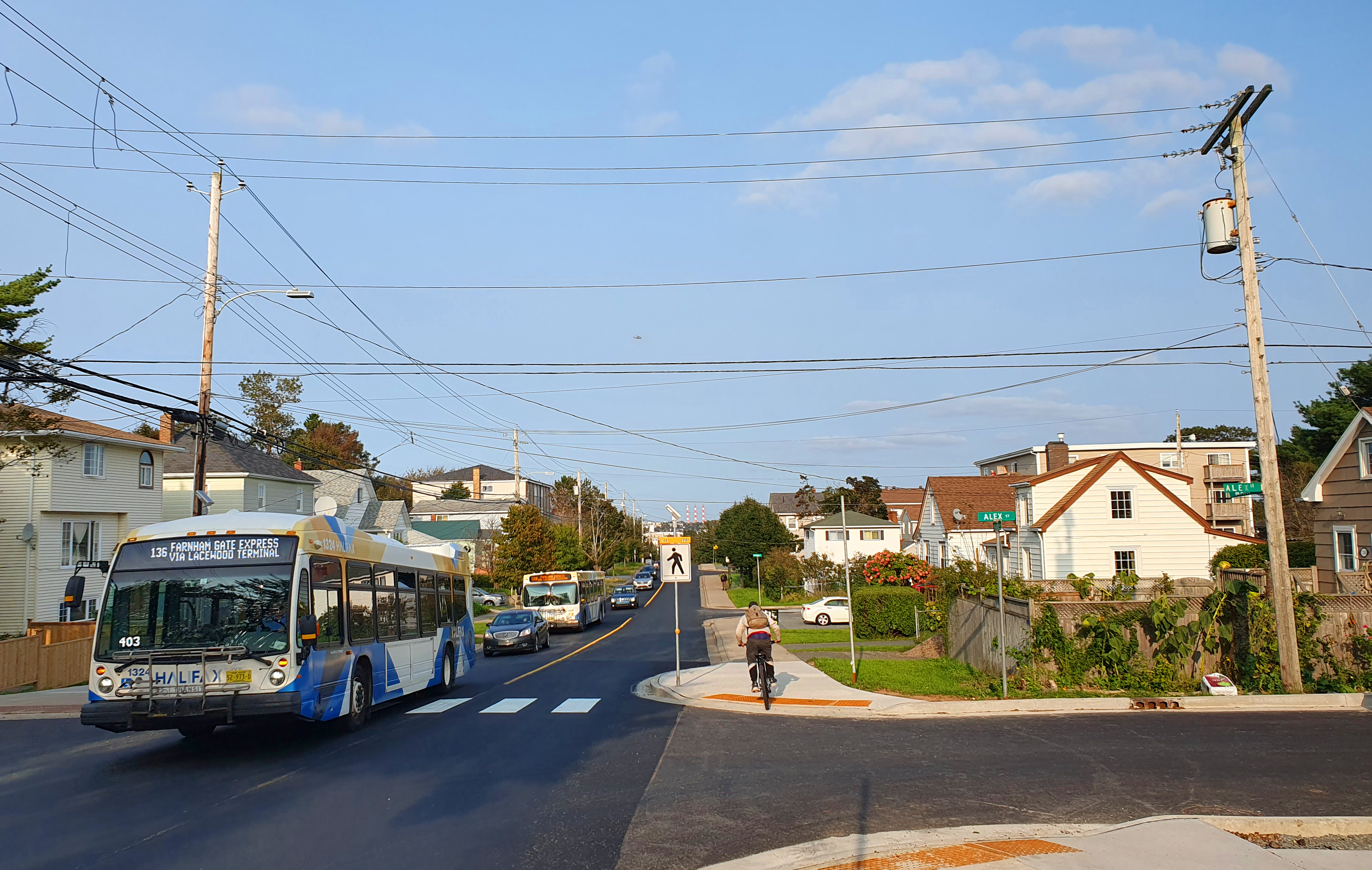
- Looking down Main Avenue in 2023
- Interactive map of Fairview
- Coordinates: 44°39′17″N 63°38′17″W
- Country: Canada
- Province: Nova Scotia
- Municipality: Halifax
- Community: Halifax
- Community council: Halifax and West

Area
  - Total: 2.181 km^{2} (0.842 sq mi)

Population (2021 Census)
  - Total: 8,618
  - Density: 3,951/km^{2} (10,230/sq mi)
- Canadian Postal code: B
- Area codes: 782, 902

Fairview is a community within the urban area of Halifax in Nova Scotia, Canada.

== History ==
Prior to European colonization, the Mi'kmaq lived on the land for thousands of years.

In the 1750s, many of the Foreign Protestants settled in the area. First known as the Westerwald ("western forest"), the settlement was called the Dutch Village by non-German locals. Some of the passengers of the Foreign Protestant ships settled temporarily in the Dutch Village while they waited for a more permanent settlement in Lunenburg County.

In the early 20th century, most of the current street network in the area was established. It formed a regular grid pattern up the eastern slope of Geizers Hill, facing toward the Bedford Basin and the Halifax peninsula.

After World War I, the railway lines in the Fairview area came under control of Canadian National Railways. Canadian National Railways established its new locomotive servicing shops and roundhouse for the Halifax area in the community, which was named Fairview Station on 1 March 1921. Until the 1950s, the majority of Fairview's residents were employed by the railway.

The community name was shortened to Fairview on 19 January 1956.

In 1958, Fairview became home to Halifax West Municipal High School (later changed to Halifax West High School in 1969), located on Dutch Village Road.

In the early 1960s, to construct the inner-urban portion of Highway 102, all of the homes on School Avenue's southern side were appropriated—and subsequently demolished—by the province. School Avenue itself is still owned by the province of Nova Scotia and is the only civic street in the area not under municipal authority.

Through the 1960s, Fairview continued to fill in and its housing densified. During the late 1960s and early 1970s, Fairview developed into a major shopping destination after Halifax's first suburban shopping mall, the Bayers Road Shopping Centre, was constructed.

In 1969, the City of Halifax annexed the communities of Armdale, Clayton Park, Fairview, Rockingham, and Spryfield.

Newer residential developments in outlying areas during the 1970s-1990s, such as the modern development in adjacent Clayton Park, along with a demand by families for larger homes, saw Fairview's working-class neighbourhoods of smaller homes become a less desirable location over time. The last subdivision to be completed in the community was Keystone Court in 1990.

On 1 April 1996, Halifax County was dissolved and all of its places (cities, suburbs, towns, and villages) were turned into communities of a single-tier municipality named Halifax Regional Municipality. Subsequently, Fairview turned into a community within the new Municipality of Halifax.

In honour of the original settlement, a section of Dutch Village Road—which had been an exit to Highway 102—was renamed Westerwald Street in November 2002. Dutch Village Road/Westerwald Street now form the main commercial street at the foot of Fairview's slope, the corner of Westerwald Street, Bayers Road to the basin end of Joseph Howe Drive.

== Geography ==
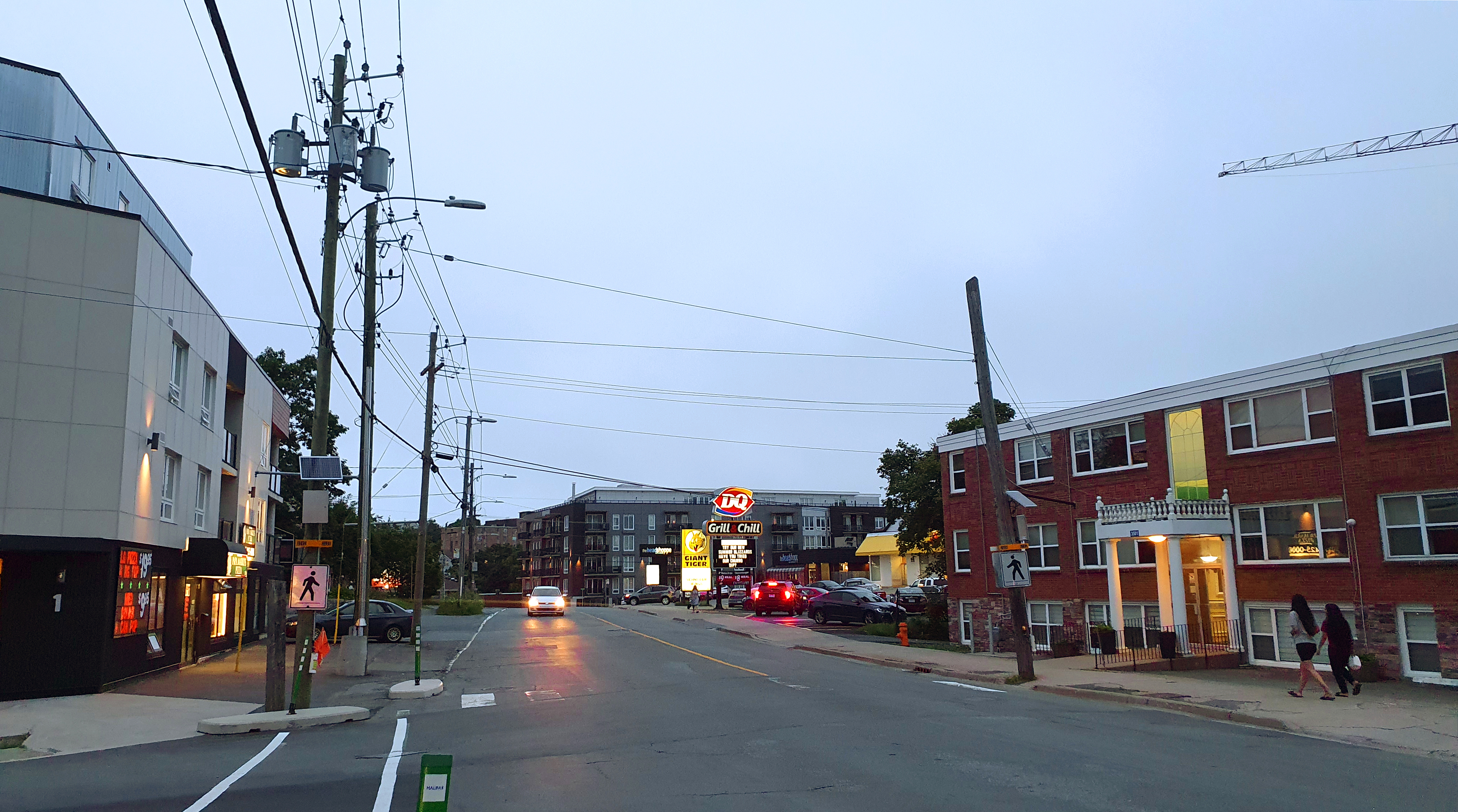
Dutch Village Road at the intersection of Rosedale Avenue in the summer of 2023.

Fairview is named after Fairview Cove, which forms the extreme southern end of Bedford Basin at the northern edge of the isthmus connecting the Chebucto Peninsula to the Halifax Peninsula. Its landmass is approximately 218.1 ha (539 acres). As such, Fairview sits astride and is bisected by several major transportation corridors:

- Bayers Road, which used to run from Halifax's North End neighbourhood to Bayers Lake, a freshwater lake northwest of Fairview - and now runs to an intersection with Joseph Howe Drive
- CN Rail lines from yards in nearby Rockingham to the Halifax Ocean Terminal, as well as to the Richmond Terminals, and to the Bayer's Lake Business Park.
- Dutch Village Road, which in 2002 was shortened to operate as a small loop through the old business district in Fairview - it originally ran along much of the alignment for Joseph Howe Drive
- Highway 102 expressway, (Bicentennial Drive or "Bi-Hi") which crosses through the neighbourhood on a 1960s-era overpass which crosses several major streets and rail lines
- Trunk 2, (the Bedford Highway), which has its southern terminus in Fairview along the shore of Bedford Basin and connects to the North End community of Halifax via the 1950s-era Fairview Overpass
- Joseph Howe Drive, which runs the length of the Halifax Peninsula's isthmus

== Demographics ==
According to the 2021 Halifax Census Tract Map, more specifically Census Tract 2050024.00, Fairview has about 8,618 people over a landmass of approximately 2.181 km^{2} (0.842 sq mi).

The community (Census Tract 2050024.00) is one of the fastest-growing communities in Halifax. From 2016 to 2021 the community grew 16.9% from 7,375 people in 2016 to 8,618 people in 2021. Additionally, Fairview is also one of the densest communities within Halifax—and its population density increased from approximately 33 people per hectare (3,300 people per km^{2}) in 2016, to approximately 39 people per hectare (3,900 people per km^{2}) in 2021.

Fairview population history
Year	Pop.	±%
2016	7,375	—
2021	8,618	+16.9%

== Community ==
The community food bank is located at the Salvation Army on 50 Gesner Street.

The Masonic Lodge (formerly Saint Pius X Church) is at 165 Coronation Avenue. Home of the oldest Masonic Lodge in the British Commonwealth outside England itself. Saint Andrew's Lodge No.1 established in 1750 A.D.

The Royal Canadian Legion Branch No. 142 is at 50 Hillcrest Street.

The Fairview Resource Centre is a community registered charity located at 6 Titus Street. It is open 5 days a week.

Sport facilities are located near the centre of the neighbourhood in W.D. Piercey Park.

=== Places of worship ===
Christian:

- Bayers Road Baptist Church, 7077 Bayers Road
- Calvary Tabernacle (United Pentecostal), 20 Gesner Street
- Calvin Presbyterian Church, 3311 Ashburn Avenue
- Convoy Avenue Church of Christ, 48 Convoy Avenue
- Elim Living Church (Eritrean), 7077 Bayers Road
- Grace Church Halifax (Korean Presbyterian), 7077 Bayers Road
- Halifax Victory Church, 12 Hillcrest Street
- Fairview United Church, 3524 Dutch Village Road
- Mosaic Christian Church, 28 Willett Street
- Our Lady of Lebanon Antiochian Maronite Catholic Church, 3844 Dutch Village Road
- The Salvation Army: Fairview Citadel, 50 Gesner Street
- Saint John's Anglican Church, 3415 Dutch Village Road (Deconsecrated on January 21, 2007)
- Saint Mena Coptic Orthodox Church, 167 Willett Street

Islamic:

- Masjid Albarakah (United Muslims of Halifax Society), 12 Hillcrest Street

== Education ==
Public school education in Fairview is governed by the Halifax Regional School Board. Fairview lies within District 10.

=== Current schools ===
- Ecole Burton Ettinger Elementary
- Fairview Heights Annex Elementary
- Fairview Heights Elementary
- Fairview Junior High (1973–present)

== Notable residents ==
- Eric Boulton; NHL Hockey Player
- Tyson Cave; Pro Boxer Super bantamweight
- The Dutch Village Philosopher, Titus Smith Jr. (1768–1850), a writer, surveyor, geologist and botanist

== Political representation ==
- Patricia Arab, Member of the Legislative Assembly (Nova Scotia Liberal Party) for Fairview-Clayton Park
- Kathryn Morse, HRM District 10 Councillor, elected in October 2020 (Halifax Bedford Basin West, including Fairview, Clayton Park and Rockingham)
- Geoff Regan, Member of Parliament (Liberal) for Halifax West
