= Joseph Salter =

Canadian businessman and politician

His Worship Joseph Salter

Mayor of Moncton
- In office May 1855 – 1857
- Preceded by: Incorporation*

Secretary of the Caledonia Mining and Manufacturing Company
- In office 1870s–1890s
- Preceded by: G. F. Burn
- Succeeded by: Unknown

President of G. & J. Salter
- In office October 24, 1846 – 1856
- Preceded by: Firm founded*
- Succeeded by: Firm closed*

Personal details
- Born: June 7, 1816 Kennetcook, Nova Scotia
- Died: January 1, 1901 (aged 84) Most likely Nova Scotia
- Spouse: Eliza Salter

Joseph Salter (June 7, 1816 – January 1, 1901) was a Canadian businessman and politician, becoming Moncton’s first mayor and one of the leading shipbuilders in the Maritime Provinces. As a young man employed by John Leander Starr of Halifax, Salter crossed the Atlantic 36 times. He later built some of the finest and largest ships in Westmorland County. He kept a diary which was published in 1996.

== Early life ==
Joseph Salter was born in Kennetcook, Hants County, Nova Scotia on June 7th, 1816, the tenth, and last, child of Robert Salter and Elizabeth Smith. The Salter family initially lived in Falmouth, Nova Scotia, but later moved to Kennetcook, where Joseph was born.

At the age of twelve, Salter left home and took a schooner across the Bay of Fundy to attend the National School (based on the English National schools) in Saint John, New Brunswick. Not long after leaving the school, Salter clerked for a firm in Saint John until he was 18.

== Career ==
After his schooling, he departed for Halifax, Nova Scotia, where he entered the office of Leander Starr, where he was soon promoted to head clerk. While in Starr’s occupation, Salter made many trading voyages to the West Indies and Africa, earning the nickname "Africana".

=== G. & J. Salter ===
After giving up seafaring, Salter went into business with his brother George in Saint John. The firm of G. & J. Salter, with their knowledge of foreign business contacts, operated as ship brokers for local shipbuilders. On October 24, 1846, George purchased the former Stephen Binney shipyard on the banks of the Petitcodiac River at "The Bend", now known as Moncton. At the age of 31, Salter moved to The Bend in 1847 to operate the shipyard while his brother George remained in Saint John to run the ship brokerage and chandlery business.

=== Shipbuilding ===
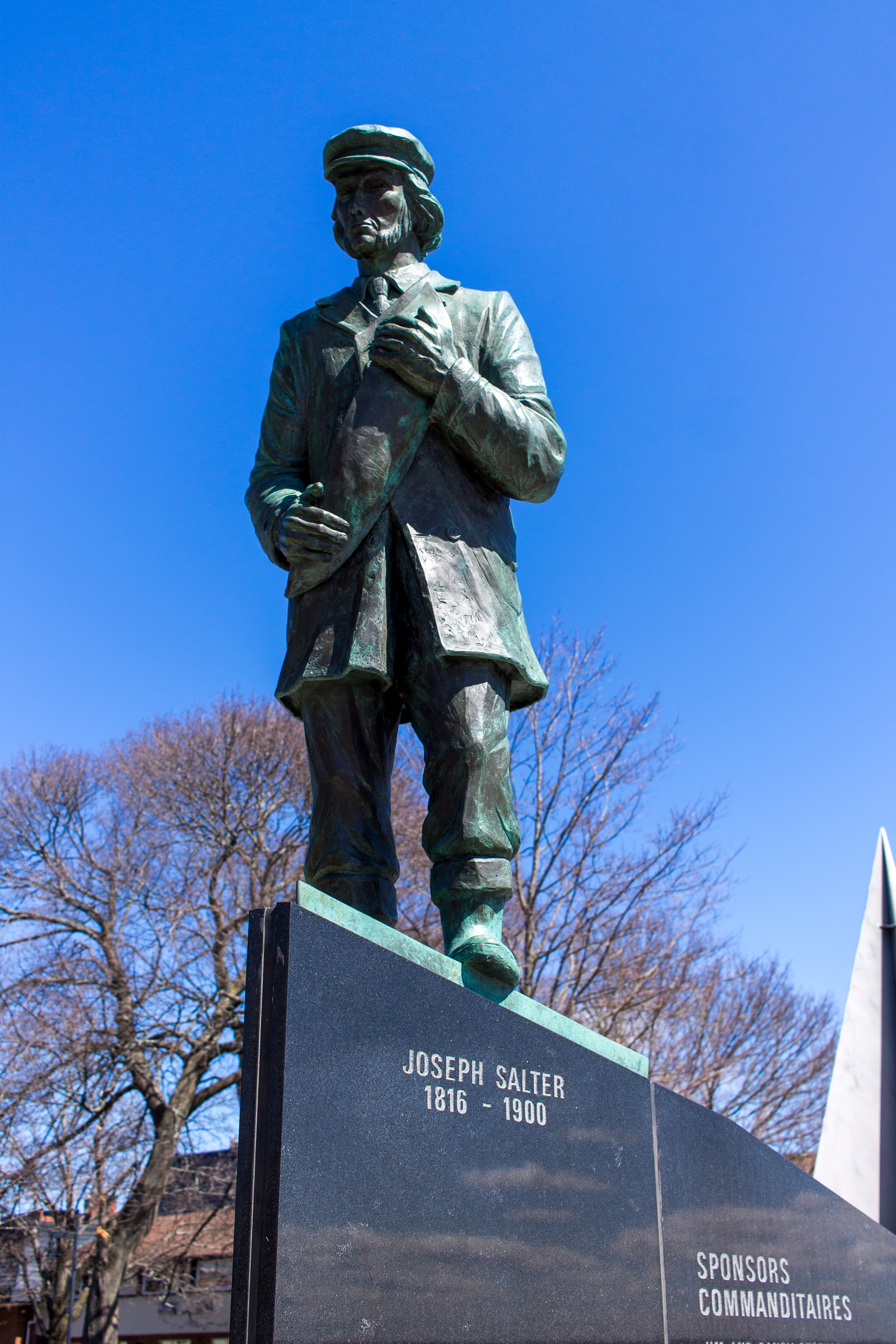
The statue of Joseph Salter on the Moncton 100 Monument.

When the Salters took over the Binney shipyard, Duncan Robertson continued to operate as the shipyard foreman. On August 11, 1847, the first vessel that was launched was the Hants, a 652-ton ship. Over the next decade, the Salters and Robertson launched nineteen more vessels, all large full-rigged ships, except for the schooner James. All these ships were destined for the Liverpool market and British owners. In total, the Salter yard constructed 17,207 tons, their largest vessel being the ship Lady Clarendon. Other notable ships include Maggie Miller and War Spirit. In addition to building their own vessels, G. & J. Salter purchased a total of 21 vessels from other New Brunswick shipbuilders. Joseph Salter was a progressive man. The following incident illustrates his relationship with the men he employed. Rum drinking was a major problem that impeded the operation of Salter’s shipyard. So on an early morning in April, Salter waited upon by a delegation of his workers who protested the length of the working day, which was from sunrise to sunset. As a result, Salter told the delegation that he would gladly agree to their request of a 10-hour working day if the men promised to stay away from the grog shop on evenings before work. He also promised to set up a quarters for them above the lofting shop that would be stocked with material for them to read. This undoubtedly was Moncton’s first library. He built Persian ship in 1856 in Moncton.

=== Political career ===
Moncton was incorporated as a town on April 12, 1855. The following month municipal elections were held and Joseph Salter was elected as Moncton’s first mayor and would serve an additional two terms.

=== Collapse of shipbuilding and subsequent career ===
After a short but prosperous ten years the Salter business came to an end due to adverse conditions in England, which caused significant losses on several new vessels sent there for sale. Joseph Salter was compelled to give up shipbuilding, and began working in other fields. He moved to Albert Mines where he became Secretary of the Caledonia Mining and Manufacturing company, engaged in extracting oil from shale, being the first to produce oil in that manner in New Brunswick.

Salter later moved to Waverley, Nova Scotia, and then to North Sydney, Nova Scotia, where he managed gold and coal mines respectively. In North Sydney he also ran a lumber business, while still operating as a ship broker. Salter retired in 1899 after a long and productive career and he died year later on January 1, 1901, at the age of 84.

== Honours ==
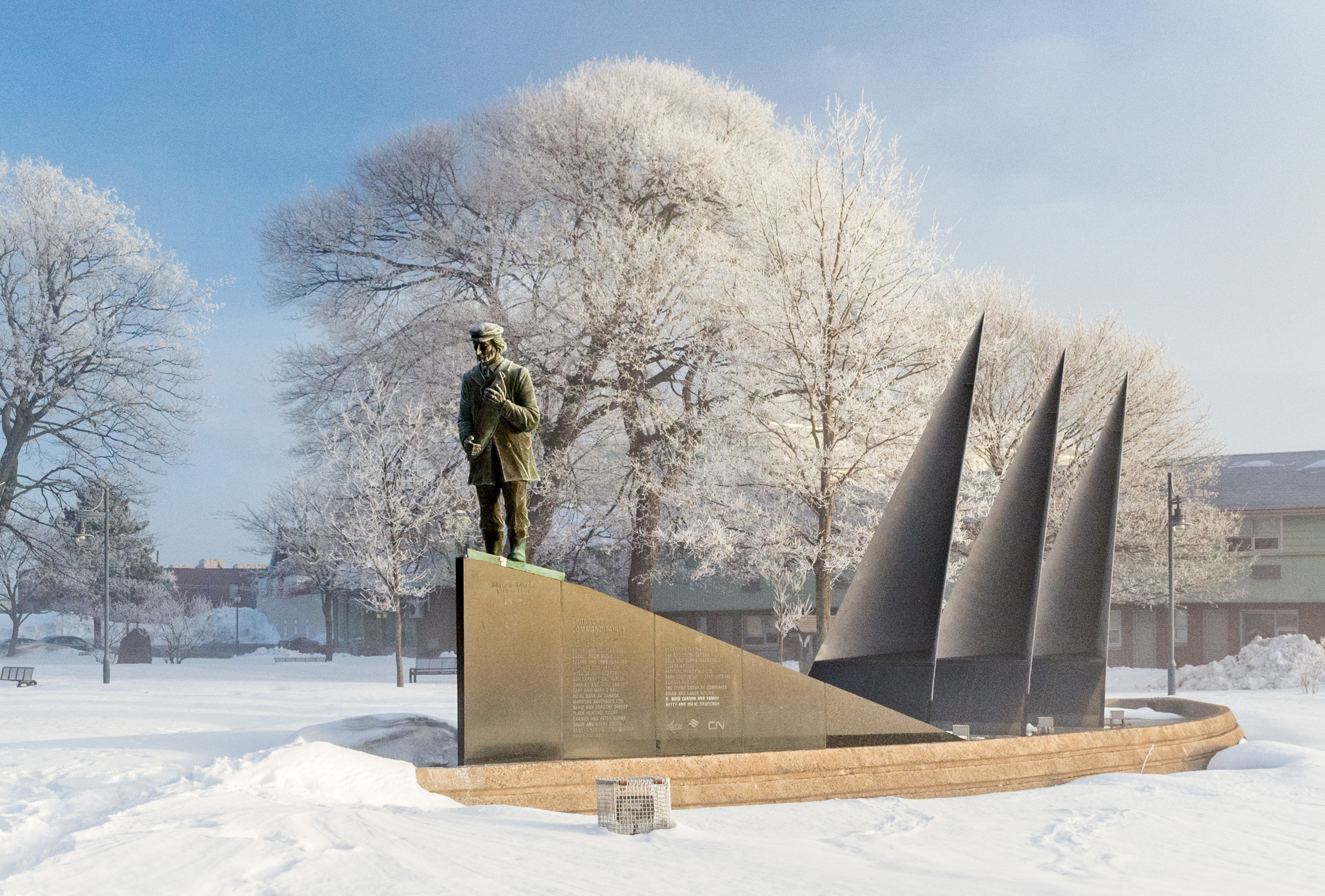
The Moncton 100 Monument in Moncton, New Brunswick.

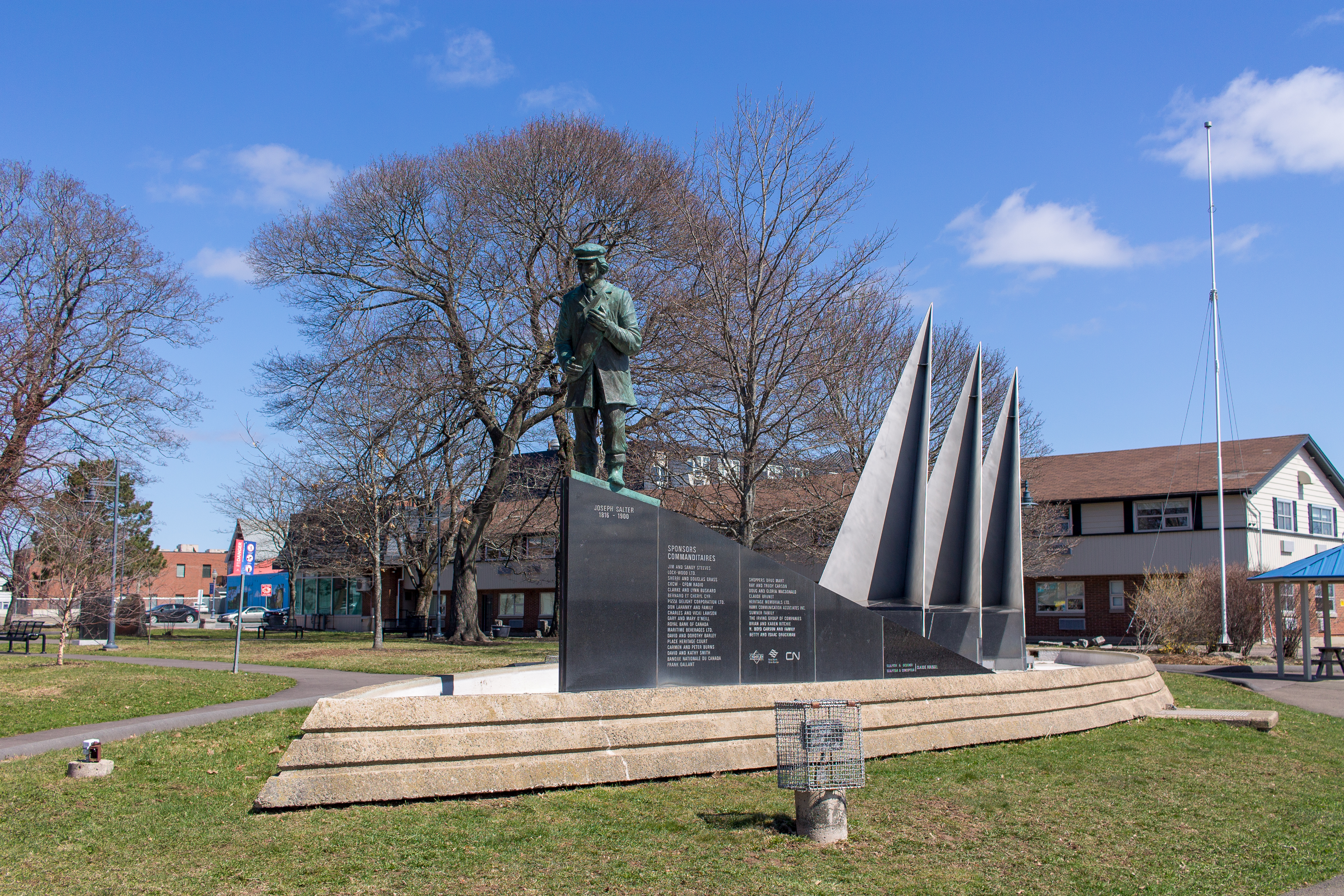
The Moncton 100 Monument in Moncton, New Brunswick.

To commemorate Joseph Salter’s contribution to community life, the City of Moncton erected the Moncton 100 Monument on December 30, 1990, as part of the city’s centennial celebrations. The monument depicts Salter overlooking the Petitcodiac River near the exact location of his shipyard.
