= Campbell Hardy (British Army officer) =

British Royal Artillery officer (1831–1919)

Major-General Campbell Hardy
- Born: October 1831; Norwich, Norfolk, England
- Died: 11 April 1919 (aged 87); Dover, Kent, England
- Military career
- Allegiance: Kingdom of Great Britain
- Branch: British Army
- Rank: Major-General
- Unit: Royal artillery

Campbell Hardy (1831 – 11 April 1919) was a British Royal Artillery officer, naturalist, artist, and writer.

== Early life ==
Campbell Hardy was born on 10 October 1831 in Norwich, Norfolk, England. He was the eldest son of Rev. Charles Hardy of Whitewell.

== Career ==
Hardy was commissioned into the Royal Artillery of the British Army. Starting as an Ensign (or Second Lieutenant) on 19 December 1849, he was promoted to First Lieutenant on 11 August 1851.

He wrote and illustrated books on hunting while stationed in Nova Scotia. One of his notable works, "Sporting Adventures in the New World; or, Days and Nights of Moose-Hunting in the Pine Forests of Acadia", was published in 1855.

He was appointed to captain of the Royal Artillery on 23 February 1856. That year, he wrote an appendix for American author Charles Lanman's "Adventures in the Wilds of the United States and British American Provinces".

In the early 1860s, Hardy created numerous paintings, one of which depicted a gold washing scene near Lunenberg. As a writer, he penned an 1864 article titled 'Sketches in Our Neighbourhood: An Afternoon with Downs' for the Acadian Recorder, a Halifax newspaper, where he described the Nova Scotia naturalist's home and zoological gardens.

He became a member of the Nova Scotian Institute of Science on 26 January 1863. On 3 October 1866, he was elected as its vice president, serving a term alongside Dr. John Bernard Gilpin. In December 1866, he presented a paper titled "On the Beaver in Nova Scotia," in which its model of a beaver house and drawings of beaver dams were forwarded to the 1867 Paris Exhibition. The sportsman and naturalist wrote a book on the natural history of Nova Scotia titled "Forest Life in Acadie: Sketches of Sport and Natural History in the Lower Provinces of the Canadian Dominion" in 1869. By this time, Hardy had resided in the Acadian provinces for 15 years. He wrote about adventures in moose hunting, camping, and his studies on caribou, beavers, black bears, and Acadian fish.

Promoted to the rank of major on 5 July 1872, Hardy eventually became lieutenant-colonel on 16 January 1875.

== Personal life ==
His wife's name was Matilda Sydney, and they got married in Halifax on 23 June 1855.

== Death ==
Maj. Gen. Campbell Hardy died on 11 April 1919 in Dover, Kent, England.

== Works ==
- Indian Remedy for Smallpox
- Sporting Adventures in the New World; or, Days and Nights of Moose-Hunting in the Pine Forests of Acadia (1855)
- On the Beaver in Nova Scotia (1866)
- Forest Life in Acadie: Sketches of Sport and Natural History in the Lower Provinces of the Canadian Dominion (1869)
