= John Starr (physician) =

British geriatrician

- Born: 14 August 1960
- Died: 8 December 2018; Edinburgh
- Education: University of Cambridge
- Known for: Honorary Professor at University of Edinburgh
- Medical career
- Profession: physician
- Institutions: University of Edinburgh
- Sub-specialties: Geriatrics

John Starr FRCPE (died 8 December 2018) was a British geriatrician. He was Honorary Professor at University of Edinburgh and a Fellow of the Royal Institute of Public Health.
