= John Young (agricultural reformer) =

Canadian politician

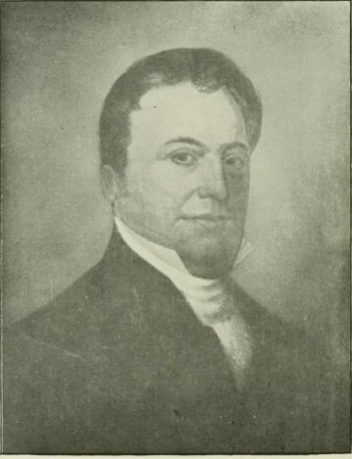
- John Young (1773-1837)
- Born: 1 September 1773; Falkirk, Scotland
- Died: 6 October 1837 (aged 64); Halifax, Nova Scotia, Canada
- Other name: Agricola
- Citizenship: United Kingdom
- Education: University of Glasgow
- Occupations: Merchant, author, agronomist, and agricultural reformer
- Employer(s): John Young and Company (founder)
- Organization: Central Board of Agriculture (founding member)
- Spouse: Agnes Renny (m. 1814–1837)
- Children: William Young (son); George Renny Young (son); Charles Young (son)
- Parents: William Young (father); Janet Young (mother)

Member of the Nova Scotia House of Assembly for Sydney County
- In office 1824 – 1837
- Preceded by: John Cunningham
- Succeeded by: Richard J. Forrestall

Personal details
- Party: Liberal

John Young (September 1, 1773 – October 6, 1837) was a Scottish-born merchant, author, agronomist, and agricultural reformer in Nova Scotia. He represented Sydney County in the Nova Scotia House of Assembly from 1824 to 1837. He supported the Royal Acadian School.

He was born in Falkirk, the son of William Young, and studied theology at University of Glasgow but did not graduate. He entered business at Falkirk and then Glasgow. Young married Agnes Renny. In 1814, he came to Halifax with his wife and sons and set up in business as a dry goods merchant there. Believing that there was room for improvement in the state of agriculture in the province, Young wrote a number of letters to the Acadian Recorder under the name Agricola. This led to the creation of a provincial agricultural society in 1818. From this society a Central Board of Agriculture was formed in 1819, Young became secretary and treasurer. Young ran unsuccessfully for the Halifax Township seat in the provincial assembly in 1823 before being elected for Sydney County in an 1824 by-election. He died in office in Halifax at the age of 64.

His sons William and George also served in the Nova Scotia assembly and his son Charles was colonial administrator for Prince Edward Island.

Nova Scotian artist William Valentine painted Young's portrait.

== Letters of Agricola ==
John Young, under the pseudonym of Agricola, wrote 38 letters in the Acadian Recorder from 1818 to 1819. These letters, would prove to be the basis of establishment and communication with a number of different agricultural societies throughout the province, as well as provide the basis for the subsequent development of the Central Board of Agriculture in 1819 and Young's appointment to the Central Board of Agriculture following Young revealing his identity to the public in 1819. Following this, Young would establish his own experimental farm before writing publicly under his own name again in 1821.

These letters, published as a group in 1822, are structured as such:

- Climate
- Soil
- Agricultural Machinery
- The Plough
- The Harrow
- Manures
- Correspondence
- Sherbooke Agricultural Society
- Provincial Agricultural Society
- Natural Obstructions in the Soil
- Prizes Awarded
- Digby Agricultural Society

These letters are often recognized as one of the earliest basis for the agricultural sciences and devoted attention to agricultural improvement in Canada.

== Legacy ==
- Namesake of Agricola Street, Halifax, Nova Scotia
- Namesake of the Agricola Collections of the MacRae Library of the Dalhousie University Faculty of Agriculture
