= Joseph Pernette =

Canadian politician

Joseph Pernette (1728–1807) was a German-born merchant and political figure in Nova Scotia. He represented Lunenburg County in the Nova Scotia House of Assembly from 1761 to 1770.

He was born in Strasbourg, served in the Breton Volunteers and then came to Nova Scotia as a Foreign Protestants with Edward Cornwallis in 1751. Pernette served as an aide-de-camp during the taking of Quebec City in the Battle of the Plains of Abraham. He first settled at Halifax but later moved to the New Dublin area. He built a gristmill and a sawmill on the LaHave River and also built the first ship on the river. Pernette served as justice of the peace, deputy surveyor and was colonel in the local militia, participating in the defense of Lunenburg during the Raid on Lunenburg, Nova Scotia (1782). He also conducted a census of the area and constructed a road to Lunenburg. Pernette also operated a ferry connecting that road to the road to Liverpool.

His daughter Charlotte married Charles Morris and his daughter Catherine married Garrett Miller.
