= George Augustus Boardman =

American-Canadian ornithologist

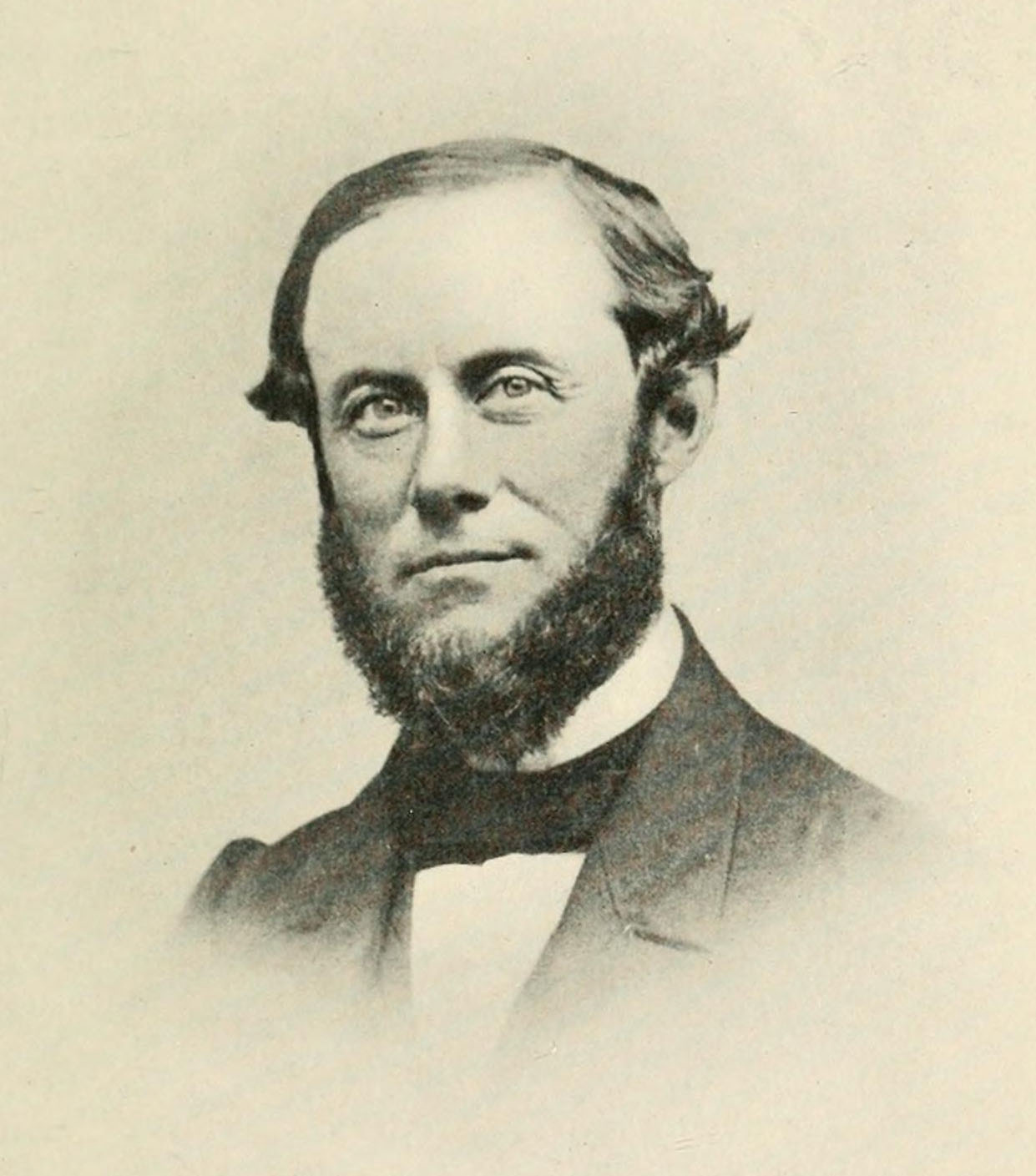
George Augustus Boardman aged about 36

George Augustus Boardman (February 5, 1818 – January 11, 1901) was an American-born lumber merchant and ornithologist in the New Brunswick area of Canada.

Boardman was born in 1818 at Newburyport, Massachusetts. In 1828 he moved to Calais, Maine with his family, where he lived until his marriage in 1843. He then took up residence in St. Stephen, New Brunswick where he was buried.

He owned a lumber business for more than 30 years, after which he retired in 1871. As a beginner in the ornithological field, he met with many famous naturalists and became friends with Spencer F. Baird, from the Smithsonian Institution. He spend his winters in Florida after he retired from his job, during which time he collected specimens of many kinds most of which were donated to the United States National Museum. He died in 1901. His contributions to ornithological literature was Catalogue of the Birds Found in the Vicinity of Calais, Maine, and about the Islands at the Mouth of the Bay of Fundy which appeared in the Proceedings of Boston Society of Natural History in 1862.

Boardman is important to history for his study of bird life in southwestern New Brunswick and the lower Bay of Fundy. He was described by another ornithologist from the area as "the most outstanding naturalist, bird student and collector ever produced by northeastern Maine or the Maritime Provinces of Canada."
