= John Starr (politician) =

Canadian politician

John Starr (February 20, 1775 – December 30, 1827) was a merchant and political figure in Nova Scotia. He represented Kings County in the Nova Scotia House of Assembly in 1827. He supported the Royal Acadian School.

He was born at Starr's Point, Nova Scotia, the son of David Starr and Susannah Potter. After learning the trade of blacksmith, he moved to Halifax, where he became a merchant and ship owner, operating an import-export business. In 1797, he married Desiah Gore. In 1824, Starr became colonel in the Halifax militia. He was also a magistrate. He died in office in 1827.

His daughter Margaret Sophia married James Ratchford, who served in the province's legislative council. His son John Leander Starr also served in the legislative council and married Mary Sophia Ratchford, James' sister.
