= Downs' Zoological Gardens =

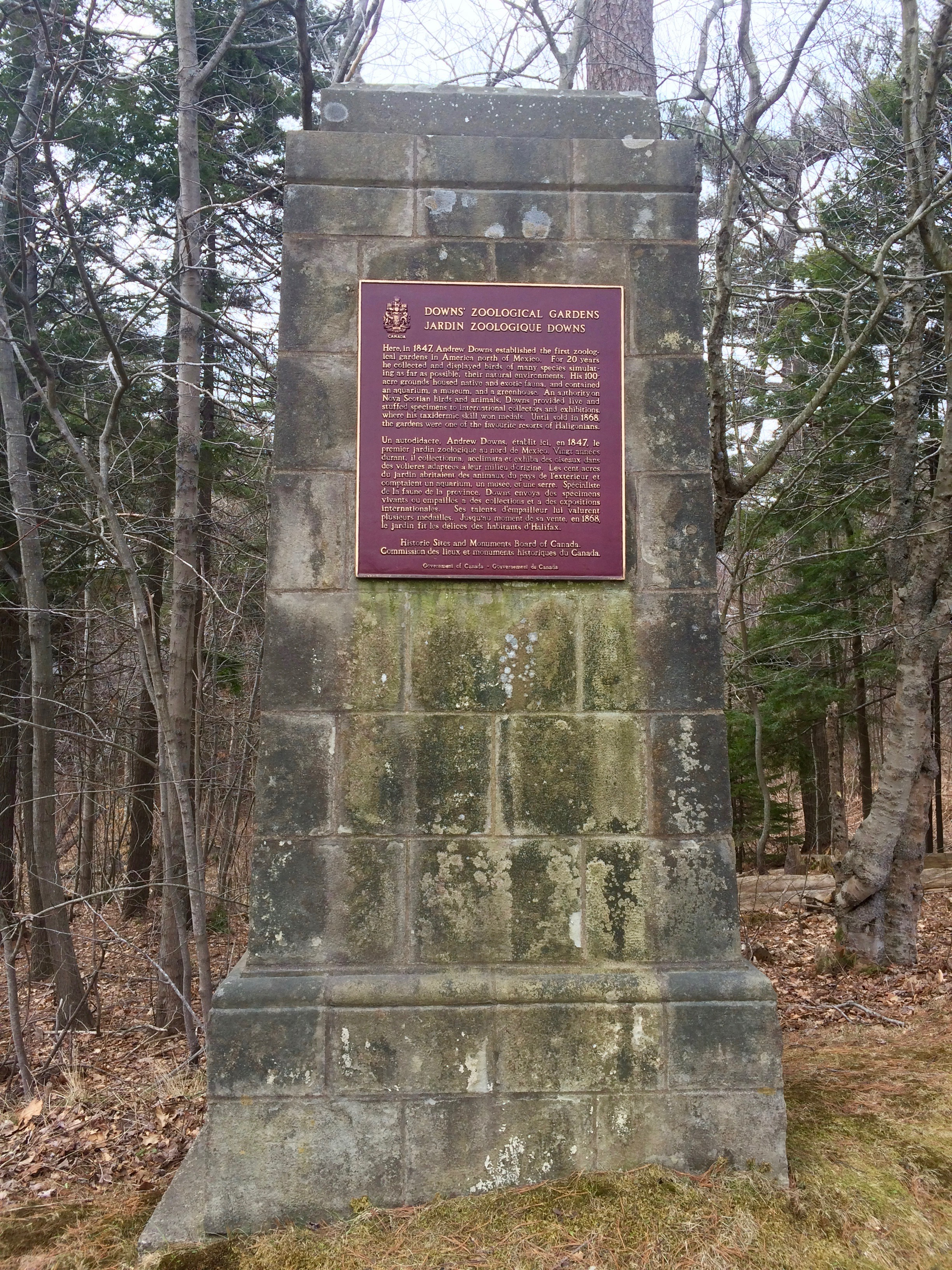
- Interactive map of Downs' Zoological Gardens
- 44°38′42″N 63°37′36″W
- Date opened: 1847
- Date closed: 1876
- Location: Northwest Arm; Fairmount, Nova Scotia, Canada
- Land area: 40 acres (16 ha)

Downs' Zoological Gardens is the oldest North American scientific zoo north of Mexico, and opened to the public the same year as the London Zoo.

== History ==
=== Opening ===
It was opened in Nova Scotia in 1847, and was originally intended to be used as a collection for scientific study. By the early 1860s, the zoo grounds covered 40 - 100 hectares. It became a popular place for many people of Halifax to visit.

=== Features ===
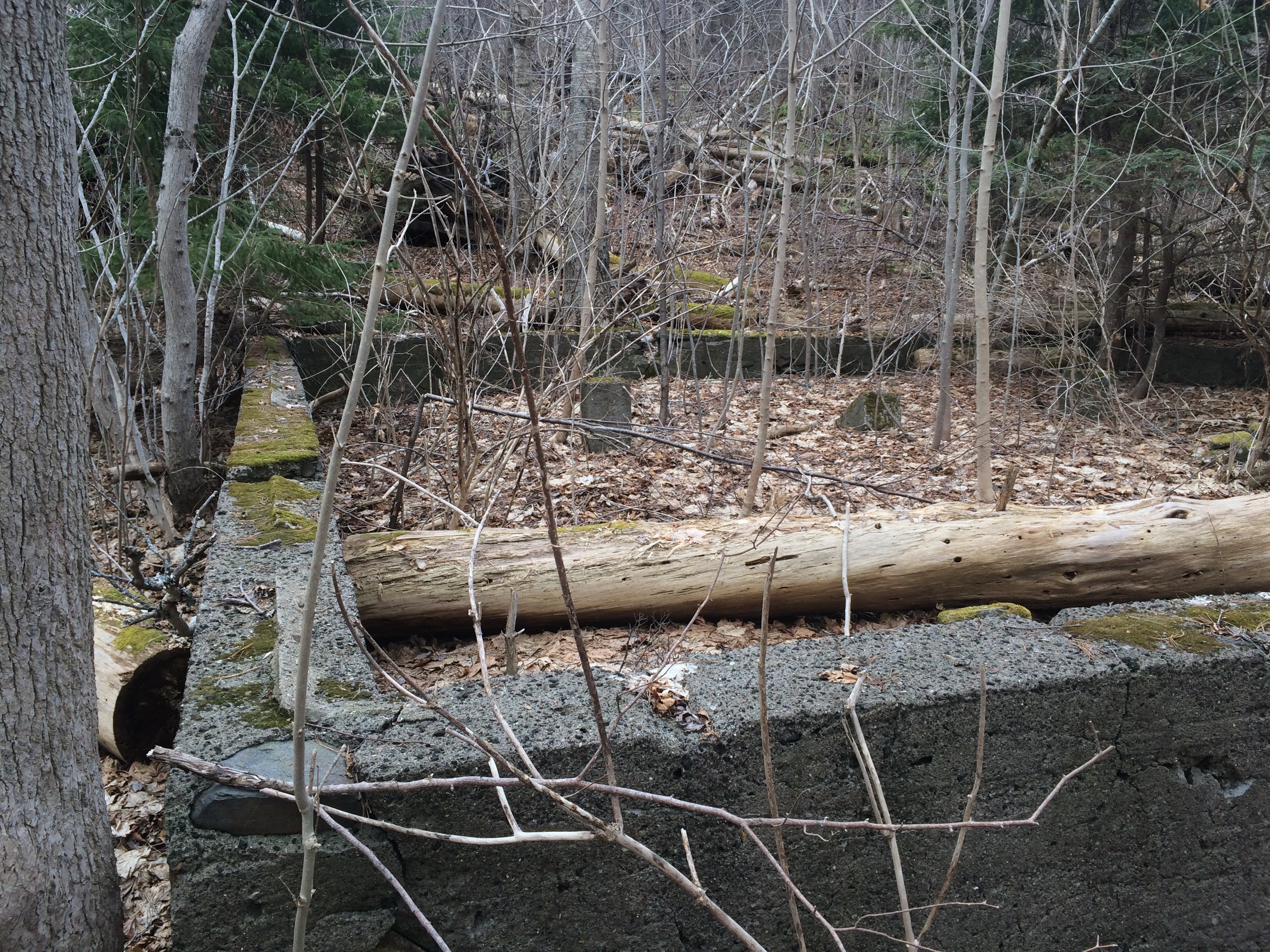
What appears to be remnants of the bear den.

The Zoo had many fine flowers and ornamental trees, picnic areas, statues, walking paths, The Glass House (which contained a greenhouse with an aviary, aquarium, and museum of stuffed animals and birds), a pond, a bridge over a waterfall, an artificial lake with a fountain, a wood-ornamented greenhouse, a forest area, and enclosures and buildings.

=== Closing ===
The zoo closed in 1868, when zookeeper Andrew Downs was offered a job to set up a zoo at Central Park in New York City. The land and animals were sold and Downs moved his family to New York. In three months, Downs had quit the job in New York and moved back to Nova Scotia and attempted to rebuild the old zoo.
