= Garrett Miller (politician) =

Canadian politician

Garrett Miller (ca 1770 – December 7, 1840) was a merchant and political figure in Nova Scotia. He represented Lunenburg County in the Nova Scotia House of Assembly from 1836 to 1840 as a Conservative.

He was the son of Jacob Miller, a loyalist from New York who settled in Halifax, Nova Scotia. In 1802, he married Catherine, the daughter of Joseph Pernette. Miller served as a justice of the peace and was prize commissioner for privateers at Halifax from 1812 to 1815. Miller died in office at LaHave.

His son Garret Trafalgar Nelson Miller married Maria Frances Ann Morris, also known as the artist Maria Morris Miller.
