= Daniel McNeill Parker =

Canadian politician (1822-1907)

Daniel McNeill Parker (April 28, 1822 – November 4, 1907) was a physician and political figure in Nova Scotia. He served in the Legislative Council of Nova Scotia from 1867 to 1901.

== Biography ==
=== Early life ===
He was born in Windsor, Nova Scotia, the son of Francis Parker and Mary Janet McNeill. Parker was educated at King's College and Horton Academy. He studied medicine with William Bruce Almon and then went on to study at the University of Edinburgh.

=== Career ===
He returned to Nova Scotia in 1845 and set up practice in Halifax. In 1847, he married Eliza Ritchie Johnston, the daughter of James William Johnston. In 1854, he married Fanny Holmes Black after the death of his first wife. His daughter Laura MacNeill Parker was the wife of the 11th Lieutenant Governor of Nova Scotia, the Honourable MacCallum Grant. He helped found the Halifax Institution for the Deaf and Dumb and the Halifax Young Men's Christian Association. Parker also served on the board of governors for Acadia College. He helped establish the Medical Society of Nova Scotia and the Canadian Medical Association and served as president for both. Parker also helped create the faculty of medicine at Dalhousie University. In 1871, he studied antiseptic surgery in Edinburgh and Europe and returned to Nova Scotia as a consultant in those techniques. He retired from practice in 1895.

== Death ==
Parker died in Halifax at the age of 85.
