= George Renny Young =

Canadian politician

George Renny Young (July 4, 1802 – June 30, 1853) was a Scottish-born journalist, lawyer, author and political figure in Nova Scotia. He represented Pictou County in the Nova Scotia House of Assembly from 1843 to 1851.

He was born in Falkirk, the son of John Young and Agnes Renny, and came to Halifax with his family in 1814. He worked with his father for several years before studying at the Pictou Academy. In 1824, he established the Novascotian, or Colonial Herald, a weekly newspaper. He sold the paper in 1827 so that he could devote his time to the study of law. He was admitted to the bar in 1834 and joined his brother William in practice at Halifax. In 1834, he published The British North American colonies to demonstrate to Britain the importance of its colonies. In 1838, he married Jane Brooking in London. In 1842, he published On colonial literature, science and education, a collection of lectures. In 1844, he published The prince and his protégé, a romantic story published in as a serial. He served as a minister without portfolio in the province's Executive Council from 1848 to 1851. In his final years, he suffered from fits of depression, digestive problems and acute pain. Young died in Halifax at the age of 50.
