= Medical Society of Nova Scotia =

Canadian medical society

- Formation: 1854
- Headquarters: Halifax, Nova Scotia
- Region served: Nova Scotia
- Official language: English
- Main organ: Nova Scotia Medical Bulletin

The Medical Society of Nova Scotia, also known as the Nova Scotia Medical Society or the Provincial Medical Board of Nova Scotia, was established in the 19th century, dedicated to advancing the medical profession and health care in Nova Scotia. It is a division of the Canadian Medical Association (CMA).

== History ==
In Halifax, Nova Scotia, the Medical Society of Nova Scotia was established in 1854 as the first medical association in Canada. The Society was incorporated by Act of Provincial Parliament and confirmed by the Hon. George Phipps, 2nd Marquess of Normanby on July 31, 1861.

Sir Charles Tupper was among the Society's founders and held the role of its first president in 1854. Daniel McNeill Parker was also a founding member and in 1857, he served as president. Sir Charles Tupper presided over the Society again after being elected in 1863.

Among those actively involved in the provincial medical society were Tupper, Thomas O. Geddes, George M. Johnston, Charles Aitken, Alexander Lane, Robert Leslie, James Forbes, Alexander McDonald, Edward Jennings, Charles Creed, and Henrie Shaw.

In 1866, Nova Scotia physician William Johnston Almon presided over the society, with James R. DeWolf and Robert Stephen as vice presidents. R.S. Black held the position of treasurer, while Andrew James Cowie served as secretary. Council members included D. McNeil Parker, R.S. Black, Alexander Forrest, and Charles J. Gossip.

By 1888, the name temporarily changed to the Provincial Medical Board of Nova Scotia.

The Society's official publication, The Nova Scotia Medical Bulletin, was published monthly after its establishment in 1922.
