= John Matthew Jones =

British naturalist (1828–1888)

John Matthew Jones FLS FRSC
- Born: John Matthew Jones; 7 October 1828; Montgomery, Montgomeryshire, Wales, United Kingdom
- Died: 7 October 1888 (aged 60); Halifax, Nova Scotia, Canada
- Other name: J.M. Jones
- Occupation: Naturalist

John Matthew Jones (7 October 1828 – 7 October 1888) was a British lawyer and naturalist.

== Early life ==
John Matthew Jones was born in Montgomery, Montgomeryshire, Wales, United Kingdom on 7 October 1828. His father was Rear Admiral Sir Charles Thomas Jones of Fronfraith.

== Career ==
In October 1852, J.M. Jones was appointed to the Royal Montgomeryshire Militia as an ensign under Sir John Conroy, 1st Baronet. Shortly after, he was called to the bar at Middle Temple in London as a barrister-at-law on 6 June 1853.

He moved to America by 1854 before continuing to Bermuda and Nova Scotia, where he investigated native plant life and fish species. John Matthew Jones became a Fellow of the Linnean Society of London in 1859. He was also a Fellow of the Royal Society of Canada.

Jones authored numerous scientific articles and publications on natural history. In 1859, he published a volume of 200 pages under the title "The Naturalist in Bermuda: A Sketch of the Geology, Zoology, and Botany of That Remarkable Group of Islands, Together with Meteorological Observations" in London. The book explored the land animals and plants of Bermuda. He was assisted with the work by Maj. John Walter Wedderburn and John L. Hurdis of Southampton. Collecting in Bermuda for several winters from 1859 to 1876, Jones became the top authority on its natural history. In the early 1860s, he published "Contributions to the Natural History of the Bermudas," edited by George Brown Goode. He and Goode worked to compile complete faunal and floral lists to guide future research in the area.

On 5 January 1863, he was admitted to the Nova Scotian Institute of Natural Science. Elected president of the Nova Scotian Institute of Natural Science on 9 October 1867, he succeeded Philip Carteret Hill. Jones worked alongside vice presidents Dr. John Bernard Gilpin and J.R. DeWolfe and treasurer W.C. Silver. On 4 November 1867, he presented his paper, "Contributions to the Natural History of the Bermudas—Corals and Their Allies."

The 1869 Naturalists' Directory by Frederic Ward Putnam included Jones in both the fish and insects categories.

His work titled "Contributions to the Natural History of Nova Scotia" was published in 1870. Four years later, he released "On the Vegetation of the Bermudas." He wrote "The Visitor's Guide to Bermuda with a Sketch of Its Natural History" around 1876. Jones's work titled "List of the Fishes of Nova Scotia" was published in 1879.

== Personal life ==
In Halifax, Jones married Mary Barr Myers on 23 October 1860. His wife was the youngest daughter of Col. W.J. Myers.

== Death ==
John Matthew Jones died at 60 years old on 7 October 1888 in Halifax, Nova Scotia, Canada.

== Works ==
- The Naturalist in Bermuda: A Sketch of the Geology, Zoology, and Botany of That Remarkable Group of Islands, Together with Meteorological Observations (1859)
- Contributions to the Ichthyology of Nova Scotia (1863)
- Contributions to the Natural History of the Bermudas (1863–67)
- Contributions to the Natural History of Nova Scotia (1865–67)
- On the Geological Features of the Bermudas (1865)
- On some of the Rarer Birds of Nova Scotia (1868)
- Nova Scotia Coleoptera (1869)
- Notes on the Marine Zoology of Nova Scotia (1870)
- Review of Nova Scotian Diurnal Lepidoptera (1870–71)
- On the Vegetation of the Bermudas (1874)
- The Visitor's Guide to Bermuda with a Sketch of Its Natural History (1876)
- Mollusca of Nova Scotia (1877)
- List of the Fishes of Nova Scotia (1879)
- The Mammals of Bermuda (1884)
