= John Leander Starr =

Canadian politician

Magistrate of Halifax
- In office 1826?–1831?

Director of the Bank of British North America
- In office 1832–1836

Member of the Nova Scotia Legislative Council
- In office 1840–1841

Member of the Halifax City Council
- In office 1841–1844

Personal details
- Born: October 25, 1802 Halifax, Nova Scotia
- Died: August 16, 1885 (aged 82) New York City

John Leander Starr (October 25, 1802 – August 16, 1885) was a merchant and political figure in Nova Scotia, Canada.

He was born in Halifax, Nova Scotia, the son of John Starr and Desiah Gore. In 1823, he entered the family business of importing and exporting goods. Also in that year, Starr married Maria Sophia Ratchford. After the death of his father in 1827, he took over the operation of the business. He became magistrate for Halifax and lieutenant-colonel in the local militia. Starr was also involved in the temperance movement. In 1830, he married Frances Throckmorton after the death of his first wife. In 1831, the family business was dissolved to pay for his father's debts. Starr then entered business as an insurance broker. He was also a director of the Bank of British North America, president of the Halifax Gas Light and Water Company and a director of the Bay of Fundy Steam Navigation Company. He employed as a clerk the young Joseph Salter. Starr served as aide-de-camp for two Nova Scotia lieutenant governors and was a master in the Masonic order. He ran unsuccessfully for a seat in the provincial assembly in 1826 and 1836. In 1840, he was named to the province's Legislative Council. He was elected to Halifax city council in 1841. Following a downturn in the economy, Starr was forced into bankruptcy. In 1844, he moved to New York City, where he continued as an insurance broker. He died there in 1885.
