= Nova Scotian Institute of Science =

Research institute in Nova Scotia, Canada

The Nova Scotian Institute of Science (NSIS) is a membership organization promoting science in Nova Scotia. It was founded in 1862 as a direct descendant of the Halifax Mechanics' Institute (1831–1860) and the Halifax Literary and Scientific Society (1839–1862). It is one of the oldest learned societies in Canada. The NSIS was incorporated by an Act of the Nova Scotia Legislature in 1890, the Revised Statutes of Nova Scotia in 1967, and received its first grant from the Legislature in 1867.

Since the early 1800s and into current times, Nova Scotians have been making significant contributions in science and technology, especially for the life sciences, health sciences, and marine sciences. The NSIS maintains a list of famous Nova Scotian scientists and inventions.

The NSIS has been continuously active in its mission of showcasing and communicating science and providing an outlet for original research through its publication and public lectures. It engages in a number of activities, such as publishing The Proceedings of the NSIS (or ‘PNSIS’)—a peer-reviewed scientific journal—and organizing an annual Student Science Writing Competition within Nova Scotia. The PNSIS especially serves as a vehicle for relaying important scientific matters and scientific discoveries within the Canadian maritime region.

Anyone from Nova Scotia and beyond with an interest in science can be a member of the NSIS. At present, society members include both active and retired scientists, students, secondary school teachers, professors, physicians, and members of the general public. Honorary members of the NSIS include Arthur McDonald, Mary Ann White, and Jeffrey Dahn. As of 2024, approximately 120 individuals and institutions are active members of the NSIS.

The PNSIS also sponsors free monthly lectures which are usually presented in-person at a Nova Scotian university and accessible on Zoom. They are also archived on YouTube. On occasion, graduate students from Nova Scotian universities are further invited to give seminars, thereby providing an important outlet for outstanding student research. Further sponsorship has historically been given by the NSIS to scientific conferences and trade fairs in the Maritime provinces (e.g., the annual Sable Island Report, the Fishermen and Scientists Research Society, and the Bay of Fundy Ecosystem Partnership).

Executive members of the NSIS frequently serve as judges for local, regional, and provincial science fairs in Nova Scotia, thus further supporting Nova Scotia’s scientific educational community. The NSIS also regularly organizes excursions for its members and guests, with past field trips including, for example, Joggins Fossil Cliffs, Otter Ponds Demonstration Forest, Purcell Cove Backlands, and Scatarie Island. These outings have elements of scientific interest, and they are an opportunity to share experiences and socialize. They are led either by member volunteers or by subject-matter experts.

== Notable members ==
- Campbell Hardy
