= Lunenburg campaign (1758) =

- Part of the French and Indian War
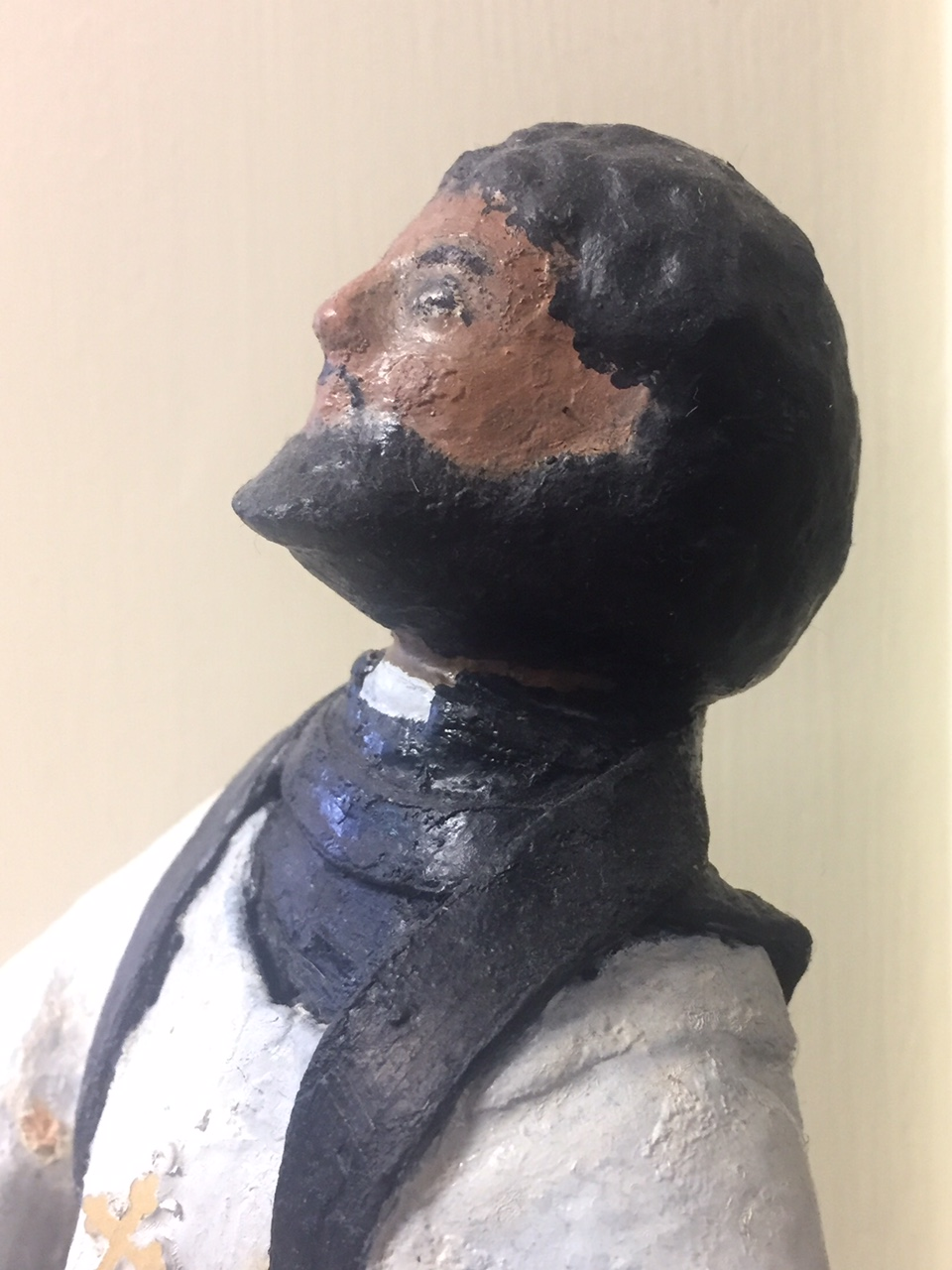
- Jean-Baptiste Moreau, buried many of the 32 killed
Date	March–December 1758
Location	Lunenburg, Nova Scotia

Belligerents
(United Kingdom) Great Britain	Mi'kmaq militia Acadian militia

Commanders and leaders
Lieut-Colonel Patrick Sutherland; Dettlieb Christopher Jessen; Joseph Gorham; Captain Rudolf Faesch (3rd Battalion, 60th Regiment of Foot) Montgomery's regiment Naval Captain Silvanus Cobb	Charles Deschamps de Boishebert; Chief Joseph Labrador; Chief Paul Laurent

Strength
30	unknown

Casualties and losses
32 killed	none

The Lunenburg campaign was executed by the Mi'kmaq militia and Acadian militia against the Foreign Protestants who the British had settled on the Lunenburg Peninsula during the French and Indian War. The British deployed Joseph Gorham and his Rangers along with Captain Rudolf Faesch and regular troops of the 60th Regiment of Foot to defend Lunenburg. The campaign was so successful, by November 1758, the members of the House of Assembly for Lunenburg stated "they received no benefit from His Majesty's Troops or Rangers" and required more protection.

== Historical context ==
Despite the British Conquest of Acadia in 1710, Nova Scotia remained primarily occupied by Catholic Acadians and Mi'kmaq. To prevent the establishment of Protestant settlements in the region, Mi'kmaq raided the early British settlements of present-day Shelburne (1715) and Canso (1720). A generation later, Father Le Loutre's War began when Edward Cornwallis arrived to establish Halifax with 13 transports on June 21, 1749.

By the time Cornwallis had arrived in Halifax, there was a long history of the Wabanaki Confederacy (which included the Mi'kmaq) protecting their land by killing British civilians along the New England/ Acadia border in Maine (See the Northeast Coast campaigns 1688, 1703, 1723, 1724, 1745, 1746, 1747).

The British quickly began to build other settlements. To guard against Mi'kmaq, Acadian, and French attacks on the new Protestant settlements, British fortifications were erected in Halifax (Citadel Hill) (1749), Bedford (Fort Sackville) (1749), Dartmouth (1750), Lunenburg (1753) and Lawrencetown (1754). There were numerous Mi'kmaq and Acadian raids on these villages such as the Raid on Dartmouth (1751).

After the Raid on Lunenburg (1756), Governor Lawrence sought to protect the area by establishing blockhouses at the LaHave River, Mush-a-Mush (at present day Blockhouse, Nova Scotia) and at the Northwest Range (present day Northwest, Nova Scotia). Despite the protection of these blockhouses, Indians and Acadians continued raiding the area, executing eight such raids over the next three years. A total of 32 people from Lunenburg were killed in the raids with more being taken prisoner. The British reported that most of these raids were by the Mi'kmaq and Acadians at Cape Sable. (The Argyle, Nova Scotia region was formerly known as Cape Sable and encompassed a much larger area than it does today. It extended from Cape Negro (Baccaro) through Chebogue.)

Following the raid of 1756, Mi'kmaq made eight more raids on the Lunenburg Peninsula over the next three years. In 1757, the Mi'kmaq raided Lunenburg and killed six people from the Brissang family. That same year, the Lunenburg settlers were compelled to do "much militia duty". During the winter, 300 soldiers under the command of former governor, now Major General, Hopson's were stationed at Lunenburg. In April 1757, a band of Acadian and Mi'kmaq partisans raided a warehouse near-by Fort Edward, killing thirteen British soldiers and, after taking what provisions they could carry, setting fire to the building. A few days later, the same partisans also raided Fort Cumberland. Because of the strength of the Acadian militia and Mi'kmaq militia, British officer John Knox wrote that "In the year 1757 we were said to be Masters of the province of Nova Scotia, or Acadia, which, however, was only an imaginary possession." He continues to state that the situation in the province was so precarious for the British that the "troops and inhabitants" at Fort Edward, Fort Sackville and Lunenburg "could not be reputed in any other light than as prisoners."

By year end, Governor Charles Lawrence wrote, "More inhabitants were killed and taken prisoner, by which many were too much exposed, and others apprehensive of danger. The people much discouraged, and in great distress." (By June 1757, the settlers of another Halifax satellite settlement, Lawrencetown, had to be withdrawn completely again from the settlement because the number of Mi'kmaq and Acadian raids eventually prevented settlers from leaving their houses). Of the 151 settlers who arrived in Dartmouth in August 1750, after Mi'kmaq and Acadia raids half of the settlers left the community within two years later. By the end of war (1763), Dartmouth was only left with 78 settlers.

== Campaign ==
The following year, March 1758, the Mi'kmaq raided the Lunenburg Peninsula at the Northwest Range (present-day Blockhouse, Nova Scotia) and killed five people from the Ochs and Roder families. On 15 May 1758, Captain Faesch left Halifax for Lunenburg with troops of the 60th Regiment and an order was given for Sutherland to join the forces en route to Louisbourg. Acadian privateers attacked shipping off of Lunenburg. By the end of May 1758, most of those on the Lunenburg Peninsula abandoned their farms and retreated to the protection of the fortifications around the town of Lunenburg, losing the season for sowing their grain. For those that did not leave their farms for the town, the number of raids intensified.

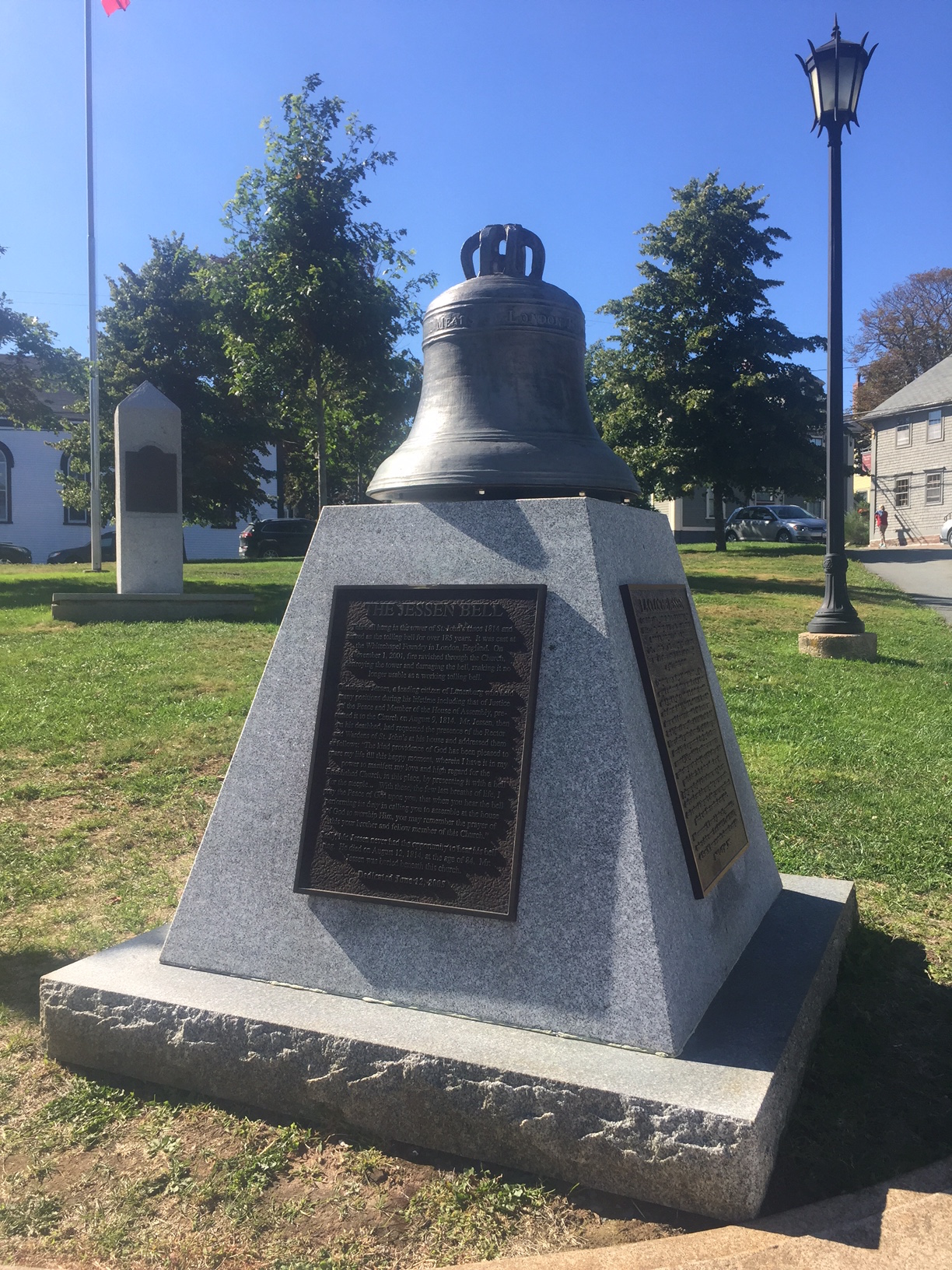
D.C. Jessen led the militia – The Jessen Bell, St. John's Anglican Church (Lunenburg), Nova Scotia

During the summer of 1758, in response to the British Siege of Louisbourg (1758), Mi'kmaq conducted four raids on the Lunenburg Peninsula. On July 13, 1758, a member of the Labrador family killed two boys on the LaHave River. The next raid happened at Mahone Bay, Nova Scotia on August 24, 1758, when eight Mi'kmaq attacked the family homes of Lay and Brant. While they killed three people in the raid, the Mi'kmaq were unsuccessful in taking their scalps, which was the common practice for payment from the French. Two days, later, two soldiers were killed in a raid on the blockhouse at LaHave, Nova Scotia. On August 27, Joseph Stye along with Conrad Halty and his wife were buried after being scalped.

On September 8, D.C. Jessen led 60 militia and forty troops from the 60th Regiment around the peninsula for a week to scout for Mi'kmaq, which they did not find. During that time, on September 11, Mi'kmaq captured a child in a raid on the Northwest Range.

After the Siege of Louisbourg (1758), Gorham's Rangers were stationed at Lunenburg for the winter. (Joseph Gorham owned 300 acres of land at Lunenburg: land still named Gorham Point at the end of present-day Second Peninsula, two islands nearby, a peninsula leading from the community of Mahone Bay as well as the Seven Islands, near Sacrifice Island in Mahone Bay.) Despite the presence of Gorham's Rangers and the 60th Regiment, in December Lawrence wrote to the Lords of Trade, that the Mi'kmaq "had just destroyed a whole family remarkable for their industry, and that in so bloody and barbarous a manner as to terrify and drive three parts of the people from their county lots into the town for protection."

== Afterward ==
The raids continued the following spring. One raid happened on March 27, 1759, in which three members of the Oxner family were killed. The last raid happened on April 20, 1759. The Mi'kmaq killed four settlers at Lunenburg who were members of the Trippeau and Crighton families. In a letter to the Lords of Trade dated 20 September 1759, Lawrence continued to comment on the raids by Mi'kmaq and Acadians slowing the development of the community. Again, Acadian privateers attacked shipping off of Lunenburg.

Rev. Jean-Baptiste Moreau was the minister at Lunenburg who buried many of the dead. He reported that the Mi'kmaq killed 32 people in the campaign.

Chief Paul Laurent of the LaHave Tribe arrived in Halifax after surrendering to the British at Fort Cumberland on 29 February 1760 and signed a Halifax Treaty on 10 March 1760.
