= Jean Pettrequin =

Canadian carpenter who instigated an uprising

Jean Pettrequin (Note: His last name is also spelt Petrequin) (c. 1724–1764) was a carpenter who immigrated to Lunenburg, Nova Scotia. He claimed to receive a letter that promised additional supplies to the town; this letter subsequently instigated an uprising in the town.

== Biography ==
Pettrequin immigrated to Lunenberg, Nova Scotia, with German and Swiss Protestant settlers in 1752, after overcrowding in Halifax necessitated the migration of these immigrants to other parts of the colony. Each settler was given 50 acres of land in which they did not have to pay taxes on them for 10 years.

In his first winter in the town, Pettrequin claimed that a sailor brought him a letter from a cousin in England. Since he was illiterate, the sailor told Pettrequin that the letter described how the British parliament ordered supplies for Lunenberg and his cousin was asking Pettrequin if the supplies had arrived. In November he asked a schoolmaster to write a reply to the letter, but when the schoolmaster asked to see the letter Pettrequin stated that he was forbidden to show it to anyone. Rumours spread throughout the town about the contents of this letter, and other townsfolk pressured Pettrequin to show them the letter. Pettrequin promised that he would produce the letter on 16 December.

A group of townsfolk, disenchanted with their living conditions, demanded to see the letter, which Pettrequin refused to do. On 15 December, Pettrequin was detained in a blockhouse by the mob. When government officials investigated, Pettrequin claimed he did not know why the mob had seized him. Patrick Sutherland secured Pettrequin's release, but he was subsequently recaptured and returned to the blockhouse. The mob interrogated him to determine the location of the letter; when this was unsuccessful, they tortured him for the information. Pettrequin claimed that he sold the letter to the town's magistrate Sebastian Zouberbuhler. At this point Pettrequin was untied, but still detained by the mob. The following day, he told a member of the mob that he had first asked Zouberbuhler to send a reply to his cousin's letter, but Zouberbuhler threatened Pettrequin to obtain the letter. Pettrequin then claimed that when he asked for the letter to be returned, Zouberbuhler claimed that his wife had burned the letter and that Pettrequin should not reveal the contents of the letter to others.

At a subsequent hearing, Pettrequin claimed that another settler, John William Hoffman, told him that a letter was sent from a sailor in Halifax. Hoffman encouraged Pettrequin to respond to the letter and tell the town of its contents. Hoffman was subsequently convicted of false libel and inciting a riot; Pettrequin's testimony was used to obtain this verdict. Researchers do not have details of Pettrequin's life after 1754.
