= Jean-Baptiste Moreau =

Jean-Baptiste Moreau may refer to:

- Jean-Baptiste Moreau (composer)
- Jean-Baptiste Moreau (clergyman)
- Jean-Baptiste Moreau (politician)
