= Francis Joseph Rudolf =

Canadian politician

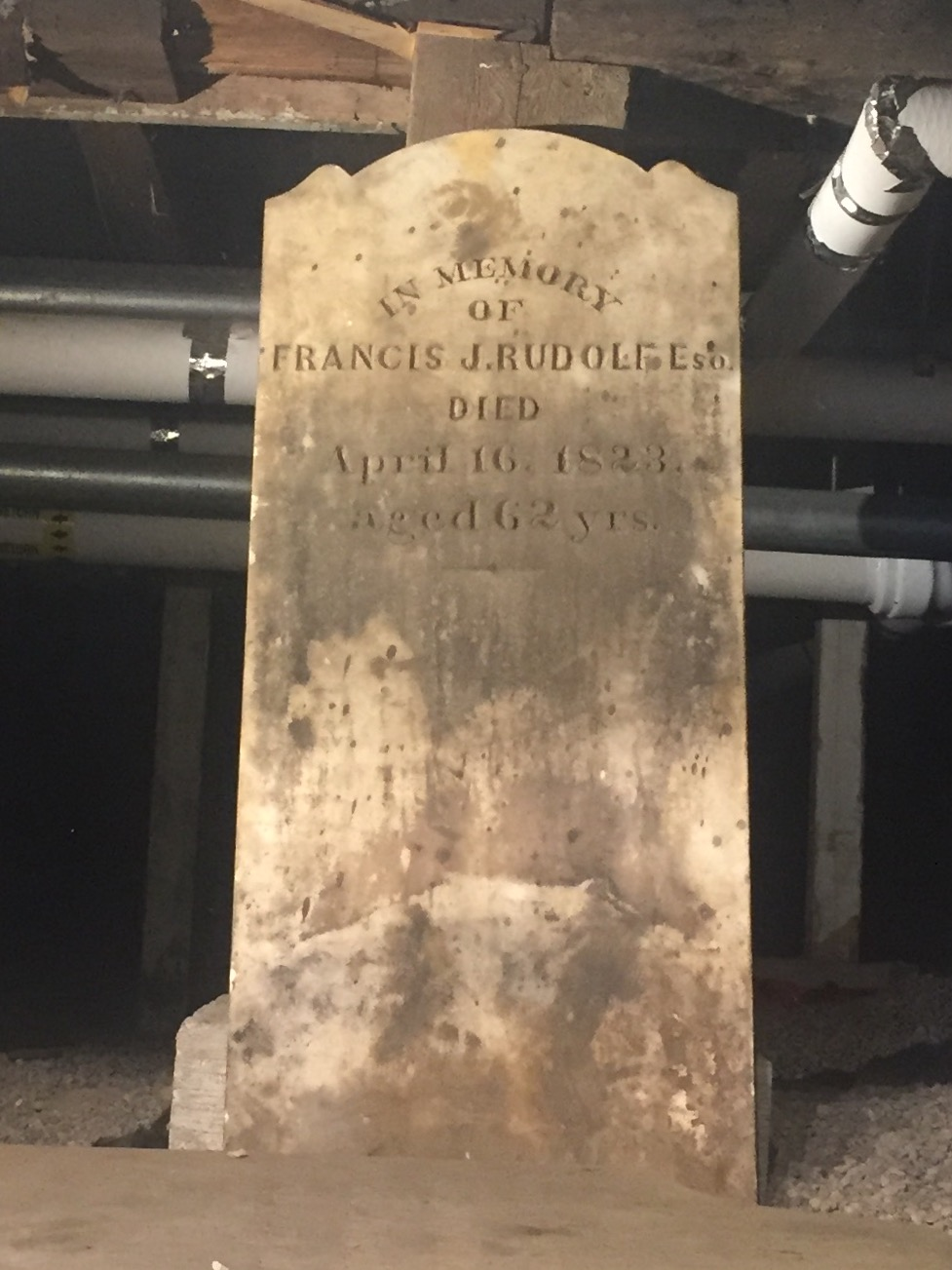
Francis Rudolf, The Crypt, St. John's Anglican Church, Lunenburg, Nova Scotia

Francis Joseph Rudolf (May 10, 1761 – April 16, 1823) was a judge and political figure in Nova Scotia. He represented Lunenburg County in the Nova Scotia House of Assembly from 1811 to 1820.

He was born in Lunenburg, Nova Scotia, the son of Leonard Christopher Rudolf. In 1803, he married Mary Elizabeth Zwicker. Rudolf served as a justice of the peace and was custos rotulorum from 1819 to 1823. He was named a justice in the Inferior Court of Common Pleas in 1808. He died in Lunenburg at the age of 61 and is buried in the crypt of St. John's Anglican Church (Lunenburg).
