= Robert Vincent (priest) =

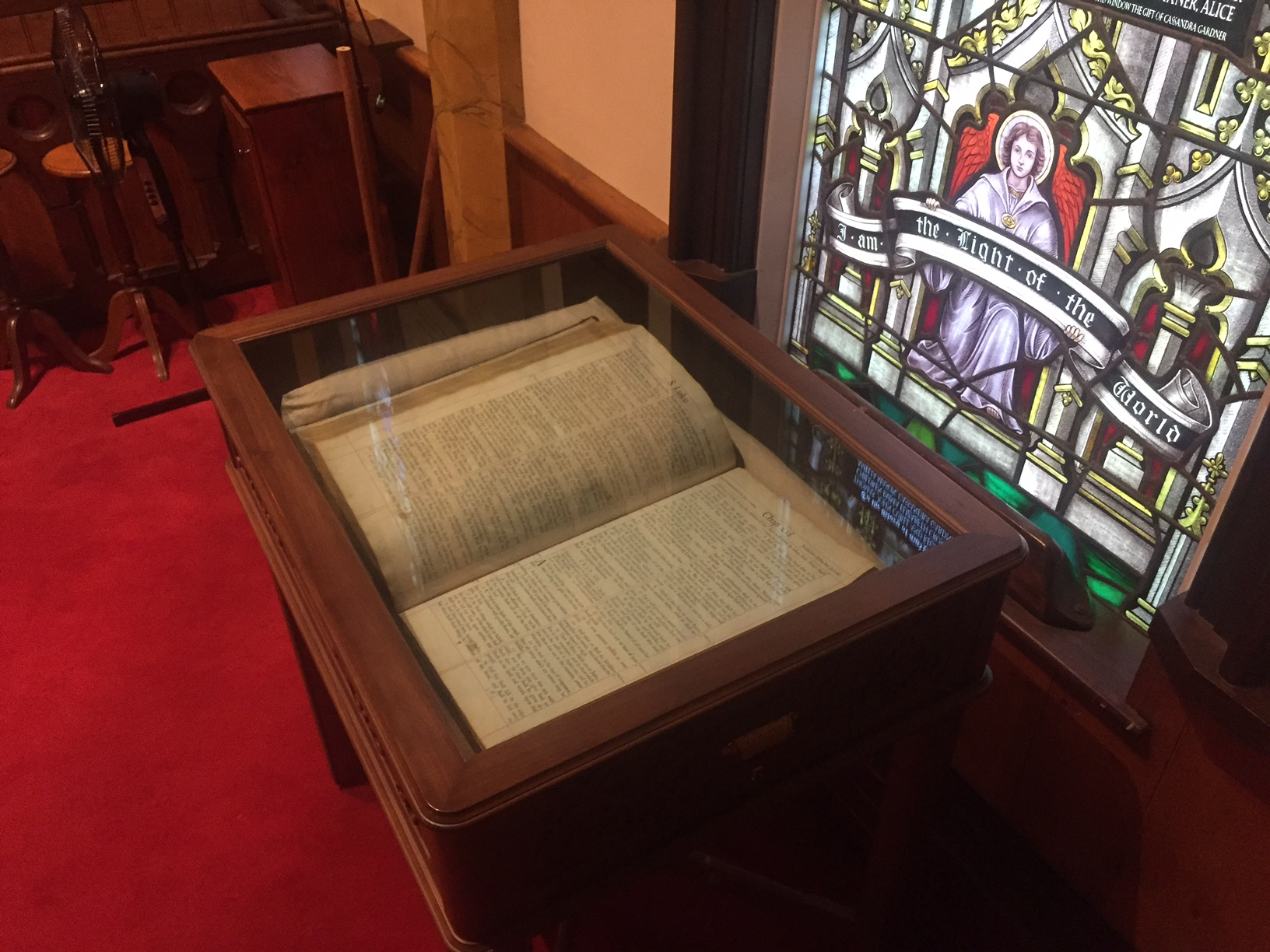
Michael Francklin's Bible, originally owned by Vincent

Robert Vincent (died 1765) was an Anglican priest who served as the second minister of St. John's Anglican Church, Lunenburg, Nova Scotia (1761–1765). He was also the school master of Lunenburg. He was buried in the Old Burying Ground in Halifax, Nova Scotia.
