= John Creighton (judge) =

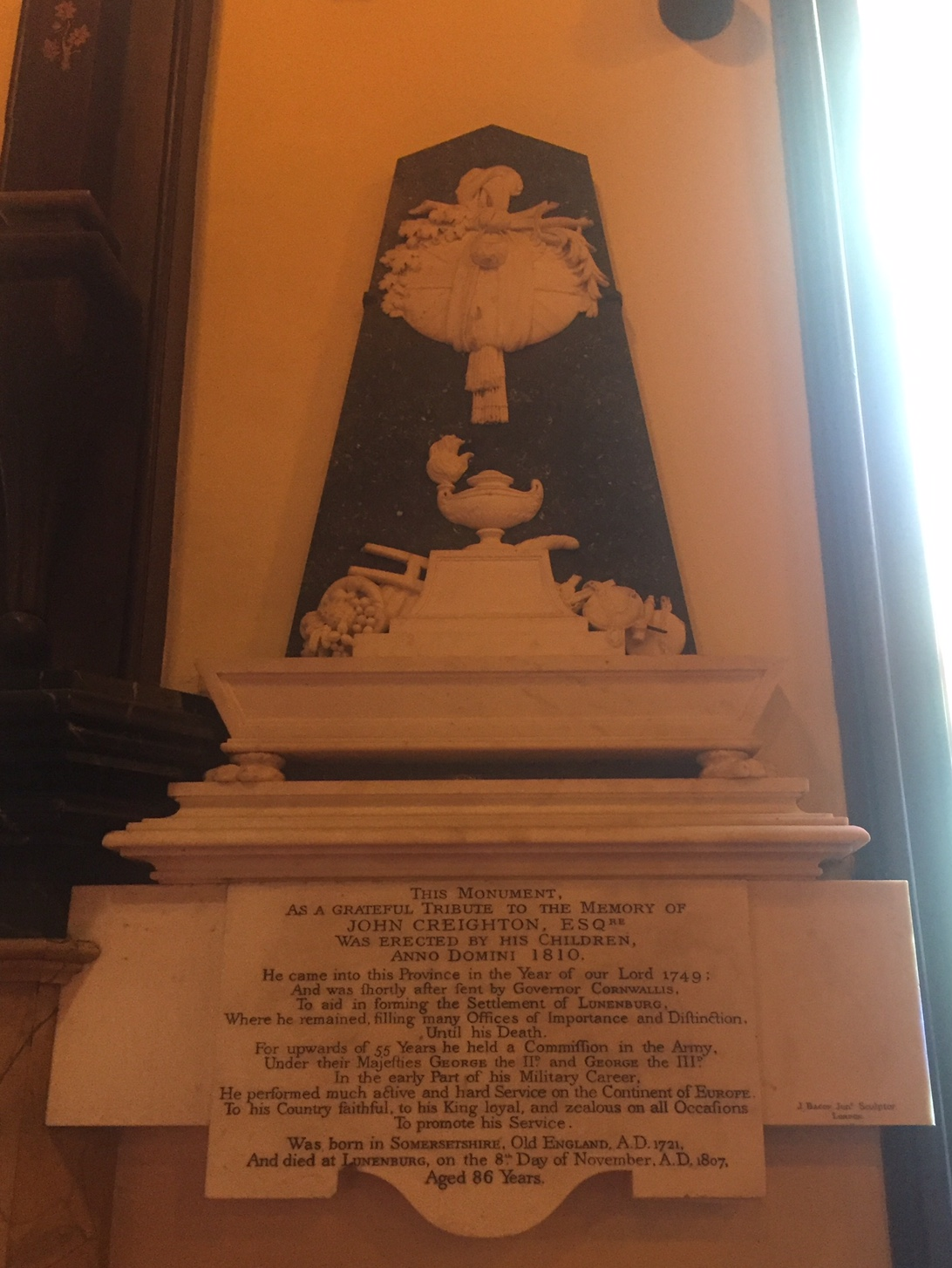
- John Creighton Sr., St. John's Anglican Church, Lunenburg, Nova Scotia
- Born: 1721; Glastonbury
- Died: November 8, 1807 (aged 85/86); Lunenburg, Nova Scotia
- Occupation: Judge

John Creighton (1721 – November 8, 1807) was one of the founding fathers of Lunenburg, Nova Scotia. He led the settlement through the turbulent times of Father Le Loutre's War, the French and Indian War and the American Revolution. He represented Lunenburg County in the Nova Scotia House of Assembly from 1770 to 1775. After establishing the town, he lived the rest of his life in the village until he died fifty-four years later.

The stone monument to John Creighton in St. John's Anglican Church (Lunenburg) was created by John Bacon (1777–1859), a nineteenth century sculptor. (Bacon created six monuments in St. Paul's Cathedral and many in Westminster Abbey.)

== Career ==
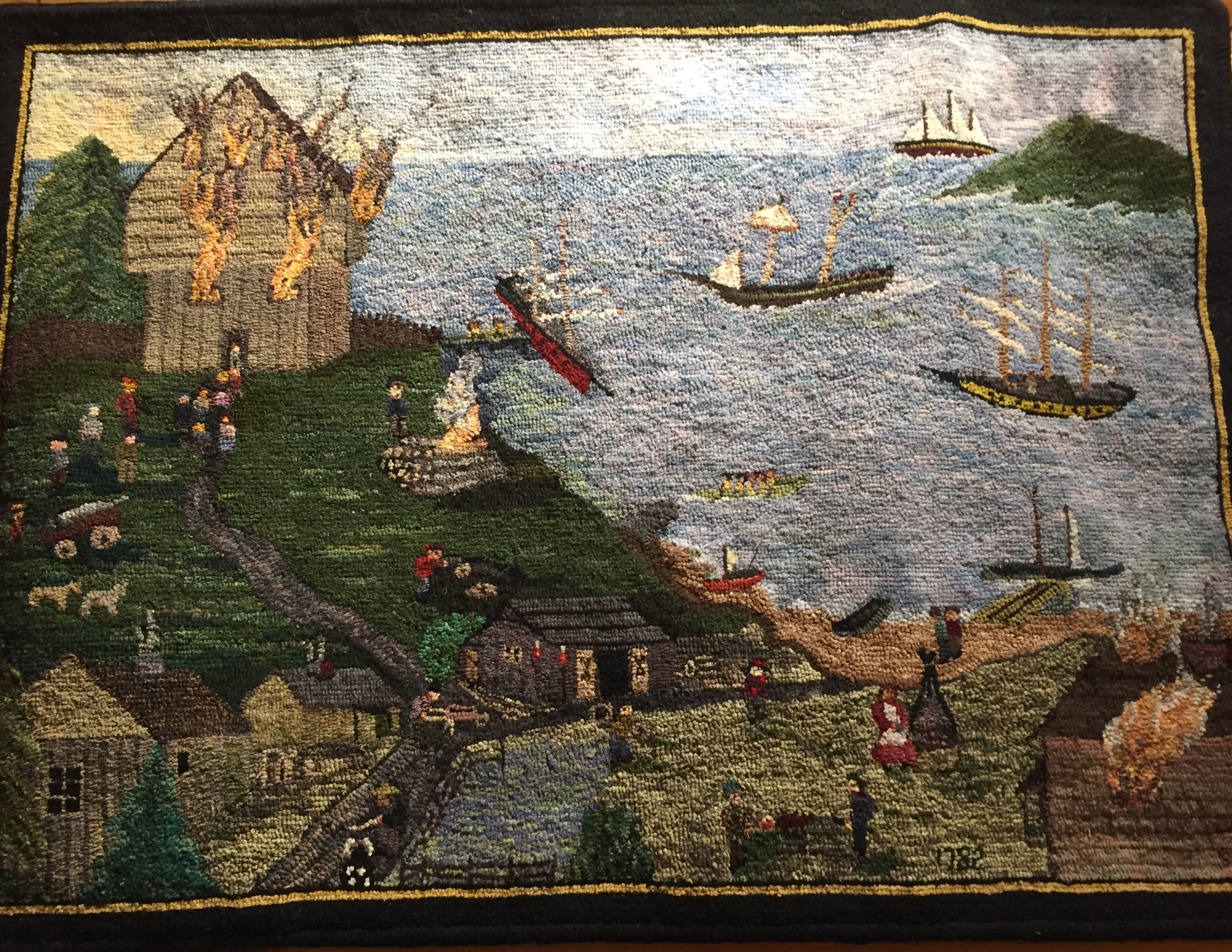
American Privateers burned blockhouse (top left) and John Creighton's home (bottom right), The Sacking of Lunenburg by Suzanne Conrad, Rug Hooking Museum of North America, Queensland, Nova Scotia

He was born in Glastonbury and served as a lieutenant in the British dragoons. In 1749, he went with Edward Cornwallis to Halifax. He served in Cornwallis' militia. In 1753, he relocated to Lunenburg. Creighton was a justice of the peace and captain in the militia; he later became lieutenant-colonel. In 1753, he was named a judge in the Inferior Court of Common Pleas and, in 1776, he was named a judge for the probate court. He was unsuccessful when he ran for a seat in the first election held in Nova Scotia, but did get elected to the 5th General Assembly of Nova Scotia in 1770. In 1775, he was named to the province's Council, but he was only able to attend infrequently, and his seat was vacated in 1788 after not having appeared since 1785.

He led the armed resistance to American privateers in the Raid on Lunenburg (1782). He and five others defended the town by firing at the privateers from the Blockhouse, wounding three of them. The privateers captured Creighton and the five men, two of whom escaped. The privateers burned the blockhouse and Creighton's home. Creighton and the three others were taken captive to Boston. The lead privateer Noah Stoddard would later report of his prisoner Creighton that "I have a great regard for the old gentleman." He eventually returned and died in Lunenburg in 1807 and is buried in the crypt in St. John's Anglican Church (Lunenburg).

== Personal life ==
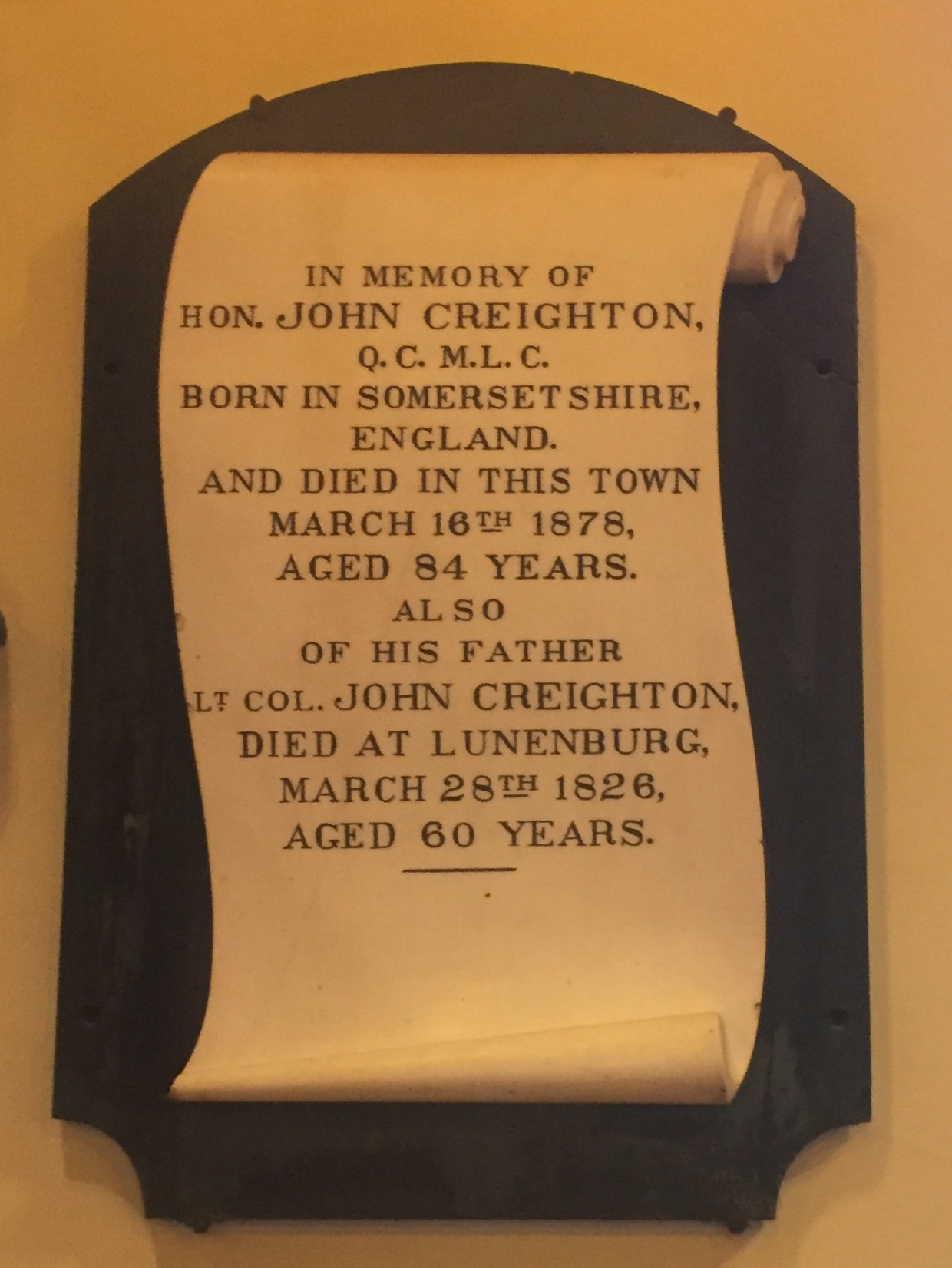
Plaque to John Creighton's son and grandson John Creighton, St. John's Anglican Church (Lunenburg), Nova Scotia

Creighton married Lucy Clapp in 1760 after the death of his first wife, Maria. His daughter Lucy married Hibbert Newton Binney (buried in the Old Burying Ground (Halifax, Nova Scotia)) and his daughter Sarah married Lewis Morris Wilkins. His grandson, also named John Creighton, also served in the province's assembly.

== See also ==
- Dettlieb Christopher Jessen
- Patrick Sutherland
- Jean-Baptiste Moreau (clergyman)
- Sebastian Zouberbuhler
