= St. John's Anglican Church (Lunenburg) =

Church in Lunenburg, Nova Scotia, Canada

Coordinates: 44.3781°N 64.3112°W

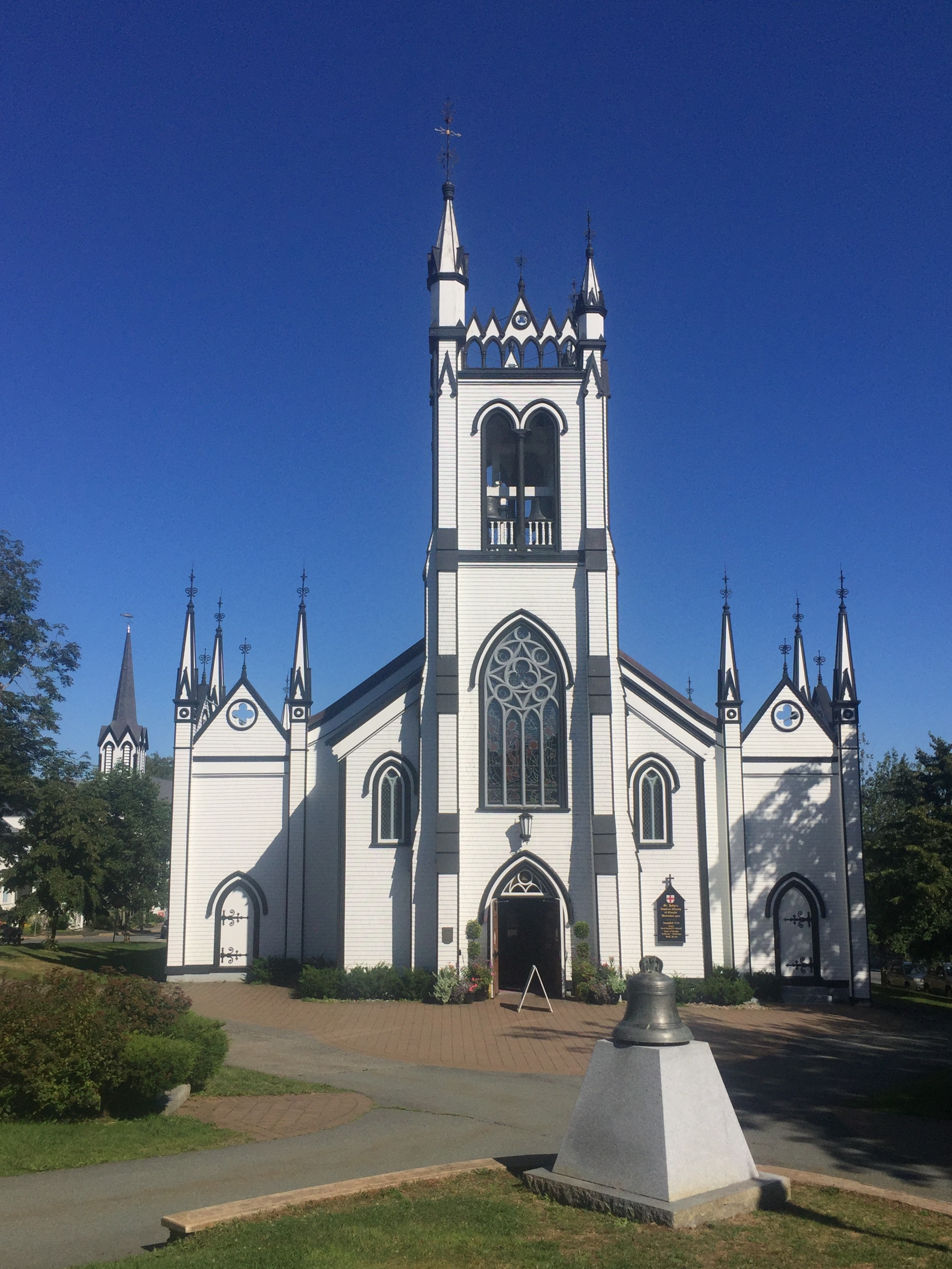
St. John's Anglican Church, Lunenburg, Nova Scotia; The Jessen Bell (1814) in the foreground

St. John's Anglican Church was the first church established in Lunenburg, Nova Scotia, Canada (1753). It is the second Church of England built in Nova Scotia, and is the second oldest continuous Protestant church in present-day Canada. Early on 1 November 2001, St. John's church suffered significant damage by fire. It was restored and re-dedicated June 12, 2005.

The early congregation was mainly Foreign Protestants, including Lutheran Germans. The first missionary was sent by the Society for the Propagation of the Gospel was the Rev. Jean-Baptiste Moreau (clergyman) (who is buried in the crypt below the church). Dettlieb Christopher Jessen donated a church bell that is displayed on the church grounds. (Jessen had the bell made by the Whitechapel Bell Foundry in London, the same company that made Big Ben and the Liberty Bell.) Jessen also donated a silver Paten and Chalice to the church (1814). Bells in the tower were given by Lt. Col. Charles Edwin Kaulbach (1902). Rev. Roger Aitken completed the rectory for the church on Townsend Street (c.1816). The stone monument to John Creighton Sr. in the church was created by John Bacon (1777–1859), a nineteenth century sculptor. He created six monuments in St. Paul's Cathedral and many in Westminster Abbey.

The church is part of the Diocese of Nova Scotia and Prince Edward Island in the Anglican Church of Canada. The parish welcomed their first female rector, the Rev. Dr. Laura Marie Piotrowicz, in January 2019.

== Church building ==
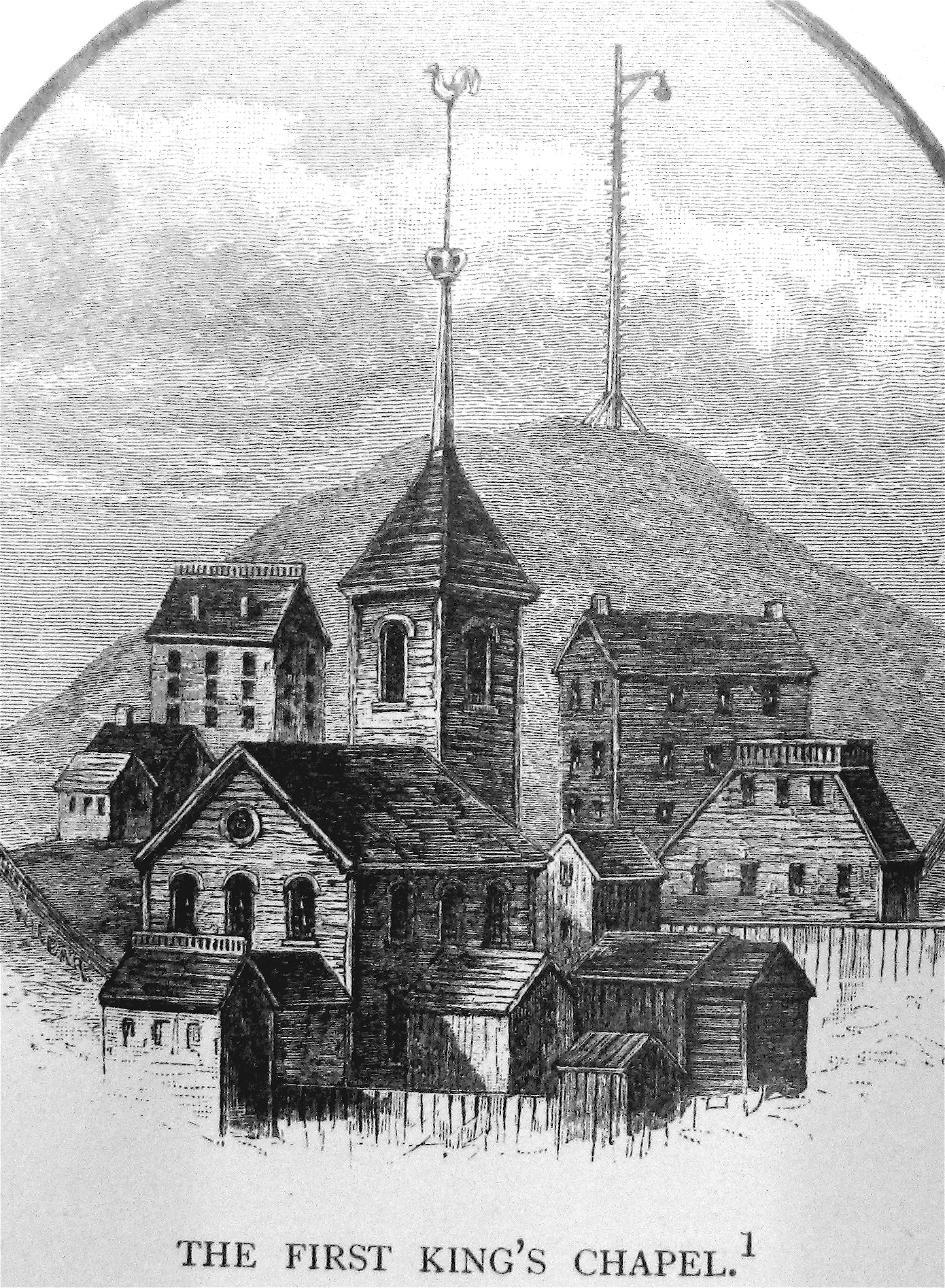
Original King's Chapel – disassembled and its lumber used to build St. John's

St. John's Church was built during the French and Indian War, using the wood salvaged from an older disassembled church building. When King's Chapel in Boston, Massachusetts, was expanded, its new stone structure was built around its original wooden church, which continued to be used. Then, when that new stone building was completed in 1754, King's Chapel's old wooden frame was disassembled from inside, removed through the new building's windows, and shipped to Lunenburg. Early on 1 November 2001, St. John's church suffered significant damage by fire. It was restored and re-dedicated June 12, 2005. During reconstruction a mystery emerged concerning numerous stars painted within the Church, and which subsequently garnered the interest of international media and astronomers, as the remarkable star scene over the apse may convey the night-sky on the first Christmas (some 2 millennia ago) as seen from Lunenburg.

In 2005, the church contributed wood from a salvaged pew to the Six String Nation project. Parts of that material serve multiple functions within Voyageur, the guitar at the heart of the project, including a back brace, a reinforcing strip and kerfing, all on the interior of the instrument.

=== Crypt ===
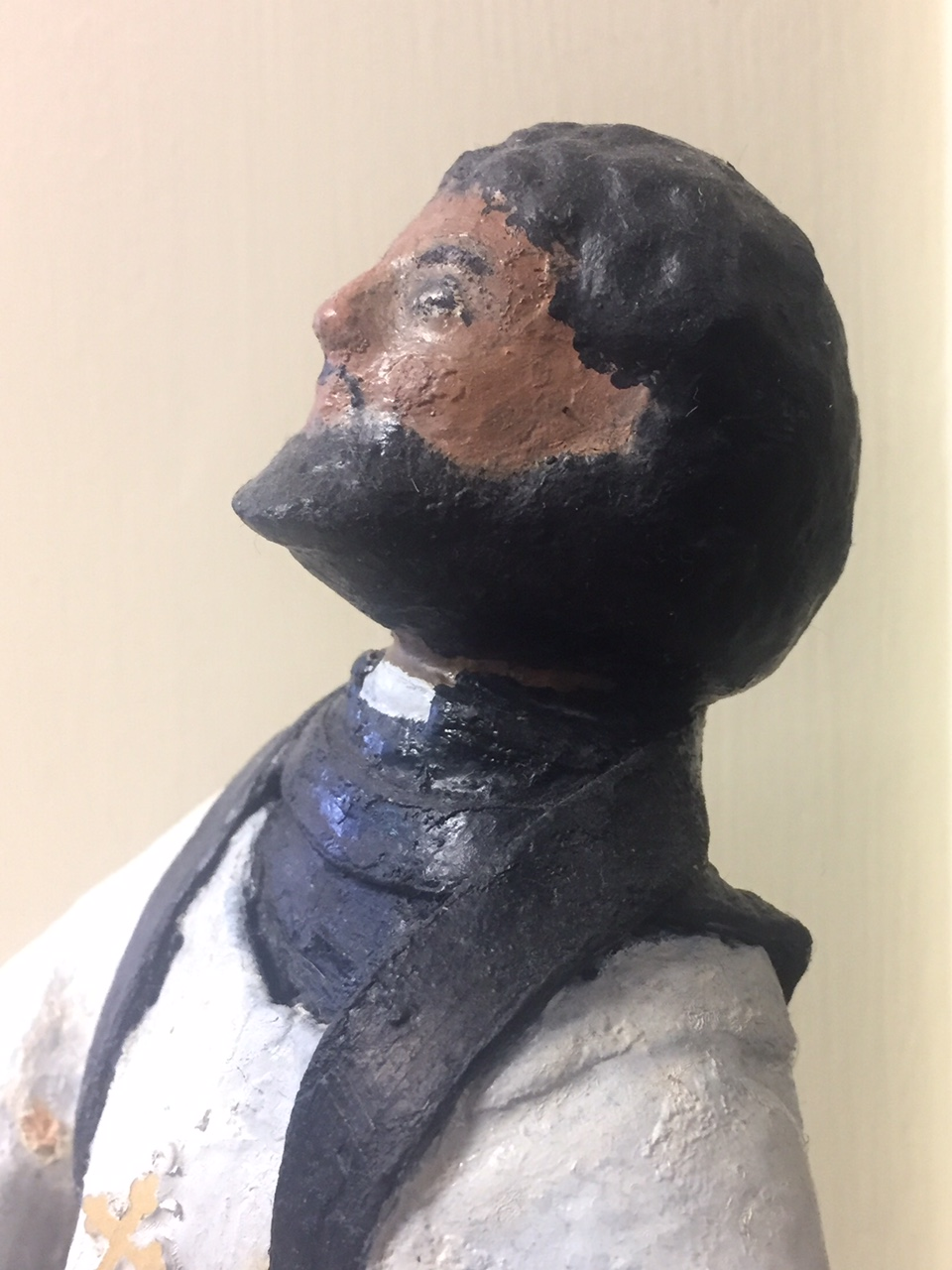
Rev. Jean-Baptiste Moreau, lead statue by Arthur W. Schwartz, St. John's Anglican Church, Lunenburg, Nova Scotia (c. 1935)

There are 18 people buried in the crypt. 7 people are under age 17. The notable interments include:

==== Founders of Lunenburg ====
- Dettlieb Christopher Jessen, (d. 1814), fought in the Raid on Lunenburg (1782), donated church bell and silver chalice; wife of Jessen, Francisca Barbara (Rudolf) Jessen (d. 1807)
- John Creighton Sr. (d. 1806), fought in the Raid on Lunenburg (1782)
- Hon. Sebastian Zouberbuhler, (d.1773), fought in the Siege of Louisbourg (1745); became first of 3 Justice of the Peace in Lunenburg along with John Creighton and Patrick Sutherland.
- Rev. Jean-Baptiste Moreau (clergyman) (d.1770), 1st minister

==== Others ====
- Rev. Paulus Bryzelius (d. 1773), minister
- Rev. Thomas Shreve (d. 1816), minister; soldier during the American Revolution
- John Creighton Jr. (d. 1826)
- Honorable Francis Joseph Rudolf (d. 1823)
- son of Rev. Peter de la Roche, William (age 1, d. 1776)
- Miss Margaret Cheyne (1748–1821)

== Ministers (1753–1852) ==
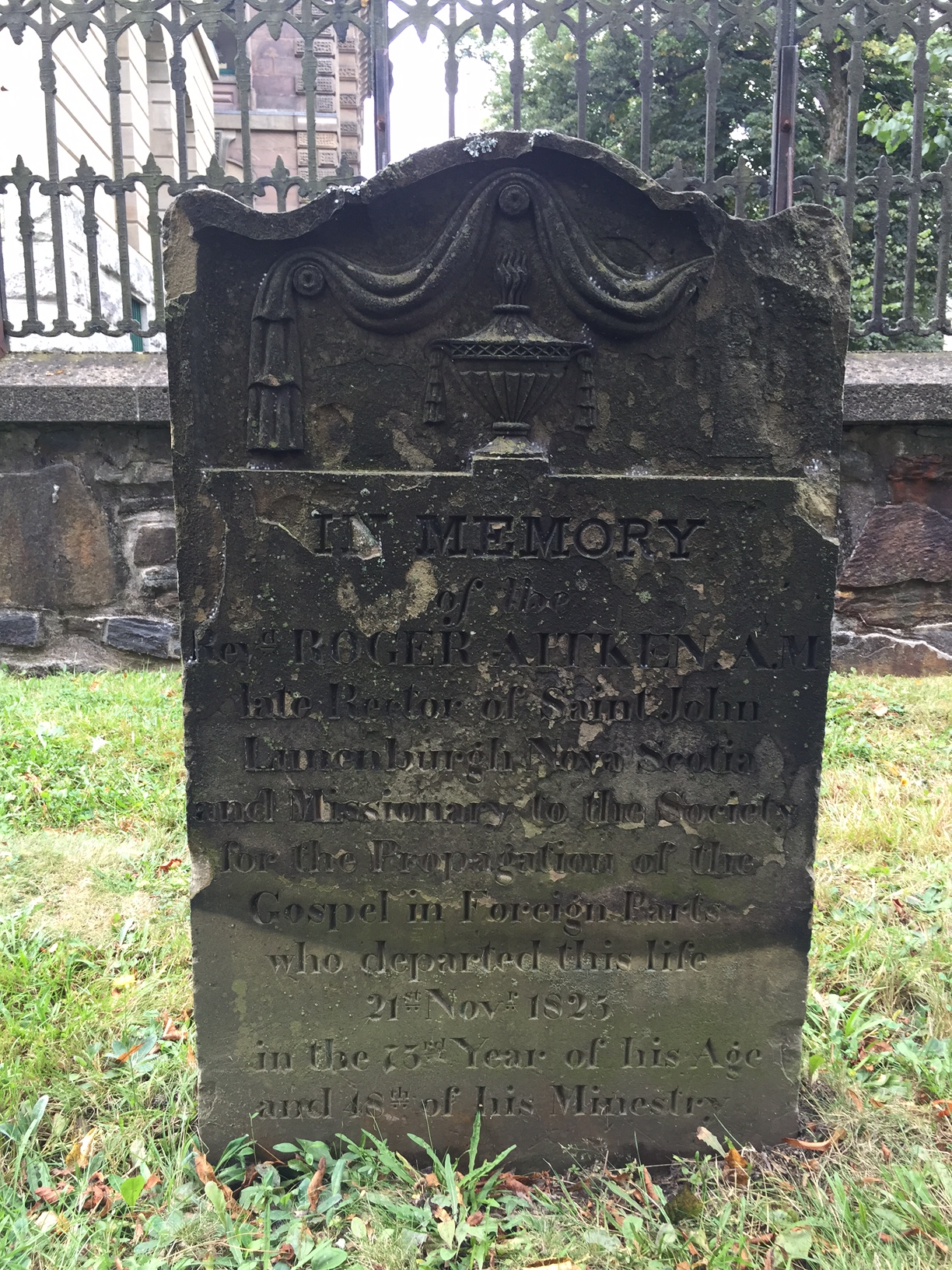
Rev. Roger Aitken (d. 1825), missionary at Lunenburg for Society for the Propagation of the Gospel in Foreign Parts (1817–1825), Old Burying Ground (Halifax, Nova Scotia)

- Rev. Jean-Baptiste Moreau (1753–1770);
- Rev. Robert Vincent (clergyman) (1762–1765)
- Rev. Paulus Bryzelius (1768–1773)
- Rev. Peter de la Roche (1771–1787), signed ransom agreement with American privateers in the Raid on Lunenburg (1782) and became first Anglican minister at Guysborough, Nova Scotia.
- Rev. Richard Money (1787–1803)
- Rev. Thomas Shreve (1804–1816)
- Rev. Roger Aitken (1817–1825)
- Rev. James Cuppaidge Cochran (1825–1852), who supported the establishment of the Halifax School for the Deaf

== Gallery ==
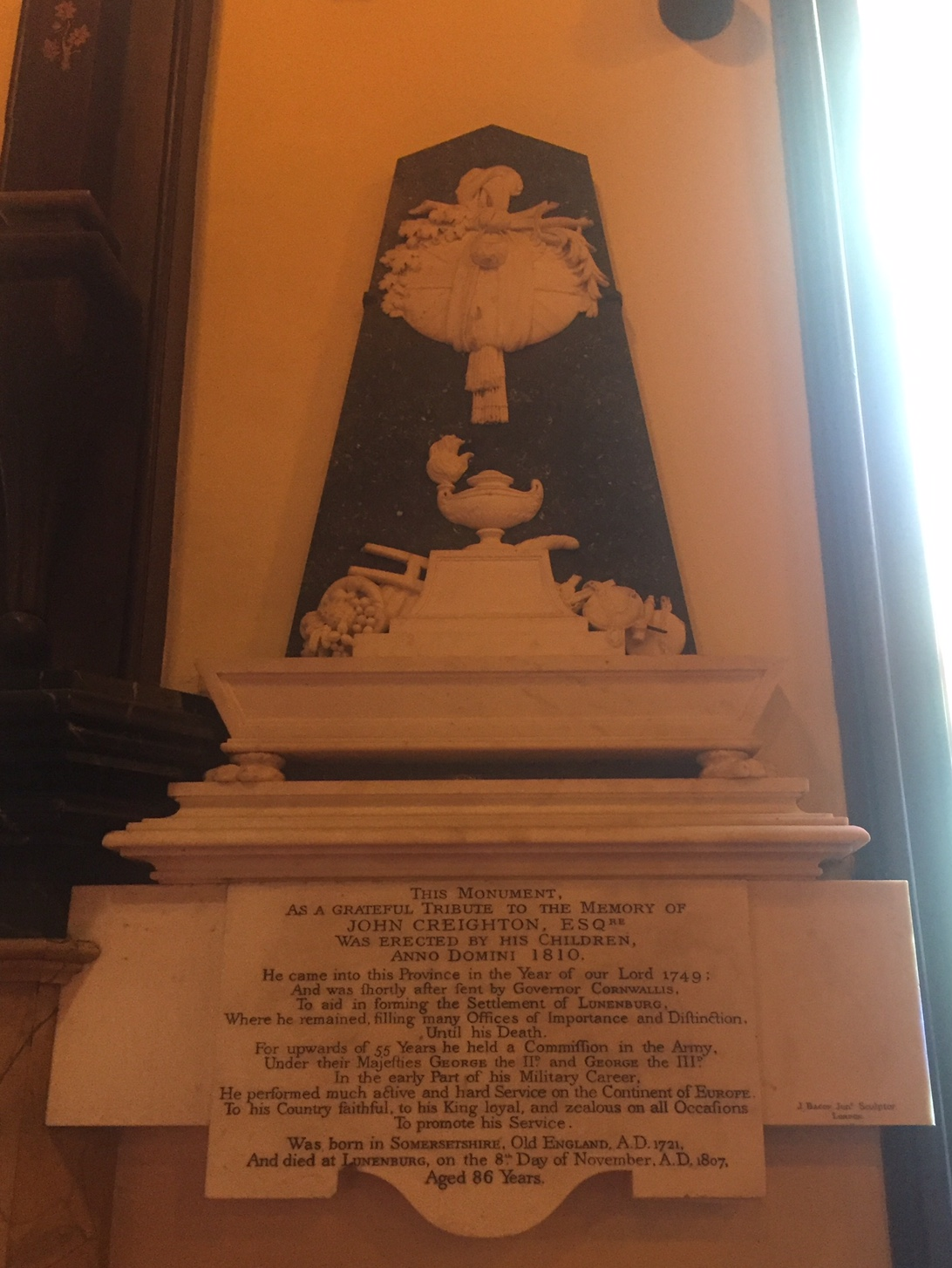
John Creighton Sr. monument by John Bacon, London

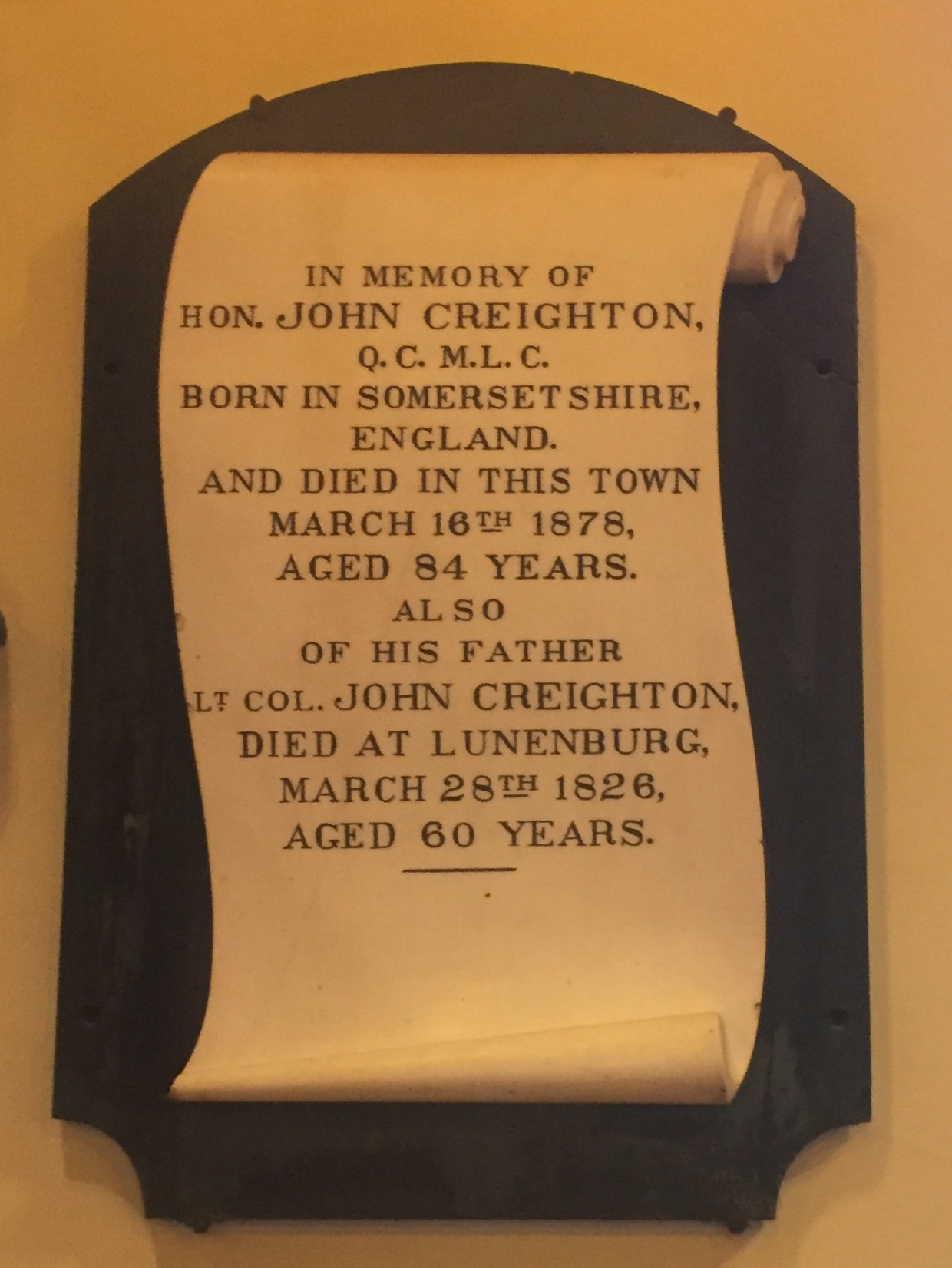
Plaque to John Creighton Jr. and his son John Creighton

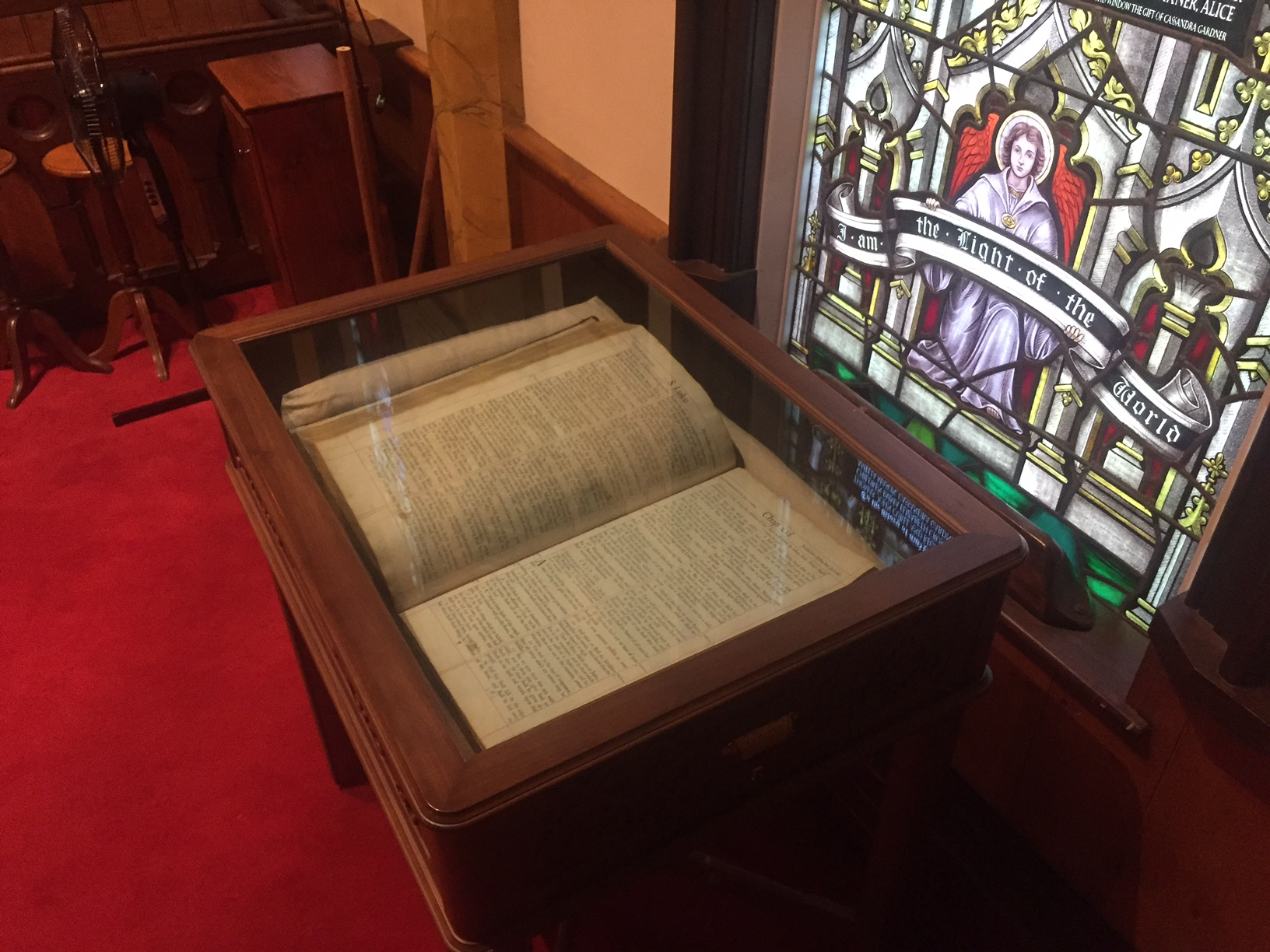
Governor Michael Francklin's Bible (1765); originally owned by Rev. Robert Vincent, second minister of St. John's (.c. 1761)

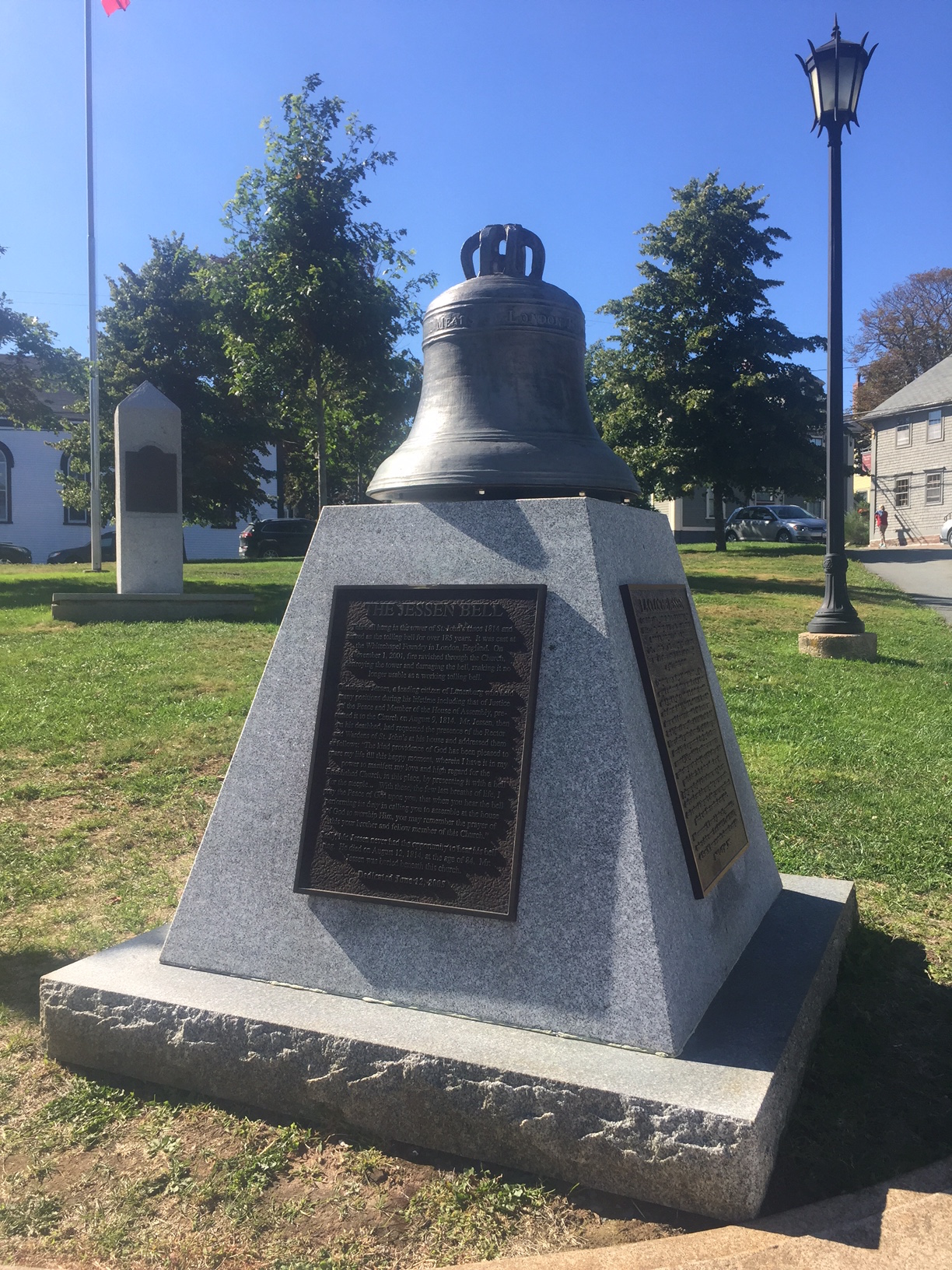
The Jessen Bell (1814)

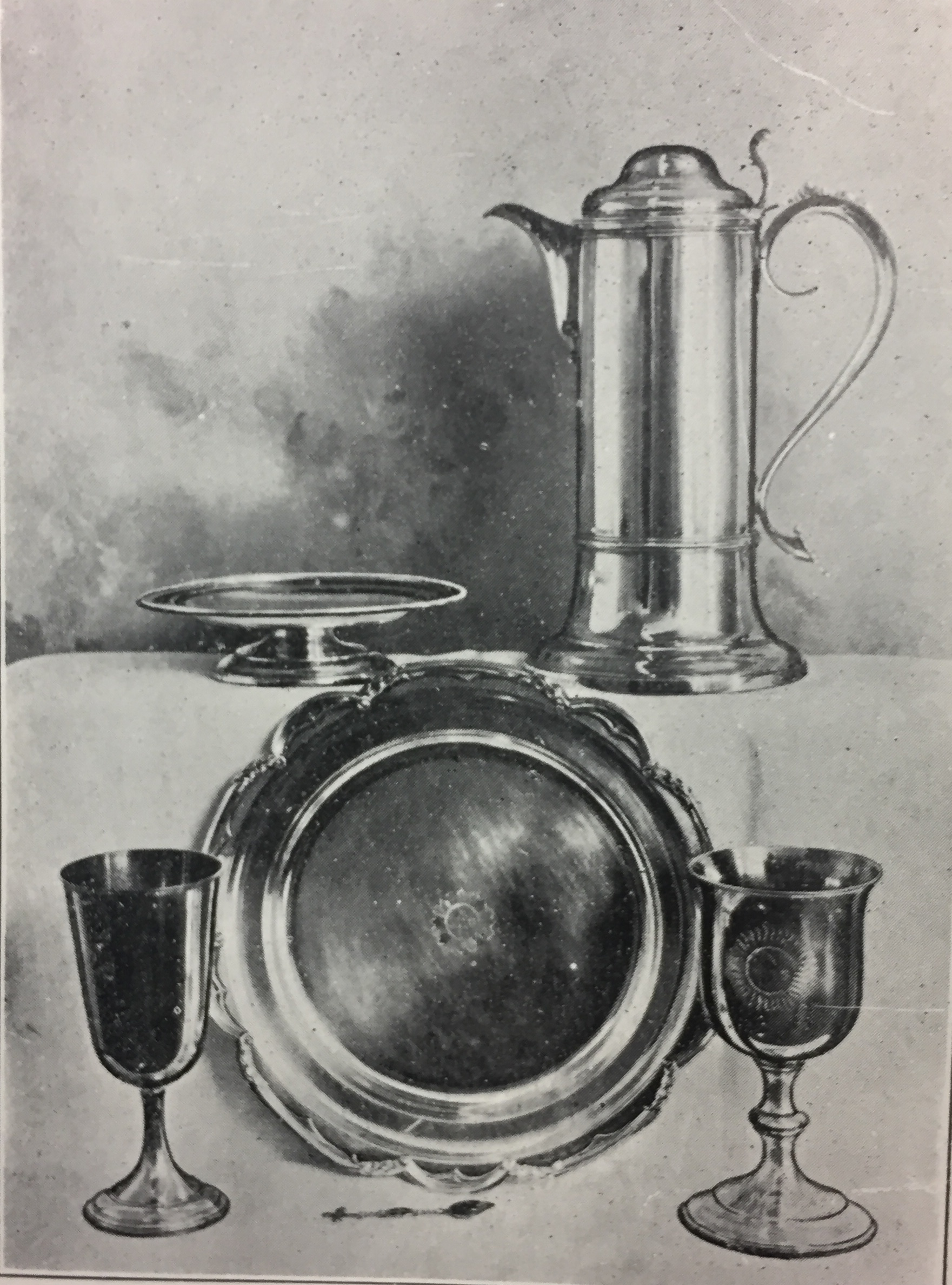
Jessen gave St. John's the silver chalice, flagon, and paten (1814)

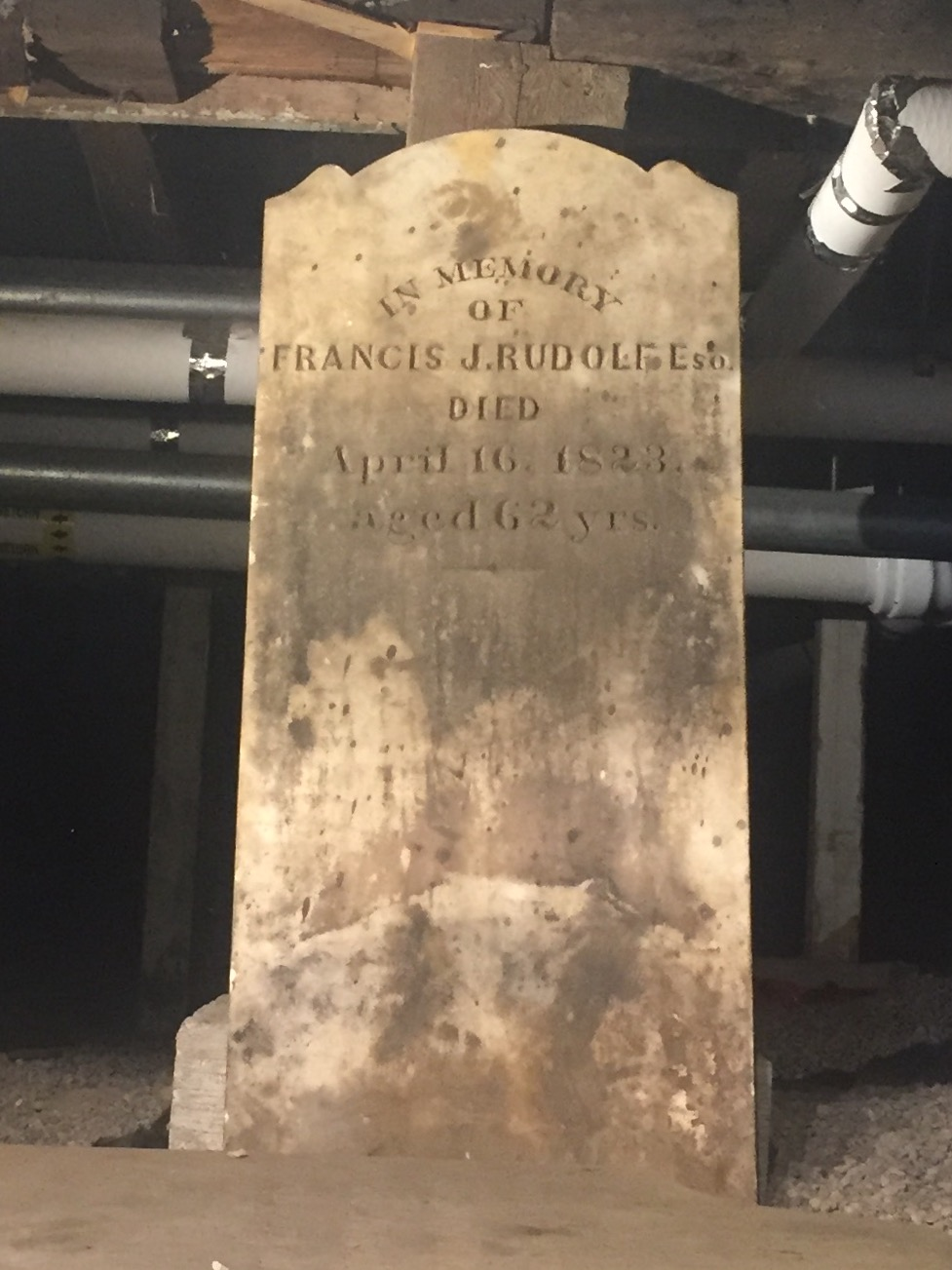
Francis Rudolf, The Crypt

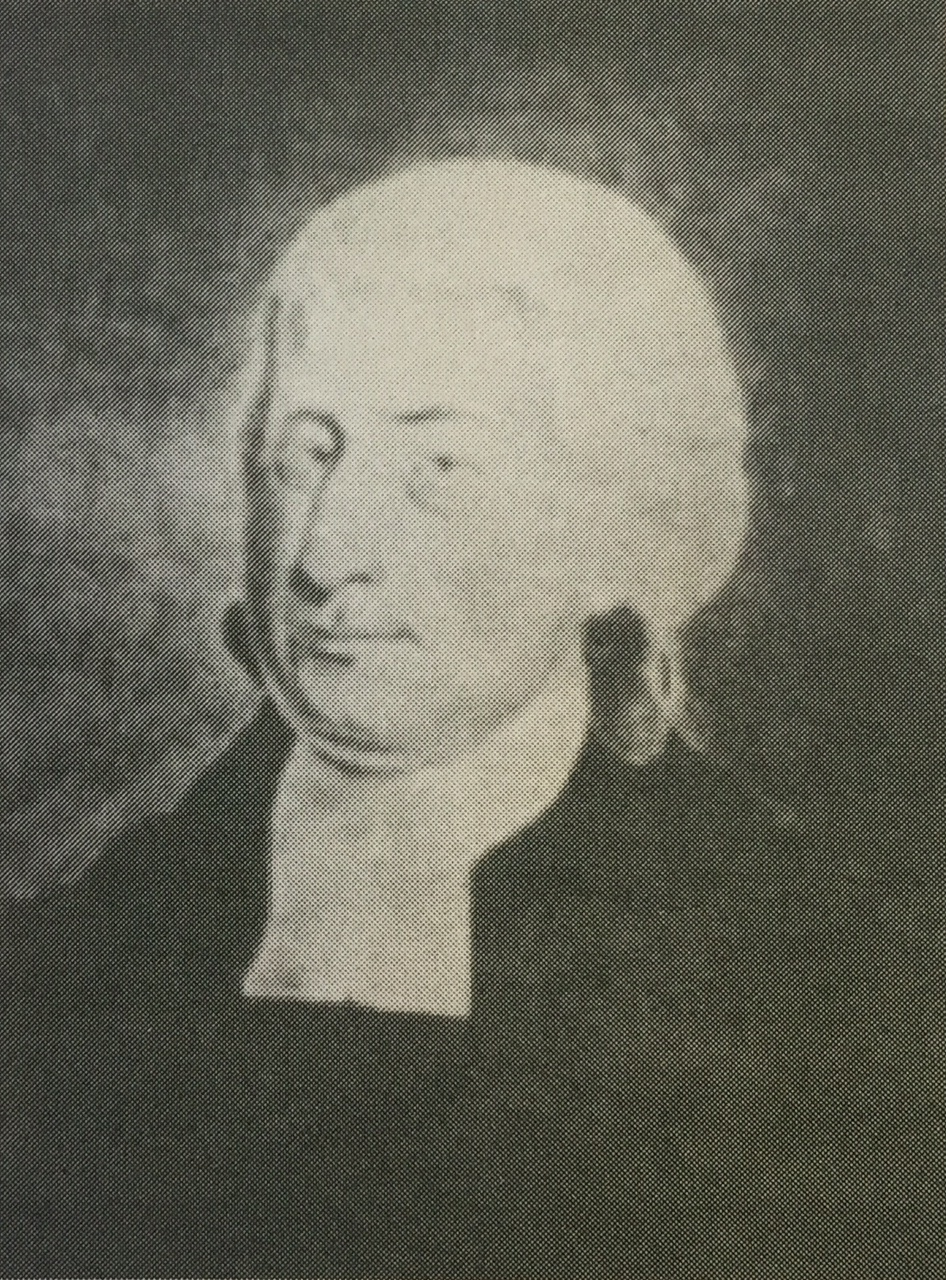
Rev. Thomas Shreve

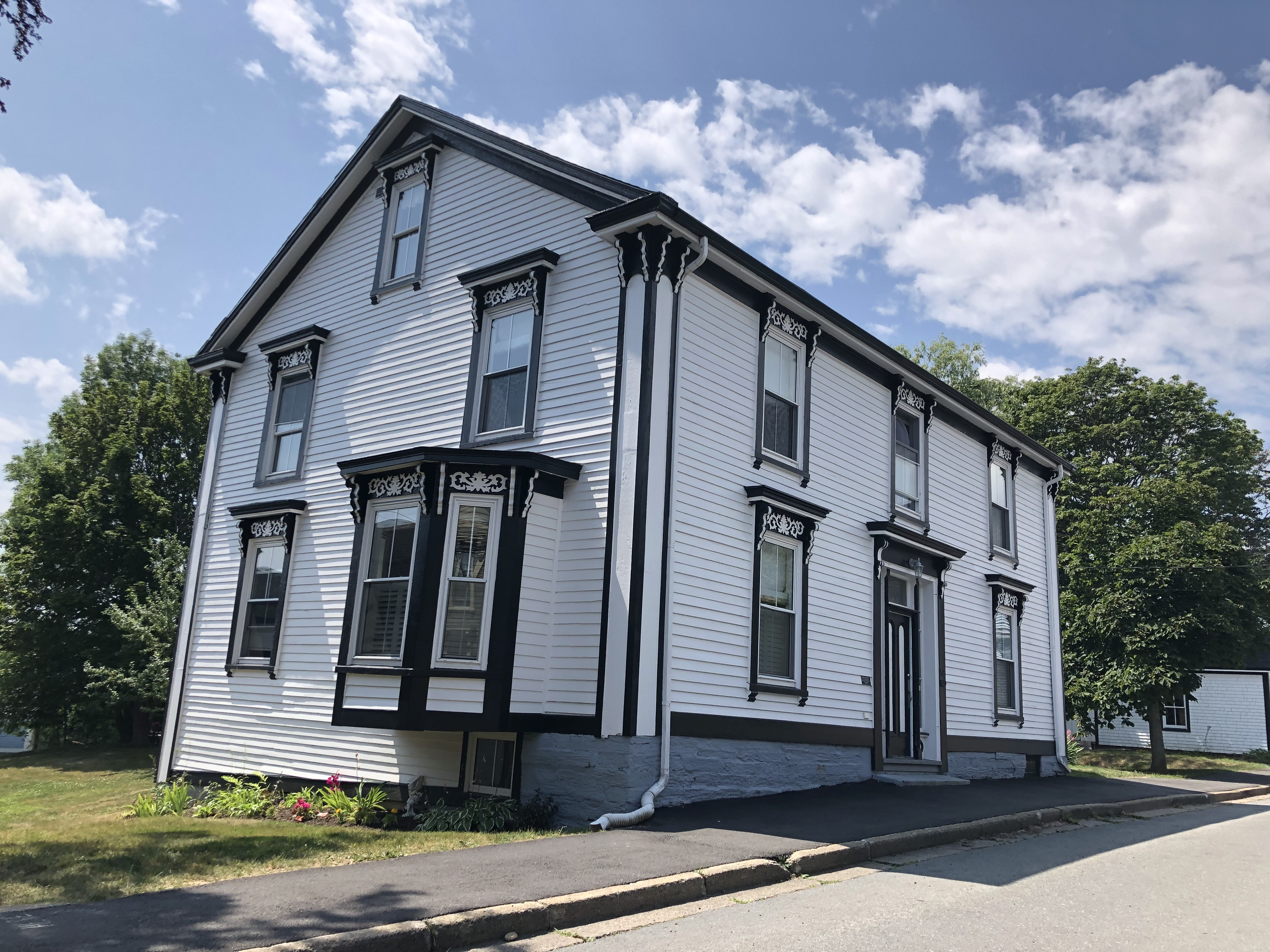
Rectory, St. John's Anglican Church, Lunenburg, Nova Scotia (c 1816)

== See also ==
- List of oldest buildings in Canada
- Zion Evangelical Lutheran Church (Lunenburg)
- St. Paul's Church (Halifax)
- Little Dutch (Deutsch) Church – St. George's Cemetery
- St. Andrew's Presbyterian Church (Lunenburg)
- St. Peter's Anglican Church (West LaHave, Nova Scotia)
