= Dettlieb Christopher Jessen =

Canadian politician

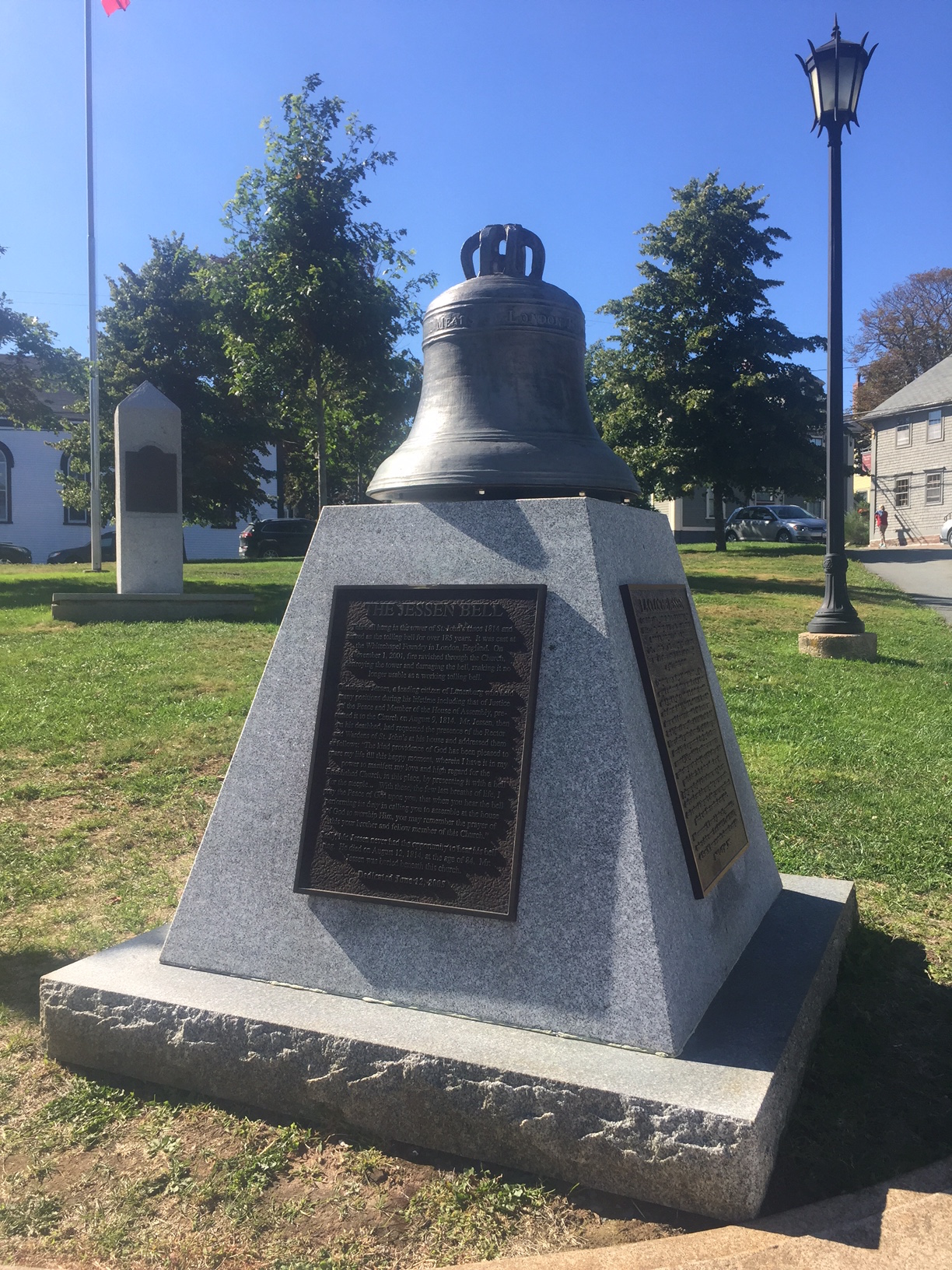
- The Jessen Bell (1814), made by the Whitechapel Bell Foundry, St. John's Anglican Church (Lunenburg), Nova Scotia
- Born: February 25, 1730; Holstein
- Died: August 12, 1814 (aged 84); Lunenburg, Nova Scotia
- Occupation: Cooper

Dettlieb Christopher Jessen (February 25, 1730 – August 12, 1814) was one of the founding fathers of Lunenburg, Nova Scotia, and helped the village through Father Le Loutre's War, the French and Indian War and the American Revolution. He was German born. After his emigration to Canada, he became a militia leader, judge, and politician in Nova Scotia. His first name also appears as "Detleff". He represented Lunenburg County in the Nova Scotia House of Assembly from 1785 to 1793.

Dettlieb Christopher Jessen was born in Holstein and came to Halifax as one of the Foreign Protestants in 1751, settling in Lunenburg two years later. He was a wine cooper. Jessen served as lieutenant in the local militia, reaching the rank of lieutenant colonel.

He was also present for the defence of the town through the Lunenburg Campaign (1758) during the French and Indian War, in which he wrote one of the rare log books of a militia troop defending against Mi'kmaq attacks. On one of the patrols of the Lunenburg peninsula, Jessen discovered two British soldiers that were scalped and a 10-year-old boy that was captured.

During the American Revolution, Jessen was again involved with defending the town in the Raid on Lunenburg (1782). He initially fired at the Privateers from his home (corner of Lincoln and King), which the privateers returned fired, filling his home full of bullets, eventually smashing all the windows and looting the place. Major Jessen escaped and assembled with a militia behind the hill overlooking the town. A militia from La Have under the command of Major Joseph Pernette also advanced toward Lunenburg to join Major Jessen. Captain Stoddard sent a message to Jensen and Pernette that if they advanced on the town, all the homes would be burned. To ensure his threat was not idle, Major Stoddard burned down Col. Creighton's home. His house was spoiled and robbed in the raid. He was also a justice of the peace, a judge in the Inferior Court of Common Pleas, registrar of deeds and a customs collector. Jessen married Francisca Barbara Rudolf in 1755.

Toward the end of his life, Jessen presented the church with a church bell and silver communion service c.1813. Before he could hear the bell himself, he died in Lunenburg at the age of 84. He is buried in the crypt of St. John's Anglican Church.

== Gallery ==
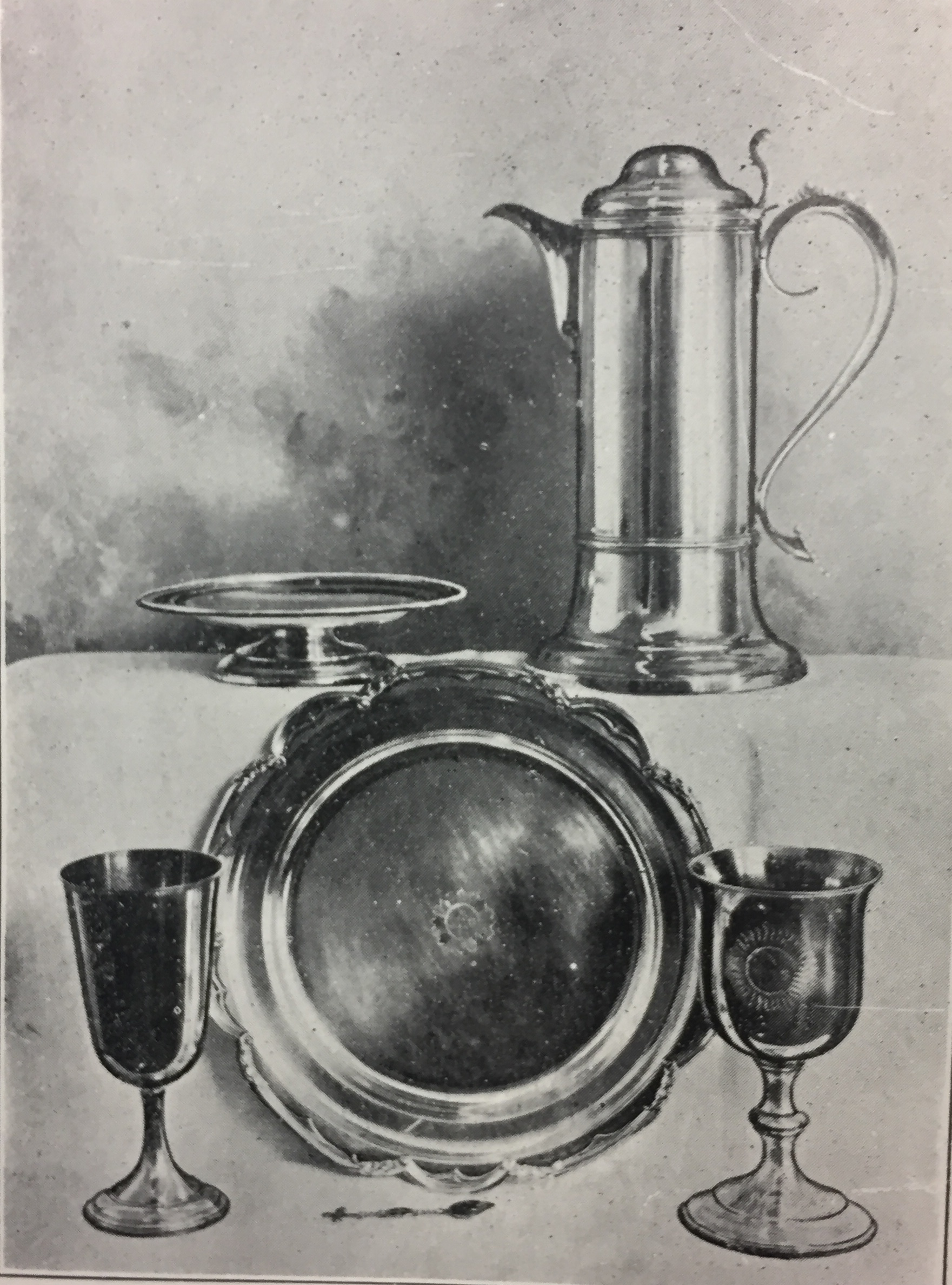
Jessen gave St. John's the silver chalice, flagon, and paten (1814), St. John's Anglican Church, Lunenburg, Nova Scotia, Canada

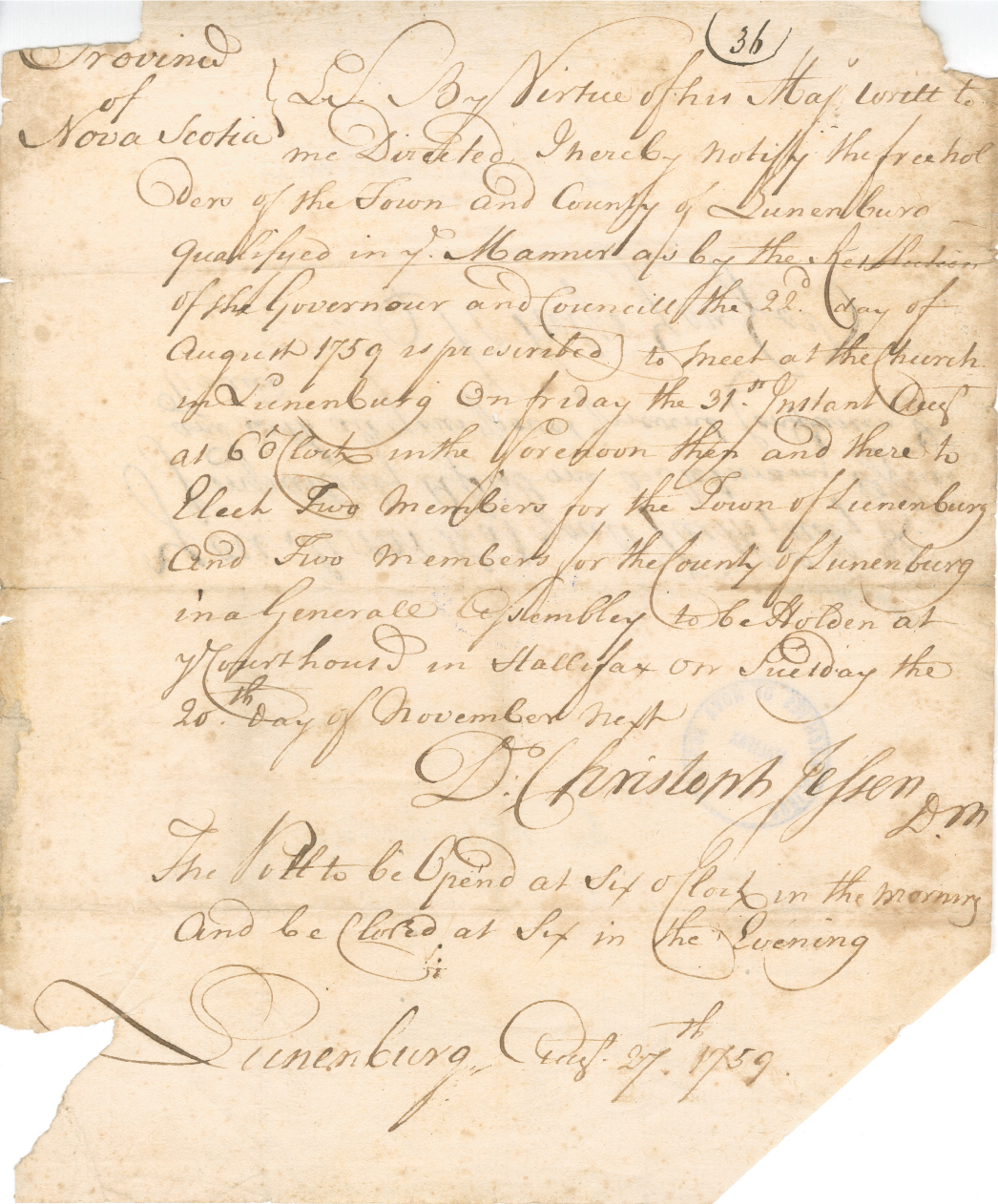
Election writ for the second assembly, 27 August 1759, issued by Dettlieb Christopher Jessen

== See also ==
- Patrick Sutherland
- John Creighton (judge)
- Jean-Baptiste Moreau (clergyman)
- Sebastian Zouberbuhler
