= Second Peninsula, Nova Scotia =

Community in Nova Scotia, Canada

Coordinates: 44°24′19.21″N 64°17′31.17″W

Second Peninsula in Nova Scotia

Second Peninsula is a community in the Canadian province of Nova Scotia, located in the Lunenburg Municipal District in Lunenburg County.

The climate is continental. The average temperature is 6 °C. The warmest month is August, at 19 °C, and the coldest is February, at −10 °C.

Ranger Joseph Gorham owned 300 acres of land at Lunenburg: land still named Gorham Point at the end of present-day Second Peninsula, two islands nearby, a peninsula leading from the community of Mahone Bay as well as the Seven Islands, near Sacrifice Island in Mahone Bay. After participating in the Siege of Louisbourg (1758), Gorham was in the area fighting against the Mi'kmaq militia's Lunenburg Campaign (1758).
