= Jean-Baptiste Moreau (clergyman) =

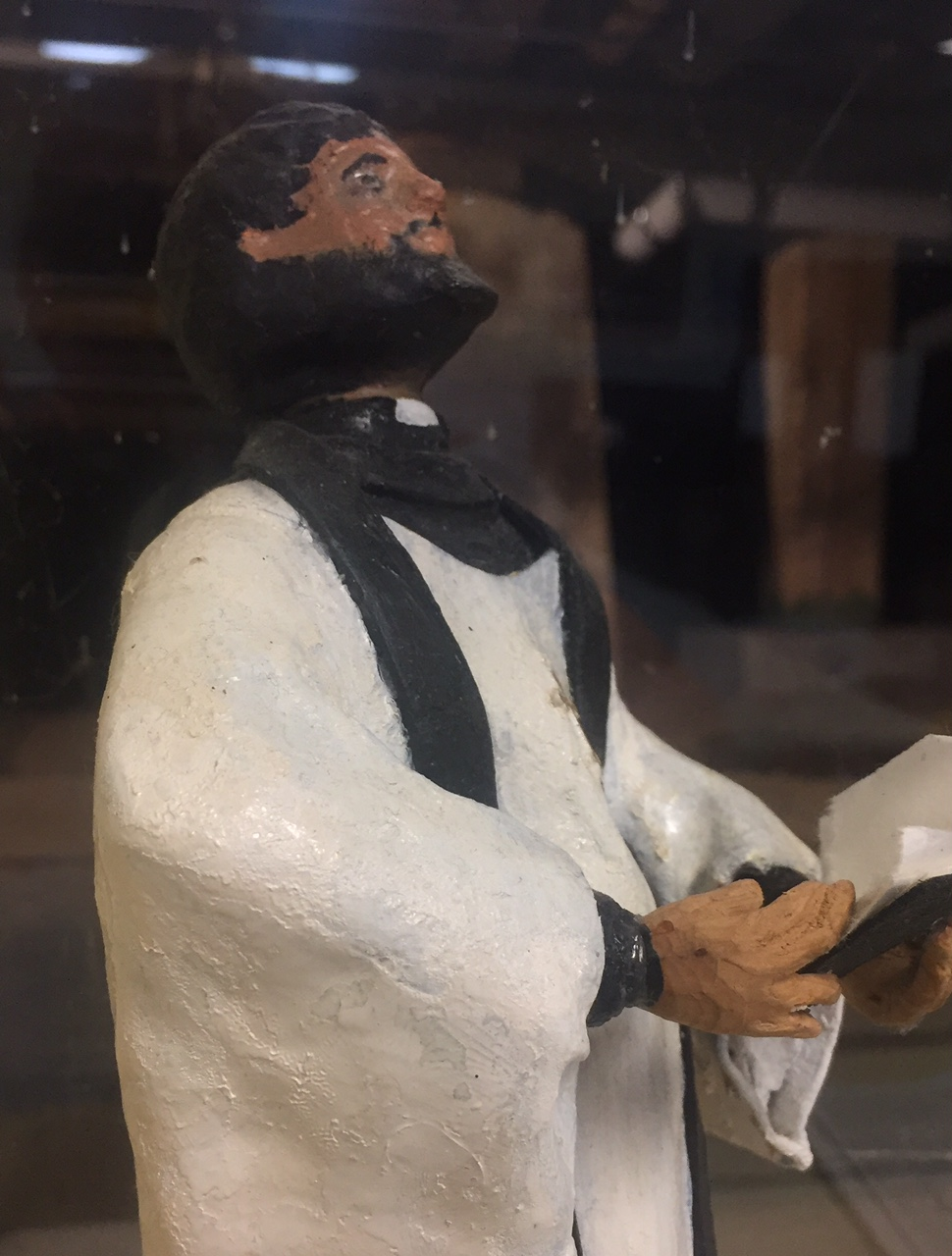
Jean-Baptiste Moreau, lead statue by Arthur W. Schwartz, St. John's Anglican Church, Lunenburg, Nova Scotia (c. 1935)

Jean-Baptiste Moreau (French pronunciation: [ʒɑ̃ batist mɔʁo]) was first priest at St. John's Anglican Church (Lunenburg) (1753-1770) and one of the founding fathers of the community. He was one of two missionaries who first arrived in Halifax with Edward Cornwallis (1749) and served at St. Paul's Church (Halifax). His wife had the first child born in Halifax and was named Cornwallis after the Governor. Then in 1753 he was sent to help establish Lunenburg, Nova Scotia. Rev Moreau served the community throughout the French and Indian War. He reported to Society for Propagation of the Gospel (SPG) in London, "…the number massacred by Indians in Lunenburg District during the War was 32." He learned the Mi'kmaw language and is reported to have baptised a number of Mi'kmaq children. He is buried in the crypt of St. John's Anglican Church

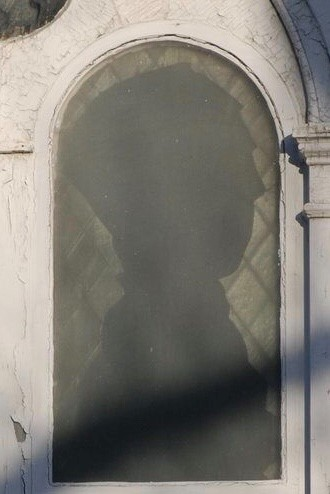
Silhouette in the likeness of Jean-Baptiste Moreau, St. Paul's Church (Halifax), Nova Scotia. Created by the Halifax Explosion

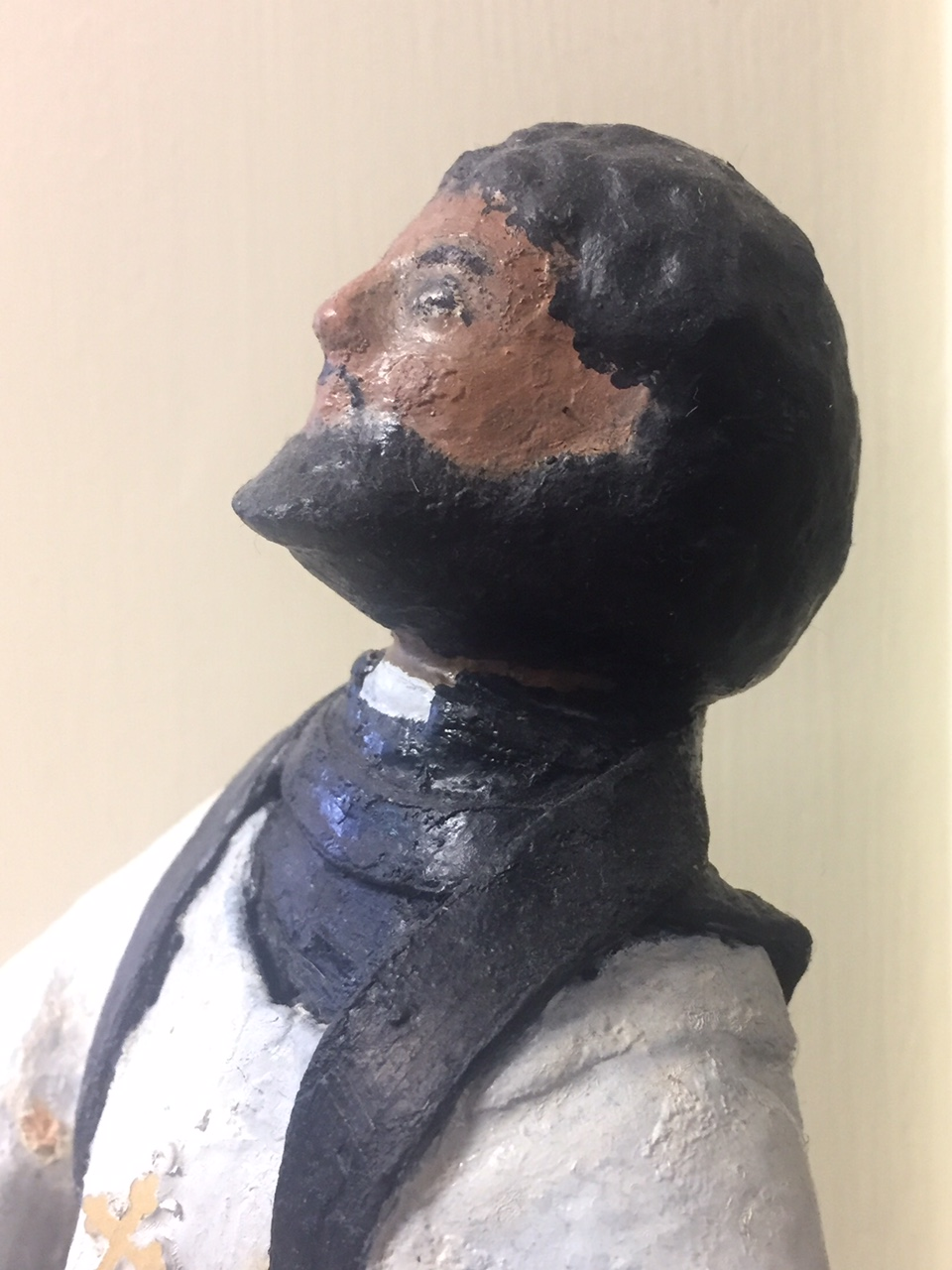
Jean-Baptiste Moreau, lead statue by Arthur W. Schwartz, St. John's Anglican Church, Lunenburg, Nova Scotia (c. 1935)

== See also ==
- Dettlieb Christopher Jessen
- John Creighton (judge)
- Patrick Sutherland
- Sebastian Zouberbuhler
