= Patrick Sutherland =

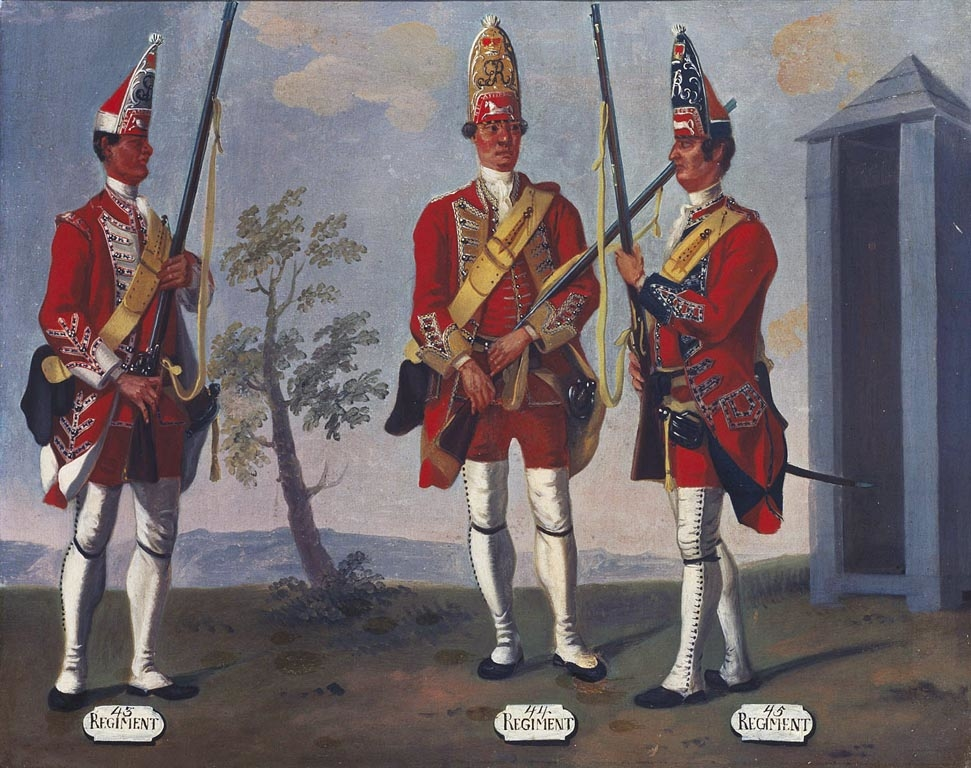
Sutherland's Regiment: 45th Regiment of Foot (right) By David Morier, 1751

Major Patrick Sutherland served as commander at Fort Edward and then became one of the founding fathers of Lunenburg, Nova Scotia. He remained in command at Lunenburg until his death 15 years after establishing the town (c. 1768). He helped the village survive Father Le Loutre's War and the French and Indian War. During this time he quelled the Lunenburg Rebellion and built blockhouses to protect the village after the Raid on Lunenburg (1756). He participated in the Siege of Louisbourg (1758) and in protecting the village Lunenburg from the subsequent Lunenburg Campaign (1758). Sutherland became a justice of the peace (1759), custos rotulorum (1760) and a justice of the Inferior Court of Common Pleas for Lunenburg County (1760).

Sutherland was promoted to major in the 77th Regiment of Foot, and participated in the Battle of St. John's (1762).

He died in 1766.

== See also ==
- Dettlieb Christopher Jessen
- John Creighton (judge)
- Jean-Baptiste Moreau (clergyman)
- Sebastian Zouberbuhler
