= Sebastian Zouberbuhler =

Nova Scotia politician (c. 1710–1773)

- Born: c. 1710; Switzerland
- Died: January 31, 1773; Lunenburg, Nova Scotia, British America
- Military career
- Allegiance: Great Britain
- Rank: Captain
- Unit: 2nd Massachusetts Regiment
- Conflict: War of the Austrian Succession; Siege of Louisbourg

Sebastian Zouberbuhler (c. 1710 – January 31, 1773) was a merchant, justice of the peace, and politician in Nova Scotia. He came to North America to promote colonial ventures, and later became a merchant in Halifax and Lunenburg.

Born in Switzerland, Zouberbuhler came to the Province of South Carolina to survey land for a new settlement. He attempted to attract hundreds of Swiss to this colony, but the Swiss government restricted his efforts. Returning to North America as an agent for the merchant Samuel Waldo, the Massachusetts General Court determined that the two men neglected the German Protestants he helped to settle in present-day Maine.

During Britain's occupation of Louisbourg, he traded goods and invested in the settlement. When Louisbourg returned to French control, he moved to Halifax to continue his business. In Lunenburg, Zouberbuhler was appointed as a justice of the peace and judge of quorum. The community reacted negatively due to his Halifax background, and his unpopularity deepened with his decision to license taverns. The town suspected him of possessing a letter that confirmed that the town did not receive an allotment of supplies, but a subsequent investigation by the town's battalion commander concluded that he never possessed such a letter. He represented the town in the Nova Scotia House of Assembly and was later appointed to the Nova Scotia Council. Later in life he acquired large tracts of land and promoted the Church of England.

== Early life ==
Sebastian Zouberbuhler was born in Switzerland in 1709 or 1710, the son of a reverend named Bartholomew; Zouberbuhler was identified as being from the Swiss canton of Appenzell. In November 1734, Zouberbuhler went to Charles Town, South Carolina, to survey land for a new settlement, selecting a site along the New Windsor tract. The South Carolina government encouraged land surveillers like Zouberbuhler in their work as they wanted more European settlers in the colony. While in South Carolina, Zouberbuhler borrowed a large sum from another Swiss named Samuel Augspurger. Zouberbuhler pledged to the South Carolina colony that he would bring 100 families to Fort Moore within eighteen months, and 200 families afterwards. Zouberbuhler recruited 50 families and left for North America under his father's direction in August 1736. He was granted a one-year extension to find more families and returned to Switzerland to continue his efforts; the Swiss government hindered the emigration agents' work, and Zouberbuhler could not fulfil his promise.

Zouberbuhler returned to North America and worked as an agent for Samuel Waldo, who speculated in land throughout South Carolina and Massachusetts. In 1743, Zouberbuhler and Waldo were found at fault by a committee of the Massachusetts General Court for neglecting German Protestants that were recruited to settle in present-day Maine.

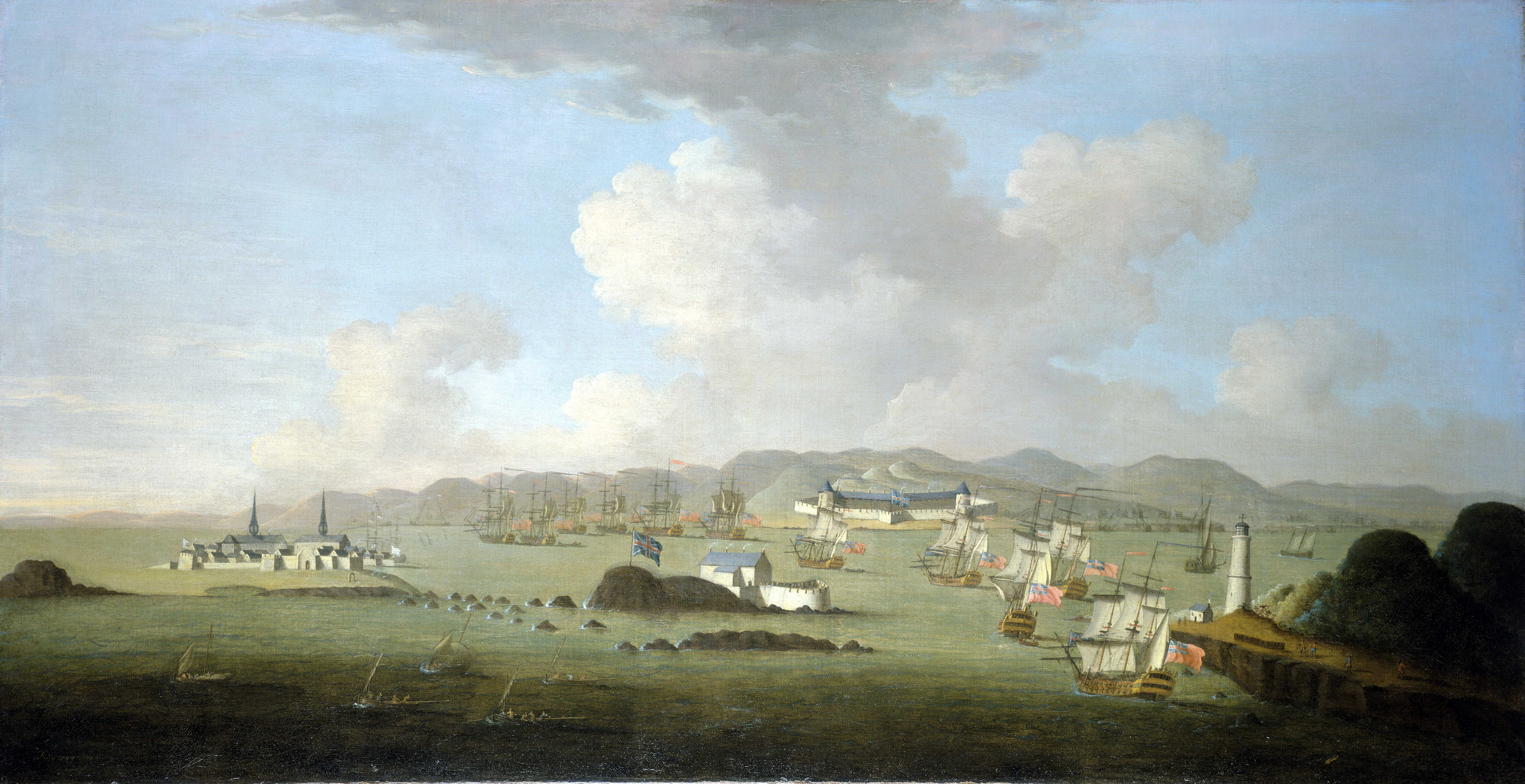
During the 1745 siege of Louisbourg, Zouberbuhler was captain of the British 2nd Massachusetts Regiment

In the 1740s, the British and the French were opponents during King George's War. The British sieged Louisbourg, the capital of Île-Royale (present-day Cape Breton Island), in 1745. Zouberbuhler was part of the British forces during the siege as a captain in the 2nd Massachusetts Regiment. During the British occupation, he invested his and Waldo's money to trade lumber, cattle, and coal in Louisbourg. After the settlement was returned to the French, he moved to Halifax in 1749 or 1750. He still traded in Louisbourg by representing the businesses of merchant Joshua Mauger, selling ships to French residents, and importing coal into Halifax. He frequently collaborated with government officials, increasing his power and influence in the colony.

In 1752, Zouberbuhler supported a clerk's complaint to the Inferior Court and Quarter Sessions and the governor of Nova Scotia. The complaint's accusations included poor treatment from the court's justices and lack of payment for accrued expenses for acting as the clerk. Zouberbuhler and other merchants signed a memorandum supporting the clerk and questioning the conduct of the justices in numerous cases.

== Lunenburg ==
In 1753, Zouberbuhler was appointed as a justice of the peace and judge of quorum for Lunenburg; he was also given the rank of captain for the town's militia. The residents were suspicious of a Halifax merchant in these justice roles as they felt he would ignore their concerns. His popularity decreased further when he recommended licencing one or two taverns to regulate the rum trade and stop smuggling.

In December 1753, a rumour spread that Jean Pettrequin, a carpenter in Lunenburg, received a letter that stated that the British government allotted supplies for the town but they had not arrived. Townsfolk seized Pettrequin to search for the letter and held him in a blockhouse. Patrick Sutherland, lieutenant-colonel in command for Lunenburg, brought Zouberbuhler and other government officials to investigate the situation, in which he freed Pettrequin. The mob seized Pettrequin again, hoping to get more information about the whereabouts of the supposed letter. Various rumours spread about the location of the letter, one of which was that Pettrequin sold it to Zouberbuhler for a lump sum of money or the guarantee of a pension for the duration of Zouberbuhler's life. While interrogated by the mob, Pettrequin stated that Zouberbuhler had the letter.

Later that night, a sergeant in the town's militia told Sutherland about Pettrequin's statement. Sutherland arranged for Zouberbuhler to be protected in the fort and Zouberbuhler hid from the mob in a blockhouse, protected by soldiers assigned by Sutherland. A delegation from the mob met with Sutherland, demanding either the letter or the release of Zouberbuhler into their custody. Zouberbuhler told the delegation that he had never seen the letter and did not have it, but the mob did not believe him. After several hours of negotiation, Sutherland assured the delegation that Zouberbuhler would remain in the town until the acting governor of Nova Scotia, Charles Lawrence, could investigate the matter. This did not quell the mob, but they dispersed when a battalion of soldiers restored order. The battalion's commander investigated the matter and concluded that Zouberbuhler never possessed the supposed letter.

== Political and later life ==
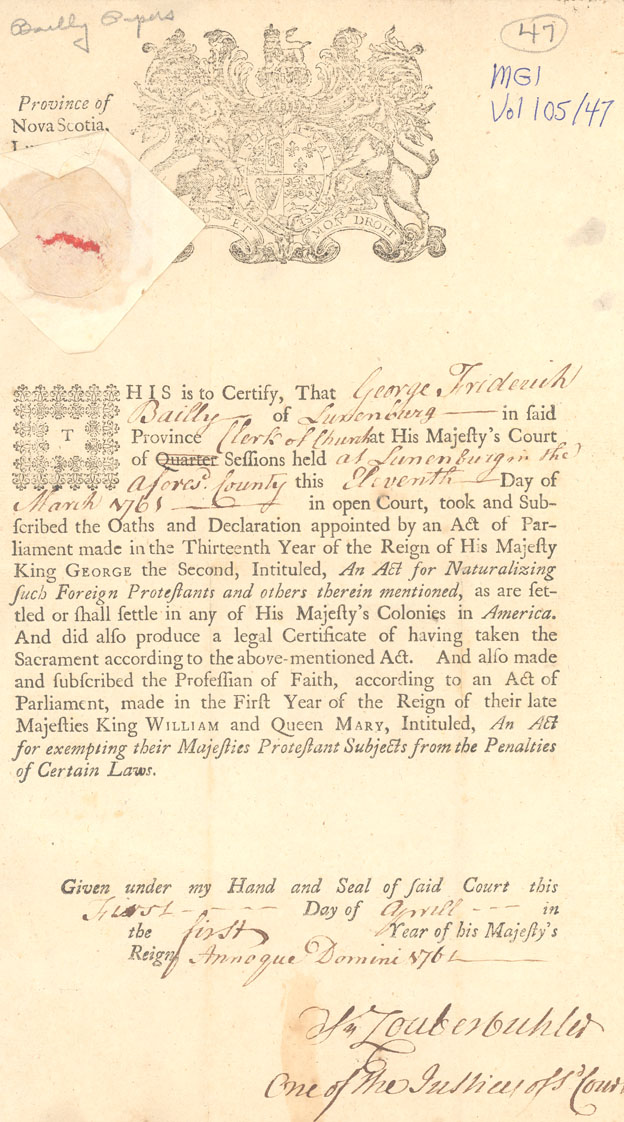
A naturalisation oath that Zouberbuhler authorised in his capacity as a justice of the court

In July 1758, Lawrence appointed Zouberbuhler to preside over a special court that would naturalise willing residents of Lunenburg with residence of at least seven years. Later that month, Zouberbuhler ran to be a representative for Lunenburg for the Nova Scotia House of Assembly. Almost all of the townsmen of English descent and some naturalised citizens voted for him, but he was unsuccessful. The following year, he was successfully elected as one of the representatives for the Lunenburg Township to the Nova Scotia House of Assembly and re-elected in 1761.

In August 1762, Zouberbuhler was one of six men tasked by Nova Scotia acting governor Jonathan Belcher to assign tracts of land that were added to the Lunenburg township. In 1763, Mauger tried to prevent Belcher's permanent appointment as governor of the colony. When this failed, he secured the appointment of his friends, including Zouberbuhler, to the Nova Scotia Council. Zouberbuhler attended council meetings sporadically in the first two years of his appointment and less frequently in the subsequent eight years. He was one of six appointments to the Council between 1760 and 1830 who did not reside in Halifax.

During this time, Zouberbuhler continued his business in the Lunenburg timber trade. He also purchased land in Halifax and Lunenburg County, including 125,000 acres with Alexander McNutt, a land agent, and four others between Annapolis Basin and St. Marys Bay. He tried using his position as a councillor to obtain an additional 20,000 acres, but this was blocked by the Board of Trade and he only bought 5,000 acres. He gave a large donation to build a school in Northwest, Nova Scotia, which began construction in 1771. Shortly before his death, he transferred his two parcels of land to James Boutineau Francklin.

== Personal life and death ==
Zouberbuhler supported initiatives to promote the Church of England in Lunenburg, including advocating for a Church of England minister who could speak German and opposing the activities of Calvinist and Lutheran preachers. He died in Lunenburg on January 31, 1773; a contributing cause to his death might have been gout. Most of his property and assets was given to his daughter, Catherine Silver. In a codicil to his will, Zouberbuhler stated that a portion of his assets would be given to Samuel Augsperger to repay his loan from the 1730s. The codicil was set aside after it was declared that the statement was made when Zouberbuhler could no longer make legal decisions.

== Works cited ==
=== Books ===
- Beck, James Murray (1957). The Government of Nova Scotia. Toronto: University of Toronto Press. OCLC 958564849 – via Project Muse.
- Bell, Winthrop Pickard (1961). The "foreign Protestants" and the settlement of Nova Scotia: the history of a piece of arrested British colonial policy in the eighteenth century. Toronto: University of Toronto Press.
- Cahill, Barry (1996). "The 'Hoffman Rebellion' (1753) and Hoffman's Trial (1754): Constructive High Treason and Seditious Conspiracy in Nova Scotia under the Stratocracy". In Wright, Barry; Greenwood, Frank Murray (eds.). Canadian State Trials, Volume I: Law, Politics, and Security Measures, 1608–1837. Toronto: University of Toronto Press. ISBN 9781487596187.
- Elliott, Shirley B. (1984). The Legislative Assembly of Nova Scotia, 1758–1983: a biographical directory (PDF). Halifax: Province of Nova Scotia. ISBN 088871050X.
- Jones Helsley, Alexia (2019). Lost Aiken County. Arcadia Publishing. ISBN 9781439666265.
- Muir, James (2016a). Law, Debt, and Merchant Power: The Civil Courts of Eighteenth-Century Halifax. University of Toronto Press. ISBN 9781487512309. OCLC 959713746.

=== Journals ===
- Gwyn, Julian (2004). ""A slave to business all my life." Joshua Mauger, c. 1712–1788: The Man and the Myth". Journal of the Royal Nova Scotia Historical Society. 7: 38–62. ISSN 1486-5920. ProQuest 1017714190.
- Muir, James (2016b). "The Fight for Bourgeois Law in Halifax, Nova Scotia, 1749–1753". Histoire Sociale/Social History. 49 (98): 1–25. doi:10.1353/his.2016.0024. ISSN 1918-6576 – via Project Muse.
- Penner, B.R. (1997). "Old World Traditions, New World Landscapes: Ethnicity and Archaeology of Swiss-Appenzellers in the Colonial South Carolina Backcountry". International Journal of Historical Archaeology. 1 (4): 257–321. doi:10.1023/A:1022670103424. ISSN 1573-7748 – via Springer Link.
