= Northwest, Nova Scotia =

Community in Nova Scotia, Canada

Coordinates: 44°24′38.63″N 64°21′49.49″W

Northwest in Nova Scotia

Northwest is a community in the Canadian province of Nova Scotia, located in the Lunenburg Municipal District in Lunenburg County.
