= Lunenburg, Nova Scotia =

Town in Nova Scotia, Canada

Lunenburg
- Town
- Town of Lunenburg
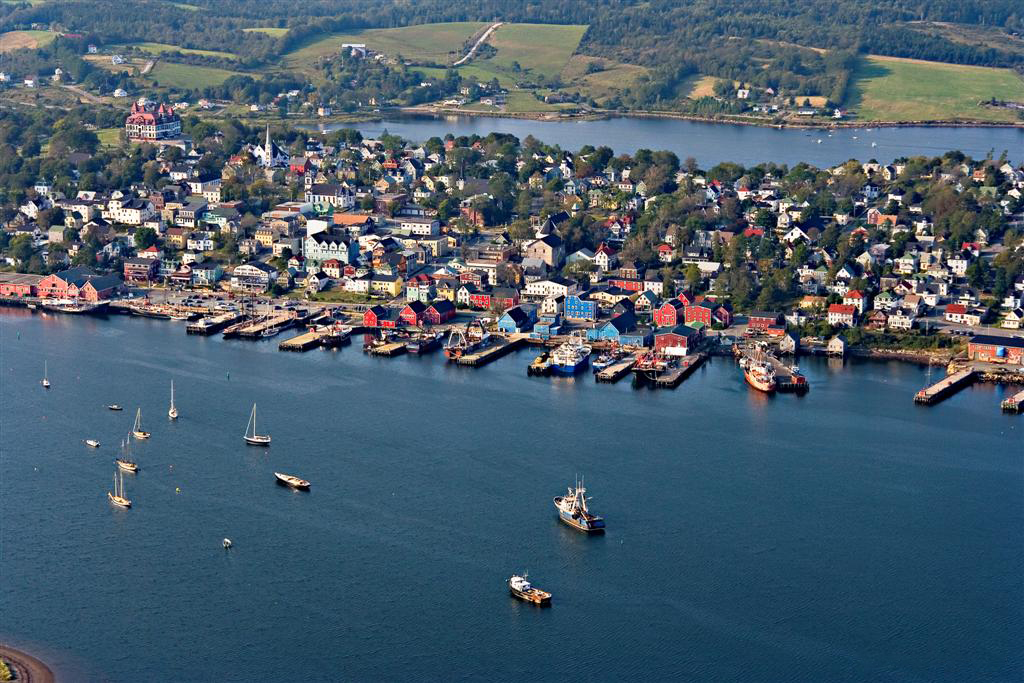
- Aerial photo of Lunenburg

- Seal

- Location of Lunenburg, Nova Scotia
- Coordinates: 44°22′40″N 64°18′34″W
- Country: Canada
- Province: Nova Scotia
- County: Lunenburg County
- Founded: 1753
- Natal Day: June 7, 1753
- Incorporated: October 31, 1888
- Named for: Duke of Brunswick-Lüneburg
- Electoral Districts Federal: South Shore—St. Margarets
- Provincial: Lunenburg

Government
  - Body: Lunenburg Town Council
  - Mayor: Jamie Myra
  - MLA: Susan Corkum-Greek (PC)
  - MP: Jessica Fancy-Landry (LPC)

Area (2021)
  - Land: 4.04 km^{2} (1.56 sq mi)

Population (2021)
  - Total: 2,396
  - Density: 593/km^{2} (1,540/sq mi)
- Time zone: UTC−4 (AST)
  - Summer (DST): UTC−3 (ADT)
- Postal code: B0J
- Area code(s): 902 & 782
- Highways: Trunk 3 Route 332; Route 324
- Website: Town of Lunenburg

UNESCO World Heritage Site
- Official name: Old Town Lunenburg
- Type: Cultural
- Criteria: iv, v
- Designated: 1995 (19th session)
- Reference no.: 741
- Region: Europe and North America

National Historic Site of Canada
- Official name: Old Town Lunenburg Historic District National Historic Site of Canada
- Designated: 1991

Nova Scotia Heritage Property Act
- Type: Heritage Conservation District
- Designated: 2000

Lunenburg (/ˈluːnənbɜːrɡ/) is a port town on the South Shore of Nova Scotia, Canada. Founded in 1753, the town was one of the first British attempts to settle Protestants in Nova Scotia.

Historically, Lunenburg's economy relied on the offshore fishery, and today it hosts Canada's largest secondary fish-processing plant. The town experienced prosperity in the late 1800s, and many of its architectural gems date back to that era.

In 1995, UNESCO designated it a World Heritage Site. UNESCO considers the site the best example of planned British colonial settlement in North America, as it retains its original layout and appearance of the 1800s, including local wooden vernacular architecture. UNESCO considers the town in need of protection because the future of its traditional economic underpinnings, the Atlantic fishery, is now very uncertain.

The historic core of the town is also a National Historic Site of Canada.

== Toponymy ==
Lunenburg was named in 1753 after the Duke of Braunschweig-Lüneburg who had become King George II of Great Britain. The Acadian inhabitants of the site had called it Mirliguèche, a French spelling of the Mi'kmaq name Makikewe'j of uncertain meaning. An earlier Mi'kmaq name was āseedĭk, meaning clam-land.

== History ==
The Mi'kmaq have lived in a territory from the present site of Lunenburg to Mahone Bay. At one point, as many as 300 Mi'kmaq people inhabited the site in the warm summer months. Acadians settled in the area around the 1620s. The Acadians and Mi’kmaq co-existed peacefully and some intermarried, creating networks of trade and kinship. In 1688, 10 Acadians and 11 Mi’kmaq were resident with dwellings and a small area of cultivated land. By 1745, there were eight families.

When Edward Cornwallis, newly appointed Governor of Nova Scotia, visited in 1749, he reported several Mi’kmaq and Acadian families living together at Mirliguèche in comfortable houses and said they "appeared to be doing well."

Britain and France carried their military conflicts in Europe in the 1700s to the New World. Under the 1713 Treaty of Utrecht, France ceded the part of Acadia today known as peninsular Nova Scotia to Britain. To guard against Mi'kmaq, Acadian and French colonial attacks, the British erected Fort George in 1749 at Citadel Hill Halifax and founded the town of Halifax.

The British sought to settle the lands with loyal subjects, and recruited more than 1,400 foreign protestants, mostly artisans and farmers, from Europe in July 1753 to populate the site. The British had failed to provide promised land in Halifax to many of these settlers and they had become frustrated, causing problems for the British. The resettlement thus served the additional purpose of removing many of the Foreign Protestants from Halifax. Led by Charles Lawrence, the settlers were accompanied by about 160 soldiers. They assembled prefabricated blockhouses and constructed a palisade along the neck of land where the village was laid out. The settlers spent the summer building shelters for the winter and, not having been able to conduct any fishing or farming, had to be provisioned from Halifax. When the settlers became dissatisfied with the distribution of provisions and due to general distrust and frustration from mistreatment by the British, they rose in armed rebellion in The Lunenburg Rebellion and briefly declared a republic, only to be put down by troops led by Colonel Robert Monckton. Others defected to the Acadian side. In 1754, the town had a sawmill and a store.

In 1755, after the expulsion of the Acadians, the British needed to repopulate vacated lands. It offered generous land grants to colonists from New England, which was experiencing a severe shortage in land. Today these immigrants are referred to as the New England Planters. Lunenburg was raided in 1756 by a mixed group of Mi'kmaq and Maliseet raiders, devastating the town. The attacks continued on the British with the Lunenburg Campaign of 1758. Hostilities with Mi'kmaq ended around 1760.

During the American Revolution, privateers from the rebelling colonies raided Lunenburg, including the 1782 raid, devastating the town once again. The town was fortified at the beginning of the War of 1812. The British officials authorised the privateer Lunenburg, operated by Lunenburg residents, to raid American shipping.

Over the following years, port activities transitioned from coastal trade and local mixed fisheries, to offshore fisheries. During the Prohibition in the United States between 1920 and 1933, Lunenburg was a base for rum-running to the US.

The Lunenburg Cure was the term for a style of dried and salted cod that the city exported to markets in the Caribbean. Today a large hammered copper cod weather vane is mounted on the spire of St. Andrew's Presbyterian Church.

The Smith & Rhuland shipyard built many boats, including Bluenose (1921), Flora Alberta (1941), Sherman Zwicker (1942), Bluenose II (1963), Bounty (1961), and the replica HMS Surprise (1970). In 1967 the yard was taken over by Scotia Trawler Equipment Limited. After the end of World War II, shipbuilders switched from producing schooners to trawlers, aided by migrant labour from Newfoundland. In 2025, a tree from Lunenburg was cut down and shipped to the United States to serve as the Boston Christmas Tree.

== Geography ==
=== Physical geography ===
Lunenburg is in a natural harbour at the western side of Mahone Bay, about 100 km (62 mi) southwest of Downtown Halifax.

The area is built largely on Cambrian to Ordovician sedimentary deposits. The last glacial period transformed the landscape. Glaciers abraded and plucked at the bedrock during their advances across the country, creating various deposits that vary in thickness, including drumlins, which are a key feature of Lunenburg County.

The coastline in the area is heavily indented, and the town is on an isthmus on the Fairhaven Peninsula, with harbours on both the front and back sides.

=== Climate ===
The climate of Lunenburg is moderate, owing to its coastal location which helps to limit extremes in temperatures. This means it is slightly milder in winter and slightly cooler in summer than most areas at similar latitudes. Lunenburg enjoys warm, breezy summers with temperatures in the low to mid 20s °C (70s °F). It is seldom hot and humid. Winters are cold and frequently wet. Heavy winter snowfall can occur, but Lunenburg's snowpack is usually short lived due to frequent winter rains and regular freeze-thaw cycles. Thick fog and damp conditions can occur at any time of year, but especially in spring. Seasonal lag due to cooler ocean temperatures means that spring conditions arrive in Lunenburg late in the season, often not until mid May. On the whole, Lunenburg precipitation is high from November to May, with July, August and September enjoying the warmest and driest conditions. Fall is typically bright, clear and cool. Jan: 1° Feb: 2° Mar: 5° Apr: 11° May: 15° Jun: 21° Jul: 23° Aug: 24° Sep: 21° Oct: 15° Nov: 9° Dec: 4°

=== Old Town ===
The original planned town was built on a steep south-facing hillside. It was laid out with compact lots in a rectangular grid pattern of narrow streets without regard to the topography. It is now known as the Old Town, and is the part of town which is protected by UNESCO. It is also the site of the old harbour. About 40 buildings in this area are on the Canadian Register of Historic Places including:

- Knaut-Rhuland House, 1793: Now a museum run by the Lunenburg Heritage Society.
- Zion Evangelical Lutheran Church, 1890: large wooden church.
- St. John's Anglican Church, 1763: large wooden Carpenter Gothic church.

The Lunenburg Opera House is also in this area, though built in 1909, and not on the registry.

In 2005, the province of Nova Scotia bought 17 waterfront buildings from Clearwater Foods, the owner of the High Liner Foods brand, to ensure their preservation. Ownership was transferred to the Lunenburg Waterfront Association. Shipbuilding infrastructure worth $1.5 million was added to the Lunenburg waterfront as part of the Bluenose II restoration project, which started in 2010.

The site of the Smith & Rhuland shipyard is now a recreational marina.

The Fisheries Museum of the Atlantic, part of the Nova Scotia Museum, includes a small fleet of vessels, including Bluenose II.

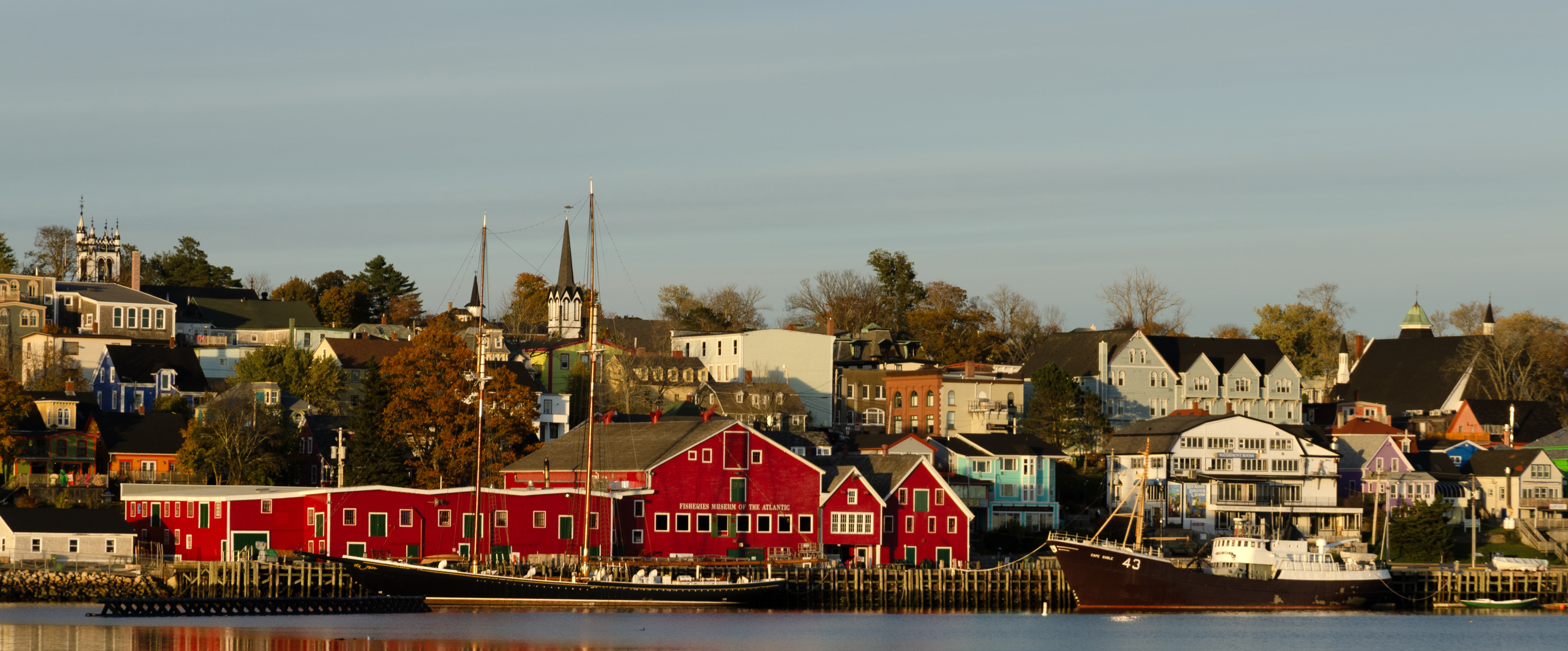

Parts of the waterfront are still used by business. The shipyard ABCO Industries was founded in 1947 on the site of the World War II Norwegian military training facility Camp Norway, and now builds welded aluminum vessels. Lunenburg Shipyard is owned and operated by Lunenburg Industrial Foundry & Engineering. It offers a dry dock, manufacturing and machining, a carpentry shop, and a foundry capable of pouring 272 kg castings. There are wharves for commercial inshore fishing.

=== New Town ===
In the 1800s, Lunenburg prospered through shipping, trade, fishing, farming, shipbuilding, and outgrew its original boundaries. The town was extended into the east and west of the Old Town into what is now known as the New Town. This area includes about a dozen buildings on the Canadian Register of Historic Places.

== Governance ==
Government in Nova Scotia has only two tiers: provincial and municipal. The province is divided into 50 municipalities, of which Lunenburg is one. The town is also within Lunenburg County, which was created for court sessional purposes in the 1860s and today has no government of its own, but the borders of which are coincident with certain provincial and federal electoral districts such as the Lunenburg Provincial Electoral District, and census districts. The county also covers the same terrain as the Municipality of the District of Lunenburg which surrounds, but does not include, Bridgewater, Lunenburg, and Mahone Bay, as they are incorporated separately and not part of the district municipality.

== Economy ==
Colourful storefronts and signs lure tourists for visits

According to the 2016 census, the most common National Occupational Classification was sales and services, with 24 per cent of jobs. By the North American Industry Classification System, about half of all jobs were in health care and social assistance, accommodation and food services, manufacturing, and retail. High Liner Foods runs Canada's largest secondary fish-processing plant in the town.

The town's architecture and picturesque location make it attractive to the film industry. The dramatic and climactic wedding scenes of the Canadian movie Cloudburst was filmed in Lunenburg. Other films set in New England and filmed partly in Lunenburg include The Covenant and Dolores Claiborne. The 2010 Japanese movie Hanamizuki was partly set and filmed in Lunenburg. Further, the supernatural drama television show Haven was partly filmed there throughout its 5-season run, though the story is set in the U.S. State of Maine. The 2012 film The Disappeared, the fourth season of the 2017 television series The Sinner, the 2020 television series Locke & Key, and Brooke Shields' 2026 Acorn TV mystery series You're Killing Me were filmed in Lunenburg.

== Demographics ==
Historical population
Year	Pop.	±%
1901	2,916	—
1911	2,681	−8.1%
1921	2,792	+4.1%
1931	2,727	−2.3%
1941	2,856	+4.7%
1951	2,816	−1.4%
1956	2,859	+1.5%
1961	3,056	+6.9%
1966	3,154	+3.2%
1971	3,215	+1.9%
1976	3,024	−5.9%
1981	2,885	−4.6%
1986	2,972	+3.0%
1991	2,781	−6.4%
1996	2,599	−6.5%
2001	2,568	−1.2%
2006	2,317	−9.8%
2011	2,313	−0.2%
2016	2,263	−2.2%
2021	2,396	+5.9%

In the 2021 Census of Population conducted by Statistics Canada, Lunenburg had a population of 2,396 living in 1,089 of its 1,242 total private dwellings, a change of 5.9% from its 2016 population of 2,263. With a land area of 4.04 km^{2} (1.56 sq mi), it had a population density of 593.1/km^{2} (1,536.0/sq mi) in 2021.

In 2016, the majority of the population is English-speaking Canadian Protestants. At 58, the median age is higher than the provincial median of 46. Household incomes are similar to provincial averages.

== Notable people ==
- Earl Bailly (1903–1977), mouth-painter and printmaker
- Michael Baker (1957–2009), politician
- John Creighton (1721–1807), founding father of Lunenburg, judge and politician
- Dettlieb Christopher Jessen (1730–1814), founding father of Lunenburg and first member of the house of assembly for the town
- Charles Edwin Kaulbach (1834–1907), merchant, ship owner and politician
- Jean-Baptiste Moreau (1753–1770), first missionary at the site
- Beamish Murdoch (1800–1876), lawyer, historian, and politician
- Bill Plaskett (born 1945), musician and founder of the Lunenburg Folk Harbour Festival
- Joel Plaskett (born 1975), British-Canadian rock musician and songwriter
- Harriet Starr Stewart (1862–1931), Methodist philanthropist and editor, known for being the first woman in Canada and the British Empire to earn a Bachelor of Arts
- Logan Taylor (born 2002), National Football League player
- Tim Zuck (1947–2022), painter and educator

== Panoramic View ==
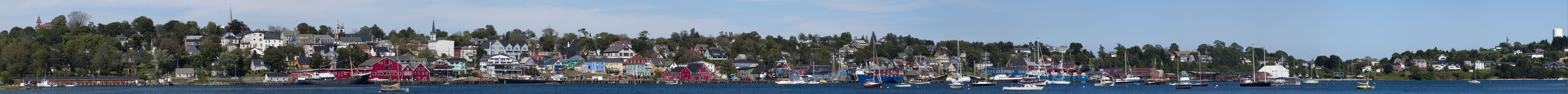
Panoramic View

== See also ==
- Lunenburg English
- Royal eponyms in Canada
- Charles Morris: surveyor who laid out Halifax, Lunenburg, Lawrencetown, and Liverpool.
- Halifax and South Western Railway: former railway line that served the South Shore.
