= St. George's (Round) Church (Halifax, Nova Scotia) =

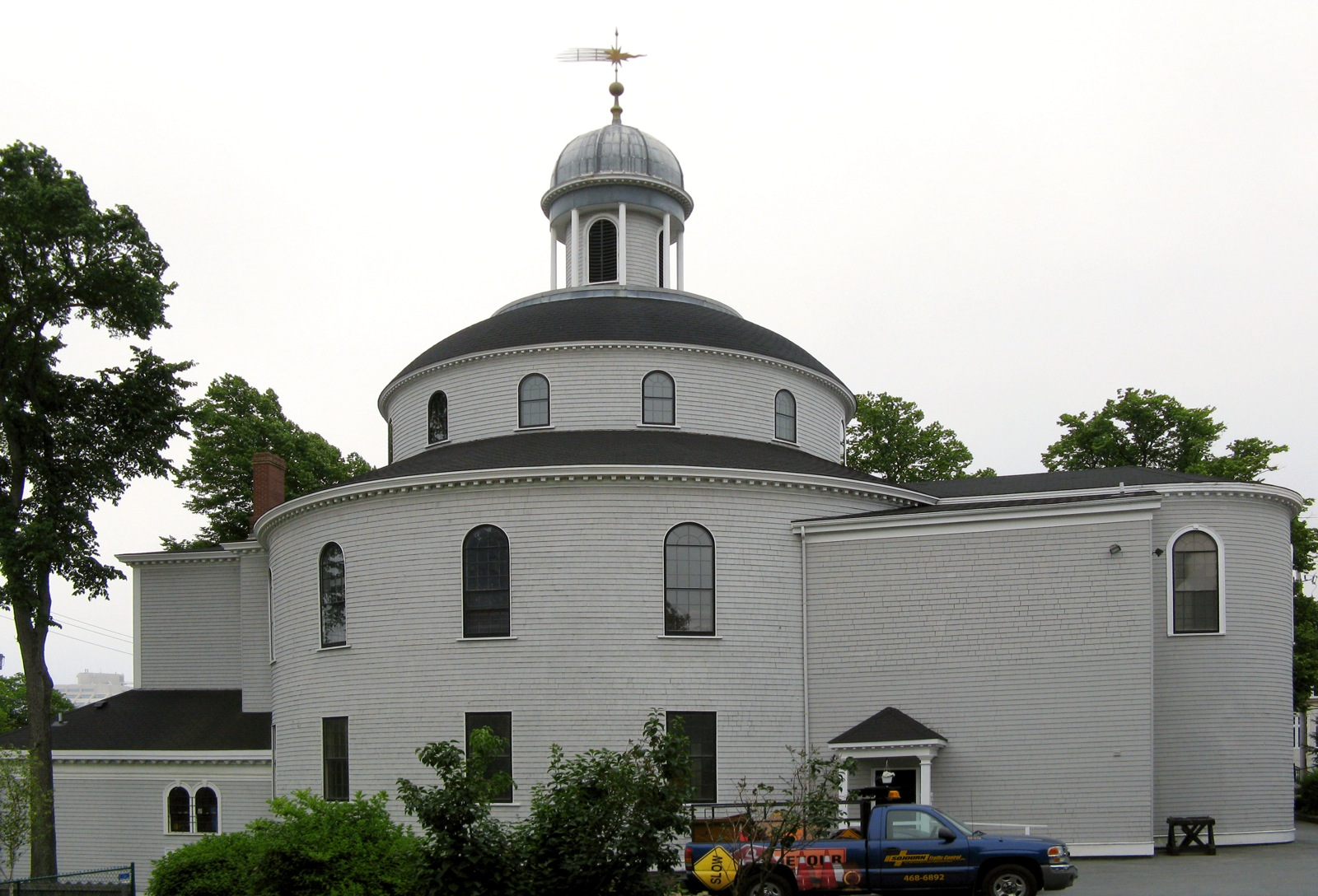
- St George's Round Church, view from the Northwest
- St. George's (Round) Church
- 44.6534°N 63.5829°W
- Location: Halifax, Nova Scotia
- Country: Canada
- Denomination: Anglican Church of Canada
- Churchmanship: High church
- Website: Official Website

History
- Status: Parish church
- Founded: 1756 (as the Little Dutch (Deutsch) Church); 1827 (as the Parish of St. George)
- Dedication: Saint George

Architecture
- Functional status: Active
- Style: Palladian
- Groundbreaking: 1800
- Completed: 1812 (Original structure); 1827 (Addition of the apsidal chancel and entrance); 2000 (Restoration)

Specifications
- Materials: Wood

Administration
- Province: Canada
- Diocese: Nova Scotia and Prince Edward Island

Clergy
- Rector: Gary Thorne

National Historic Site of Canada
- Official name: St. George's Anglican Church / Round Church National Historic Site of Canada
- Designated: 18 November 1983

Nova Scotia Heritage Property Act
- Type: Provincially Registered Property
- Designated: 8 April 1999

St. George's (Anglican) Round Church is a wooden round church in the neo-Classical Palladian style located in Halifax Regional Municipality in Downtown Halifax. Construction on the church began in 1800 thanks in large part to the financial backing of the British royal family. The church’s primary architect remains a mystery, but Prince Edward, Duke of Kent and Strathearn (and father of Queen Victoria) was highly influential & involved in the design process. It is located at the corner of Brunswick and Nora Bernard Streets in the North End district. The church was designated a National Historic Site of Canada in 1983 given its associations with the early history of Halifax and its Palladian architecture.

== History ==
=== German protestant roots ===
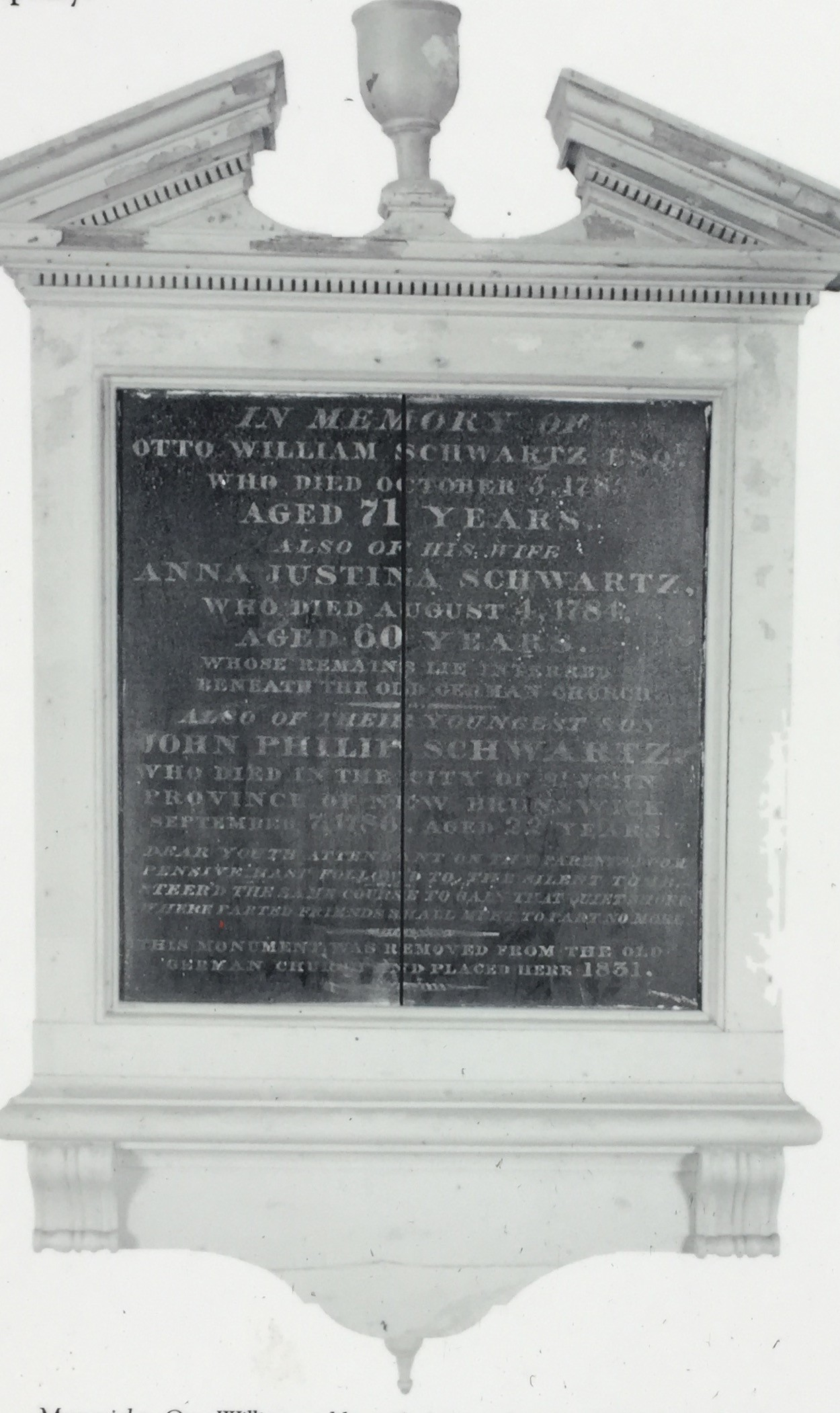
Otto William Schwartz (tablet removed from Little Dutch Church to St. George's Round Church in 1831)

The congregation of the Round Church was founded at the much smaller Little Dutch (Deutsch) Church, located just a few blocks north at the corner of Brunswick and Gerrish Streets. The Little Dutch Church was founded by German Lutherans who had settled in Halifax by special command by Edward Cornwallis, who deemed the other settlers of Halifax to be unsatisfactory for founding a church. These "Foreign Protestants", who were among the founding members of Halifax, started construction on the Little Dutch Church in 1756. These settlers used a house they had acquired after trading lumber and converted it into a one-room church, known as a "saalkirche". Construction on the pioneer church was finished in 1758 and the steeple and belfry were later added in 1760.

The congregation was extremely poor, but they badly wanted a German Lutheran minister. Services were originally held in German, preached by laypersons and were of an evangelical Lutheran bent, despite the church falling under the supervision of St. Paul's Church. However, in 1784, the congregation was granted their wish for a German Lutheran minister with Bernard Michael Houseal. Because of the congregation's poverty, they could not afford the minister by themselves. In order to keep their minister, the only option the congregation was presented with was by fulfilling the conditions of the Society for the Propagation of the Gospel to gain their support. Thereby, the church became officially Anglican but retained its Lutheran traditions. Just over 40 years later, the congregation outgrew the LDC and work on The Round Church began.

=== Construction of the Round Church ===
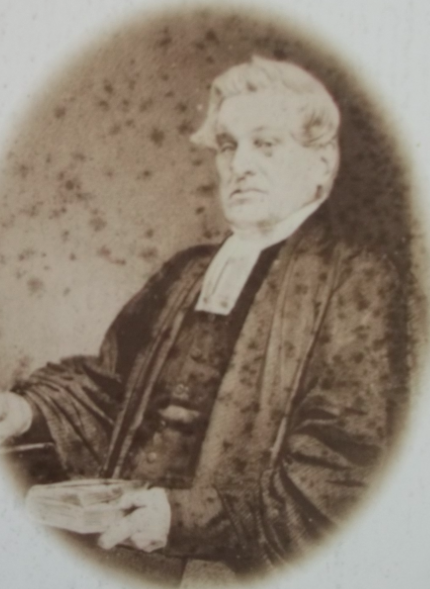
Reverend Robert Fitzgerald Uniacke - Rector (1825-1870)

At the end of the 18th century, Halifax was a colonial outpost that lacked aesthetically pleasing public buildings. Prince Edward, who was stationed with the Halifax garrison between 1794 and 1800, was determined to rectify this situation. He spearheaded a building campaign that included the construction of the Prince's Lodge (Music Room), the Martello Tower, Halifax Citadel Clock Tower, and St. George's Round Church: all inspired by the Palladian style of architecture. Prince Edward, his elder brother Frederick and their father, George III supported preparations for the Round Church. George III was a particularly great contributor to the construction of the church with his £200 donation. At the request of the Prince, John Henry Fleiger was also involved with William Hughes and John Merrick in 1798-99 to prepare designs for a church in north Halifax.

The Rev. George Wright held the first service on July 19, 1801. There is also a plaque in the church commemorating the three crew members that died in the Invasion of Martinique (1809). St. George's ceased to be entirely circular following the addition of the apsidal chancel and entrance in 1827. The entrance was later altered to be more square, which, although less in keeping with the Palladian style of architecture, allows for a more convenient and accessible entrance. There was talk of converting the entrance back to being round during the restoration project of the 1980s, but those plans did not come to fruition.

=== Early financial troubles ===
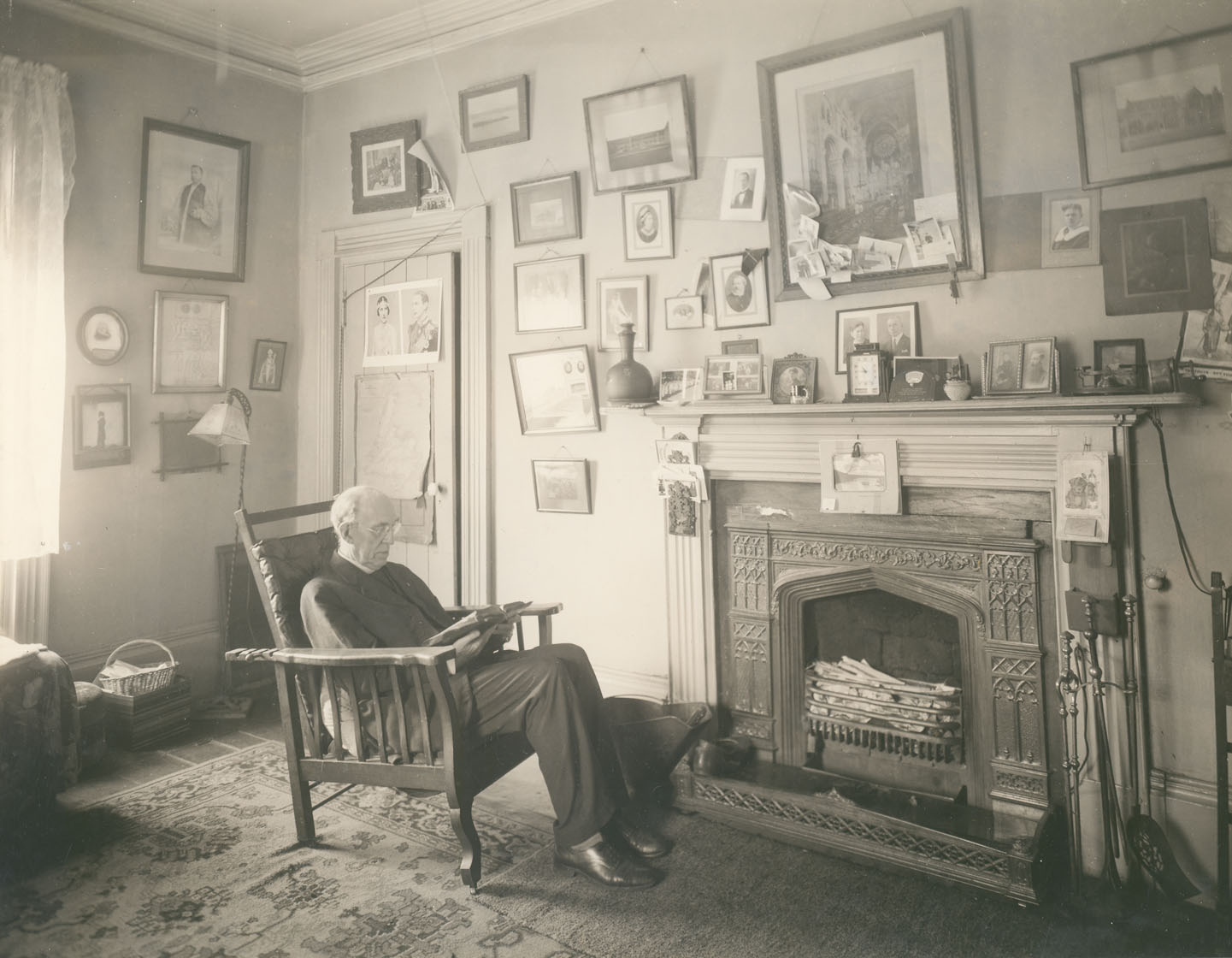
Rev. Canon Henry Ward Cunningham, D.D., Rector (1990–1937), photographed in the St. George's Rectory, 28 September 1937

The cost of the church was high and the congregation, never wealthy, struggled to settle it. Private donations, subscriptions, and pew leases made up a great deal of the funds. However, problems arose because some of the funds were contingent on St George's full adoption of the doctrines of the Church of England. The congregation agreed to follow Anglican liturgical practices and employ an Anglican priest, but they refused to recognize Anglican hierarchy. The congregation worried that the Anglican Church would swallow St George's. They insisted upon maintaining their German governing rules and that the church's property remain in the hands of the elder and wardens, not the diocese.

Instead of honouring the written promises from the congregation to establish Anglican liturgy and clergy at St George's, Bishop Charles Inglis worked against the Round Church. Inglis re-routed funds, explicitly dissuaded donors from giving to the church, and proposed building a chapel of St Paul's in the vicinity to choke out the struggling congregation. In 1811, desperate and facing financial ruin, the congregation finally surrendered and submitted themselves fully to the authority of the Church of England – and of the bishop. The only thing that the largely-German congregation refused to relinquish was the property and buildings of St George's, which remain to this day the property of those holding the offices of Rector and Wardens.

Regardless of the internal debate, Bishop Charles Inglis was less than impressed with the outcome. Despite the concessions made by the German congregation, Inglis suggested to the Society for the Propagation of the Gospel (SPG) that St George’s be abandoned as an Anglican church. As a result, the monies promised by the SPG and the Governor's office were withheld from the struggling congregation. Then, claiming he had no power or persuasion over either organization, Inglis refused St. George's financial support and threatened the church with closure.

Unfortunately for Inglis, his harsh stance was ineffective and pushed the already alienated congregation over the edge. Instead of caving, as he had hoped, they informed his Reverence that they did not need his money and that they would not be selling their church for funds. Even without a completed interior, they had enough money to fix leaks in the church's roof and that would be enough. They also repealed some of the inclusive changes they had made to appease Inglis earlier. For example, members of the Church of England could attend services, but only the descendants of German Lutherans were granted voting rights. Inglis's successor, Bishop Robert Stanser was willing to compromise, and in 1819 St George’s finally received the funds it had been promised in exchange for adopting Anglican liturgy and internal structure.

Under the leadership of Reverend Robert Fitzgerald Uniacke, St. George's became its own independent parish in 1827.

=== Involvement with Titanic ===
Halifax was used as a point of return for many of the rescue operations going to Titanic. Included in one of these rescue and retrieval missions was CS Minia, whose commander, Captain deCarteret, asked that his own rector accompany the voyage to conduct memorial services at sea. As thanks, Father Henry Ward Cunningham, was presented with a deck chair from Titanic, which he in turn donated to the Maritime Museum of the Atlantic.

St. George's was further involved in the sinking of Titanic when the funeral of the Unknown Child (now identified as Sidney Leslie Goodwin) took place at St. George's. Sidney Goodwin has since been moved to the Fairview Lawn Cemetery, with many other graves of the victims of Titanic.

=== Halifax Explosion ===
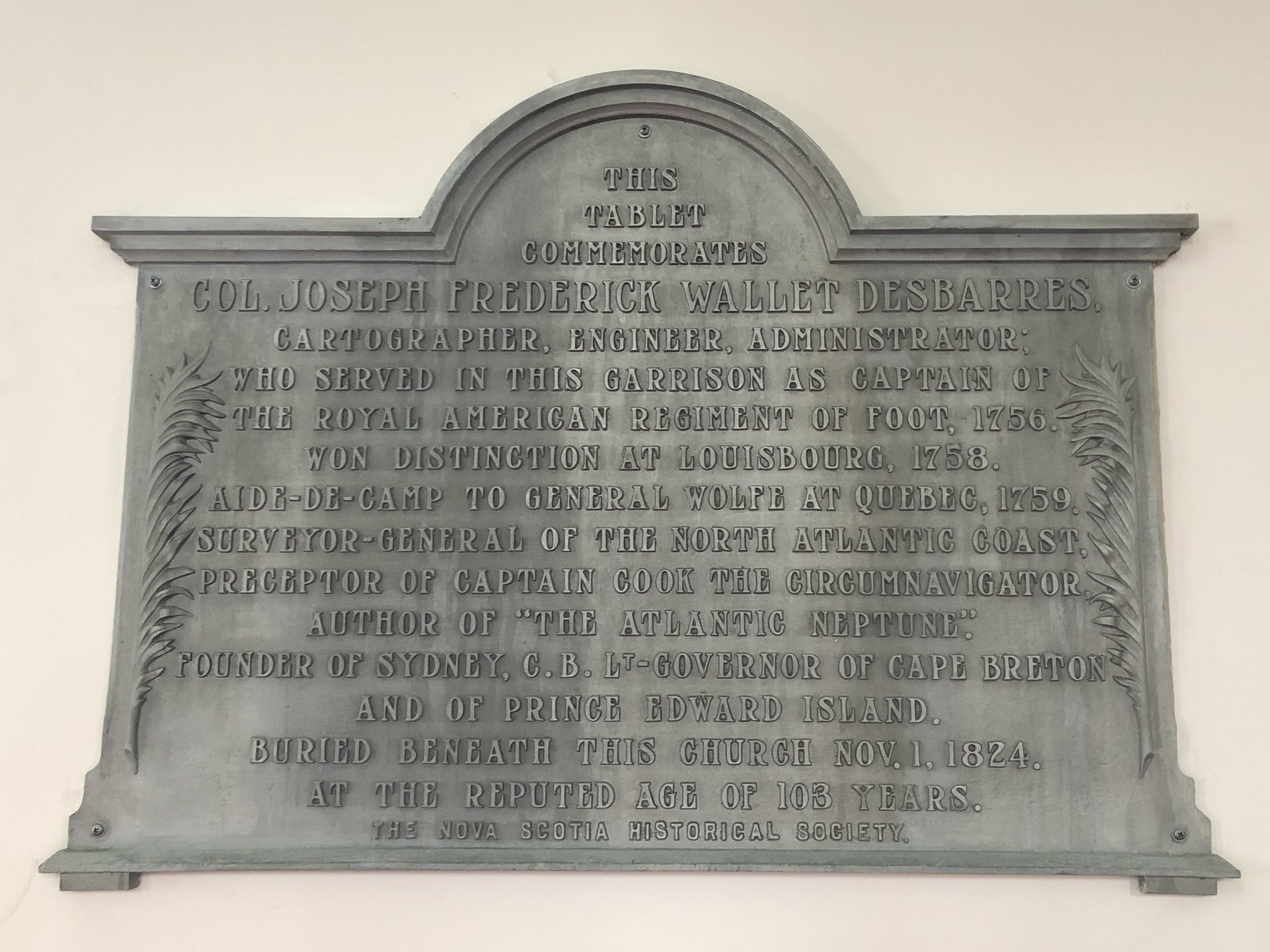
Joseph Frederick Wallet DesBarres Monument, St. George's Church, Halifax, Nova Scotia

Given St. George's location in Halifax's North End neighbourhood so close to point zero of the Halifax Explosion, damages were far less extensive than might be expected. A large part of this may be due to being sheltered by St. Patrick's Catholic Church across the street. Apart from the windows and doors and a collapsed chimney, St. George's major loss was its organ, which was replaced with a 1912 Casavant organ. St. George's was so well-sheltered from the blast, in fact, that the rectory could shelter 22 people following the blast, even without windows or doors. The hall suffered structural damages; however, St. George's could generally count itself lucky for surviving the blast intact. St. George's lost 25 members of its parish, including 7 young children, from the explosion.

=== The fire ===
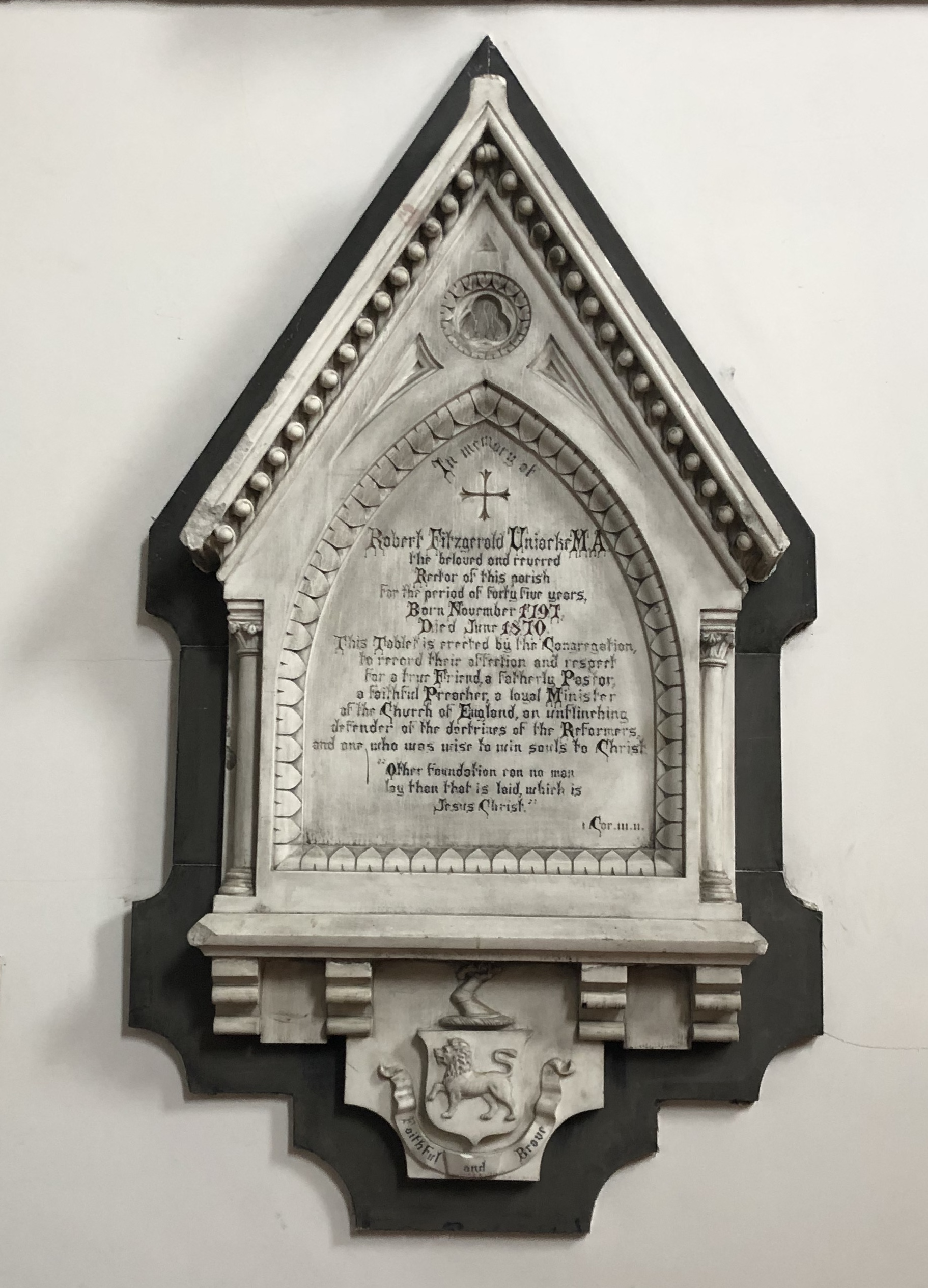
Robert Fitzgerald Uniacke Monument, St. George's Church, Halifax, Nova Scotia

On June 2, 1994, a fire was started in the basement, by children who found a way into the Round Church. The fire made its way up to the dome, causing it to crumble and destroying approximately 30 per cent of the building. The fundraising effort received a donation from Prince Charles, who had also attended service at the church in 1983 with Diana, Princess of Wales. Later in 1994, Prince Philip visited St. George's after taking a personal interest following the fire at Windsor Castle two years earlier; the province's gift to Queen Elizabeth II and the Duke during that visit made a $1,000 donation to the restoration project. In an effort to avoid debt, the restoration took six years to complete and happened in increments when funds were available. The project was completed in 2000 and came in under budget at $4.6 million.

== Rectors ==
No.	Name	Dates	Notes
1	Bernard Houseal	1786–1799	Pastor at the Little Dutch Church
2	George Wright	1799–1819	Pastor at the Little Dutch Church; first Rector of the Round Church proper
3	Benjamin Gray	1819–1825	
4	Robert Fitzgerald Uniacke	1825–1870	
5	James Boyle Uniacke	1870–1881	
6	Francis Partridge	1881–1895	
7	Henry Herbert Pittman	1895–1900	
8	Henry Ward Cunningham	1900–1937	
9	Carmon Stone	1937–1946	
10	Hayward G. Hodder	1958–1980	
11	Robert "Bob" Petite	1980–1989	
12	Gary Thorne	1990–2005	
—	James Purchase	2005–2007	Interim priest-in-charge
13	George Westhaver	2007–2013	
14	Christopher Snook	2014–2017	
—	James Purchase	2017–2018	Interim priest-in-charge
15	Nicholas Hatt	2018–2024	
—	Gary Thorne	2024–2026	Interim priest-in-charge
16	Gary Thorne	Since 2026	

== St. George's YouthNet ==
St. George's YouthNet is a non-profit inner-city youth organization based in the North End of Halifax, Nova Scotia. Founded in 1998, it operates out of the St. George's Round Church Parish Hall. While the program is an outreach ministry of the parish, it is legally incorporated as the Saint George's YouthNet Society and maintains a non-proselytizing mandate, providing free educational and recreational programming to children and youth regardless of religious affiliation.

YouthNet was established in 1998 by the Reverend Gary Thorne, then-Rector of St. George's Round Church, in response to the social and economic challenges facing the Uniacke Square public housing neighborhood. Thorne envisioned the program as a bridge between the resources of the church and the University of King's College and the needs of local youth, focusing on mentorship and breaking cycles of poverty through friendship and social support.

In its early years, the program focused on lunch and after-school tutoring. It has since expanded into a multi-service organization that employs local youth as "Junior Leaders" and collaborates with various municipal and provincial partners.

== See also ==
- List of oldest buildings in Canada
- List of oldest buildings and structures in Halifax, Nova Scotia
