= Robert Field (painter) =

American painter (1769–1819)

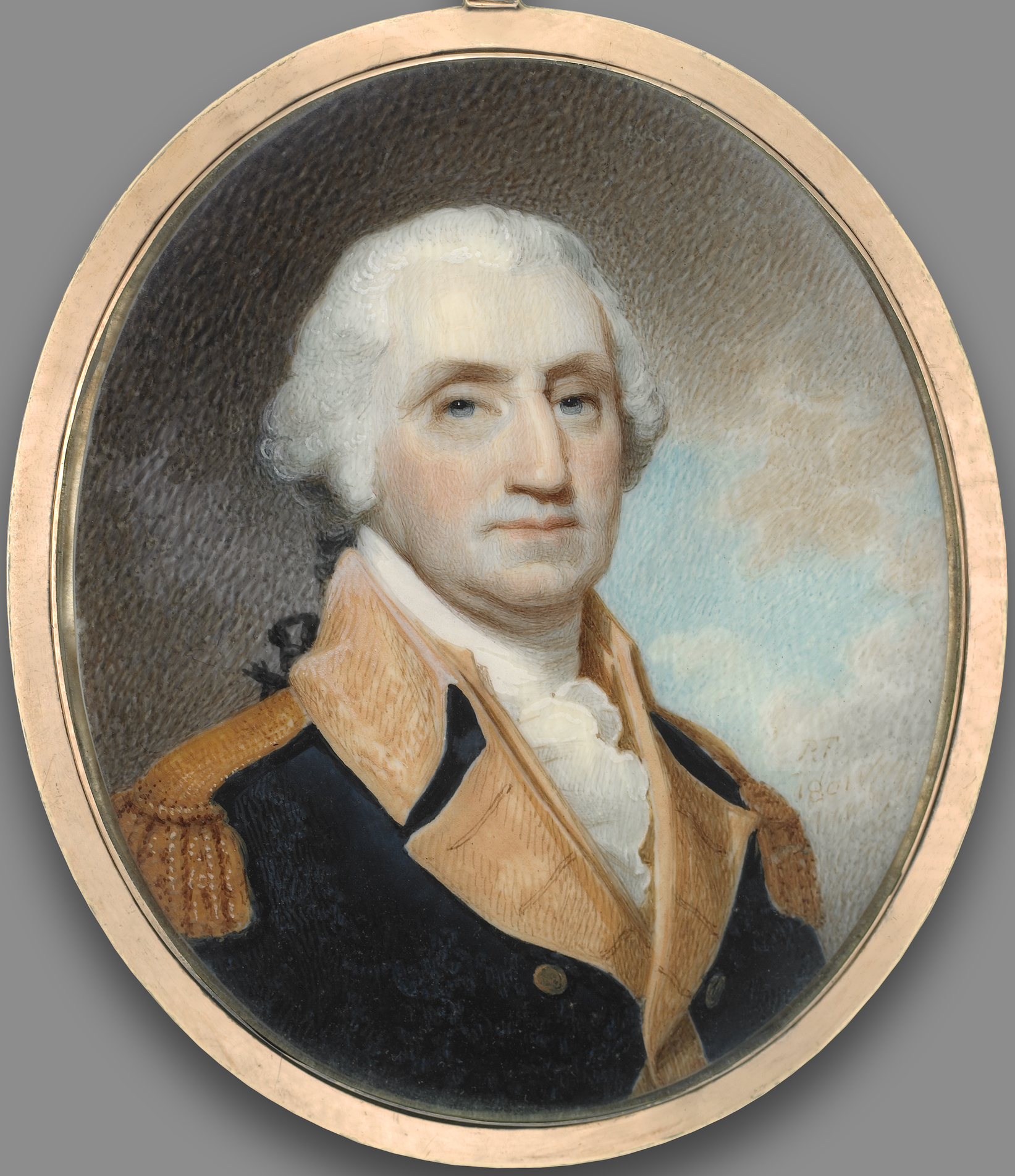
Field's miniature portrait of George Washington (1800), now housed at the Yale University Art Gallery

Robert Field (1769–1819) was a painter who was born in London and died in Kingston, Jamaica. According to art historian Daphne Foskett, author of A Dictionary of British Miniature Painters (1972), Field was "one of the best American miniaturists of his time." During Field's time in Nova Scotia at the beginning of the nineteenth century, he was the most professionally trained painter in present-day Canada. He worked in the conventional neo-classic portrait style of Henry Raeburn and Gilbert Stuart. His most famous works are two groups of miniatures of George Washington, commissioned by his wife Martha Washington. (Field's miniatures of both are in the Yale University Art Gallery permanent collection.)

== America ==
He received his early training at Royal Academy schools in London in 1790. In 1794, he moved to the United States, first living in Baltimore before taking up residence in Philadelphia, the nation's first capital. In Philadelphia, Field immediately joined a group of artists led by Charles Willson Peale in establishing the Columbianum, or American Academy of the Fine Arts, which was eventually superseded by the Pennsylvania Academy of the Fine Arts in 1805.

Field spent 14 years in the U.S., working as a miniature painter in Baltimore, Philadelphia, Washington, D.C., and Boston. During this period, he produced miniatures of George and Martha Washington, Thomas Jefferson, and a wide range of people prominent in the social, economic, and political life of American society. According to historian Harry Piers, Field was one of the four most highly sought American miniaturists in his time. Martha Washington herself commissioned Field in 1800 to paint a group of miniature as mementoes for friends and family, to commemorate the revered General and President on the first anniversary of his death. Two groups of miniatures of George Washington were produced by Field at Martha's request in late 1800, the first group showing him in civilian dress, the second as general in full uniform.

== Nova Scotia ==
When tensions between America and England started to rise in the lead up to the War of 1812, Field remained a loyalist and moved from Boston to Halifax, Nova Scotia (1808). He served in the 1st Company of Halifax Volunteer Artillery in 1812. He became a member of the Charitable Irish Society of Halifax.

He continued to produce miniatures, but he also painted oil portraits of government officials, military officers, merchants, and assorted members of the Halifax "gentility"; among his subjects were Bishop Charles Inglis, former lieutenant governor Sir John Wentworth, Sir George Prevost, Sir John Coape Sherbrooke, Admiral of the Fleet Sir Provo William Parry Wallis, and Sir Alexander Forrester Inglis Cochrane, vice-admiral in the Royal Navy (whose portrait was shown at the Royal Academy exhibition in London in 1810). It was with Wentworth's patronage that Field set up his portrait studio, located in a bookshop. In his only eight years in the city, he painted perhaps as many as 150 full-scale and miniature portraits.

== Jamaica ==
In 1816 he moved to Jamaica, settling first in Montego Bay and then in Kingston. He died on 9 August 1819, apparently of yellow fever, and was buried in an unmarked grave in the old "West Ground" cemetery, now called the Strangers' Burial Ground, near the Kingston parish church.

== Gallery ==
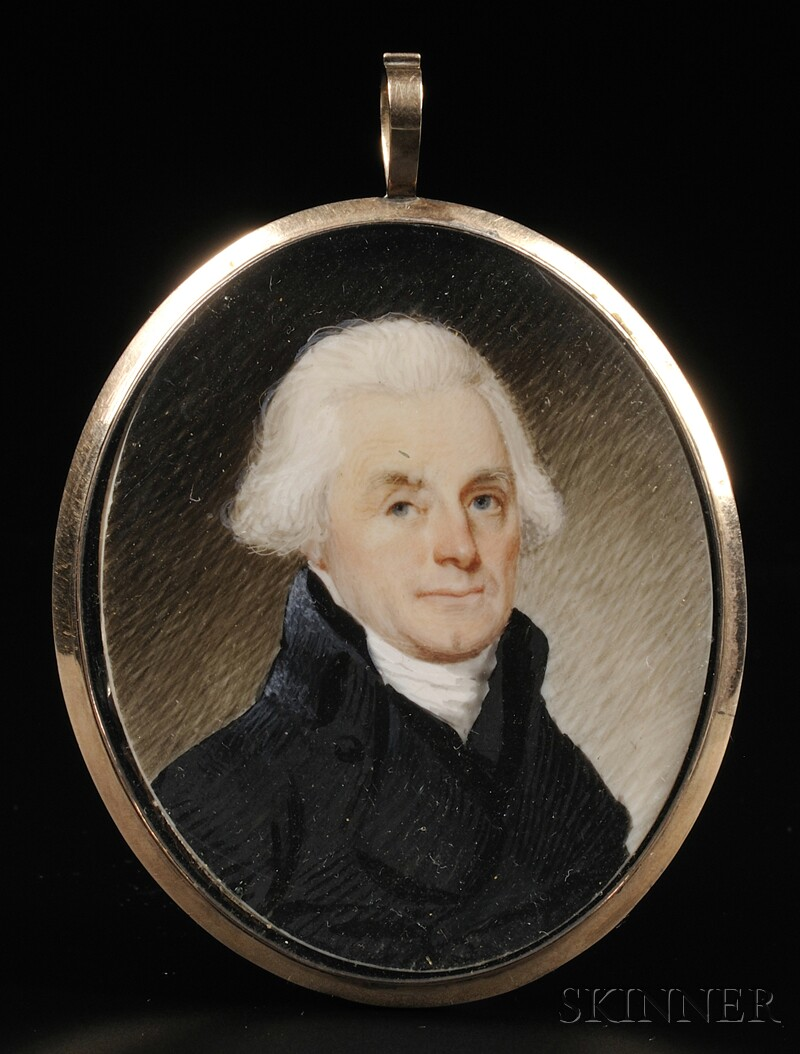
American President Thomas Jefferson

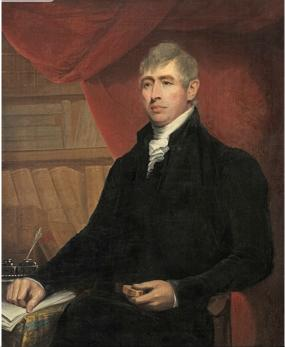
Richard John Uniacke (1811)

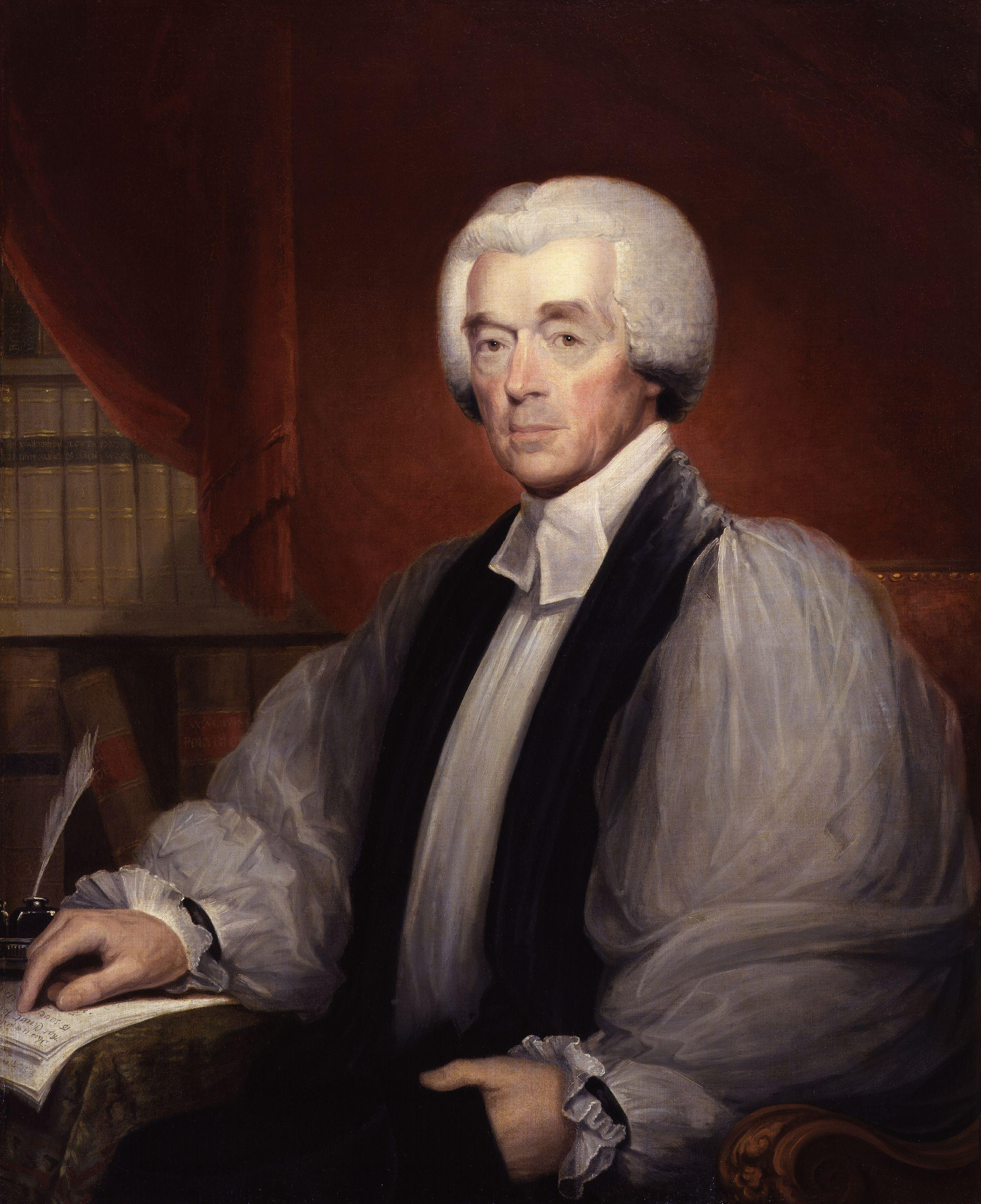
Charles Inglis (National Portrait Gallery, London)

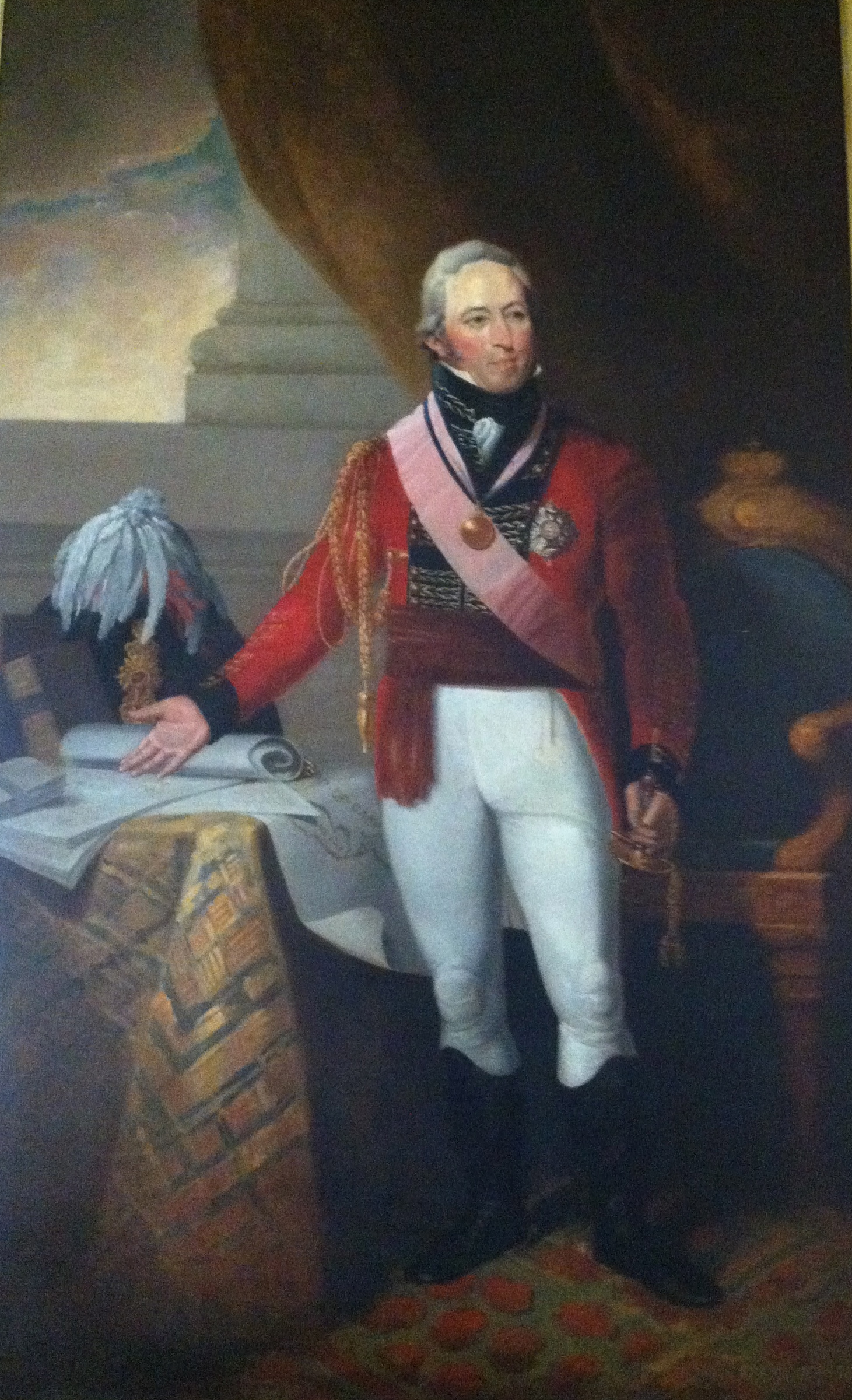
Sir John Coape Sherbrooke (The Halifax Club)

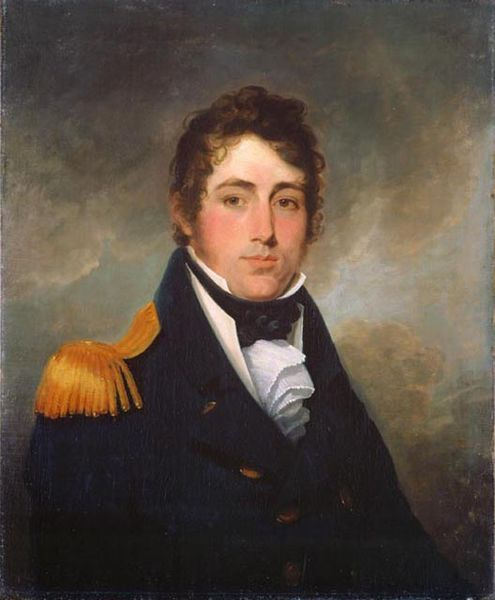
Provo Wallis, (National Gallery of Canada)

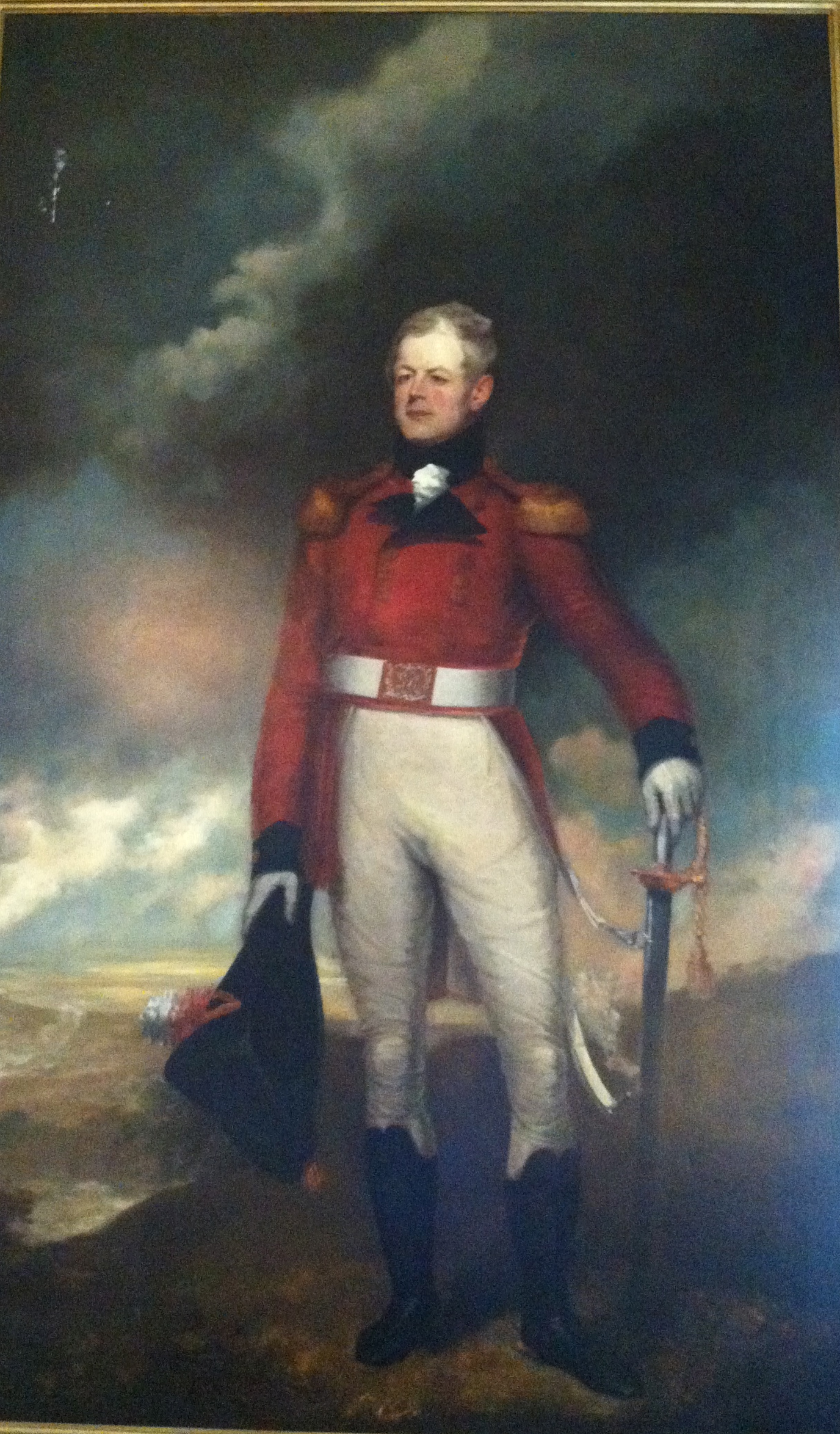
Sir George Prevost, The Halifax Club, Nova Scotia

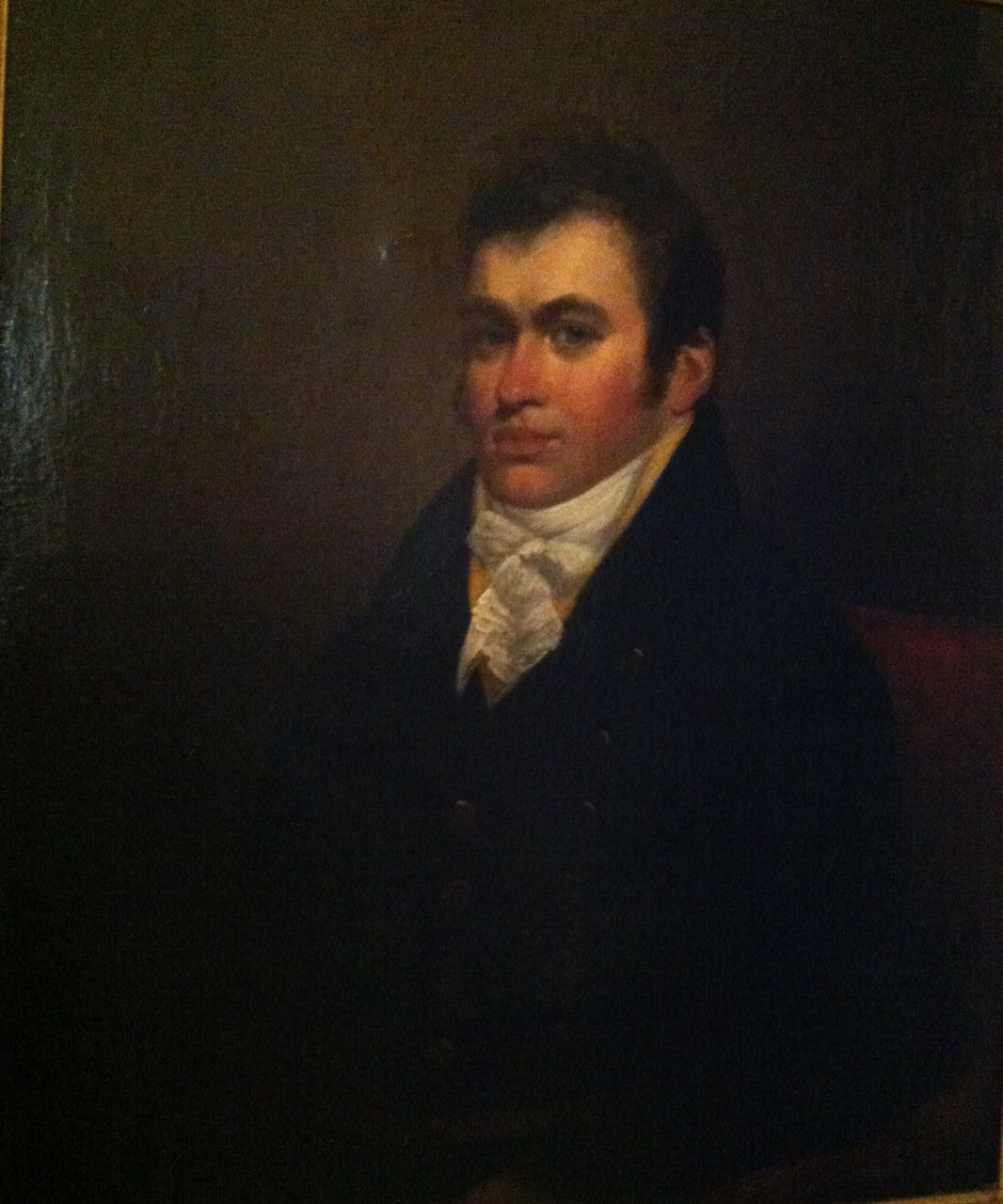
Matthew Richardson (merchant), (Government House (Nova Scotia)

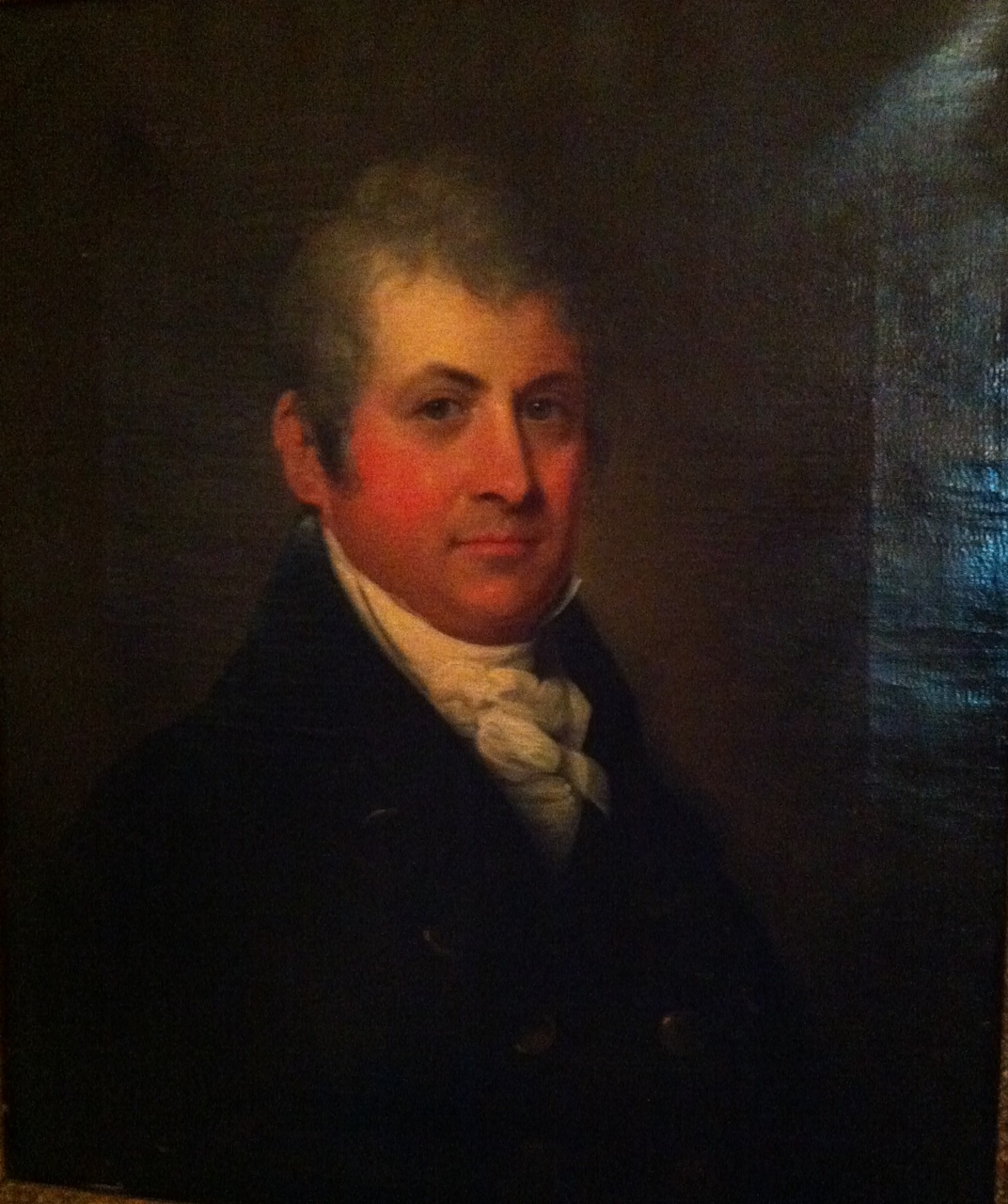
Andrew Belcher, Government House (Nova Scotia)

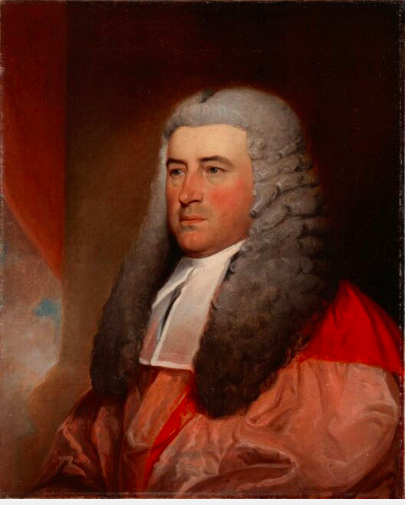
Sir Alexander Croke (National Gallery of Canada)

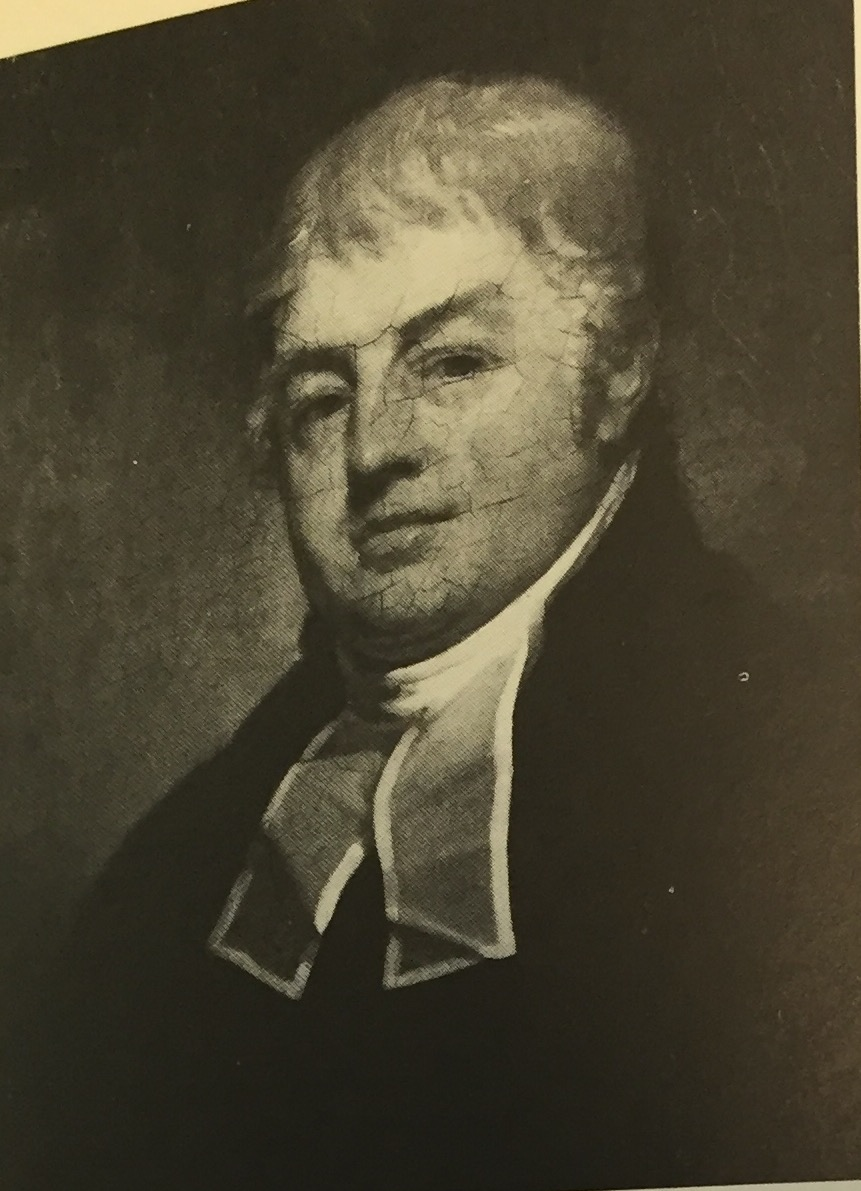
Rev Archibald Gray

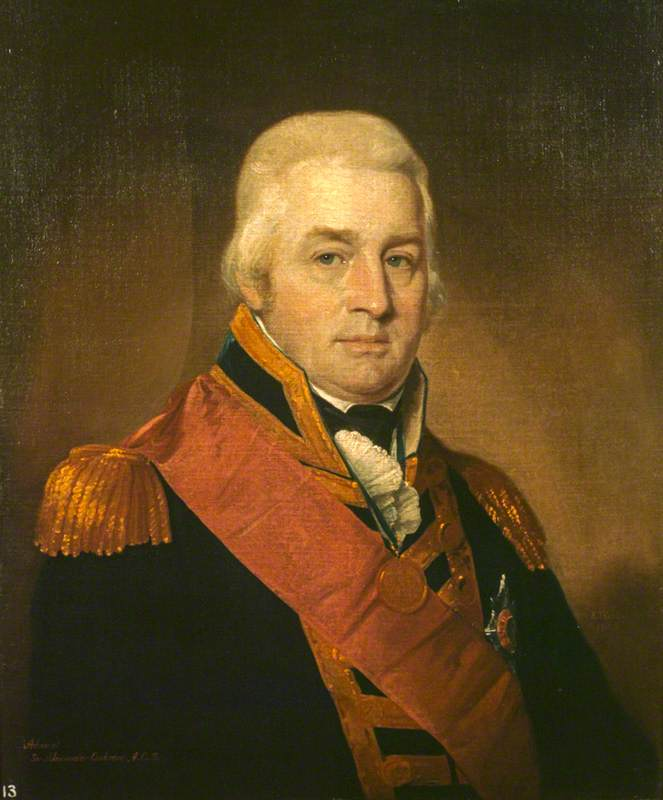
Admiral Sir Alexander Cochrane

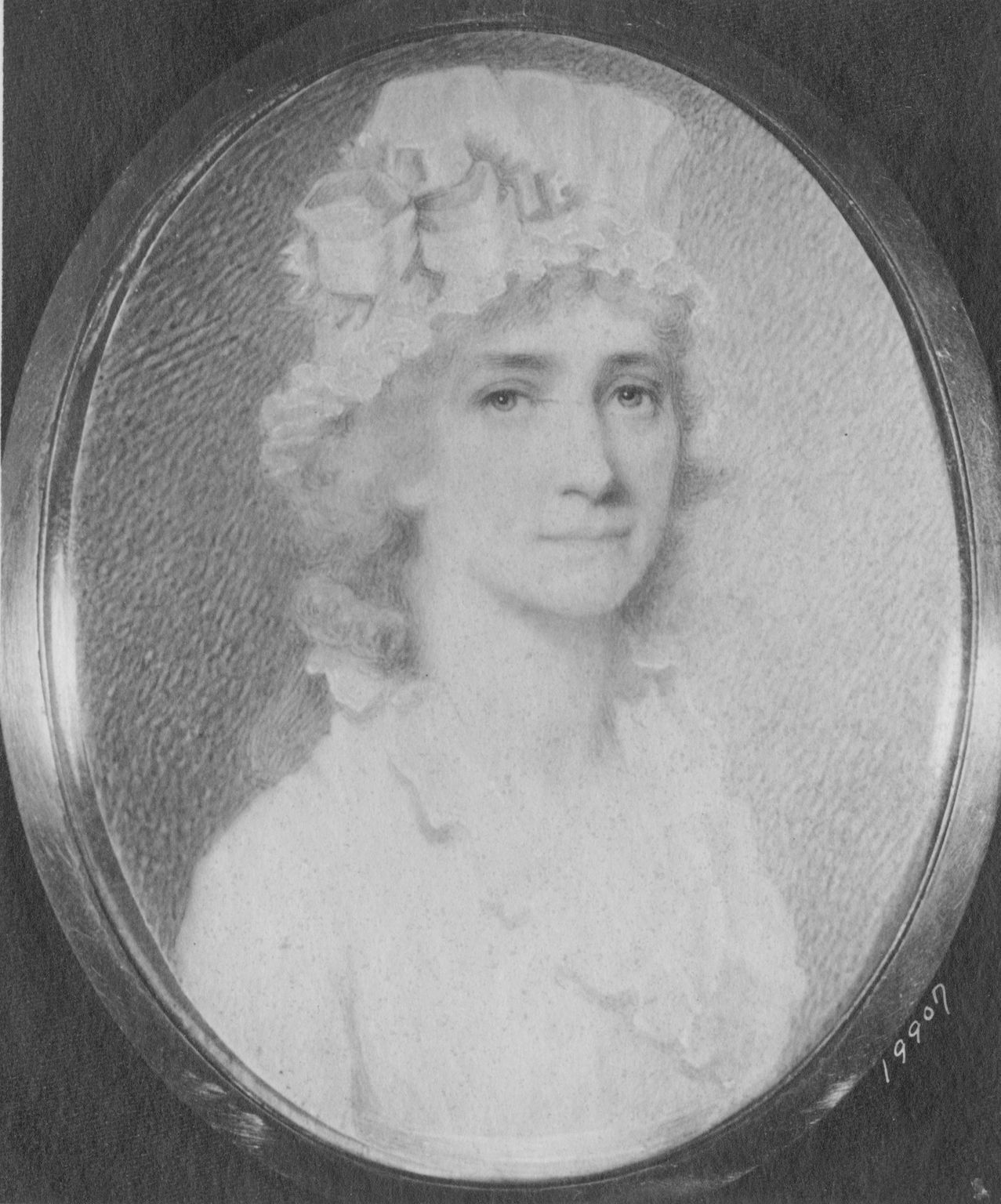
Anna Gray (1797), on ivory by Robert Field found at the Frick Art Research Library Photoarchive

== Other works ==
- Charles Austen and his wife (Jane Austen's brother)
- Brewer John Lewis, National Portrait Gallery, London - founder of Richmond Park
- Mrs. George Washington
- John Merrick (architect), (Province House)
- Sir Alexander Cochrane
- Sir Edward Parry
- Commissioner John Nicholson Inglefield
- Hon. Michael Wallace
- Hon. Lawrence Hartshorne
- Hon. Charles Morris, 3rd
- Adam DeChezeau
- Rev. Dr. Archibald Gray and Mrs. Gray
- Andrew Wrightand sister Mary
- Dr. William J. Almon
- Hon. James Fraser
- Judge James Stewart
- Sir John Wentworth, 1st Baronet
- Dr. John Halliburton
- Charles Geddes
- John Bremner
- Captain Thomas Maynard, R. N.
- Rear Admiral Herbert Sawyer
- Hon. William Lawson (banker) (Bank of Nova Scotia)
- Dr. Joseph Prescott
- Dr. Mather Byles
- Captain Nicholas Thomas Hill
