= John Inglis (bishop) =

Third bishop of the Diocese of Nova Scotia

The Right Reverend John Inglis
- Bishop of Nova Scotia
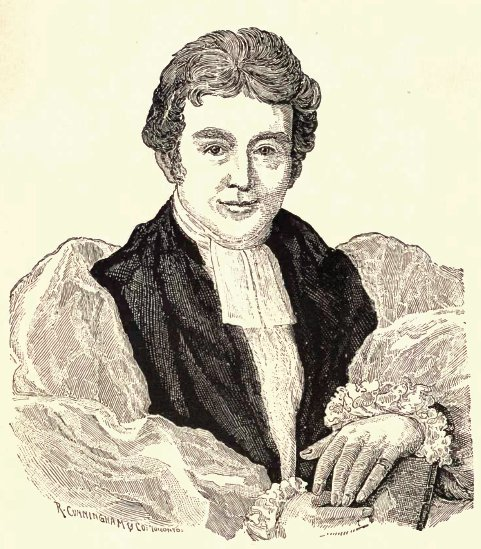
- 1896 sketch of Inglis
- Church: Church of England
- See: Nova Scotia
- In office: 1825–1850

Orders
- Ordination: 27 June 1802
- Consecration: March 1825

Personal details
- Born: 9 December 1777
- Died: 27 October 1850 (aged 72)

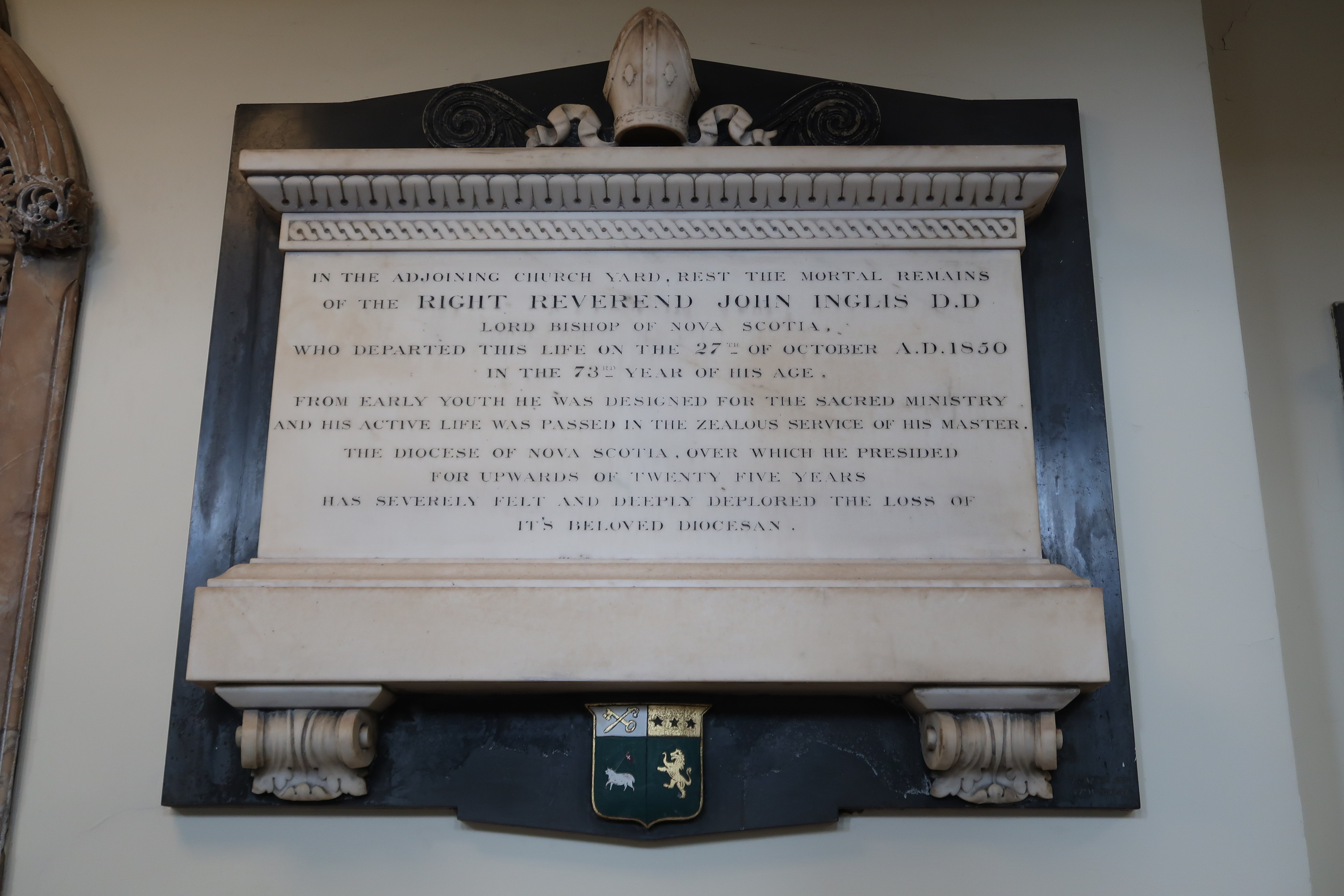
Wall plaque in St Mary's Church, Battersea, London UK where John Inglis DD is buried

John Inglis (9 December 1777 – 27 October 1850) was the third bishop of the Diocese of Nova Scotia, serving at St. Paul's Church (Halifax). He was the son of Bishop Charles Inglis. He is buried at St Mary's Church, Battersea, England.

== Life ==
John Inglis was ordained a deacon December 13, 1801 by Bishop Charles Inglis, his father. On 27 June 1802 he was ordained a priest.

John was appointed as official secretary and as ecclesiastical commissary to his father. This involved a number of trips to England on behalf of the diocese. These trips also enhanced his own career and brought focus on his talents. However, his relative inexperience and the overtones of nepotism did not allow his promotion in 1812 when the bishop was seriously incapacitated.

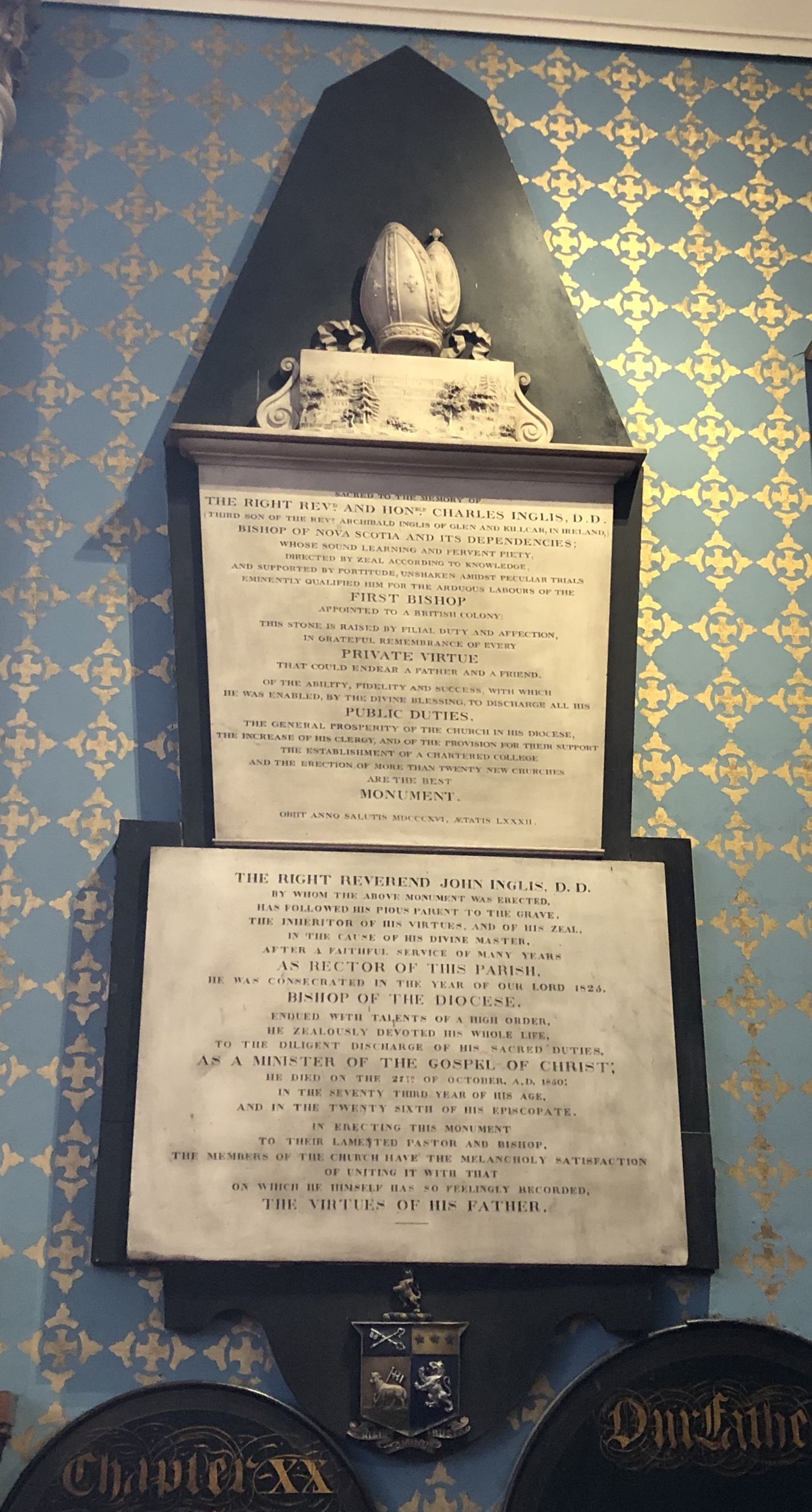
Charles and son John Inglis memorial, St. Paul's Church, Halifax, Nova Scotia

Inglis became the third bishop in 1825. He was consecrated 26/27 March 1825. In the 25 years preceding this elevation, he had proven to be a talented and caring priest. He had been chaplain to the House of Assembly, a stalwart ally of King's College, and a defender of the official position of the Church of England. He died on 27 October 1850.

Shortly after his return to Nova Scotia, he divided the diocese into four archdeaconries. The archdeacons and locations are shown below.

- Ven. George Best, Archdeacon of New Brunswick
- Ven. George Coster, Archdeacon of Newfoundland
- Ven. Aubrey Spencer, Archdeacon of Bermuda
- Ven. Dr. Robert Willis, Archdeacon of Nova Scotia and Rector of St. Paul's, Halifax

=== Supreme Court Lawsuit ===
Inglis was an 1826 challenger to the will of his distant cousin Captain Robert Richard Randall; the will as written created Sailors' Snug Harbor, a home for decrepit seamen. This legal challenge reached the United States Supreme Court; following the second Trump Administration's efforts to end birthright citizenship via executive order, this case was cited in public discourse.

Religious titles
Preceded by Robert Stanser	Anglican Bishop of Nova Scotia; 1825–1850	Succeeded by Hibbert Binney
