= Robert Fitzgerald Uniacke =

Canadian clergyman (1797-1870)

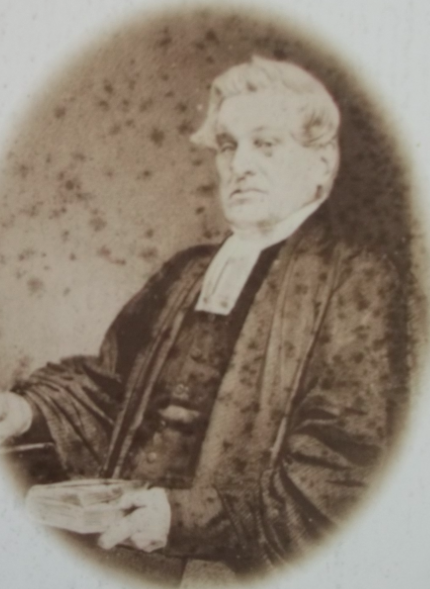
Robert Fitzgerald Uniacke

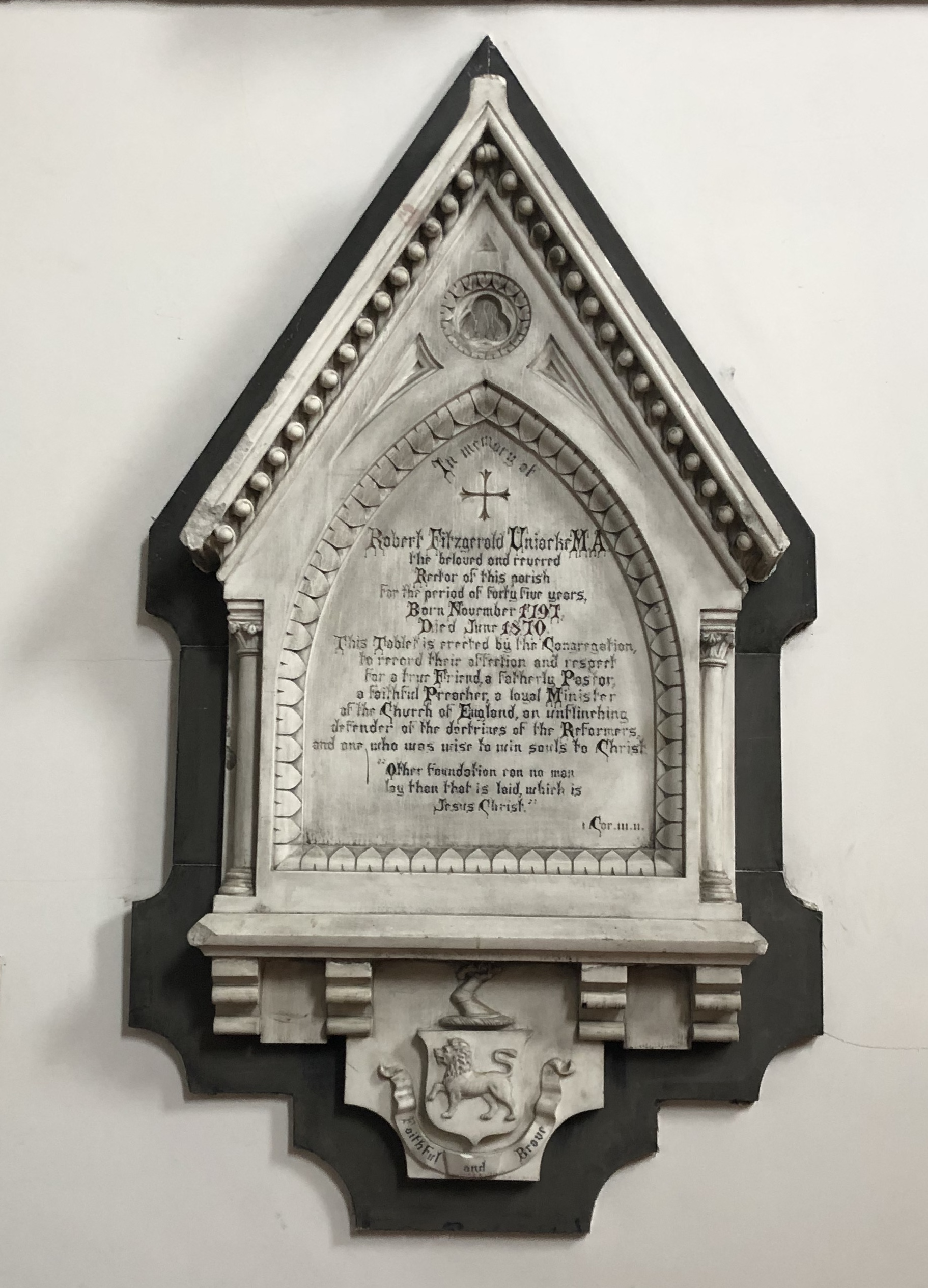
Robert Fitzgerald Uniacke Monument, St. George's Church, Halifax, Nova Scotia

Robert Fitzgerald Uniacke (24 December 1797– 1 June 1870) was a clergyman and also the fourth son of Richard John Uniacke.

Uniacke lived in Halifax, Nova Scotia. Deciding against a career in his father's law firm, he was ordained into the Church of England, in England. He served at St. George's Church and is buried in the graveyard of the Little Dutch (Deutsch) Church.
