= John Merrick (architect) =

Canadian architect

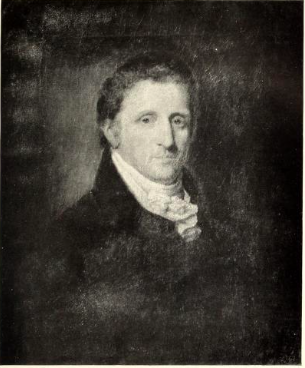
John Merrick by Robert Field

John Merrick (1756–1829) was a Canadian architect. He designed St. George's Round Church and Province House (Nova Scotia), where his portrait is mounted.
