= George Best (priest) =

George Best (c. 1793 – 2 May 1829) was a Church of England priest in Maritime Canada.

Best married Elizabeth Stanser, a daughter of Robert Stanser who was the bishop of Nova Scotia, on 21 August 1820. When the diocese of Nova Scotia was divided into four sub-sections, he was selected for one of them and was appointed the first archdeacon of New Brunswick in 1824. This position was under the direction of John Inglis who had succeeded Stanser as bishop. He was also reluctantly the first president of King's College, Fredericton. He was succeeded as archdeacon by George Coster, who was the archdeacon of Newfoundland.
