= Robert Willis (minister) =

Canadian minister (1785–1865)

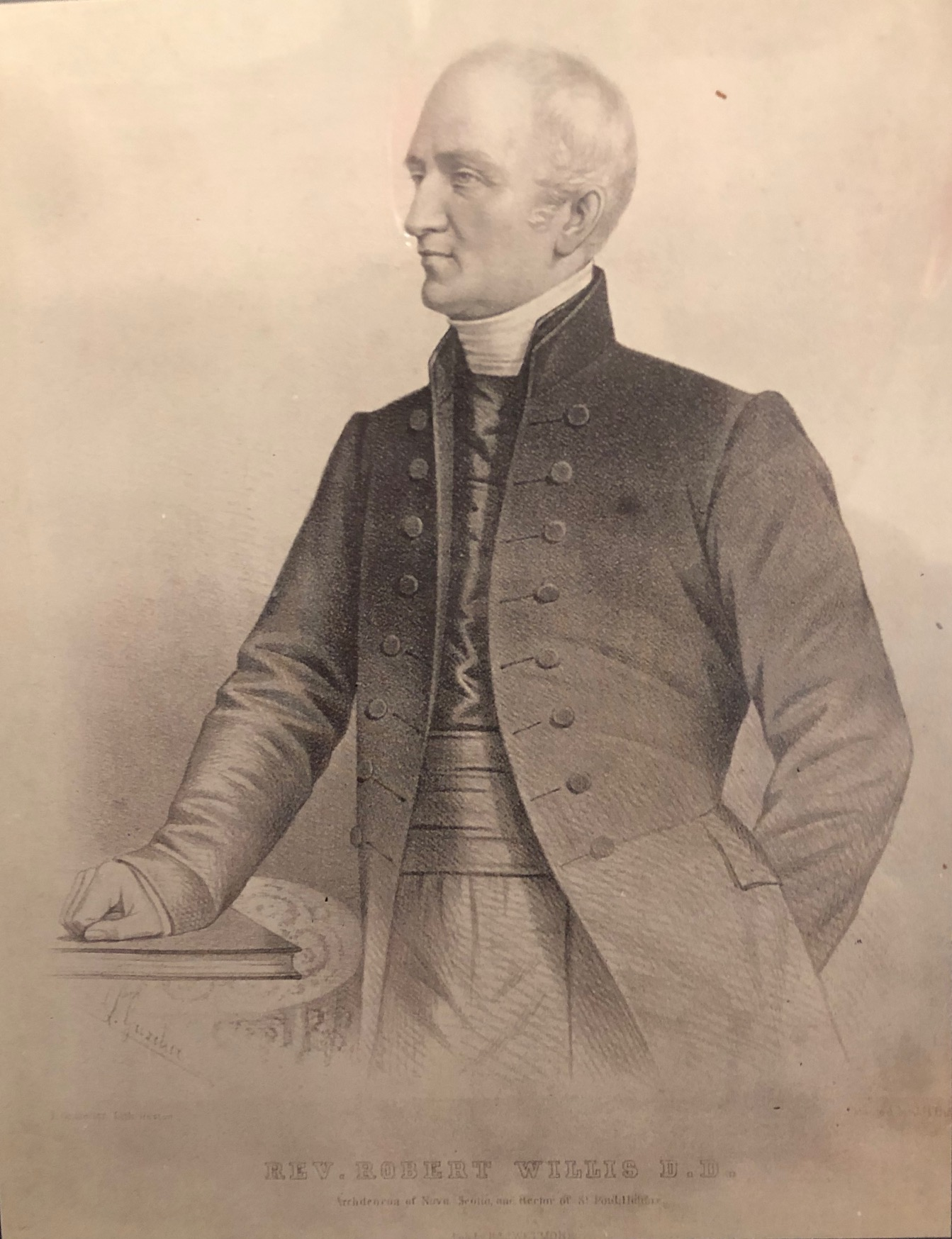
Rev. Robert Willis, St. Paul's Church, Halifax, Nova Scotia

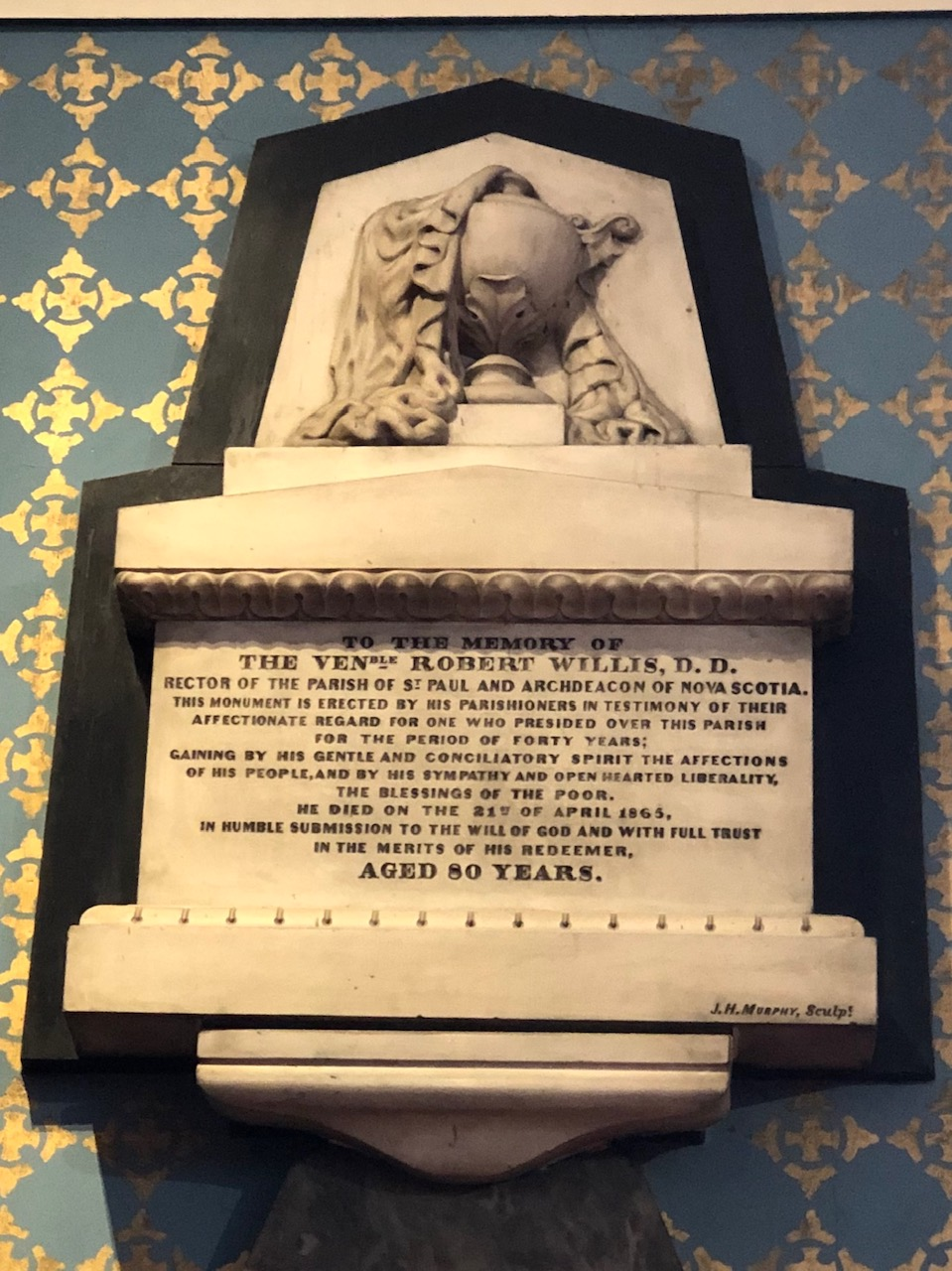
Rev. Robert Willis monument by James H. Murphy, St. Paul's Church (Halifax)

Rev. Robert Willis (6 August 1785 – 21 April 1865) was the longest serving minister of St. Paul's Church (Halifax) (1824-1865). He was trained Lincoln College, Oxford, serving in Richmond, Yorkshire. After working for the Royal Navy, Willis was posted to Newfoundland and then New Brunswick.

In 1824, he was posted to Halifax. His appointment was met with opposition and two thirds of the congregation vacated to St. George’s Church and others established an independent chapel that later joined the Baptiste Church.
