= Robert Stanser =

English bishop (1760–1828)

- Bishop of Nova Scotia
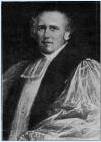
- Church: Church of England
- Archdiocese: Nova Scotia and Prince Edward Island
- Predecessor: Charles Inglis
- Successor: John Inglis

Personal details
- Born: 16 March 1760 Harthill, Yorkshire, England
- Died: 23 December 1828 (aged 68) Hampton, England

Robert Stanser (16 March 1760 – 23 December 1828) was an English Church of England bishop. He was the second Bishop of Nova Scotia from 1816 to 1824.

Born in England, Stanser was educated at St John's College, Cambridge. He was ordained deacon in 1783 and priest in 1784. In 1791, he was appointed to St Paul's Church in Halifax, Nova Scotia, and was soon inducted as the rector. He supported the Royal Acadian School.

In 1815, his wife died and was buried in the crypt of St. Paul's Church. In 1816, he was consecrated Bishop of Nova Scotia. However, for health reasons, he returned to England in 1817 where he was to remain. He retired in 1824 and was succeeded by John Inglis. He died in Hampton, London in 1828.

A daughter of his married George Best who became the first archdeacon of New Brunswick.

Religious titles
Preceded by Charles Inglis	Anglican Bishop of Nova Scotia; 1816-1824	Succeeded by John Inglis
