= Charles Inglis (bishop) =

Irish Anglican clergyman (1734–1816)

The Right Reverend Charles Inglis
- Bishop of Nova Scotia
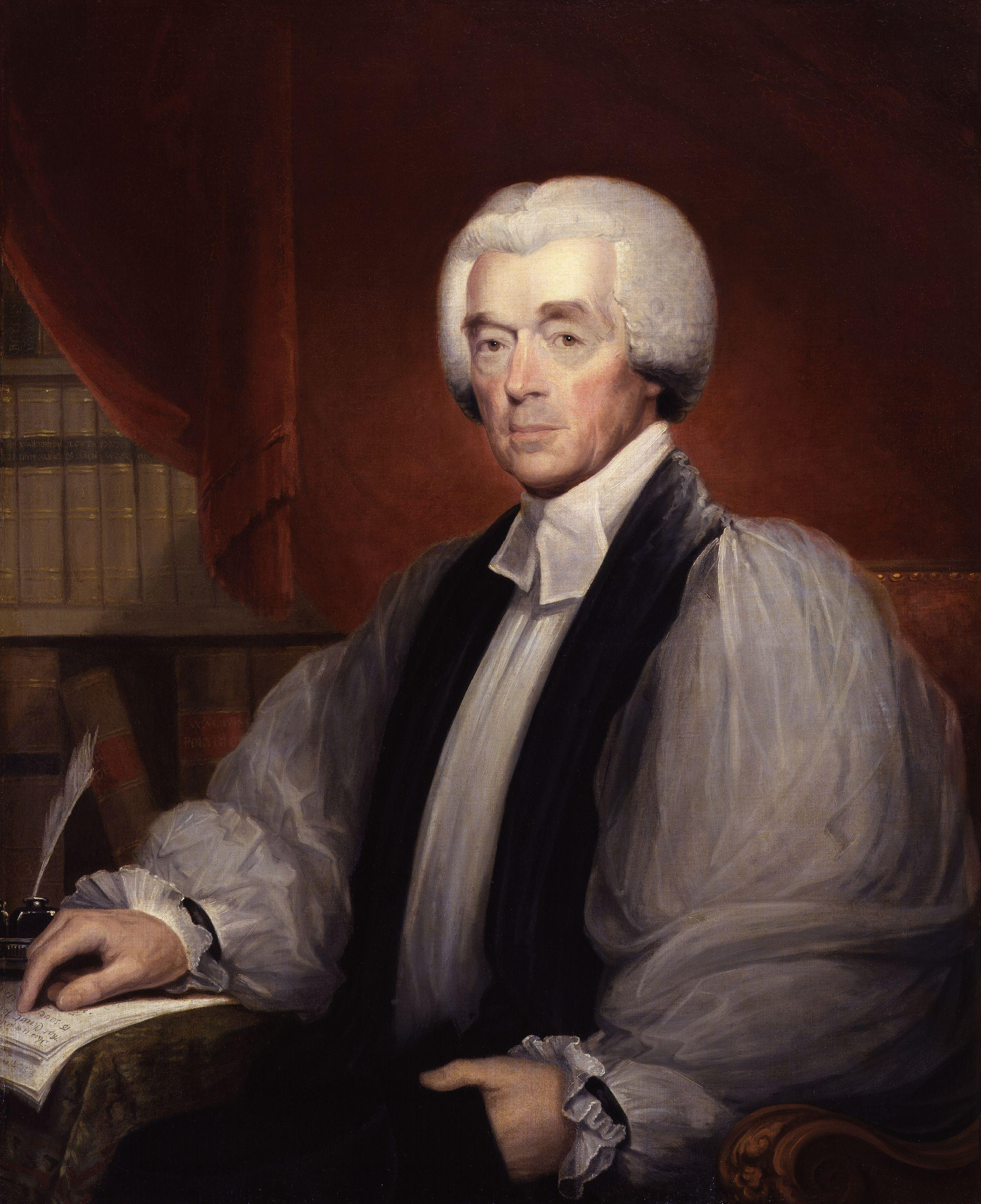
- Church: Church of England
- See: Nova Scotia
- In office: 1787–1816
- Previous post: Rector of Trinity Church, New York

Orders
- Consecration: 1787

Personal details
- Born: 1734 Glencolmcille, County Donegal, Ireland
- Died: 24 February 1816 (aged 81) Kingston, Nova Scotia

Charles Inglis (1734 – 24 February 1816) was an Irish Anglican clergyman and ardent Tory who was consecrated the first Anglican bishop in North America for the Diocese of Nova Scotia. He died at Kingston, Nova Scotia. He is buried in the crypt of St. Paul's Church (Halifax).

== Early and family life ==
Coat of Arms of Charles Inglis

He was born in 1734, the youngest of three sons of the Reverend Archibald Inglis, the rector of Glencolmcille and Kilcar, a remote parish in southwest County Donegal, on the west coast of the Irish province of Ulster. He was subsequently orphaned at the age of 11. He married Mary Vining in 1764, connecting him to one of the most powerful families in Delaware. She died in childbirth shortly afterwards. He married for the second time on May 31, 1773, Margaret Crooke; they had two sons and two daughters. His son, John, became the third bishop of Nova Scotia in 1825.

== Ministry and involvement in the American Revolution ==
Inglis became rector of Killybegs, Donegal, but in 1755 he sailed to America and worked as a teacher under the auspices of the Society for the Propagation of the Gospel in Foreign Parts. In 1758 the Bishop of London ordained him as a priest. Inglis spent several years in Delaware before moving to Trinity Church in New York in 1765, where his oldest child Charles is buried.

In 1776, in response to Thomas Paine's Common Sense, Inglis wrote a treatise, The True Interest of America Impartially Stated.

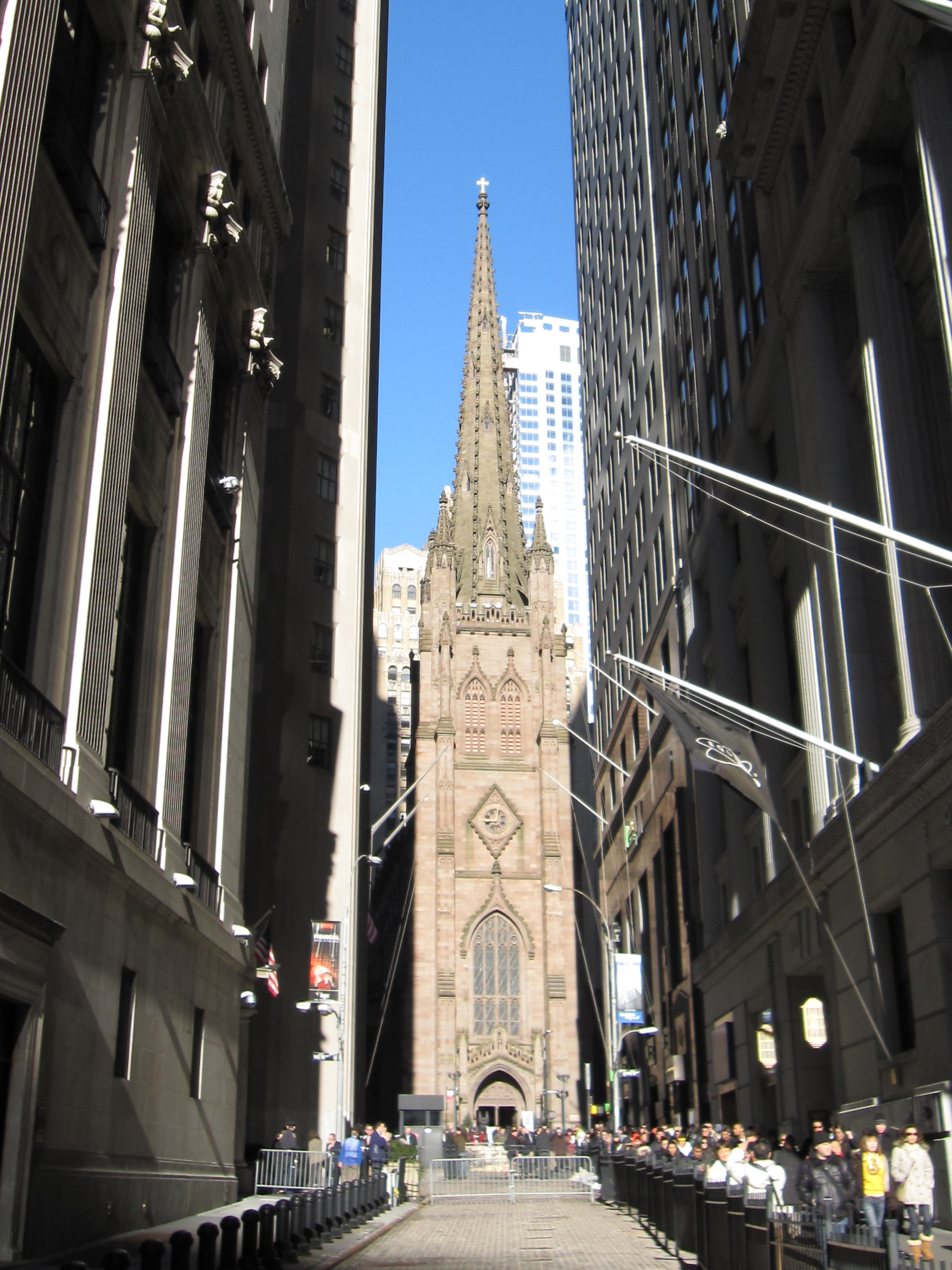
Trinity Church, New York

Following the British occupation of New York in 1777, Inglis was promoted from curate to rector of Trinity Church. As a Loyalist, it is recorded that Inglis prayed aloud for King George III while George Washington was in the congregation. The church was quickly surrounded by militia. Inglis' home was plundered. In November 1783, upon the evacuation of Loyalists from New York, Inglis returned to England. The new rector (1784) of Trinity Church was Samuel Provoost, the first Episcopal Bishop of New York (1787).

On 11 August 1787, George III created the Diocese of Nova Scotia by Letters Patent, and named Inglis its first bishop. He preached at St. Paul's Church (Halifax). The independence of the thirteen colonies which would form the United States had led to the creation of a new, autonomous, Anglican church there, with Samuel Seabury as the first bishop, but Inglis was the first Church of England bishop in North America, though technically his Episcopal see was "the Province of Nova Scotia".

Eager to increase the status of Anglicanism in the colonies, Inglis, supported the 1789 foundation of King's College (now the University of King's College) in Windsor, Nova Scotia, as an exclusive academy for sons of the Anglican elite. In 1783, when the outcome of the American Revolution was obvious, Inglis, along with other Nova Scotian elites, wrote to the colonial government in Nova Scotia to petition for the establishment of a college,

The founding of a College or Seminary of learning on a liberal plan in that province where youth may receive a virtuous education and can be qualified for the learned professions, is a measure of the greatest consequence, as it would diffuse religious literature, loyalty and good morals among His Majesty's subjects there. If such a seminary is not established the inhabitants will have no means of educating their sons at home, but will be under the necessity of sending them to Great Britain or Ireland, which will be attended with an expense that few can bear, or else to some of the states of this continent, where they will soon imbibe principles that are unfavourable to the British tradition.

He also backed several missionary efforts to turn the majority of the population from their dissenting religious beliefs. These efforts were largely unsuccessful.

== Death and legacy ==
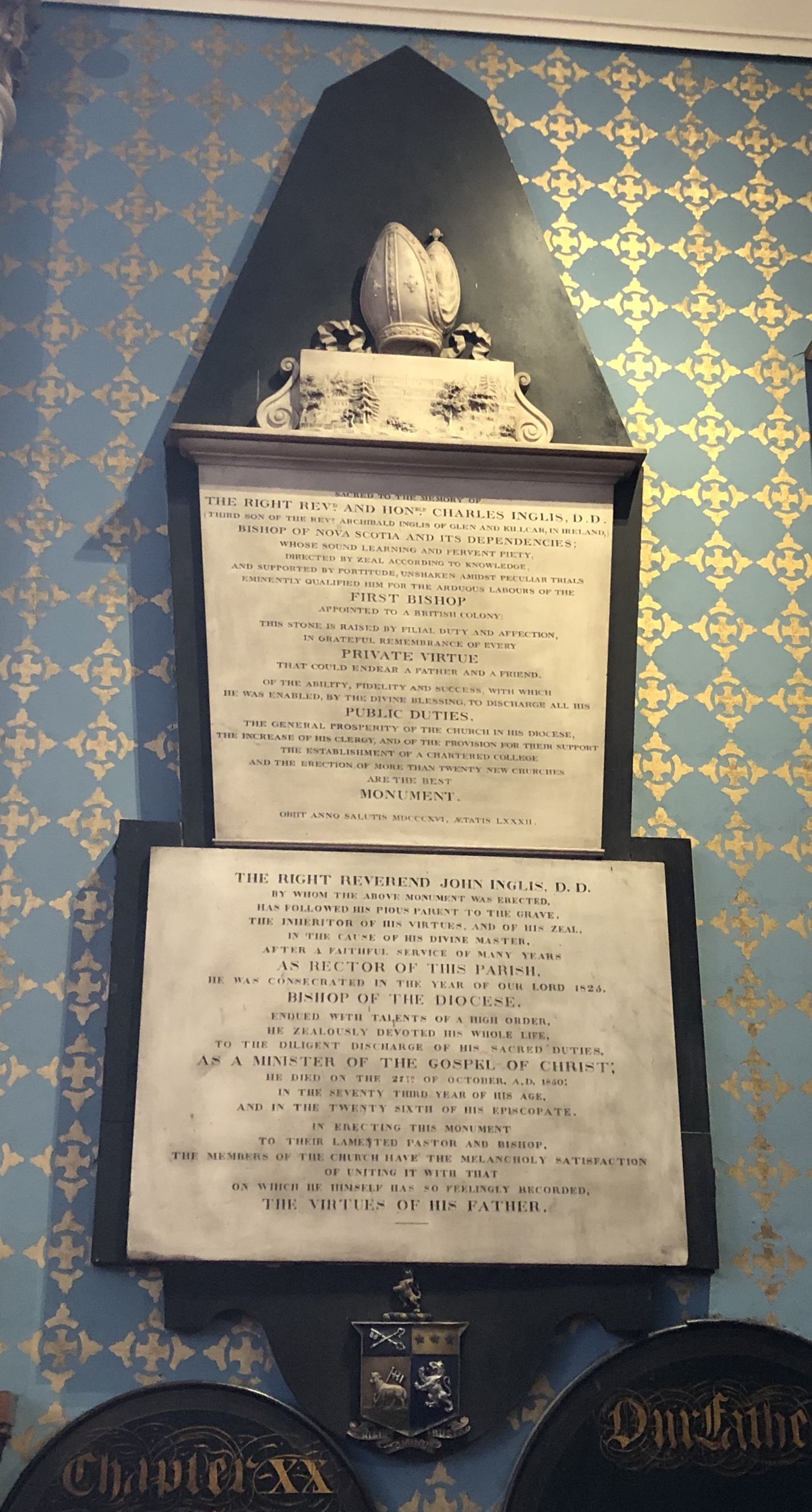
Charles and son John Inglis memorial, St. Paul's Church, Halifax, Nova Scotia

Bishop Inglis died on 24 February 1816 at Kingston, Nova Scotia. He is buried in the crypt of St. Paul's Church (Halifax).

There is a silver plaque in honour of Charles Inglis St Patrick's Cathedral, Dublin. He became a Doctor of Divinity.

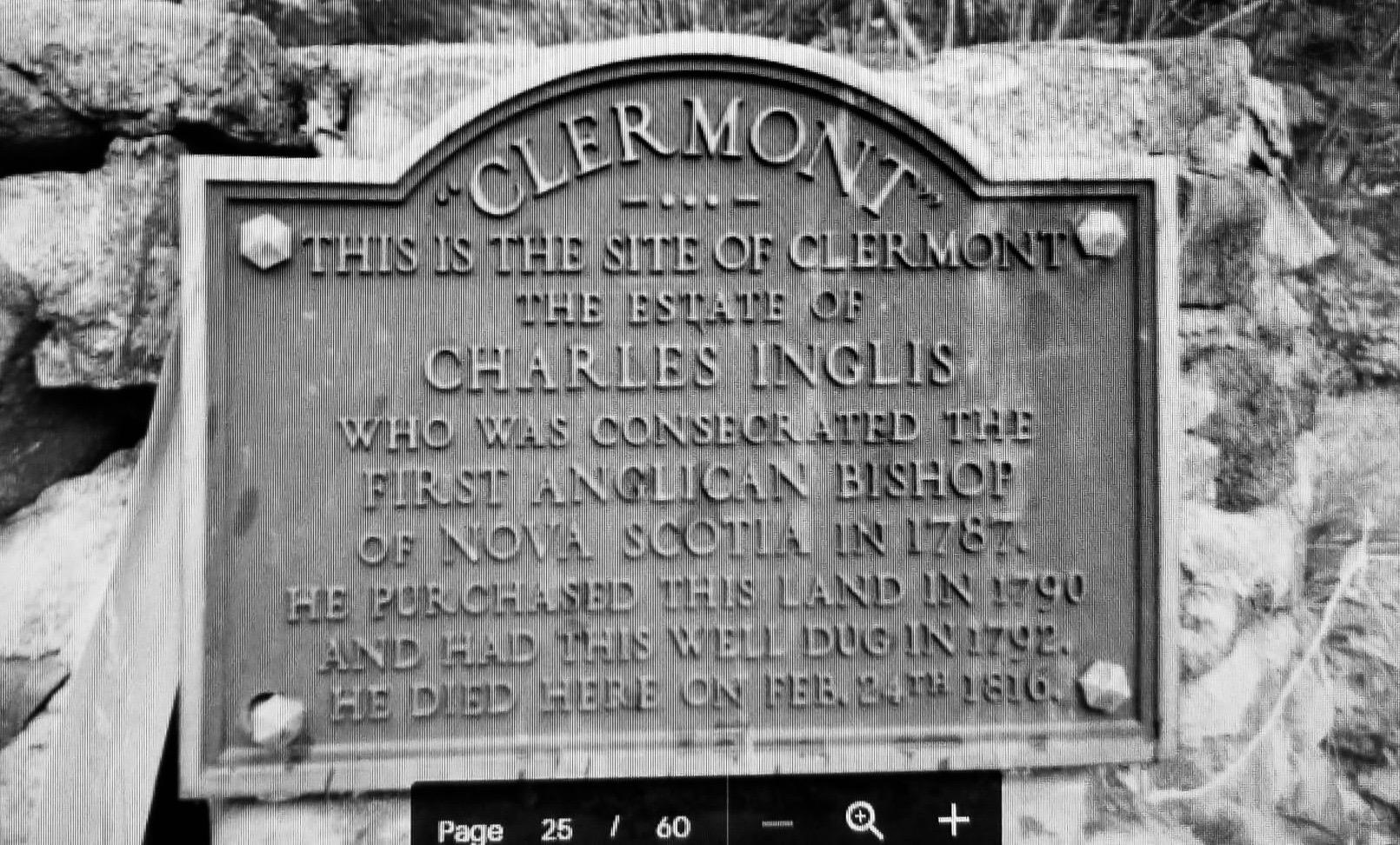
Charles Inglis Plaque, Kingston, Nova Scotia

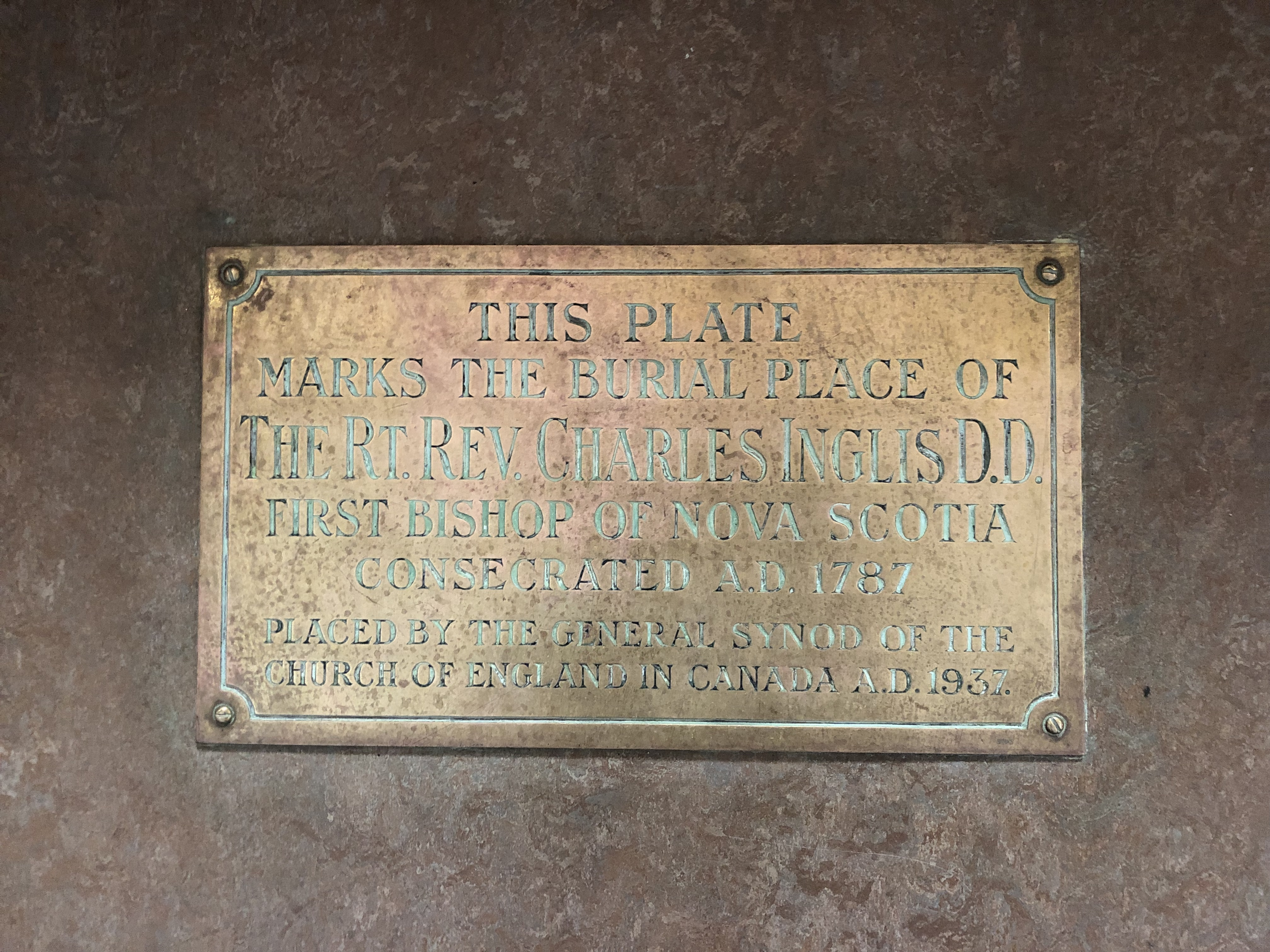
Charles Inglis Burial Marker, St. Paul's Church, Halifax, Nova Scotia

== Notes and references ==
- Carrington, Philip (1963). The Anglican Church in Canada. Toronto: Collins.
- Hawkins, Ernest (1845). Historical notices of the missions of the Church of England in the North American colonies. London: Society for the Propagation of the Gospel in Foreign Parts (Great Britain) – via B. Fellowes.
- Flick, Alexander Clarence (1901). Loyalism in New York during the American revolution. New York: The Columbia University Press.
- Hein, David; Shattuck, Gardiner H. Jr (2005). The Episcopalians. New York: Church Publishing, Inc. ISBN 978-0-89869-497-0.

Religious titles
| New diocese | Anglican Bishop of Nova Scotia; 1787–1816 | Succeeded by Robert Stanser |
