= 13th General Assembly of Nova Scotia =

The 13th General Assembly of Nova Scotia represented Nova Scotia between 1826 and 1830.

The assembly sat at the pleasure of the Governor of Nova Scotia, James Kempt. After Kempt was named Governor of British North America in 1828, Thomas N. Jeffrey became governor for Nova Scotia.

Samuel George William Archibald was chosen as speaker for the house.

== List of members ==
Electoral District	Name	First elected / previously elected
Town of Amherst	James Shannon Morse	1818
County of Annapolis	Thomas Chandler Haliburton (Note: named judge)	1826
County of Annapolis	John Johnston (1829)	1829
County of Annapolis	William Henry Roach	1818
Town of Annapolis	James R. Lovett	1826
Town of Barrington	John Homer	1826
County of Cape Breton	Richard John Uniacke, Jr.	1818
County of Cape Breton	Laurence Kavanagh	1818
Town of Cornwallis	John Morton	1826
County of Cumberland	Alexander Stewart	1826
County of Cumberland	Joseph Oxley	1826
Town of Digby	John Elkanah Morton	1826
Town of Falmouth	William Henry Shay	1826
Town of Granville	Timothy Ruggles	1818
County of Halifax	Samuel George William Archibald	1806
County of Halifax	William Lawson	1806
County of Halifax	George Smith	1819
County of Halifax	Lawrence Hartshorne	1825
Town of Halifax	Charles R. Fairbanks	1823
Town of Halifax	B. Murdoch	1826
County of Hants	Benjamin DeWolf	1824
County of Hants	John MacKay	1826
County of Hants	Richard Smith (1827)	1827
Town of Horton	James Harris, Jr.	1826
County of King's	John Starr (Note: died in 1827)	1826
County of King's	William Allen Chipman (1828)	1799, 1828
County of King's	Samuel Bishop	1820
Town of Liverpool	James Ratchford DeWolf	1820
Town of Londonderry	John Wier	1826
County of Lunenburg	Lot Church	1820
County of Lunenburg	William Rudolf	1826
Town of Lunenburg	John Heckman	1826
Town of Newport	Shubael Dimock	1793, 1826
Town of Onslow	John Crowe	1826
County of Queen's	Joseph Freeman	1811
County of Queen's	John Barss	1813, 1826
County of Shelburne	John McKinnon	1820
County of Shelburne	J.B. Moody (Note: died in 1828)	1826
County of Shelburne	John Forman (1829)	1829
Town of Shelburne	Nathaniel W. White	1826
Town of Shelburne	John Alexander Barry (1827) (Note: Nathaniel Whitworth White was originally returned; however, after an appeal, a review by a Select Committee in April 1827 found that many of the votes supporting White came from disqualified voters and Barry was declared elected)	1827
County of Sydney	John Young	1824
County of Sydney	Thomas Dickson	1818
Town of Truro	Charles Dickson Archibald	1826
Town of Windsor	David Dill	1826
Town of Yarmouth	Samuel Sheldon Poole	1785, 1804, 1813

== Notes ==
Preceded by 12th General Assembly of Nova Scotia	General Assemblies of Nova Scotia; 1826–1830	Succeeded by 14th General Assembly of Nova Scotia
