= 14th General Assembly of Nova Scotia =

The 14th General Assembly of Nova Scotia represented Nova Scotia between 1830 and 1836.

The assembly sat at the pleasure of the Governor of Nova Scotia, Peregrine Maitland. Colin Campbell succeeded Maitland as governor in 1834.

Samuel George William Archibald was chosen as speaker for the house.

== List of members ==
| Electoral District | Name | First elected / previously elected |
|---|---|---|
| Township of Amherst | James S. Morse | 1818 |
| Annapolis County | William H. Roach | 1818 |
| Annapolis County | John Johnston | 1829 |
| Township of Annapolis | James R. Lovett | 1826 |
| Township of Arichat (Note: new district in 1832) | Laurence O'Connor Doyle (1832) | 1832 |
| Township of Barrington | John Homer | 1826 |
| County of Cape Breton (Note: third seat added in 1832) | James Boyle Uniacke | 1818 |
| County of Cape Breton | Laurence Kavanagh | 1818 |
| County of Cape Breton | William Young (1832) (Note: election appealed) | 1832 |
| County of Cape Breton | Richard Smith (1833) | 1833 |
| Colchester County | Samuel G. W. Archibald | 1830 |
| Township of Cornwallis | John Morton | 1826 |
| Cumberland County | Alexander Stewart | 1826 |
| Cumberland County | Joseph Oxley | 1826 |
| Township of Digby | Charles Budd | 1830 |
| Township of Falmouth | William H. Shey | 1826 |
| Township of Granville | Timothy Ruggles (Note: died in 1831) | 1818 |
| Township of Granville | James Delap (1831) | 1831 |
| Halifax County | William Lawson | 1806 |
| Halifax County | Samuel G. W. Archibald | 1806 |
| Halifax County | George Smith | 1819 |
| Halifax County | Jotham Blanchard | 1830 |
| Township of Halifax | Charles Rufus Fairbanks | 1823 |
| Township of Halifax | Hugh Bell (1835) | 1835 |
| Township of Halifax | Stephen W. Deblois | 1830 |
| Hants County | William B. Bliss (Note: named to Supreme Court) | 1830 |
| Hants County | William O'Brien (1834) | 1834 |
| Hants County | Benjamin DeWolf | 1824 |
| Township of Horton | James Harris, Jr. | 1826 |
| Kings County | Samuel Chipman | 1830 |
| Kings County | Elisha DeWolf, Jr. | 1793, 1818, 1830 |
| Township of Liverpool | James Barss | 1799, 1830 |
| Township of Londonderry | John Wier | 1826 |
| Lunenburg County | William Rudolf | 1826 |
| Lunenburg County | John Creighton | 1830 |
| Township of Lunenburg | John Heckman | 1826 |
| Township of Newport | Felix Cochran | 1830 |
| Town of Onslow | Robert Dickson (Note: died in 1835) | 1818, 1830 |
| Town of Onslow | John Crowe (1835) | 1835 |
| Queens County | Joseph Freeman | 1811 |
| Queens County | James R. DeWolf | 1830 |
| Shelburne County | John Forman (Note: died in 1832) | 1829 |
| Shelburne County | Abraham Lent (1832) | 1832 |
| Shelburne County | Herbert Huntington | 1830 |
| Township of Shelburne | Charles Roche | 1830 |
| Sydney County | John Young | 1824 |
| Sydney County | Thomas Dickson | 1818 |
| Township of Sydney | Edmund Murray Dodd (1832) | 1832 |
| Town of Truro | Alexander L. Archibald | 1830 |
| Township of Windsor | David Dill (Note: declared lost at sea in 1833) | 1826 |
| Township of Windsor | Joseph Dill (1833) | 1833 |
| Township of Windsor | Lewis Morris Wilkins (1833) | 1833 |
| Township of Yarmouth | Reuben Clements | 1830 |
| Township of Yarmouth | Samuel S. Poole (1831) | 1785, 1804, 1813, 1831 |
| Township of Yarmouth | Reuben Clements (1835) | 1830, 1835 |

== Notes ==
| Preceded by 13th General Assembly of Nova Scotia | General Assemblies of Nova Scotia; 1830–1836 | Succeeded by 15th General Assembly of Nova Scotia |
