= John Payzant =

Foreign Protestant New Light Congregational minister

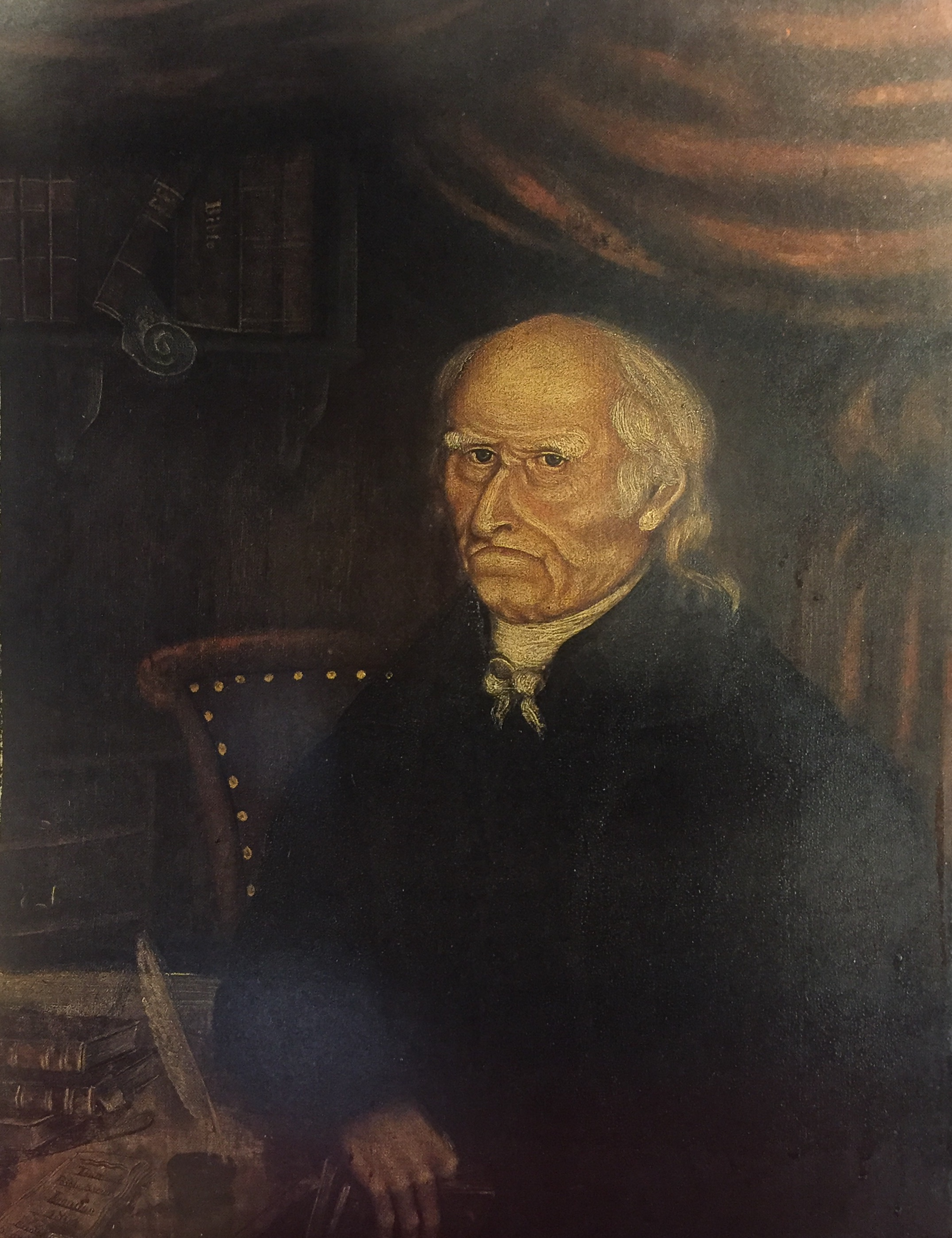
John Payzant (1749–1834) - taken captive for four years (age 6-10)

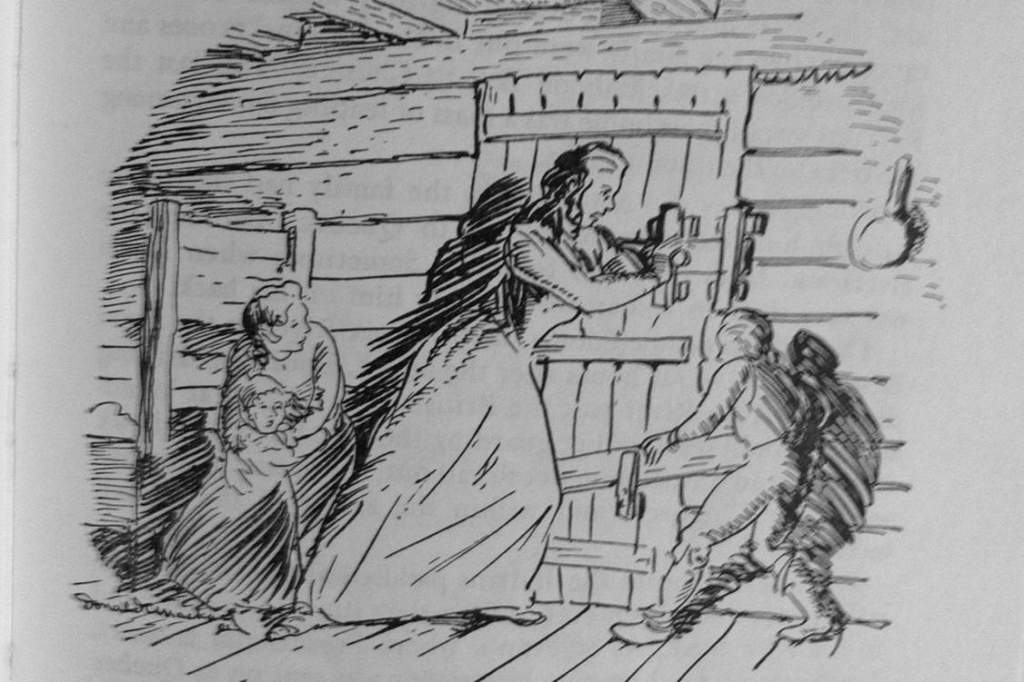
Raid on Lunenburg (1756): John and family defending against the attack by Donald A. Mackay

John Payzant (17 Oct. 1749 in Jersey – 10 April 1834 in Liverpool, Nova Scotia) was a Foreign Protestant, prominent New Light Congregational minister in Liverpool, Nova Scotia and was taken captive for four years with his siblings and pregnant mother after the Raid on Lunenburg (1756).

He was born Jean Paysant in St. Helier, Jersey, Channel Islands to French Huguenots Louis Payzant (1695–1756) and his wife Marie Anne Noget (1711–1796). The family moved to Lunenburg, Nova Scotia, in 1753. At the May 1756 raid, mercenary natives for the French shot and scalped his father and three others. According to DesBrisay, they were later buried on Heckman's Island, Nova Scotia.

For the first year, he and his siblings were adopted by the Indigenous family while his pregnant mother was taken to Quebec. John learned to speak their native language. He later wrote: “I was [later] a languattor [translator] for the Indians as I had learnt that Language when prisoner among them." After one year of captivity by the natives, he and his siblings were eventually released to re-connect with their mother in Quebec. “When I arrived at Quebec I was sent to the Jesuits to be instructed in the Learning of that Academy and during my stay there I made great proficiency in the Arts that were taught in that School, and as they were fond to proselyte they took the more pains with me."

In 1760 they all (including a sister born in Quebec in December 1756) returned to Nova Scotia, settling in Falmouth. Payzant then became a minister in Liverpool, Nova Scotia (1793). He was part of the Great Awakening and was a follower of Henry Alline and married his sister Mary in 1774. They had one daughter and eight sons. Rev. John Payzant died at 84 in 1834.

== See also ==
- Captivity Narratives - Nova Scotia
