= Oxley (surname) =

Origin
- Meaning: The oxen clearing. Inhabitants of Oxley, Staffordshire or Oxley near Hepworth, West Yorkshire
- Region of origin: England, south-east Scotland (Plurality in Yorkshire, Durham, Tyne and Wear, Cumbria, Northumberland, and the Scottish Borders) “

Other names
- Variant form: Exley

Oxley is an English surname, originating in Yorkshire, Durham, Northumberland, Tyne and Wear, and Staffordshire. Notable people with the surname include:

- Adam Oxley (born 1992), Australian rules footballer
- Alan Oxley, Australian diplomat
- Albert Oxley (1915–1994), English footballer
- Bernard Oxley (1907–1975), English footballer
- Bill Oxley (1918–1985), English professional rugby league footballer
- Billy Oxley (1899–1951), English footballer
- Cyril Oxley (1905–1984), English footballer
- Dana Oxley (born 1967), American judge
- David Oxley (1920–1985), English actor
- Deborah Oxley, Australian historian
- Dennie Oxley (born 1970), American politician
- Dinah Oxley (1948–2020), English golfer
- George Oxley (died 1820), political figure in colonial Nova Scotia
- Harrison Oxley (1933–2009), English organist
- Henry Oxley (1858–1945), Canadian-born Major League baseball player
- Henry Oxley (politician) (1826–1867), Australian politician
- James Oxley (born 1961), Australian–American mathematician
- James Macdonald Oxley (1855–1907), Canadian lawyer and an author of books for boys
- Jennifer Oxley, American writer and television director
- Jeremy Oxley, Australian musician, guitarist for 1980s band the Sunnyboys
- John Oxley (disambiguation), several people
- Joseph Oxley (c. 1779–1868), political figure in colonial Nova Scotia
- Joseph W. Oxley (born 1958), American politician
- Lawrence A. Oxley (1887–1973), American community leader appointed to Roosevelt's "Black Cabinet"
- Melanie Oxley, Australian musician and songwriter
- Mark Oxley (born 1990), English footballer
- Mike Oxley (1944–2016), American politician
- Paul Oxley, English songwriter living in Finland
- Peter Oxley, Australian musician, bass player for The Sunnyboys
- Philip Oxley (born 1965), English cricketer
- Rob Oxley, British political consultant
- Roslyn Oxley, Australian art dealer
- Roy Oxley (1905–1980), British television set designer
- Scott Oxley (born 1976), English professional footballer
- Simon Oxley (1969–2026), British graphic designer
- Tanya Oxley (born 1979), Barbadian track and field sprinter
- Thomas Oxley (1805–1886), Straits Settlements administrator
- Tony Oxley (1938–2023), British jazz drummer
- Tony Oxley (boxer) (1942–2015), English boxer
- W. Oxley (Essex cricketer), eighteenth century English cricketer
- Walter Oxley (1891–1978), British Army general
- Will Oxley (born 1965), Australian sport sailor
- William Oxley (1939–2020), English poet

== See also ==
- Rice-Oxley, a surname
