= John Morton =

John Morton may refer to:

== Arts ==
- John Morton (actor) (born 1947), American movie actor and stuntman
- John Morton (composer) (born 1954), American composer
- John Morton (trade unionist) (1925–2021), British trade unionist and musician
- John Morton (writer), 1990s British writer and director on BBC
- John D Morton (born 1953), American musician and visual artist
- John Maddison Morton (1811–1891), English playwright
- J. B. Morton (1893–1979), British humorist and columnist known as Beachcomber

== Politics ==
- John Morton (MP for Newcastle-upon-Tyne), English politician and merchant, MP for Newcastle-upon-Tyne in 1393 and 1395
- John Morton (MP for York), English member of parliament (MP) for City of York
- Sir John Morton, 2nd Baronet (c. 1627–1699), English MP for Poole and Weymouth and Melcombe Regis
- John Morton (American politician) (1725–1777), American surveyor, signed Declaration of Independence for Pennsylvania
- John Morton (cardinal) (c. 1420–1500), Archbishop of Canterbury and Lord Chancellor of England
- John Morton (MP, died 1780) (c. 1716–1780), English Tory MP for Abingdon, for New Romney and for Wigan
- John Morton (Nova Scotia politician) (1781–1858), Canadian businessman and politician in Nova Scotia
- John Elkanah Morton (1793–1835), Canadian political figure in Nova Scotia
- John T. Morton (born 1966), American director of U.S. Immigration and Customs Enforcement
- John W. Morton (Tennessee politician) (1842–1914), American Confederate veteran, farmer and politician

== Sports ==
- Jack Morton (John Joseph Morton, 1922–1983), American football player and coach in the National Football League
- Jackie Morton (John Morton, 1914–1986), English footballer in the English Football League
- John Morton (American football) (born 1969), American football coach in the National Football League
- John Morton (basketball) (born 1967), American professional basketball player for the NBA Cleveland Cavaliers
- John Morton (cricketer) (1895–1966), English cricketer
- John Morton (racing driver) (born 1942), American racing driver
- John Morton (skier) (born 1946), American Olympic skier
- John W. Morton (runner) (1879–1950), British athlete who competed at the 1908 Olympic Games
- Johnnie Morton (born 1971), American professional football player in the National Football League

== Other ==
- John Morton (cognitive scientist) (born 1933), English neuroscientist
- John Morton (naturalist) (1671–1726), English cleric and naturalist
- John Morton (Anglican priest) (died 1722), English Anglican priest
- John Morton (zoologist) (1924–2011), New Zealand biologist and theologian
- John Chalmers Morton (1821–1888), British agriculturist and writer
- John Percival Morton (1911–1985), English assistant undersecretary of state at the Ministry of Defence

== See also ==
- John Murton (disambiguation)
