= Heckmans Island =

Community in Nova Scotia, Canada

Coordinates: 44°22′56.63″N 64°14′49.42″W

Heckmans Island is a community in the Canadian province of Nova Scotia, located in Lunenburg County. After Mi'kmaq fighters killed John Payzant's father and brother in the Raid on Lunenburg (1756), they were buried on Heckman's Island.
