= Leprince-Ringuet =

Leprince-Ringuet is a surname. Notable people with the surname include:

- Grégoire Leprince-Ringuet (born 1987), French actor
- Louis Leprince-Ringuet (1901–2000), French physicist

== See also ==
- Leprince
- Oxley (surname)
