= 13th Nova Scotia general election =

13th Nova Scotia general election may refer to:

- Nova Scotia general election, 1826, the 13th general election to take place in the Colony of Nova Scotia, for the 13th General Assembly of Nova Scotia
- 1916 Nova Scotia general election, the 35th overall general election for Nova Scotia, for the (due to a counting error in 1859) 36th Legislative Assembly of Nova Scotia, but considered the 13th general election for the Canadian province of Nova Scotia
