= Elizabeth Mixer =

American religious autobiographer

- Born: Ashford, Massachusetts
- Known for: Religious autobiographer; Religious writer
- Notable work: An Account of Some Spiritual Experiences and Raptures

Elizabeth Mixer was an American religious autobiographer active in the 18th century. A gathering of her writing published in 1736, An Account of Some Spiritual Experiences and Raptures, documents her own conversion and is associated with the Great Awakening.

== Biography ==
Mixer was born in Ashford, Massachusetts around 1707. She was the daughter of a deacon and was given a religious education by her parents. Mixer was received with communion into the Ashford congregation in November 1720 following her experience of religious visions and the near-death of her sister Rebecca.

Mixer's collection of writing, An Account of Some Spiritual Experiences and Raptures (published 1736), can be described as a Puritan conversion autobiography. The content was written whilst Mixer was soul-searching ahead of her entrance into the Ashford Church. An Account is a collection of Mixer's sayings, visions, and advice was compiled by Rev. James Hale. In the preface, he explains that he gathered together Mixer's works hoping they would give credibility to the revivalism of the Great Awakening. An Account records Mixer's conversion. She describes her religious upbringing and writes that she was awakened to the secret duty of prayer between the ages of six and seven. She depicts three visions which she experienced during an illness in 1720, aged around 13 years old: Christ in the Heavenly City, Christ coming to her at night, and the Last Judgment. Mixer writes about her encounters with Satan and reveals the passages of scripture which helped her overcome temptation. Her writing, in particular the descriptions of her visions, are hyperbolic, dramatic, and elaborate, demonstrating a move away from the more Puritan struggle for salvation.
