= Raid on Lunenburg, Nova Scotia =

Raid on Lunenburg, Nova Scotia may refer to:

- Raid on Lunenburg, Nova Scotia (1782)
- Raid on Lunenburg, Nova Scotia (1756)
