= Robert Brackenbury =

15th-century English noble

Sir Robert Brackenbury (died 22 August 1485) was an English courtier, who was Constable of the Tower of London during the reign of Richard III. He was alleged in a document attributed to Sir Thomas More (it was found among More's personal effects after he died, but may have originated from his mentor John Morton) to have been responsible for enabling the (presumed) murders of the Princes in the Tower, though there is no conclusive evidence to prove it. He died fighting for King Richard III at the Battle of Bosworth Field in 1485.

== Early life ==
His date of birth is unknown. He was a younger son of Thomas Brackenbury of Denton, County Durham, England. This was a family which had been known in Durham since the end of the 12th century. They were lords of the manors of Burne Hall, Denton and Saleby. Robert inherited Saleby; in the immediate vicinity of Barnard Castle. Barnard Castle had passed to the Duke of Gloucester (later Richard III) in the right of his wife, Anne Neville in about 1474. Richard III and Brackenbury, were therefore, close neighbours. Indeed, a tower of Barnard Castle is still called Brackenbury Tower.

== Royal service ==
Brackenbury was one of Richard III's close associates. He was treasurer of Richard's household when he was Duke of Gloucester. When King Edward IV died Brackenbury was almost certainly one of the Northerners who accompanied Richard to London. Shortly after Richard took the throne Brackenbury received a number of appointments, including Constable of the Tower of London. After the collapse of the Buckingham Revolt he was rewarded with large grants of land in the south-east of England forfeited by Rivers and the Cheney family and in 1484 was appointed sheriff of Kent.

Brackenbury remained Constable of the Tower and on 17 July 1483 he was appointed Constable of the Tower for life. He was also given the very lucrative post of Master of the King's Moneys and Keeper of the Exchange, that is, Master of the Mint after the execution of William Hastings, 1st Baron Hastings, the previous incumbent. Many other honours and duties were laid on him. In March 1485 he was entrusted with Richard's bastard son, John of Gloucester, whom he took to Calais to become its captain. In May he was placed in command of the defence of London. His income must have exceeded £500 per year – more than many Barons. He must have been better rewarded than all but three or four of the household. Between August 1484 and January 1485 he was knighted.

Brackenbury seems to have been a man of popularity and wide learning. The Italian poet Pietro Carmeliano, dedicated one of his Latin works to him.

== Brackenbury and the Princes in the Tower ==
As Constable of the Tower of London, Brackenbury inevitably figures in any account of the fate of Richard III's nephews, the Princes in the Tower.

For example, in Thomas More's version of the life of Richard III, More says that after the coronation on 6 July 1483 and while on his way to Gloucester, Richard sent John Green to Brackenbury with written orders for Brackenbury to kill the princes. Brackenbury, says More, replied "that he would never put them to death, though he should die therefore". So Richard then ordered Sir James Tyrrell to go to Brackenbury with a letter by which he was commanded to deliver to Sir James all the keys of the Tower for one night, "to the end he might there accomplish the King's pleasure".

More also stated that before his execution in 1502, Tyrrell confessed to the murders, but could no longer say where the bodies were, claiming Brackenbury had moved them.

== Tudor invasion and death ==
In 1485, when news arrived that Henry Tudor had landed in Wales he was ordered to escort Lords Hungerford and Bourchier to Leicester but en route they escaped.

When Richard III marched against the invader, Brackenbury hurried himself to reach the King and arrived two days before the Battle of Bosworth Field (22 August 1485), in which – according to Molinet and Lindsay – he had joint command of Richard's vanguard; he took part in the final charge on Henry and was killed by Sir Walter Hungerford of Farleigh fighting beside Richard III.

On 7 November 1485, Brackenbury was posthumously attainted by Henry VII. In a document antedating Henry Tudor's rule, Brackenbury was charged with having "assembled to them at Leicester ... a great host, traitorously intending, imagining and conspiring the destruction of the king's royal person, our sovereign liege lord".

Brackenbury's attainder was partly reversed in 1489 in favour of his sisters and bastard son, allowing them to recover the family lands but not the new grants from Richard III. Ralph, his nephew and heir male inherited Saleby.

== Sources ==
- Bennett, Michael, The Battle of Bosworth. St. Martin's Press, 1985
- Bunnett, R.J.A.; "Sir Robert Brackenbury", Various Papers, RIII Society Victoria Branch Inc.
- Green, R.F.; "Historical notes of a London citizen, 1483–1488"
- Horrox, Rosemary; Richard III: A Study in Service Cambridge University Press, 1989
- Kendall, Paul Murray; Richard III, Unwin Paperbacks, London, 1973
- Lander, J.R.; The Wars of the Roses, Alan Sutton, London, 1990
- Leadam, I. S. (1901). "Brackenbury, Robert". In Lee, Sidney (ed.). Dictionary of National Biography (1st supplement). Vol. 1. London: Smith, Elder & Co. pp. 247–248.
- Ross, Charles; Richard III, Methuen, London, 1981 (1988 edition)

== See also ==
- The White Queen (miniseries), episode 9
