= John Weir =

John Weir may refer to:

- John Alexander Weir (1894–1942), Canadian lawyer and professor
- John Angus Weir (1930–2007), fourth president of Wilfrid Laurier University
- John Ferguson Weir (1841–1926), American painter and sculptor
- John Jenner Weir (1822–1894), English amateur entomologist, ornithologist and British civil servant
- John Weir (loyalist) (born 1950), Ulster loyalist
- Johnny Weir (born 1984), American figure skater
- John Weir (footballer), Scottish footballer
- John Weir (writer) (born 1959), American writer
- John Weir (geologist) (1896–1978), Scottish geologist and palaeontologist
- John Weir (physician) (1879–1971), Physician Royal to several British monarchs
- John Weir (politician) (1904–1995), Australian politician
- John Weir (trade unionist) (1851–1908), Scottish trade unionist

== See also ==
- John Wier (disambiguation)
