= Robert Barry (merchant) =

Robert Barry (c. 1759 – 3 September 1843) was a teacher and merchant, among other pursuits, who became an important figure in Nova Scotia.

Barry was born in Scotland, raised in England and came to North America as an impressed sailor who escaped his ship in New York in about 1774. Little is known about his life there other than he was in a business partnership, he was a participant in Methodist services at the John Street Chapel and formed a friendship with the Reverend Charles Inglis, the rector of Trinity Church where he was a regular communicant.

In 1783, Barry was part of a large group of loyalists, including many Methodists, who left New York and ended up in Nova Scotia. In Shelburne he taught school and then became involved in a very successful partnership with his brother in Liverpool. They were involved in West Indies fish, lumber, sugar, and rum trade, as well as agricultural produce. British dry goods were imported for sale in Nova Scotia and stores were operated in many locations. They serviced these with a small fleet of vessels in which they had a substantial interest.

Barry had four sons, all of whom were successful in business in the colony. His one son, John Alexander Barry married a daughter of William Black, a prominent Methodist minister and was elected to the 13th General Assembly of Nova Scotia. Robert's Methodism contributed to the family's success by providing close business ties within the colony. His life is a good example of the importance that evangelical Protestantism had in that area of Canada.
