= John Wier =

John Wier may refer to:

- John Wier (politician) (died 1861), Nova Scotia judge and politician
- Johann Weyer (1515–1588), Dutch physician, occultist, and demonologist

== See also ==
- John Weir (disambiguation)
