= 14th Nova Scotia general election =

14th Nova Scotia general election may refer to:

- Nova Scotia general election, 1830, the 14th general election to take place in the Colony of Nova Scotia, for the 14th General Assembly of Nova Scotia
- 1920 Nova Scotia general election, the 36th overall general election for Nova Scotia, for the (due to a counting error in 1859) 37th Legislative Assembly of Nova Scotia, but considered the 14th general election for the Canadian province of Nova Scotia
