= Leprince =

Leprince is a French surname. 'le prince' means 'the prince'. Notable people with the surname include:

- René Leprince (1876–1929), French silent film director
- Xavier Leprince (1799–1826), French painter, drawer, and engraver

== See also ==
- Leprince-Ringuet
- Jeanne-Marie Leprince de Beaumont
