= John Oxley (disambiguation) =

John Oxley (1784–1828) was an explorer and surveyor of Australia.

John Oxley may also refer to:

== People ==
- John Norton Oxley (1824–1891), Australian farmer and politician
- John Oxley (long jumper) (1881–1925), American track and field athlete
- John T. Oxley (polo) (1909–1996), American businessman and polo player
- John C. Oxley (born 1937), American oilman, horse breeder and polo player
- John Oxley (cricketer) (1850–1917), English cricketer
- Johnny Oxley (1922-1976), British ice hockey player

== Other ==
- SS John Oxley, pilot boat, built 1927
