= Raid on Lunenburg, Nova Scotia (1756) =

Raid in Nova Scotia during the Seven Years' War

Coordinates: 44°22′37″N 64°19′8″W

Raid on Lunenburg
- Part of the French and Indian War
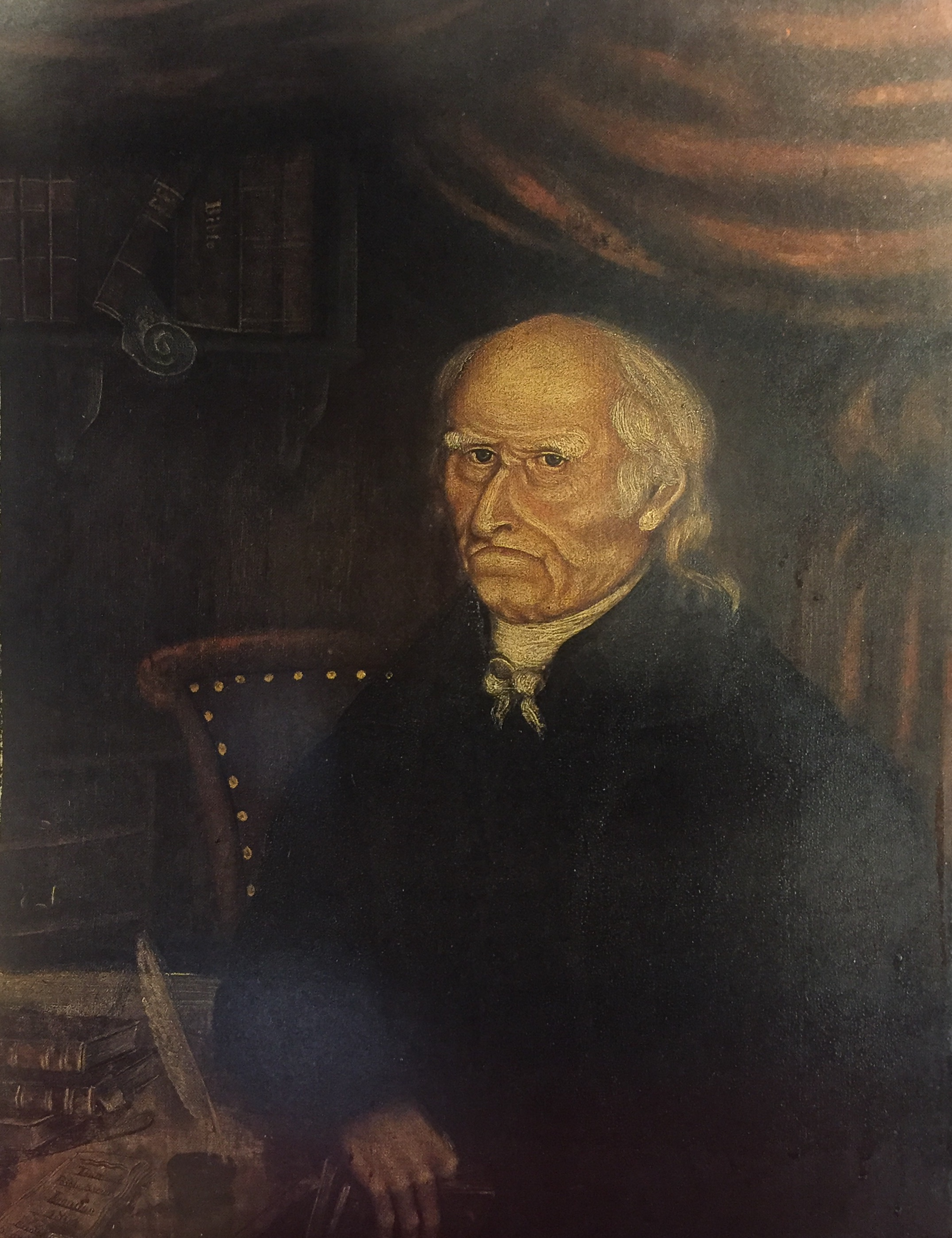
- John Payzant (1749-1834)- taken captive for four years (age 6-10), Perkins House Museum
| Date | May 8, 1756 |
| Location | Lunenburg, Nova Scotia |
| Result | French, Acadian, Wabanaki Confederacy (Mi'kmaq and Maliseet) victory |

Belligerents
| (United Kingdom) Great Britain | (Kingdom of France) France; Wabanaki Confederacy (Mi'kmaq and Maliseet) |

Commanders and leaders
| Lieut-Colonel Patrick Sutherland, Dettlieb Christopher Jessen | Charles Deschamps de Boishebert |

Strength
| 30 | Unknown |

Casualties and losses
| 5 killed, 5 prisoners | None |

The Raid on Lunenburg occurred during the French and Indian War when Indigenous forces attacked a British settlement at Lunenburg, Nova Scotia on May 8, 1756. The indigenous forces raided two islands on the northern outskirts of the fortified Township of Lunenburg, Rous Island and Payzant Island (present-day Covey Island). The raiding party killed five settlers and took five prisoners. This raid was the first of nine that the Indigenous and Acadian forces conducted against the Lunenburg peninsula over the next three years of the war. The Indigenous forces took John Payzant and Lewis Payzant prisoner, both of whom left captivity narratives of their experiences.

== Historical context ==
The first recorded Indigenous forces attack in the region happened during King George's War on the La Have river. The forces killed seven English crew members on a vessel that went ashore. The scalps were taken to Joseph Marin de la Malgue at Louisbourg.

Father Le Loutre's War began when Edward Cornwallis arrived to establish Halifax with 13 transports on June 21, 1749. The British quickly began to build other settlements. To guard against Indigenous, Acadian and French attacks on the new Protestant settlements, British fortifications were erected in Halifax (Citadel Hill) (1749), Bedford (Fort Sackville) (1749), Dartmouth (1750), Lunenburg (1753) and Lawrencetown (1754).

To thwart the development of these Protestant settlements, the Native and Acadian forces conducted numerous raids on the settlements, such as the raid on Dartmouth. When the French and Indian War began, the conflict in Acadia intensified. With the British victory at the Battle of Fort Beauséjour (1755), the Expulsion of the Acadians from the Maritimes began and conflict between the Nova Scotia government and the Native and Acadian forces continued. Fort Cumberland was raided for two days between April 26–27, 1756, and nine British soldiers were killed and scalped. Almost two weeks later, the Native forces attacked the outskirts of Lunenburg.

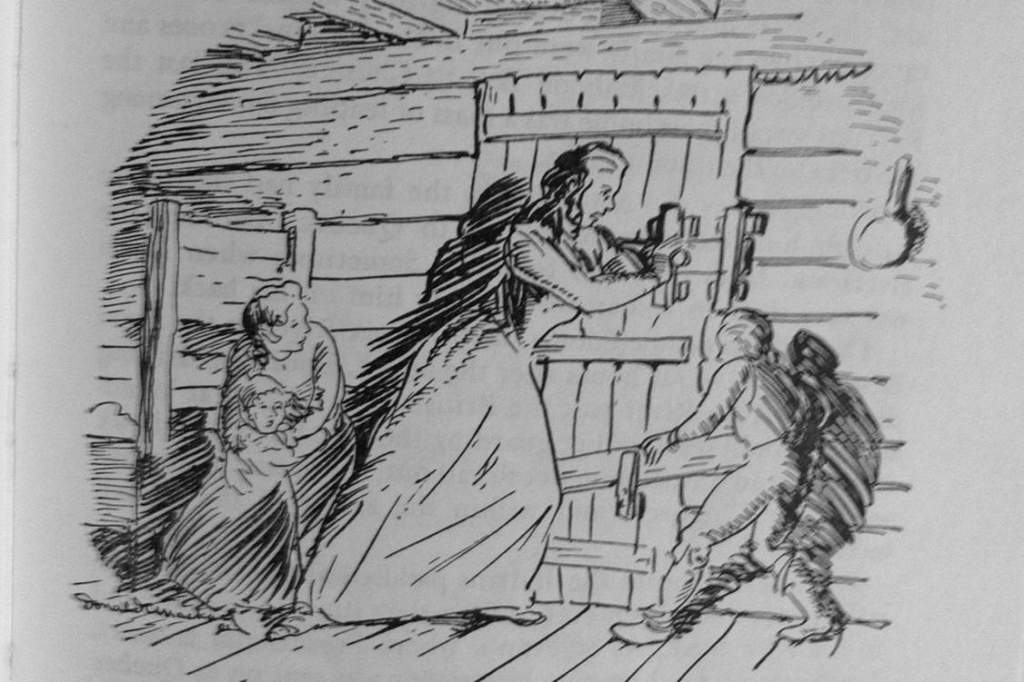
Raid on Lunenburg (1756): Marie Anne Payzant and her children by Donald A. Mackay

== Raid on Lunenburg ==
The Governor General of New France, Pierre François de Rigaud, ordered the top military figure in Acadia Charles Deschamps de Boishébert et de Raffetot to send a raiding party to Lunenburg. On May 8, 1756, the Indigenous forces arrived at Rous Island where they attacked three people. The raiding party killed a grandfather and his adult son and captured the grandson. They tied the boy’s hands and forced him to guide them to Payzant Island.

The Indigenous forces arrived at the island and attacked Louis Payzant. His wife Marie rushed out of the house, threw her arms around her fainting husband and begged him to go inside. He died in her arms, stating,"My heart is growing cold — the Indians."

Marie immediately retreated into the safety of their home, frantically barricading the door. However, the native forces were not deterred, and they soon began burning the house down with the family still inside. Trapped and with no viable escape, Marie instructed her eldest son Philip, nine years old, to open the door and confront the attackers. The boy took a defiant stand, even though it was clear he stood little chance against such a formidable enemy.

Amidst the chaos, the indigenous forces killed and scalped a servant-woman and her infant child. They also killed and scalped the young boy from Rous Island, who had been coerced into guiding them to the Island. The raiding party captured Marie, who was one month pregnant, and her four children and transported them via the Saint John River to Quebec City.

Lieut-Colonel Patrick Sutherland, who was stationed at Lunenburg, immediately dispatched a company of 30 officers and soldiers to repel the raid. Upon their return on May 11, Deputy provost marshal Dettlieb Christopher Jessen reported the number killed was five and that the native forces and the prisoners were gone.

== Consequences ==
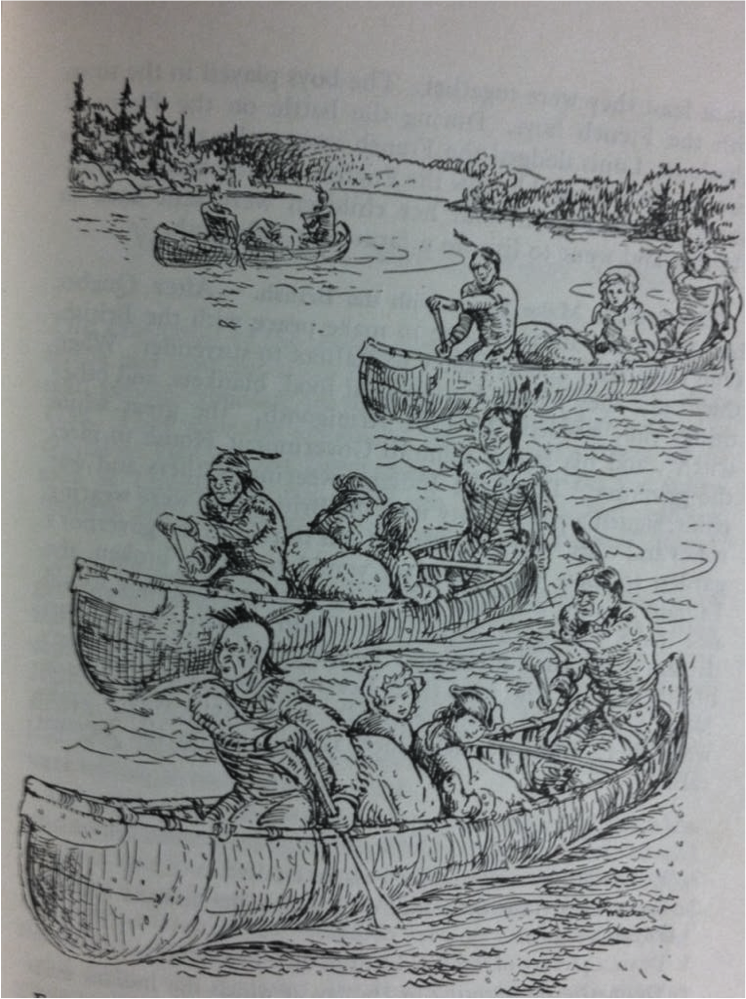
Marie Anne Payzant pregnant with "Lisette" (far right), her son John, and the rest of her children taken captive by Donald A. Mackay

In response to the Lunenburg raid and the earlier raids on Fort Cumberland, on May 14, 1756, Governor Charles Lawrence created a bounty for the scalps of Mi'kmaq and Maliseet men and prisoners. Governor Lawrence also sought to protect the area by establishing blockhouses at the LaHave River, Mush-a-Mush (at present day Blockhouse, Nova Scotia) and at the Northwest Range (present day Northwest, Nova Scotia).

Upon learning that the victims were French (albeit Protestant French), on August 6, 1756, the Governor of New France considered the possibility of recruiting other French settlers at Lunenburg to burn the town and join the French occupied territories of Île St. Jean (Prince Edward Island) or Île Royale (Cape Breton Island). While the burning of Lunenburg never took place, a number of the French and German-speaking Foreign Protestants left the village to join Acadian communities.

The Indigenous forces took Marie and her four young children to Quebec City. Along the way they stopped at the French garrison at Ste. Anne's Point, where Boishébert, who had ordered the raid, was stationed. The Maliseet kept Marie's children for ransom at their near-by village Aukpaque (present-day Springhill, New Brunswick and Eqpahak Island) and forced her to go to Quebec City without them. She gave birth while a prisoner of war on December 27, 1756 to Louise Catherine, later nicknamed Lisette. The following summer, a ransom was paid and the rest of her children joined her in Quebec City. Marie and her children spent four years in captivity (1756–1760). They were released after the Battle of Quebec and settled in present-day Falmouth, Nova Scotia in 1761. Her daughter who was born in captivity eventually settled in Scots Bay, Nova Scotia, Canada where there is a memorial to her.

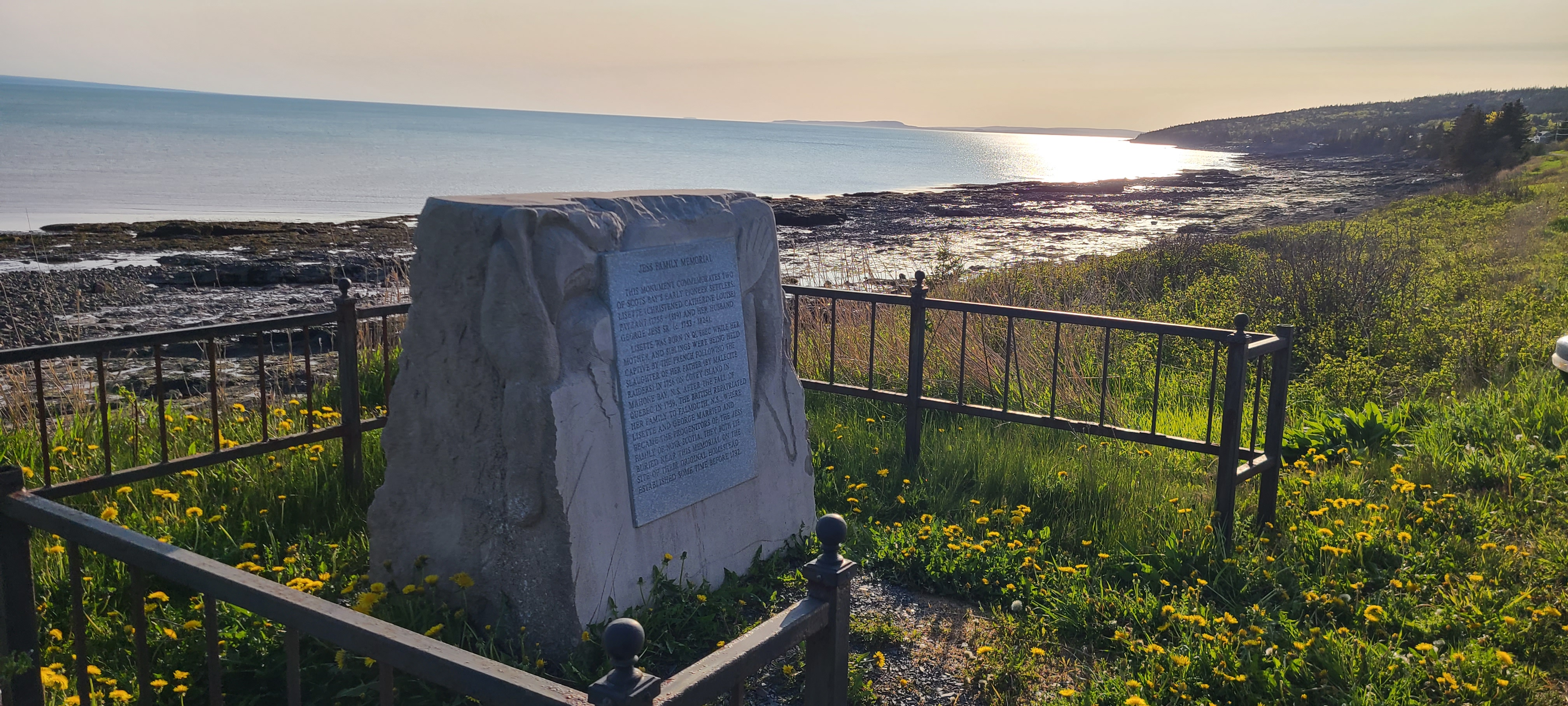
Jess Family Memorial in Scots Bay, Nova Scotia, Canada - includes the story of Marie Anne Payzant’s unborn baby at time of capture, Catherine Louise "Lisette" Payzant, later Jess (1756-1819)

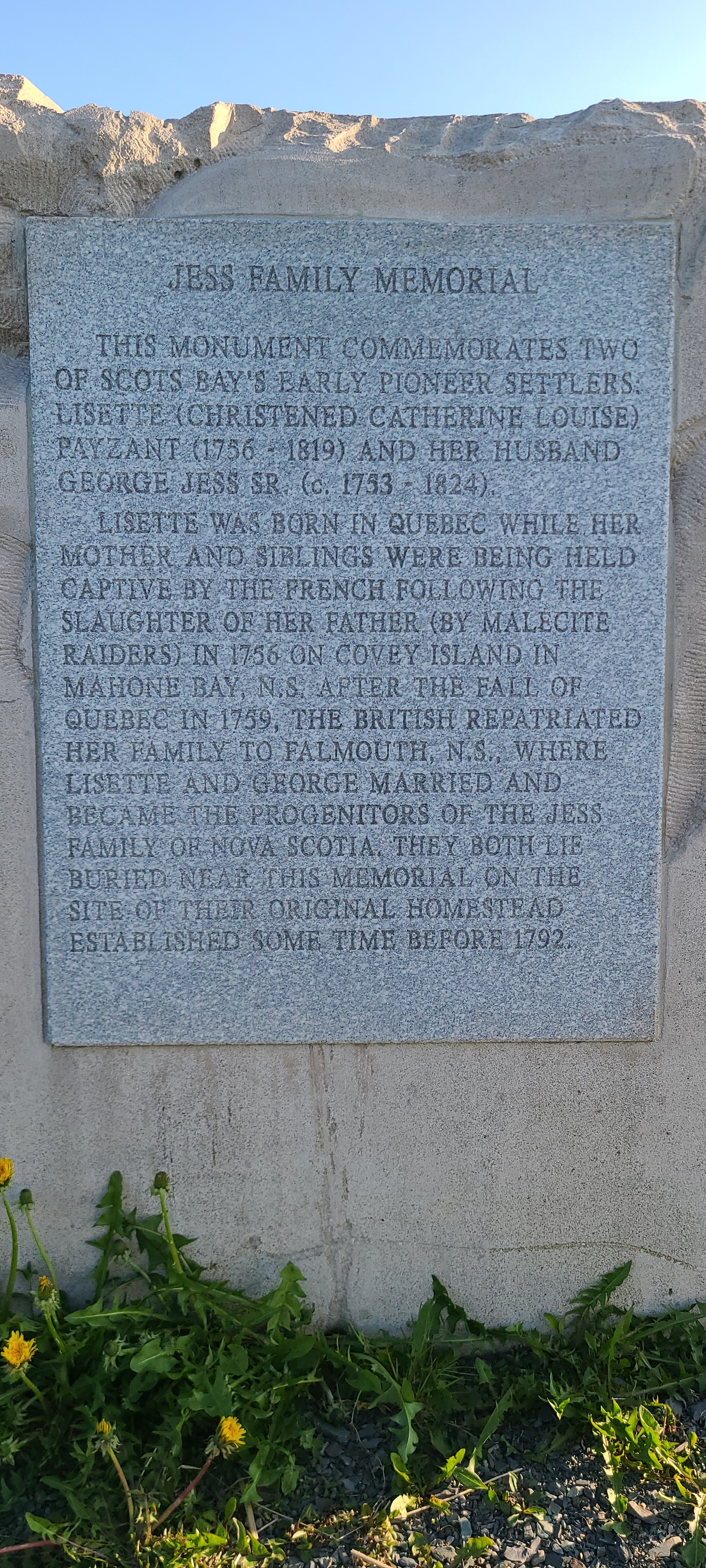
Jess Family Memorial, Scots Bay, Nova Scotia, Canada

In April 1757, a band of Acadian and Mi'kmaq partisans raided a warehouse near-by Fort Edward, killing thirteen British soldiers and, after taking what provisions they could carry, setting fire to the building. A few days later, the same partisans also raided Fort Cumberland. Because of the strength of the Acadian militia and Mi'kmaq militia, British officer John Knox wrote that "In the year 1757 we were said to be Masters of the province of Nova Scotia, or Acadia, which, however, was only an imaginary possession." He continues to state that the situation in the province was so precarious for the British that the "troops and inhabitants" at Fort Edward, Fort Sackville and Lunenburg "could not be reputed in any other light than as prisoners." (The militias had also contained British settlements at Dartmouth and Lawrencetown.)

The following year the militias engaged in the Lunenburg Campaign (1758).

== See also ==
- Military history of Nova Scotia
- Military history of the Maliseet people
- Military history of the Mi'kmaq people
