= William Black (Methodist) =

Anglo-Canadian minister (1760 - 1834)

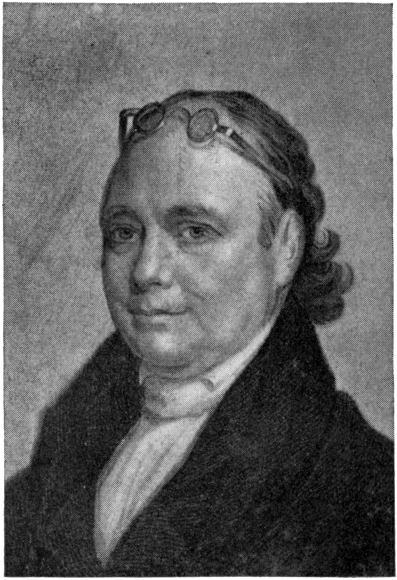
- Rev William Black by William Valentine (painter)
- Born: November 10, 1760
- Died: September 8, 1834 (aged 73)
- Occupation: Minister

William Black (November 10, 1760 – September 8, 1834) was a Yorkshireman and founder of the Methodist congregation in colonial Nova Scotia.

Black's daughter married the merchant and politician John Alexander Barry, who was the son of Robert Barry, a prominent businessman and Methodist. His son, Martin Gay Black, became a prominent businessman and also furthered the Methodist cause in Nova Scotia.

== Early life ==
Black was born 10 November 1760 in Huddersfield, Yorkshire, England, the second of five children of William Black, a Scottish draper originally from Paisley, and Elizabeth Stocks. He was raised for a time by an uncle at Otley, near Leeds, and received a solid primary education. In 1775, his family joined the wave of Yorkshire emigrants who settled in the Chignecto Isthmus of Nova Scotia, where his father acquired a farm near Amherst.

Many of the Yorkshire settler families in Nova Scotia were Methodists or had been influenced by John Wesley's teaching, and, lacking a resident minister, held informal religious meetings in their homes. Black experienced a religious conversion at one such meeting, probably in 1779, after a period of intense inner turmoil he later described in his own account of his life. He preached his first sermon in the spring of 1781 during a visit to the Petitcodiac settlements in present-day New Brunswick, and from November of that year devoted himself to itinerant preaching.

== Founding Methodism in Nova Scotia ==
Black organized Methodist societies as he travelled around Nova Scotia, though he had had no direct contact with Wesley and limited grounding in Methodist theology and discipline. In late 1782, he wrote to Wesley asking to be admitted to Kingswood School and requesting missionaries for Nova Scotia; Wesley promised assistance, though Black ultimately did not attend the school.

Black's mission faced strong competition from the New Light revival led by Henry Alline, which had unsettled the Congregationalist New England settlers of Nova Scotia. Black regarded some of Alline's followers as antinomian, and appealed repeatedly to Wesley for guidance and reinforcements Following Alline's death in February 1784, Black turned to the Methodist societies in the United States for support, meeting Thomas Coke and Francis Asbury in Philadelphia and attending the founding general conference of the Methodist Episcopal Church in Baltimore in December 1784. As a result of his appeal, missionaries Freeborn Garrettson and James Oliver Cromwell were sent to Nova Scotia, beginning a working relationship between Maritime Methodists and the American church that lasted until 1799.

In May 1789, Black was ordained and appointed general superintendent for eastern British North America by the American conference. He was based principally on the Halifax circuit but travelled widely, making missionary trips to the Saint John valley, Newfoundland, and St John's (Prince Edward) Island. In 1799, concluding that the American church could not reliably supply preachers for the eastern colonies Black sailed to England and secured, with Coke's support, the appointment of additional missionaries from the British Wesleyan Conference, arriving back in Halifax with them on 4 October 1800. From that point he served as chairman of the Nova Scotia District of the British conference.

== Personal life ==
Black married first, on 17 February 1784, Mary Gay, in Cumberland County, Nova Scotia, and they had five children, including Martin Gay Black, William Anderson Black, and Samuel Black, who became leading Halifax merchants, and a daughter, Mary, who married merchant and politician John Alexander Barry. He married secondly, on 20 July 1828, Martha Calkin, a widow, in Liverpool, Nova Scotia.

== Legacy ==
Known affectionately as "Bishop" Black and later described as "the Father of Methodism" in Nova Scotia and New Brunswick, Black is credited with founding the Methodist community in the Maritime colonies and, through his 1799–1800 mission to England, placing it under the jurisdiction of the British Wesleyan Conference rather than the Methodist Episcopal Church.

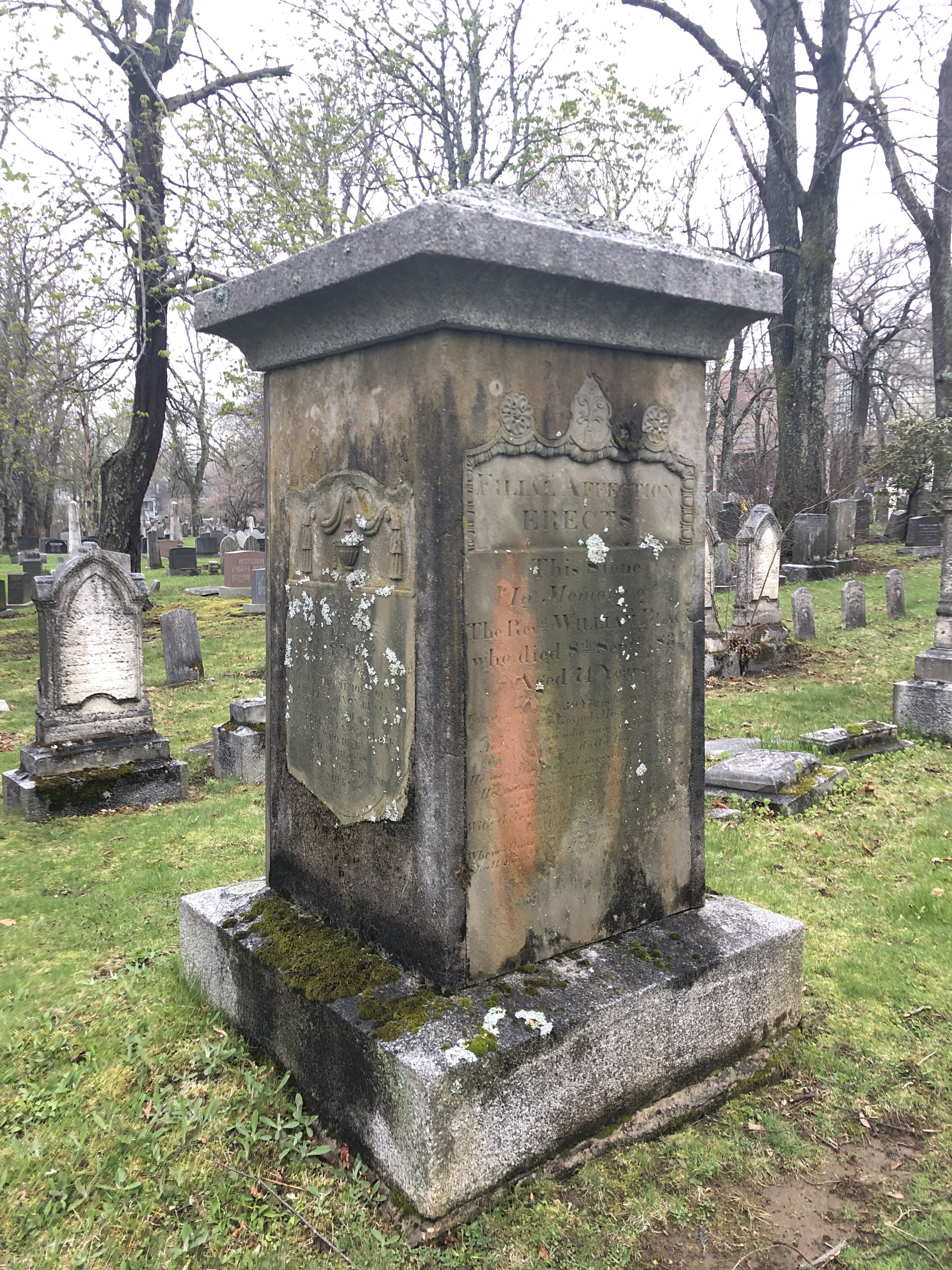
Rev. William Black, Camp Hill Cemetery

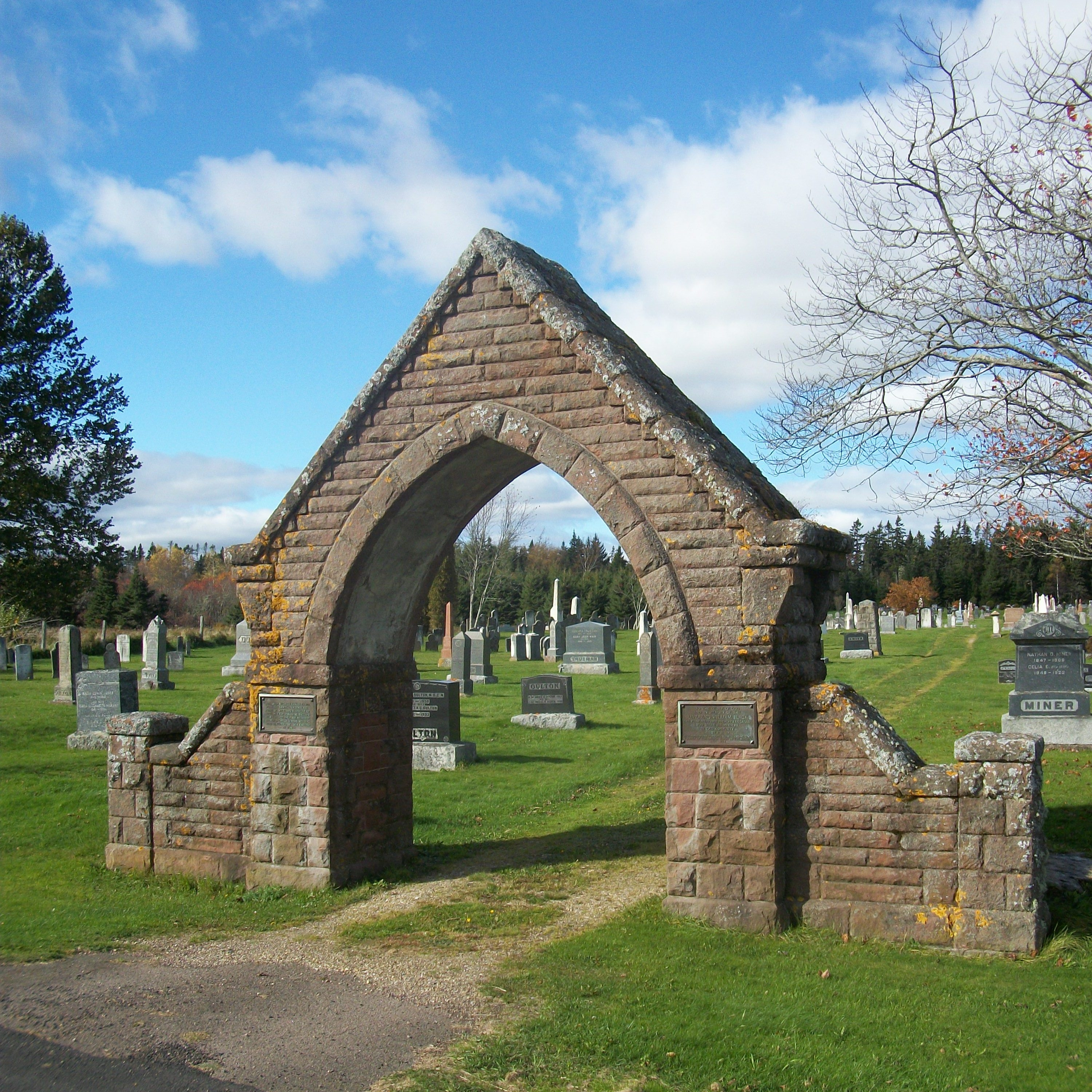
Cemetery in Point de Bute, New Brunswick, near where the first Methodist church stood and where Black would have preached.
