= Rice-Oxley =

Rice-Oxley is a surname. Notable people with the surname include:

- Alan Rice-Oxley (1896–1961), British World War I flying ace
- Mark Rice-Oxley (born 1969), British journalist, editor and columnist at The Guardian newspaper
- Tim Rice-Oxley (born 1976), British musician, producer, singer, multi-instrumentalist and member of the band Keane

== See also ==
- Rice (surname)
- Oxley (surname)
