= Arthur McNutt Cochran =

Canadian politician

Arthur McNutt Cochran (October 16, 1811 – 1883) was a merchant, ship owner and political figure in Nova Scotia. He represented Hants County in the Nova Scotia House of Assembly from 1859 to 1863.

He was born in Newport, Nova Scotia, the son of Terrance Cochran and Elizabeth Weir. At the age of 16, he joined his brother Loran De Wolf in business in Halifax, later setting up in business for himself in Maitland. He also operated a farm. In 1839, he married Susan Weir. Cochran was a justice of the peace, a school commissioner for East Hants and also served in the local militia for a time. In 1875, he was named to the province's Legislative Council.

His brother Felix also served in the assembly.
