= John Alexander Barry =

John Alexander Barry (c. 1790–1872) was born in Shelburne County, Nova Scotia and was the son of Robert Barry, a loyalist who came to Shelburne in 1773. His first wife was the daughter of the Reverend William Black, a Methodist minister.

== Biography ==
John was a successful merchant in Nova Scotia, carrying on part of the family business started by his father and uncle. He was a member of the 13th General Assembly of Nova Scotia for Shelburne, which ran from 1826 to 1830. He was expelled from the assembly during that session for making allegations about a fellow member and refusing to retract them. His battle with the legislature was carried out to a great degree in the press making him a popular hero and a well known Nova Scotian. A subsequent stand with the Tories during the "Brandy Dispute" of 1830 made him unpopular enough to make his future attempts at re-election unsuccessful. On April 30, 1835, he married Eliza Ann Mercein, from this marriage there were two children, Alexander Barry and Mary Mercein Barry. John Alexander Barry was fascinated by aboriginal people in the area, with whom it is believed he traded early in his merchant career. He became popular by his lectures, principally to Halifax audiences, on the customs, artifacts, and chiefs of the Miꞌkmaq and other North American Indians.

His gained notoriety when an unprecedented divorce suit was brought by his second wife Eliza Ann Mercein Barry in the 1840s for the custody of her infant daughter, since the court would not have committed her son to her under the law; she won custody. It is thought that living in Nova Scotia and trying to raise four daughters by John's first marriage, as well as her own two away from her parents in New York, and in light of John's indifference to his family, she took her daughter and returned to New York. Eliza's father was a Methodist minister in New York. His son, died in early adulthood in Oregon City, Oregon. His daughter, Mary Mercien Barry, married Joseph Ferry Andrews; their son Roger Fuller Mercein Andrews was head of the Mackinac State Park Commission 1920s - 1930s and the Mackinac Island News during the 1940s. In the 1930s he was publisher of the Detroit Times as well as director-general of Hearst Detroit publications.
