= John Murton =

John Murton may refer to:

- John Murton (diplomat)
- John Murton (theologian)
- John Murton (footballer)

== See also ==
- John Morton (disambiguation)
