= William Shey =

Canadian politician

William Henry Shey (ca 1770 – September 9, 1854) was a farmer and political figure in Nova Scotia. He represented Falmouth Township in the Nova Scotia House of Assembly from 1809 to 1811 and from 1826 to 1836.

He was the son of Peter Shey, a native of Ireland, and Frances Duport. Shey served as justice of the peace and custos rotulorum for Hants County. He served in the militia from 1807 to 1812. Shey was first elected to the provincial assembly in an 1809 by-election held following the death of Jeremiah Northup. He died in Falmouth at the age of 84.
