= John Oxley (cricketer) =

English cricketer

John Haywood Oxley (16 February 1850 – 4 July 1917) was an English first-class cricketer active 1882–83 who played for Middlesex. He was born in Kimberworth, Yorkshire; died in Sunbury-on-Thames.
