= John Johnston (Nova Scotia politician) =

Canadian politician

John Johnston (January 31, 1790 – July 11, 1836) was a lawyer and political figure in Nova Scotia. He represented Annapolis County in the Nova Scotia House of Assembly from 1829 to 1836. His surname also appears as Johnstone.

He was born in Kingston, Jamaica, the son of William Martin Johnston and Elizabeth Lichtenstein. He married Laura Stevenson there in 1823 and settled in Annapolis, Nova Scotia, where he set up a law practice. He was elected to the provincial assembly in an 1829 by-election held after Thomas Chandler Haliburton was appointed a judge. His wife died in a bedroom fire soon after he was elected. Johnston later married Mary Kelly. Johnston died at Falmouth, Nova Scotia after taking a sea voyage on the advice of his physician.

His younger brother James William Johnston served as premier of Nova Scotia.
