= John Alexander Weir =

Canadian attorney and law school dean (1894–1942)

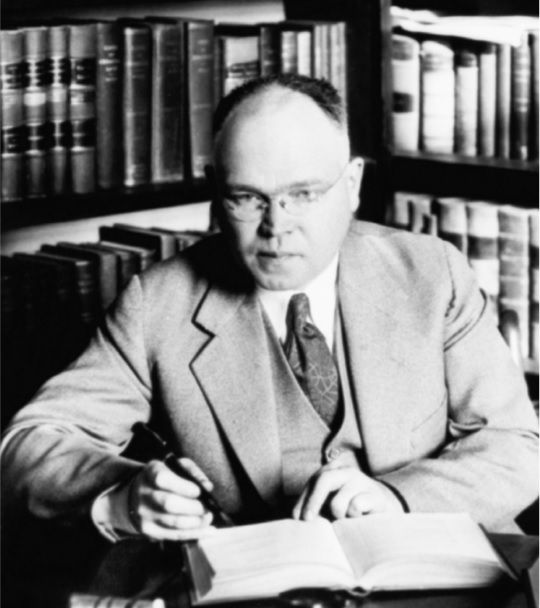
- Born: December 13, 1894; Ardoch, North Dakota, U.S.
- Died: June 3, 1942 (aged 47); Edmonton, Alberta, Canada
- Known for: First Dean of University of Alberta Faculty of Law

Academic background
- Education: Merton College, University of Saskatchewan

Academic work
- Discipline: Law
- Institutions: University of Alberta Faculty of Law

John Alexander Weir (December 13, 1894 – June 3, 1942) was a Canadian attorney, and the first Dean of the University of Alberta Faculty of Law from 1926 to 1942.

== Early life ==
John Alexander Weir was born in Ardoch, North Dakota on 13 December 1894 to the Reverend Richard and Margaret Moir Weir. He had three brothers and two sisters. Due to his father being called to new congregations the family traveled from Ardock to Hensall, Ontario when John was two years old, then to Petrolia, Ontario in 1898, and finally to Regina, Saskatchewan in 1901 where John attended the Regina public school. He continued his education by enrolling at Nutana Collegiate Institute in Saskatoon in 1908.

Weir graduated with University and Chancellor's Scholarships. He entered University of Saskatchewan with the class of 1912, was chosen for Rhodes Scholarship for Saskatchewan in 1914. He graduated with Bachelor of Arts in 1915 and Bachelor of Laws in 1916 from University of Saskatchewan. Weir joined the Army Medical Corps in 1916 and transferred to the Royal Air Force where he was sent overseas. By the end of the war, he was a Flying Officer. In 1918, he resumed his Rhodes Scholarship at Merton College, Oxford, where he received his Bachelor of Arts in the School of Jurisprudence with first class honours. Weir was given another scholarship by Oxford University to continue his graduate studies for one more year. During his vacations in England, he traveled to Germany, Italy, and France. Weir married Elizabeth Teviotdale in 1926 by whom he had three children, named Elizabeth, Ramsay, and John.

== Law career ==
Weir moved to Alberta to become the first professor of law in 1921 and the first Dean of the University of Alberta Faculty of Law, a position he held from 1926 until his death in 1942. Dean Weir faced challenges such as changing enrollment from year to year and the faculty being severely understaffing. He took care of administrative tasks which were necessary for running the law school, in addition to teaching a number of courses. The full-time faculty staff consisted of Dean Weir and his assistant, there was a plan in place to hire additional staff in 1930, but it was canceled the next year, due to drastic cuts to the University of Alberta grant.

Dr. Francis G. Winspear, who was teaching accounting at the University of Alberta at the time and shared an office with Dean Weir for a year, described him as a "dedicated lawyer" who "was untiring in his devotion to the students". Winspear mentioned, in his autobiography, the following quote from Weir, while addressing one of the law students in contracts class, "It is always desirable, Mr.___, if moral concepts are not on your side, to be very careful of your law."
