= John Morton (cricketer) =

English cricketer

Personal information
- Full name: John Morton
- Born: 17 August 1895; Coventry, Warwickshire, England
- Died: 28 May 1966 (aged 70); Leamington Spa, Warwickshire, England
- Batting: Right-handed

Domestic team information
- Years: Team
- 1929–1930: Warwickshire

Career statistics
Competition	First-class
Matches	9
Runs scored	162
Batting average	11.57
100s/50s	–/–
Top score	38
Balls bowled	–
Wickets	–
Bowling average	–
5 wickets in innings	–
10 wickets in match	–
Best bowling	–
Catches/stumpings	4/–
- Source: Cricinfo, 5 October 2015

John Morton (17 August 1895 – 28 May 1966) was an English cricketer active in the late 1920s and early 1930s, playing in nine first-class cricket matches. He was a right-handed batsman.

Morton made his debut in first-class cricket when he was selected to play for Warwickshire against Surrey at Edgbaston in 1929. He made eight further appearances in first-class cricket for Warwickshire to 1930, with his final appearance coming against Middlesex at Lord's. He scored a total of 162 runs in his nine matches, averaging 11.57, with a high score of 38. He later made a single appearance for the Warwickshire Second XI in the 1932 Minor Counties Championship against Durham, but made no further appearances for the first eleven.

He died at Leamington Spa, Warwickshire on 28 May 1966.
