= Henry Alline =

American–Canadian minister, evangelist, and writer

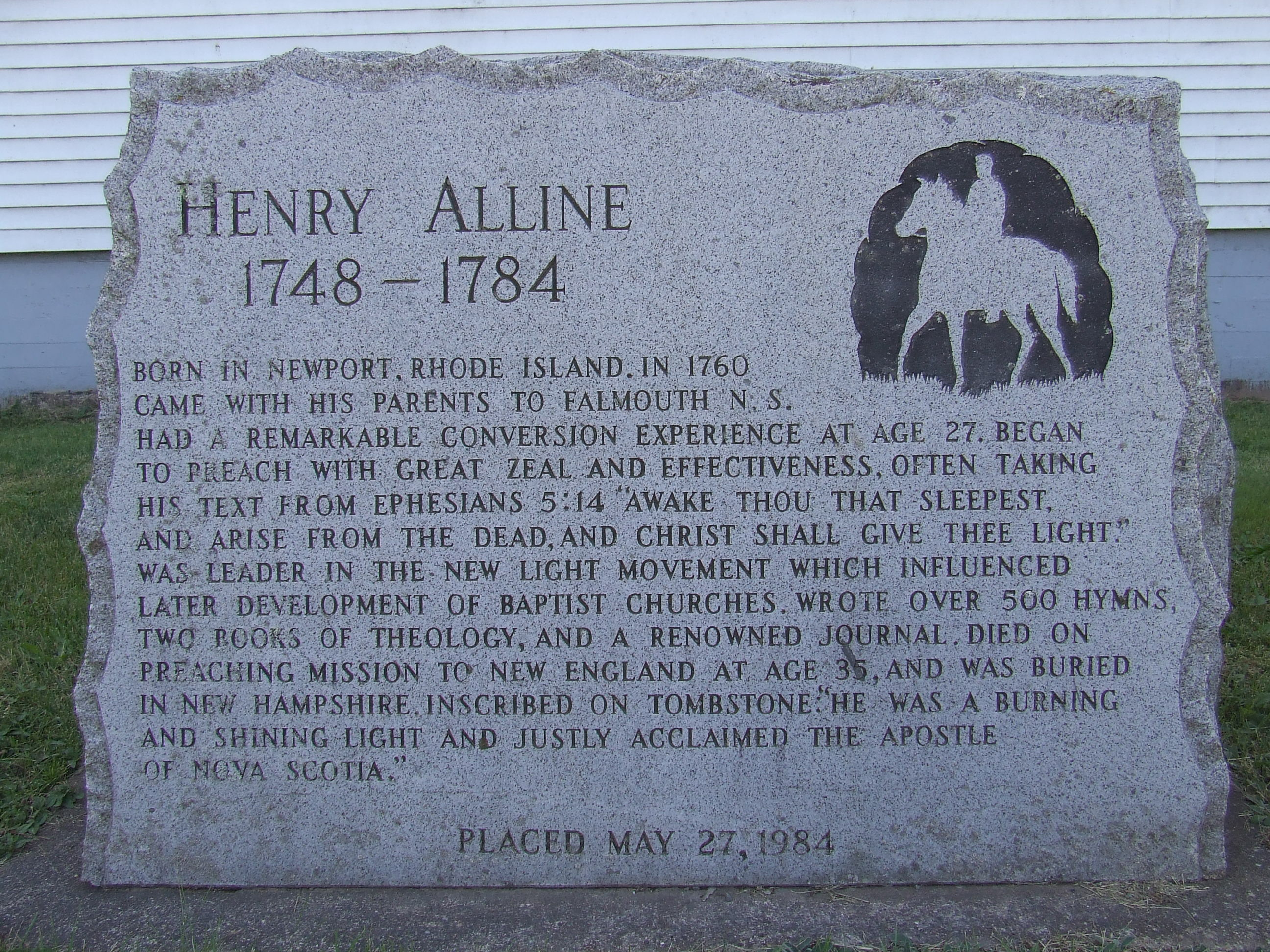
Henry Alline Monument, Falmouth, Nova Scotia

Henry Alline (pronounced Allen) (June 14, 1748 – February 2, 1784) was a minister, evangelist, and writer who became known as "the Apostle of Nova Scotia."

Born at Newport, Rhode Island, he became a New England Planter and served as an itinerant preacher throughout Maritime Canada and Northeastern New England from 1776 to 1784. His ministry coincided with the Second Great Awakening, and he became the leader of the New Light movement in the Maritimes.

Later in life, Alline caught the attention of renowned theologian John Wesley, but it was not for good reason. Wesley in one letter said that Alline was "far from being a man of sound understanding" and his work was not something Wesley wanted to "waste his time answering."

He died at 35 and is buried at North Hampton, New Hampshire.

== Historical context ==
The early 1740s to 1784 was a period of struggle for hegemony in North America by Britain, significant religious upheaval in northeastern North America, and ultimately revolution in the Thirteen Colonies.

=== War and revolution ===
Just before Alline's birth, the War of the Austrian Succession came to a close with the signing of the Treaty of Aix-la-Chapelle (1748). Northeastern North America had been pulled into the conflict by King George's War and achieved a significant victory with the capture of the Fortress of Louisbourg in 1745, only to have it returned to France during treaty negotiations. An uneasy peace remained between Britain and France. By the mid-1750s, conflict broke out again resulting in the Seven Years' War. Nova Scotia's population was decimated by the expulsion of the Acadians.

With the removal of the common enemy, France, a North American paradigm shift occurred in the political relationship between the British metropole and its New World colonies. The deteriorating relationship, in due course, resulted in the American Declaration of Independence and the American Revolutionary War.

=== Religious upheaval ===
The Second Great Awakening began in the last quarter of the 18th century. This period of evangelicalism heavily influenced the middle and lower levels of society. The movement generally advocated that the individual must have a direct relationship with God and that all people can be saved. For people living in New England, that was counter to their Calvinism whose idea is that only a preordained elected few would be saved. The Awakening's new ideas caused the new born faithful (New Lights) to shun vices and evil pastimes to live more personally in the Christian ethic.

== Early life ==
He was born in Newport, Rhode Island, the second child of eight, to William Alline and Rebeccah Clark. There, he lived and attended school until the age of twelve. By his own account, he was an advanced student. His religious education began by receiving instruction at school, in the church, and at home. At about the age of eight he appears to have had his first religious experience but was then not fully aware of its nature. The event placed him in a state of terror and drove him to seek out a fuller understanding of Christian theology.

After the deportation of the Acadians, Nova Scotia's fine farmlands in the Bay of Fundy region remained empty, and in an effort to repopulate the country, the British government offered the recently vacated lands in grant to Protestants who wished to move to the colony. William Alline took up the offer, arrived in the fall of 1760, and took up his land grant in Falmouth, Nova Scotia. With his family's move, Henry's formal education came to an end.

Life in the new land was hard and uncertain. He had left behind a vibrant town and warm comfortable home to replace it with a tent and food shortages. The new Planter townships lacked churches, schools, and other infrastructure familiar in the towns that they had left behind in New England. The townships remained isolated and connected to the outside world only by narrow paths through the forest and ships along the coast. For the first few years, as Britain and France remained at war, threats of attack by France's allies, the Mi'kmaq, remained a possibility.

The government in Halifax also soon began to break its promises. The Planters had initially been promised that their township governance model would be allowed in the new colony, but it was soon overturned for a centralized governance model, based in Halifax. That created a minor crisis but was overshadowed by the need to build new homes and farms to support the Planters' families. Town assemblies of a sort continued until 1770, when they were finally forbidden because of the sympathetic position emanating from the gatherings for the rebels to the south. Now a young man, Alline is likely to have participated in the assemblies. That was one of the factors that would lead the Planters to question where their loyalties lay: to the British or to their brethren in the Thirteen Colonies.

Alline appears to have been a product of his time over until 1776. He lived and worked on the family farm. As his siblings came to maturity they moved to their own farms, but he stayed on, supported his parents, and never married. As the second of only two sons, that was his obligation.

In his journal, he reported participating in the favourite pastime of the youths of the day of frolicking, which included dancing, partying, and drinking. Alline admitted to being one of the ringleaders of the raucous activities. Despite his leadership in the frolicks, he wrestled with his participation and felt it was perhaps a debauched life and contrary to finding a path to a more godly life: "I felt guilty as ever, and sometimes could not close my eyes for hours after I had got home to my bed, on account of the guilt I had contracted the evening before. O what snares were these frolicks and young company to my soul, and had God not been more merciful to me than I was to myself, they would have proved my fatal and irrevocable ruin."

Alline's second religious experience came when he was about 20. He experienced a vision of being "surrounded by an uncommon light; it seemed like a blaze of fire; I thought it out shone the sun at noon day...." He further noted, "The first conception I had was that the great day of judgment was come...." The vision remained over him for some time; "when I lifted my eyes, I saw, to my unspeakable satisfaction, that it was not what I expected: the day was not really come, therefore I had an opportunity of repentance...." Despite his second religious experience, he continued to backslide into his old ways but all the time continued to struggle with his predicament.

Although Alline's formal education came to an end at the age of 12, his thirst for knowledge clearly continued. He was self-taught, and when he could find texts, he studied them thoroughly. His reading was extensive and included works by William Law, John Fletcher, Edward Young, John Milton, Alexander Pope, John Pomfret, Isaac Watts, Martin Luther, John Bunyan, John Edwards, Increase and Samuel Mather, and perhaps even Jacob Boehme. His studies had brought him to a point that he "had read, studied and disputed too much, that I had acquired a great theory of religion...."

At 28 he had his third religious experience, the one that would turn his life around and propel him into his evangelical ministry. Unlike the previous experiences, which instilled terror within his soul, thie new experience felt that "his redeeming love broke into my soul with repeated scriptures with such power, that my whole soul seemed to be melted down with love". He now became committed to preaching the gospel.

== Ministry ==
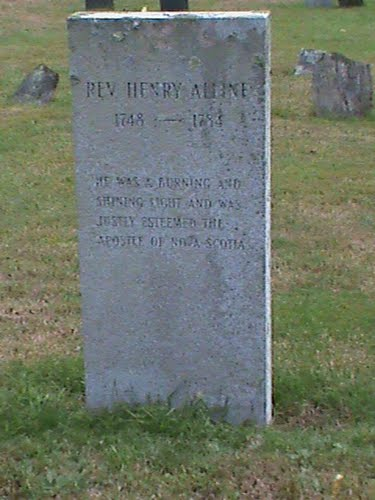
Alline's tombstone in Hampton, New Hampshire

Alline immediately revealed his rebirth experience to his parents, which they initially welcomed. With his announcement of his need and desire to spread the gospel, he came into conflict with them. Alline's parents were then in the sunset of their lives and depended on Henry's management of the family farm for their welfare. More importantly, however, they and Alline recognized that under the traditional Congregational churches, only appropriately educated and ordained ministers were eligible to preach.

That weighed heavily on Alline, who in short order attempted to sail to New England to seek the appropriate education and training. However, it was on the eve of the American Revolution, and the violent convulsions that began to occur in New England precluded his departure from Nova Scotia.

Despite his misgivings he began preaching in Falmouth, particularly after his neighbors heard that he had become a New Light and sought his advice and asked him to lead them in prayer. That again brought him at odds with his parents, who were known to walk out of churches in which he began to preach. In 1776 he began preaching at Newport, the township adjacent to Falmouth. His reputation as a gifted spiritual speaker spread, and soon, crowds were flocking to Falmouth to hear him.

The same year, both Falmouth and Newport formed churches with his assistance, were anti-Calvinist in nature and generally rejected, traditional Congregationalism. By 1777, Alline finally broke from his parents to pursue his evangelical ministry on a full-time basis. In 1778 the Horton and Cornwallis Townships sought his assistance to establish a Baptist church, which became the first Baptist Church in Canada. The following year, the church, along with the Falmouth and Newport New Light churches, ordained him. That act removed one of Alline's perceived impediments to his right to preach. Despite Alline's assistance in establishing the Horton/Cornwallis Baptist Church, a dispute concerning the proper mode of baptism denied him the fellowship.

Until 1783, Alline travelled extensively throughout the Planter-settled areas of Nova Scotia, the Saint John River Valley, and the Chignecto area. His effort to reach the people was Herculean by travelling mostly by foot and at times on horseback to reach every possible hamlet. His ministry was hugely successful and drew the attention and grudging admiration of even those who opposed him like Simeon Perkins of Liverpool, who stated, "Never did I behold Such an Appearance of the Spirit of God moving upon the people.... Since the time of the Great Religious Stir in New England many years ago." By 1783, even Alline's opponents acknowledged that the whole colony outside of Halifax had come under his revivalist influence. Despite his success, he was not accepted by all those he encountered. Opposition rose against him from those who thought he was a destabilizing factor to the day's social order: primarily government representatives in Halifax and the Anglican clergy that was fully integrated into the governmental power structure. Ministers of various other Protestant sects also opposed him on theological grounds, the New Light's jettisoning of an educated and "properly"-ordained ministry, and assuredly the loss of parishioners that eroded both tithing flows and the clergy's status in their community's hierarchy. A significant result of the revival was that it stimulated much more frequent contact among settlements, as Alline travelled to places that none had gone before.

Throughout that time, Alline established seven additional churches and composed his many hymns, pamphlets, sermons, personal journal, and two major theological works. The frantic pace that Alline imposed upon himself weakened his health and allowed the rapid advance of tuberculosis. Even so, he decided to travel to New England in 1783 to spread his New Light ideas to his former brethren. His ministry there lasted until he finally succumbed to his illness in February 1784.

== Death ==
Alline fell mortally ill the last week of January 1784 while he was preaching at North Hampton, New Hampshire. The Reverend David McClure, a Calvinist minister, and his family took him into their home and provided him with whatever comforts they could extend to a dying man. On February 2, he died of complications arising from tuberculosis. McClure and his Church arranged for Alline's burial in their own church burying ground. The epitaph they had cut into his tombstone reads, "He was a burning and shining Light, and was justly esteemed the apostle of Nova Scotia."

== Theology ==
Alline's New Light ideas moved away from but did not fully abandon its Congregationalist antecedents. Although he was anti-Calvinist on many points, he sought a renewal of the belief by returning it to the early church. Congregationalism had by the early 18th century become the established religion of New England, enjoyed its position and perks within society, and generally hardened its position with regard to the preordained few. It "had lost its lay orientation and spiritual radicalism."

The church needed to be returned to the people and so Alline moved to find the church's earlier purer form. He rejected the power structures in the church, its idea of predestination, and many of its traditions and ceremonial practices. He may have been "the first North American evangelical to argue the case against predestination." The new teaching revealed that all people have free will and so can be reborn into a personal relationship with God. He portrayed an eternally-loving God, who was waiting for those chose to take the right path. Those ideas were heavily influenced by earlier writers such as William Law.

Alline wrote and espoused many sound ideas, but others moved into the realm of mysticism, and some were simply convoluted. He taught that the souls of all humankind are emanations from the same spirit and that the spirits and the angels had lived in a paradise with God. Furthermore, Adam and Eve existed as one combined spirit. It was after the fall from heaven that Adam and humanity took on corporeal form and, as a group, participated in original sin. He further stated that all time (past, present, and future), occur instantaneously and that at the time of judgement, all will remember their participation in the act of original sin.

John Wesley was sent Alline's 'Two Mites Cast into the Offering of God, for the Benefit of Mankind' by the Nova Scotia Methodist leader William Black. Wesley concluded that Alline theology contained both "gold and dross" and, with respect to Alline's last section of 'Mites' dealing with metaphysical mysticism, "is very far from being a man of sound understanding; but he has been dabbling in Mystical writers, in matters which are too high for him, far above his comprehension. I dare not waste my time upon such miserable jargon."

Some of the success of Alline's theology clearly arose from his charismatic personality and oratorical gift, which drew people to his cause. He was also able to speak to the Planter populace's spiritual and political lives. The Planters had fallen into a melancholy by their isolation on a colonial frontier and their marginalization in the conflict arising in Nova Scotia's sister colonies. Their Calvinism was based on a fear of God and damnation, which could only create anxiety for most believers, as they would never achieve salvation since only the few were preordained to achieve reunion with God.

Few preachers were available to the Planters. Alline's very own township had not been able to attract a minister into its midst. The lack of guidance must have left the Planters in a spiritual vacuum. The troubles in the Thirteen Colonies further compounded the Planters confusion and fellings of aimlessness and left them in an awkward position with respect to both their former neighbours in New England and with the British authorities in Halifax.

With Alline's theology based on the eternal love of God and the ability of all people, male or female, high- or low-born, to achieve salvation, a path forward was perhaps available. That new radical idea instilled in the Planters a new feeling of identity and security. It pointed the way out of their spiritual malaise and showed them a path to achieve a nonconformist loyalty to the British authority but still be viewed by their New England neighbours as standing apart from the British. By default, they had found a neutrality of sorts and also began the process of creating a Maritime identity.

== Legacy ==
Though Alline made many converts to his religious ideas, the Allinites splintered into many competing Newlight sects after his death, such as Pansonites, Chipmanites, Kinsmanites, Blackites, Welshites, Hammonites, Palmerites, Brookites, Pearlyites, and Burpeites, and a few even turned to the Anabaptism. Most of the sects disappeared as quickly as they appeared, with the followers eventually merging with Wesleyan or Congregationalist churches or helping to establish two major Baptist denominations in the Maritime region. That legacy has made the region the Baptist bastion of Canada.

In America, his theology was a key generative factor in the birth of New England's Free Will Baptist churches.

Alline is Canada's most prolific 18th-century writer, publishing 487 hymns and spiritual songs, three sermons, many pamphlets, and two major theological works: Two Mites Cast into the Offering of God, for the Benefit of Mankind and A Court for the Trial of the Anti-Traditionalist His Journal was published posthumously and has now taken its place as one of the classics of North American spiritualism and Christian mysticism.

Gordon Stewart has written that in spite of being voluminous, Alline's journal is of limited utility since "his profuse and repetitive style often becomes little more than a list of the places he visited and a continual restatement of his spiritual travails.". By contrast, Jamie S. Scott argues that the travels recounted in the journal reflect the travails of the author's spiritual journey: "Embracing both psychological and theological readings," Scott writes, "The Life and Journal testifies to a lifelong struggle to transform both personal and public conditions of despair into conditions of harmony and hope."

== See also ==
- Rev. Freeborn Garrettson
- Rev. John Payzant
