= George Oxley =

Canadian politician

George Oxley (died 1820) was a farmer and political figure in Nova Scotia. He represented Cumberland County in the Nova Scotia House of Assembly from 1799 to 1806 and in 1820.

He was the son of George Oxley and Mary Bowden, who came to Nova Scotia from Yorkshire, England. He married Cynthia Bent, and together they lived at River Philip. Oxley was elected to the assembly a second time in 1820 but died before the assembly sat for the first time in December of that year.

His brother Joseph also served in the provincial assembly.
