= John Forman (Nova Scotia politician) =

Canadian politician

John Forman (July 2, 1798 – August 23, 1832) was a lawyer, judge and political figure in Nova Scotia. He represented Shelburne County in the Nova Scotia House of Assembly from 1829 until 1832.

He was born in Halifax, Nova Scotia, the son of James Forman and Mary Gardner. In 1827, he married Mary Tooker. He served as deputy clerk of the peace and as judge in the probate court. He was elected to the assembly in an 1829 by-election held following the death of James Budd Moody. Forman died in office at Yarmouth at the age of 34.
