= Felix Cochran =

Nova Scotian politician

Felix Cochran (1793 – July 16, 1853) was a political figure in Nova Scotia. He represented Newport township in the Nova Scotia House of Assembly from 1830 to 1836.

He was the son of Terence Cochran and Anne Weir. In 1819, Cochran married Mary Lockhart. He was defeated by James Whidden Allison when he ran for reelection in 1836. Cochran died in Newport.

His brother Arthur McNutt Cochran also served in the assembly.
