= John Homer =

Nova Scotian politician (1781–1836)

Member of the Nova Scotia House of Assembly
- In office 1826–1836
- Constituency: Barrington township

Personal details
- Born: September 3, 1781 Barrington, Nova Scotia, Canada
- Died: March 3, 1836 (aged 54) Halifax, Nova Scotia, Canada
- Spouse(s): Elizabeth B. White (m. 1812–d.), Nancy Crocker (m. 1823)
- Occupation: Merchant, politician
- Known for: Trade with West Indies and Europe, agricultural leadership, political service

John Homer (September 3, 1781 – March 3, 1836) was a merchant and political figure in Nova Scotia. He represented Barrington township in the Nova Scotia House of Assembly from 1826 to 1836.

He was born in Barrington, Nova Scotia, the son of Joseph Homer and Mary Atwood, and went to sea at a young age. He became a resident of the United States at the age of 17. In 1812, Homer married Elizabeth B. White. In 1814, he returned to Barrington. Homer was involved in the fishing trade and traded with the West Indies, United States, Holland, Denmark, Norway and Sweden. He also served as president of the Barrington Agricultural Society. He married Nancy Crocker in 1823 after the death of his first wife. In 1834, he published A brief sketch of the present state of the province of Nova-Scotia, with a project offered for its relief. Homer died in office of pulmonary disease at Halifax at the age of 54.
