= James Harris (Nova Scotia politician) =

Nova Scotia politician

James Harris (January 3, 1777 – February 26, 1848) was a farmer and political figure in Nova Scotia. He represented Horton township in the Nova Scotia House of Assembly from 1826 to 1836.

He was born in Horton, Nova Scotia, the son of James Harris and Anne Rathburn. Harris married Mary McLatchy. He served as a justice of the peace. Harris died in Horton at the age of 71.
