= James Russell Lovett =

Nova Scotian politician (1781–1864)

James Russell Lovett (1781 – March 17, 1864) was a merchant, contractor and political figure in Nova Scotia. He represented Annapolis township in the Nova Scotia House of Assembly from 1826 to 1836.

He was born at Round Hill, Nova Scotia, the son of Phineas Lovett and Abigail Thayer. In 1806, he married Sarah, the daughter of William Allen Chipman. Lovett lived in Annapolis Royal. He died at the home of his son-in-law in Halifax.
