= William Henry Roach =

Canadian politician

- Born: January 12, 1784; Annapolis Royal, Nova Scotia
- Died: October 6, 1861 (aged 77); Digby, Nova Scotia
- Occupations: Politician, businessman

William Henry Roach (January 12, 1784 – October 6, 1861) was a merchant and political figure in Nova Scotia. He represented Digby from 1818 to 1826 and Annapolis County from 1826 to 1836 in the Nova Scotia House of Assembly as a Reformer.

== Biography ==
He was born in Annapolis, Nova Scotia, the son of John Roach, and went to Jamaica at the age of 19, where he served as bookkeeper and then overseer for the Trelawny estate at Montego Bay. Roach also served in the local militia. In 1811, after returning from Jamaica, he married Mary Ann Timpany. For a time, he was based on the Hudson River in New York state, but he was forced to return to Nova Scotia at the start of the War of 1812, settling in Digby. After his defeat when he ran for reelection in 1836, he became an inspector of flour at Halifax.

== Death ==
Roach returned to Digby in 1850, where he died at the age of 77.
