= James Shannon Morse =

Canadian politician

James Shannon Morse (1783 – February 21, 1881) was a lawyer and political figure in Nova Scotia. He represented Amherst township in the Nova Scotia House of Assembly from 1818 to 1836.

He was born in Amherst, Nova Scotia, the son of Alpheus Morse and Theodora Crane. Morse studied law with Amos Botsford. In 1829, he married Augusta Agnew Kinnear. Morse served as a member of the province's Legislative Council from 1838 to 1843. He died in Amherst.
