= Donald A. Mackay =

American artist (1914–2005)

Donald Alexander Mackay (August 13, 1914 – December 17, 2005) was an American artist and illustrator. His illustrations appeared in Time, Life magazine, The New Times, Newsweek, National Geographic, and other publications. Born in Halifax, Nova Scotia, Mackay was raised in Boston and attended the Massachusetts College of Art. He died in Frederick, Maryland, in 2005.
