= John Elkanah Morton =

Canadian politician

John Elkanah Morton (1793 – April 20, 1835) was a political figure in Nova Scotia. He represented the town of Digby in the Nova Scotia House of Assembly from 1827 to 1830.

He was the son of Elkanah Morton. Morton married a Miss Beckwith. He served as captain in the local militia. He was later named customs collector at Digby. Morton died in Digby.

His son Fenimore E. Morton served as Solicitor General for New Brunswick.
