= Alexander Stewart (Nova Scotian politician) =

Canadian politician

Alexander Stewart (January 30, 1794 – January 1, 1865) was a lawyer, judge and political figure in Nova Scotia. He represented Cumberland County in the Nova Scotia House of Assembly from 1826 to 1838.

He was born in Halifax, the son of James Stewart and Elizabeth Bremner. After completing his schooling, he worked in John Moody's auction business, becoming a partner in 1814. He went on to study law in Halifax and Amherst. Stewart married Sarah Morse in 1816. Because he had not severed his ties with Moody by the time that the business failed in 1817, he lost all his possessions. Stewart went on to complete his studies in law, was called to the bar in 1822 and set up practice in Amherst. In 1834, he joined his brother James in practice in Halifax. Stewart lost his seat in February 1838 after his election was appealed; however, the month before, he had been named to the province's Legislative Council. He was named to the Executive Council in 1840. Stewart was vocal in his opposition to responsible government for Nova Scotia. In 1846, he was named Master of the Rolls for the province, judge in the court of chancery and judge in the vice admiralty court. Stewart was named a Companion of the Order of the Bath in 1856. He died in Halifax at the age of 70.

His daughter Elizabeth married Charles James Townshend.
