= James Budd Moody =

Nova Scotian politician (1790–1828)

James Budd Moody (May 20, 1790 – October 22, 1828) was a merchant, shipping agent and political figure in Nova Scotia. He was elected to represent Shelburne County in 1826 but apparently never took his seat.

He was born in Sissiboo, Nova Scotia, the son of John Moody and Margaret Budd. In 1821, he married Abigail Ward. Moody died at Yarmouth at the age of 38.

His uncle James Moody represented Annapolis County in the assembly.
