= Great Awakening =

Christian revivals in American history

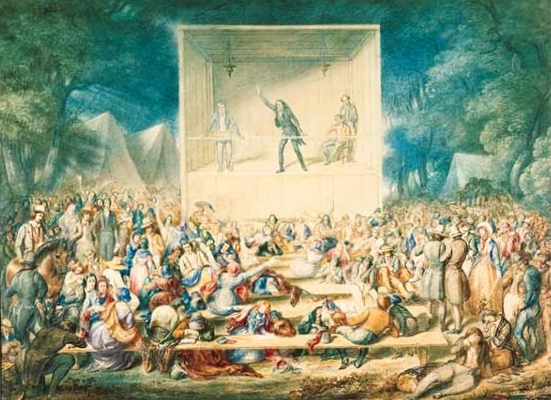
Watercolor representing the Second Great Awakening in 1839

The Great Awakening was a series of religious revivals in American Christian history. Historians and theologians identify three, or sometimes four, waves of increased religious enthusiasm between the early 18th century and the late 20th century. Each of these "Great Awakenings" was characterized by widespread revivals led by evangelical Protestant ministers, a sharp increase of interest in religion, a profound sense of conviction and redemption on the part of those affected, an increase in evangelical church comradeship, and the formation of new religious movements and denominations.

George Whitefield, Jonathan Edwards, Gilbert Tennent, and the New Lights and the Old Lights highly influenced the First Great Awakening. The First Great Awakening in the American colonies is closely related to the Evangelical Revival in the British Isles.

It incited division between traditionalists, who insisted on the continuing importance of ritual and doctrine, and revivalists who encouraged emotional involvement and personal commitment. It had a major impact in reshaping the Congregational church, the Presbyterian church, the Dutch Reformed Church, and the German Reformed denomination, and strengthened the small Baptist and Methodist denominations. It had less impact on Anglicans and Quakers. Unlike the Second Great Awakening, which began about 1800 and reached out to the unchurched, the First Great Awakening focused on those who were already church members. It changed their rituals, their piety, and their self-awareness.

== First Great Awakening ==
The First Great Awakening began in the 1730s and lasted to about 1740, though pockets of revivalism had occurred in years prior, especially amongst the ministry of Solomon Stoddard, Jonathan Edwards's grandfather. Edwards's congregation was involved in a revival later called the "Frontier Revivals" in the mid-1730s, though this was on the wane by 1737. But as American religious historian Sydney E. Ahlstrom noted, the Great Awakening "was still to come, ushered in by the Grand Itinerant", the British evangelist George Whitefield. Whitefield arrived in Georgia in 1738 and returned in 1739 for a second visit of the Colonies, making a "triumphant campaign north from Philadelphia to New York, and back to the South". In 1740, he visited New England, and "at every place he visited, the consequences were large and tumultuous". Ministers from various evangelical Protestant denominations supported the Great Awakening. In the middle colonies, he influenced not only the British churches, but the Dutch and German.

Additionally, pastoral styles began to change. In the late colonial period, most pastors read their sermons, which were theologically dense and advanced a particular theological argument or interpretation. Nathan O. Hatch argues that the evangelical movement of the 1740s played a key role in the development of democratic thought, as well as the belief of the free press and the belief that information should be shared and completely unbiased and uncontrolled. Michał Choiński argues that the First Great Awakening marks the birth of the American "rhetoric of the revival" understood as "a particular mode of preaching in which the speaker employs and it has a really wide array of patterns and communicative strategies to initiate religious conversions and spiritual regeneration among the hearers". All these theological, social, and rhetorical notions ushered in the period of the American Revolution. This contributed to create a demand for religious freedom. The Great Awakening represented the first time African Americans embraced Christianity in large numbers.

In the later part of the 1700s, the Revival came to the English colonies of Nova Scotia, New Brunswick, and Prince Edward Island primarily through the efforts of Henry Alline and his New Light movement.

== Second Great Awakening ==
The Second Great Awakening (sometimes known simply as "the Great Awakening") was a religious revival that occurred in the United States beginning in the late eighteenth century and lasting until the middle of the nineteenth century. While it occurred in all parts of the United States, it was especially strong in the Northeast and the Midwest. This awakening was unique in that it moved beyond the educated elite of New England to those who were less wealthy and less educated. A major center of revivalism was the so-called burned-over district in western New York. Named for its religious velocity that had spread like a fire, the region produced dozens of new denominations, communal societies, and reform.

Among these dozens of new denominations were free black churches, run independently of existing congregations that were predominantly of white attendance. During the period between the American revolution and the 1850s, black involvement in largely white churches declined in great numbers, with participation becoming almost non-existent by the 1840s–1850s; some scholars argue that this was largely due to racial discrimination within the church. This discrimination came in the form of segregated seating and the forbiddance of African Americans from voting in church matters or holding leadership positions in many white churches. Reverend Richard Allen, a central founder of the African Methodist Episcopal Church, was quoted describing one such incident of racial discrimination in a predominantly white church in Philadelphia, in which fellow preacher and a former slave from Delaware, Absalom Jones, was grabbed by a white church trustee in the midst of prayer and forcefully told to leave.

Closely related to the Second Great Awakening were other reform movements such as temperance, abolition, and women's rights. The temperance movement encouraged people to abstain from consuming alcoholic drinks in order to preserve family order. The abolition movement fought to abolish slavery in the United States. The women's rights movement grew from female abolitionists who realized that they could fight for their own political rights, too. In addition to these causes, reforms touched nearly every aspect of daily life, such as restricting the use of tobacco and dietary and dress reforms. The abolition movement emerged in the North from the wider Second Great Awakening 1800–1840.

== Third Great Awakening ==
The Third Great Awakening in the 1850s–1900s was characterized by new denominations, active missionary work, Chautauquas, and the Social Gospel approach to social issues. The YMCA (founded in 1844) played a major role in fostering revivals in the cities in the 1858 Awakening and after. The revival of 1858 produced leaders such as Dwight L. Moody who carried out religious work in the Civil War armies. The Christian and Sanitary Commissions and numerous Freedmen's Societies were also formed during the war.

== Fourth Great Awakening ==
The Fourth Great Awakening is a debated concept that has not received the acceptance of the first three. Advocates such as economist Robert Fogel say it happened in the late 1960s and early 1970s. The Jesus Movement is cited as evidence of this awakening, and it created a shift in church music styles.

Mainline Protestant denominations weakened sharply in both membership and influence while the most conservative religious denominations (such as the Southern Baptists) grew rapidly in numbers, spread across the United States, had grave internal theological battles and schisms, and became politically powerful.

== Terminology ==
The idea of an "awakening" implies a slumber or passivity during secular or less religious times. Awakening is a term which originates from, and is embraced often and primarily by, evangelical Christians. In recent times, the idea of "awakenings" in United States history has been put forth by conservative American evangelicals.

In the late 2010s and 2020s the term Great Awakening has been used by promoters of the QAnon conspiracy theory to denote awareness of their theory.

== See also ==
- Great Disappointment
