= William Rudolf =

Canadian politician

William Rudolf (June 6, 1791 – January 1, 1859) was a merchant and political figure in Nova Scotia. He represented Lunenburg County in the Nova Scotia House of Assembly from 1826 to 1838.

== Early life ==
He was born in Lunenburg, Nova Scotia, the son of John Christopher Rudolf and the grandson of one of Lunenburg's founders.

== Career ==
He operated a store in Lunenburg and owned a number of ships which traded in goods from the West Indies. Rudolf served his community as justice of the peace, postmaster, registrar of deeds and lieutenant-colonel in the local militia. In 1838, he was named to the Legislative Council, serving as a member until his death in Lunenburg at the age of 67. Although general conservative in politics, he supported measures in support of responsible government.

== Death ==
He was buried at Hillcrest Cemetery (Lunenburg, Nova Scotia).

== Personal life ==
In 1824, he married Catherine Stevens. He married Anna Matilda Oxner in 1833 after the death of his first wife. His widow, Anna Matilda Rudolf, served several years as postmaster for Lunenburg and died in 1886.
