= Joseph Oxley =

Canadian politician

Joseph Oxley (ca 1779 – March 18, 1868) was a farmer and political figure in Nova Scotia. He represented Cumberland County in the Nova Scotia House of Assembly from 1826 to 1836.

He was born in Amherst, Nova Scotia, the son of George Oxley and Mary Bowden, who came to Nova Scotia from Yorkshire, England. He married Elizabeth Stocks Black. Oxley was named a justice of the peace in 1836. He died at the age of 90 in Pugwash, Nova Scotia.

His brother George also served in the provincial assembly.
