= John Morton (Nova Scotia politician) =

Nova Scotian politician (1781–1858)

John Morton (March 25, 1781 – March 3, 1858) was a businessman and political figure in Nova Scotia. He represented Cornwallis township in the Nova Scotia House of Assembly from 1826 to 1840.

He was born in Cornwallis, Nova Scotia. the son of Lemuel Morton and Martha Newcomb. In 1810, he married Anne Cogswell. Morton owned Western Stage Coach. He served as lieutenant-colonel in the militia, as keeper of the rolls for Cornwallis and as justice of the peace for Kings County. He served as a member of the Legislative Council of Nova Scotia from 1841 until his death in Halifax at the age of 76.
