= John Wier (politician) =

Nova Scotian politician (c.1786–1861)

John Wier (c. 1786 – August 17, 1861) was a judge and political figure in Nova Scotia. He represented Londonderry township in the Nova Scotia House of Assembly from 1826 to 1836 and from 1847 to 1851 as a Conservative.

Wier was named a justice of the peace in 1824, serving until his death. He served as a judge in the Inferior Court of Common Pleas from 1840 until 1841 when that court was abolished. He died in Londonderry.
