= Falmouth, Nova Scotia =

Community in Nova Scotia, Canada

Falmouth
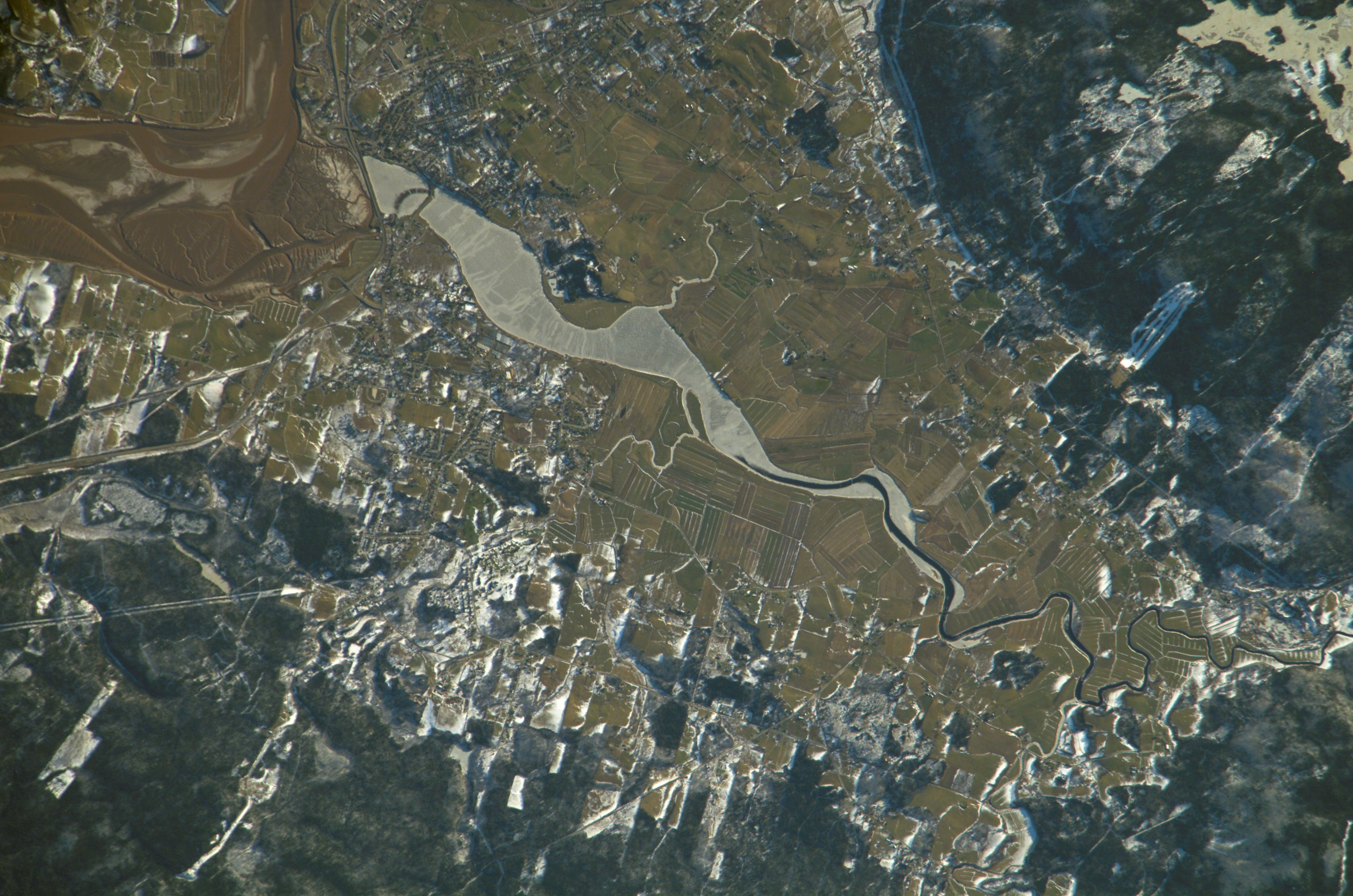
- Aerial view of Falmouth and Windsor

- Location within Nova Scotia
- Coordinates: 44°59′43″N 64°10′06″W
- Country: Canada
- Province: Nova Scotia
- Municipality: West Hants
- Time zone: UTC-4 (AST)
  - Summer (DST): UTC-3 (ADT)
- Postal code: B0P 1P0
- Area code: 902
- GNBC Code: CALNY

Falmouth (/ˈfɔːlməθ/ FAWL-məth) is an unincorporated community in the Canadian province of Nova Scotia, located along the Avon River in Hants County between Mount Denson and Windsor.

== History ==
Falmouth and the surrounding area was known as Pisiquid by the Acadians. Having migrated from Port Royal (current day Annapolis Royal) (see also Habitation at Port-Royal, an earlier settlement several miles away that predates the French occupation of Annapolis Royal), the Acadians first settled the area in the early 1680s, as the 1686 census lists a number of families on well established farms utilizing productive dyked fields. During Queen Anne's War, in response to the French Raid on Deerfield, Massachusetts, in the Raid on Pisiquid (1704), Benjamin Church burned the many villages of the two parishes (Ste. Famille and Notre Dame de l'Assumption) that made up the district to the ground and took prisoners to Boston. One of these prisoners was Acadian leader Noel Doiron. As with the other Acadian districts of the Bay of Fundy region, the Acadians of Piziquid were deported in the fall of 1755 (see Expulsion of the Acadians).

By 1760, the land, which was left vacant by the deportation of the Acadians, began to be resettled by New England Planters. Amongst these new settlers was a young Henry Alline, who in the 1770s would start a Great Awakening religious revival. His New Lights ideas and followers quickly spread across the region and into northeastern New England.

== Demographics ==
In the 2021 Census of Population conducted by Statistics Canada, Falmouth had a population of 1,553 living in 579 of its 605 total private dwellings, a change of 13.5% from its 2016 population of 1,368. With a land area of 5.21 km^{2} (2.01 sq mi), it had a population density of 298.1/km^{2} (772.0/sq mi) in 2021.

== Notable residents ==
- Amanda Peters, writer
- George Lawrence Price (1892–1918), last soldier of the British Empire to be killed in the First World War.
- Henry Alline (1748–1784), minister and writer
- Joseph Frederick Wallet DesBarres (1721–1824), cartographer
- Noel Doiron (1684–1758), Acadian leader
