= Sheila A. Hellstrom =

Canadian general (1935–2020)

Brigadier-General Sheila Hellstrom CD
- Born: January 15, 1935; Lunenburg, Nova Scotia
- Died: 7 December 2020 (aged 85); Ottawa, Ontario
- Alma mater: Mount Allison University, B.Sc. (1956)
- Military career
- Allegiance: Canada
- Branch: (Canada) Air Command (Note: Known as Royal Canadian Air Force until 1968)
- Service years: 1954–1990
- Rank: Brigadier-general
- Awards: Canadian Forces' Decoration; Honorary Doctor of Laws (LL.D), Mount Allison University

Sheila Anne Hellstrom CD (January 15, 1935 – December 7, 2020) was a Canadian Forces officer who became the first woman in the regular force to achieve the rank of brigadier-general in 1987, as well as being the first woman to graduate from Canadian Forces College.

== Early life and education ==
Hellstrom was born in Lunenburg, Nova Scotia in 1935. Her father was Albinus Hellstrom, and her mother was Dorothy Hellstrom née Zinck. She was baptized in Zion Evangelical Lutheran Church (ref. Pastor Rick Pryce Zion Church records) and attended Lunenburg County Academy, graduating in 1953. Hellstrom received her entire schooling at the Academy and during most of the years, led her classes. In an interview with Esprit de Corps magazine, she said that she became interested in the military after hearing stories told by Norwegian sailors who visited the family home from Camp Norway during WW2. Years later, in 1954, when she was 19 years of age, Hellstrom enrolled in the Royal Canadian Air Force (RCAF) University Reserve Training Plan. In 1956, she graduated from Mount Allison University with a bachelor of science (B.Sc.), majoring in Biology with a minor in Chemistry.

== Military career ==
After graduating, she was promoted to flying officer and served as a station services officer in RCAF Station Gimli, Manitoba. In 1962, she was promoted to flight lieutenant. Hellstrom had a number of postings between 1959 and 1969, serving as a personnel administrations officer in Toronto, Montreal, St. Hubert, North Bay, and Ottawa.

From 1973 to 1974, she attended the Canadian Forces Staff College in Toronto. In 1976, Hellstrom was promoted to lieutenant colonel and worked as a delegate to the Committee on Women in the NATO forces.

Promoted to colonel in 1983, she became the director of women personnel. When the Department of National Defence's Charter Task Force attempted to challenge the equity provisions of the Canadian Charter of Rights and Freedoms, Hellstrom was appointed in 1985 as the acting director-general conditions of service. In 1986, Hellstrom served as the advisor for the Administration Branch until posted to National Defence College Kingston.

On January 27, 1987, Hellstorm was the first woman in the regular force to achieve the rank of brigadier-general, taking on the role of director-general for personnel. In March 1988, Hellstorm appeared as a guest on the CBC gameshow Front Page Challenge. For a two year period, from 1987 to 1989, Hellstrom was chair of the Committee on Women in the NATO Forces. Throughout her career, Hellstrom worked for the recruitment and integration of women into the Canadian Forces.

Awards:

- Canadian Forces Decoration, 2nd Clasp
- Special Service Medal, NATO bar
- Woman of the Year, Zonta Club of Charlottetown (1988)
- Ottawa Police Services Board Community Service Award (1993)
- Queen's Golden Jubilee Medal (2002)
- Commissionaires Long Service Medal and Clasp (2011)

=== Honorary degree ===
Location	Date	School	Degree
New Brunswick	1989	Mount Allison University	Doctor of Laws (LL.D)

== Retirement ==
In 1990 Hellstrom retired from the regular forces and transferred to the supplementary reserve. She lived in Ottawa and continued to work with the military, as a consultant on gender integration. She served as a chair of the Board of Governors of the Ottawa Division Canadian Corps of Commissionaires and worked as a member of the Ottawa Police Services Board as an advisor on women in police services, race relations, and employment equity. She also worked with the minister of national defense's monitoring committee on change within the Department of National Defense and the Canadian Forces, restructuring of the Land Force Reserve, Canadian Forces professional development, education and leadership (refer to her awards above). She was an active member of the Canadian Nordic Society, and was a hockey and opera fan, attending many opera performances in Europe, the United States and Canada. On Saturday December 5, 2000 from 1:00 pm until 5:00 pm, shortly before she died in her Ottawa home, Hellstrom listened to a four-hour presentation on CBC of Prokoviev's opera War and Peace. On December 7, 2020, Hellstrom died in Ottawa. Her burial took place in Beechwood Cemetery, Ottawa.
