= Zion Evangelical Lutheran Church (Lunenburg) =

Church in Nova Scotia, Canada

Coordinates: 44°22′44.7″N 64°18′43.6″W

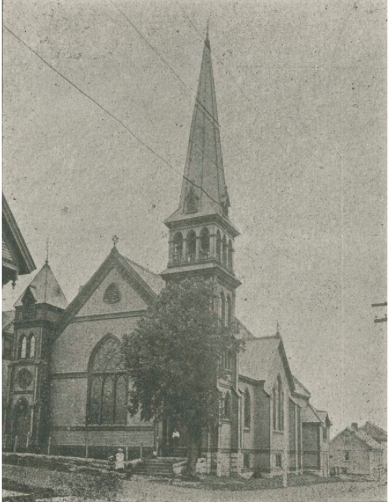
Zion Evangelical Lutheran Church (c. 1896)

The Zion Evangelical Lutheran Church is a church in Lunenburg, Nova Scotia. The church is the home of the oldest active Lutheran congregation in Canada. German Lutheran settlers arrived in 1753 and held services in the open air and later at St. John's Anglican Church (Lunenburg). The first church on this site was built in 1772 in preparation for the arrival of its first pastor, the Rev. Mr. Friederich Schultz at Lunenburg. He stayed for 8 years.

After the position was vacant for two years, Johann Gottlob Schmeisser arrived in Lunenburg on 1 May 1782. Within a month of arriving in the community, the Lutheran minister was involved in defending the town from American invaders in the Raid on Lunenburg (1782). He is buried at the Hillcrest cemetery.

In 1814, Dettlieb Christopher Jessen donated to the church a silver paten and two chalices.

Third minister was Ferdinand Conrad Temme (1808-1832). He was forced to leave Principality of Brunswick-Wolfenbüttel (part of present-day Germany) in 1806 when Duke Charles William Ferdinand was defeated by Napoleon's troops in the Battle of Auerstedt. Temme described his initial response to being posted to Lunenburg: "I reluctantly accepted this call ... and on 5th of February, 1708, commenced the voyage to the Siberia of North America." He stayed at Lunenburg for 24 years. Almost 50 years after he died, the congregation built a monument to him in the Hillcrest cemetery.

The position of pastor was vacant for three years until the arrival of Rev. Charles Ernst Cossman (1835-1876). He was a pupil of Wilhelm Gesenius at the University of Hale. Cossman described how clergy thought about leaving Germany to come to Lunenburg: "not one would go because Nova Scotia was so far, such a dreary land and only a salary of $400 was offered; less than a common school-master in Germany." He stayed in Lunenburg 46 years. He is buried at the Hillcrest Cemetery (Lunenburg, Nova Scotia).

The church was replaced in 1841. The present building dates from 1890 and was designed in the High Victorian Gothic style.

The only remains of the first Lutheran church are the key to the building and the Saint Antoine-Marie bell that had formerly hung in the Fortress of Louisbourg (St. Joseph is engraved on the bell, created 1723, Brittany, France) and had been purchased by the congregation in 1776.

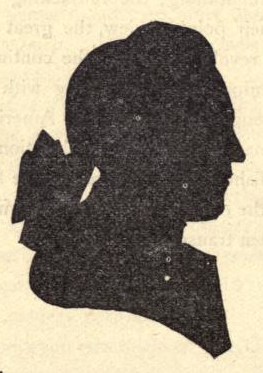
Johann Gottlob Schmeisser, 2nd minister (1782-1808)

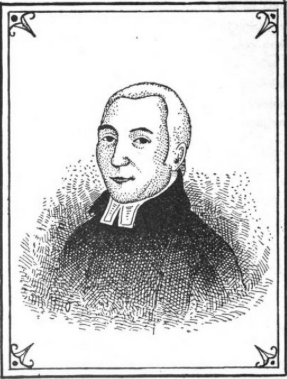
Ferdinand Conrad Temme, 3rd minister (1808-1832)

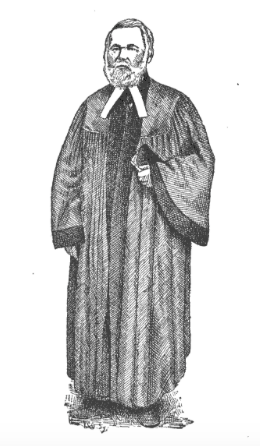
Charles Ernst Cossman, 4th minister (1835-1876)

== See also ==
- Little Dutch (Deutsch) Church
- St. John's Anglican Church (Lunenburg)
- Foreign Protestants
- List of historic places in Lunenburg County, Nova Scotia
