= Hillcrest Cemetery (Lunenburg, Nova Scotia) =

Historic cemetery

Coordinates: 44.381157°N 64.315206°W

The Hillcrest Cemetery is the oldest protestant cemetery in Lunenburg, Nova Scotia and one of the oldest in Canada. The cemetery is adjacent to the Lunenburg Academy. The oldest marker is dated 1761, eight years after Lunenburg was established. Hillcrest Cemetery contains 5 Commonwealth war graves from World War I and one from World War II (along with 4 Norwegian war graves from Camp Norway).

== Notable interments ==
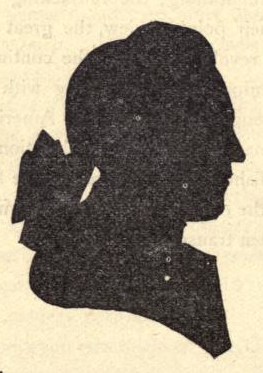
Johann Gottlob Schmeisser, 2nd minister (1782–1808), Zion Evangelical Lutheran Church (Lunenburg)

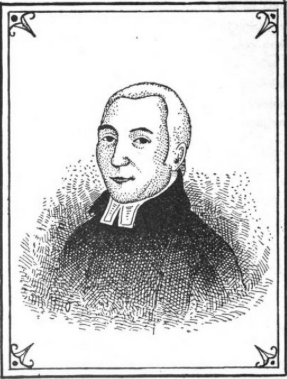
Ferdinand Conrad Temme, 3rd minister (1808–1832), Zion Evangelical Lutheran Church (Lunenburg)

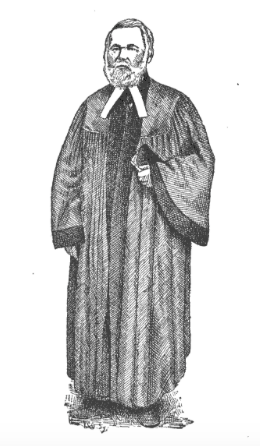
Charles Ernst Cossman, 4th minister (1835–1876), Zion Evangelical Lutheran Church (Lunenburg)

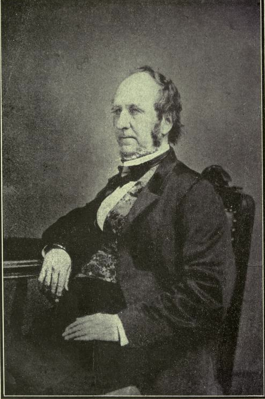
Beamish Murdoch, Historian
- Honourable William Rudolf
- Rev. Joshua Wingate Weeks (d. 1852), St. Peter's Church, West LaHave Ferry (Grandson of Rev. Joshua Wingate Weeks of St. Paul's Church (Halifax))
- Capt. J. F. McGregor

== See also ==
- Little Dutch (Deutsch) Church
- Garrison Cemetery (Annapolis Royal, Nova Scotia)
- Royal Navy Burying Ground (Halifax, Nova Scotia)
- Old Burying Ground (Halifax, Nova Scotia)
- Old Parish Burying Ground (Windsor, Nova Scotia)
