= Evangelical Lutheran Church (Frederick, Maryland) =

Historical building

Coordinates: 39°24′56″N 77°24′34″W

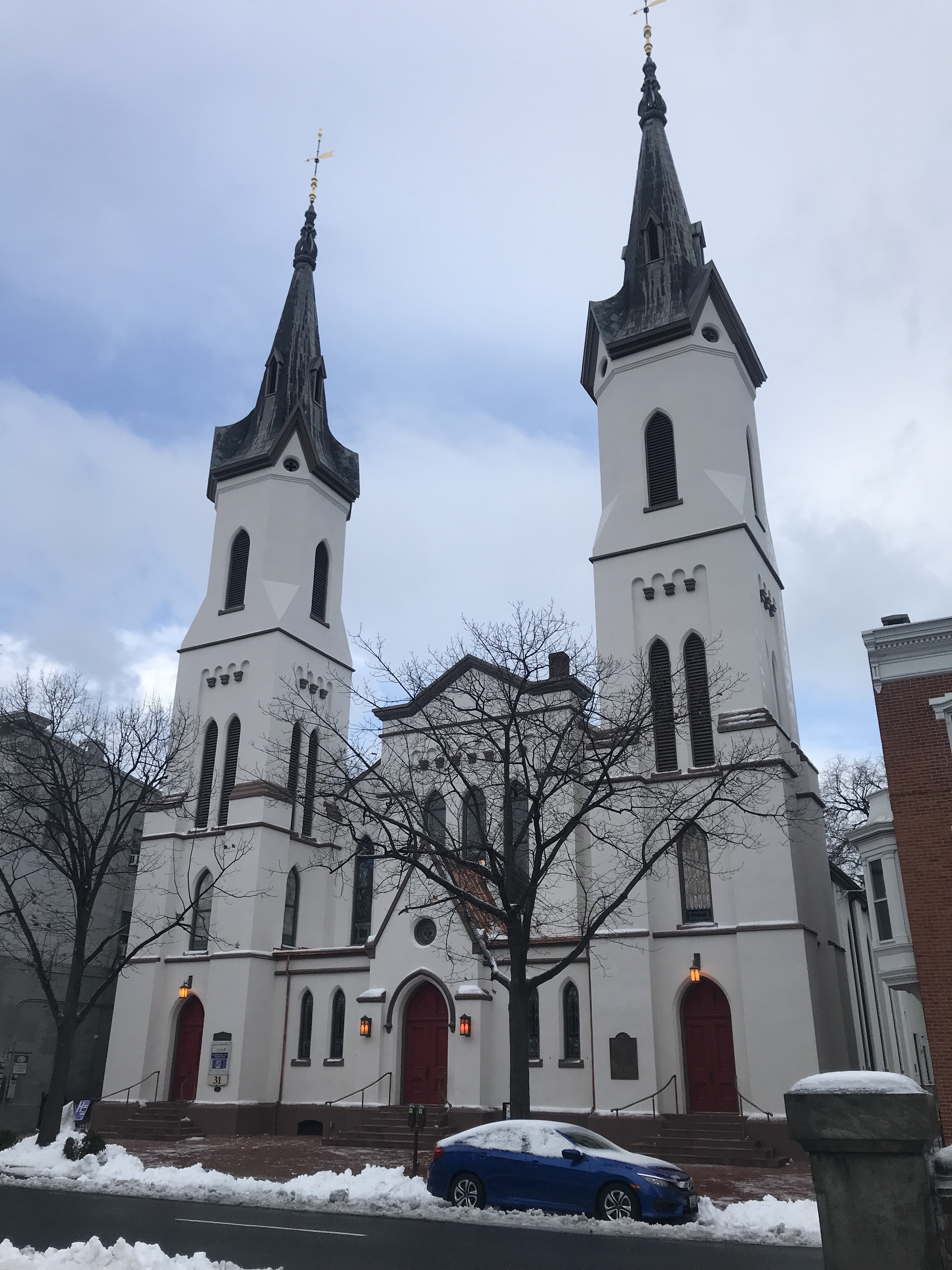
- Evangelical Lutheran Church (2022)

Religion
- Affiliation: Evangelical Lutheran Church in America

Location
- Location: 31 E Church St, Frederick, Maryland, United States
- Interactive map of Evangelical Lutheran Church

The Evangelical Lutheran Church of Frederick, Maryland is the oldest Evangelical Lutheran Church in America in Maryland (1752) and one of the oldest in the United States. While the congregation began to meet in 1733, the first minister of the church was Rev. Bernard Michael Houseal (1752-1759). The building of the church was slowed because of the outbreak of the French and Indian War but was completed before the war was over (1762).

Founded by German immigrants, church services were entirely in German until 1810. English was introduced in that year, with both German and English sermons until 1816. After 1816, all sermons were in English.

== Gallery ==
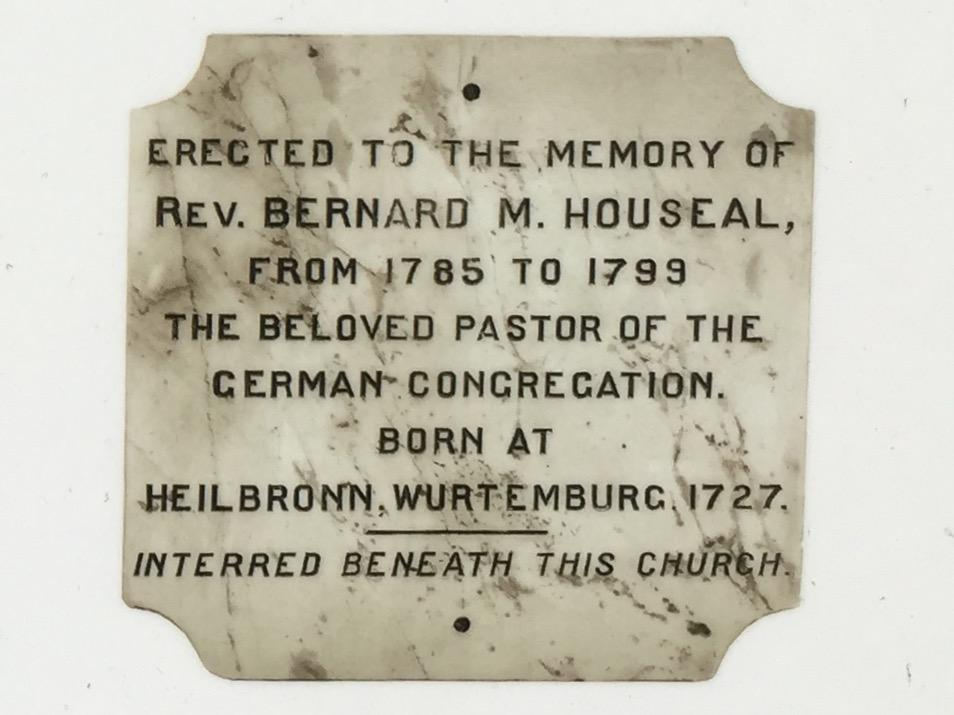
Rev Bernard Michael Houseal, Little Dutch (Deutsch) Church

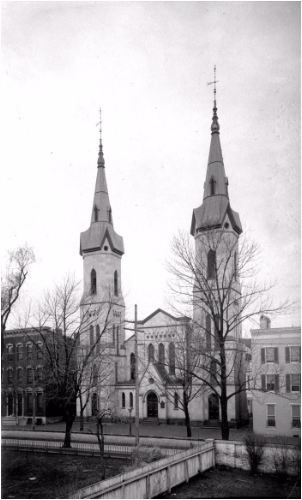
Evangelical Lutheran Church, Frederick, Maryland (built 1752-1762)

== See also ==
- All Saints Church (Frederick, Maryland)
- Pennsylvania Ministerium
