= Otto William Schwartz =

Canadian politician

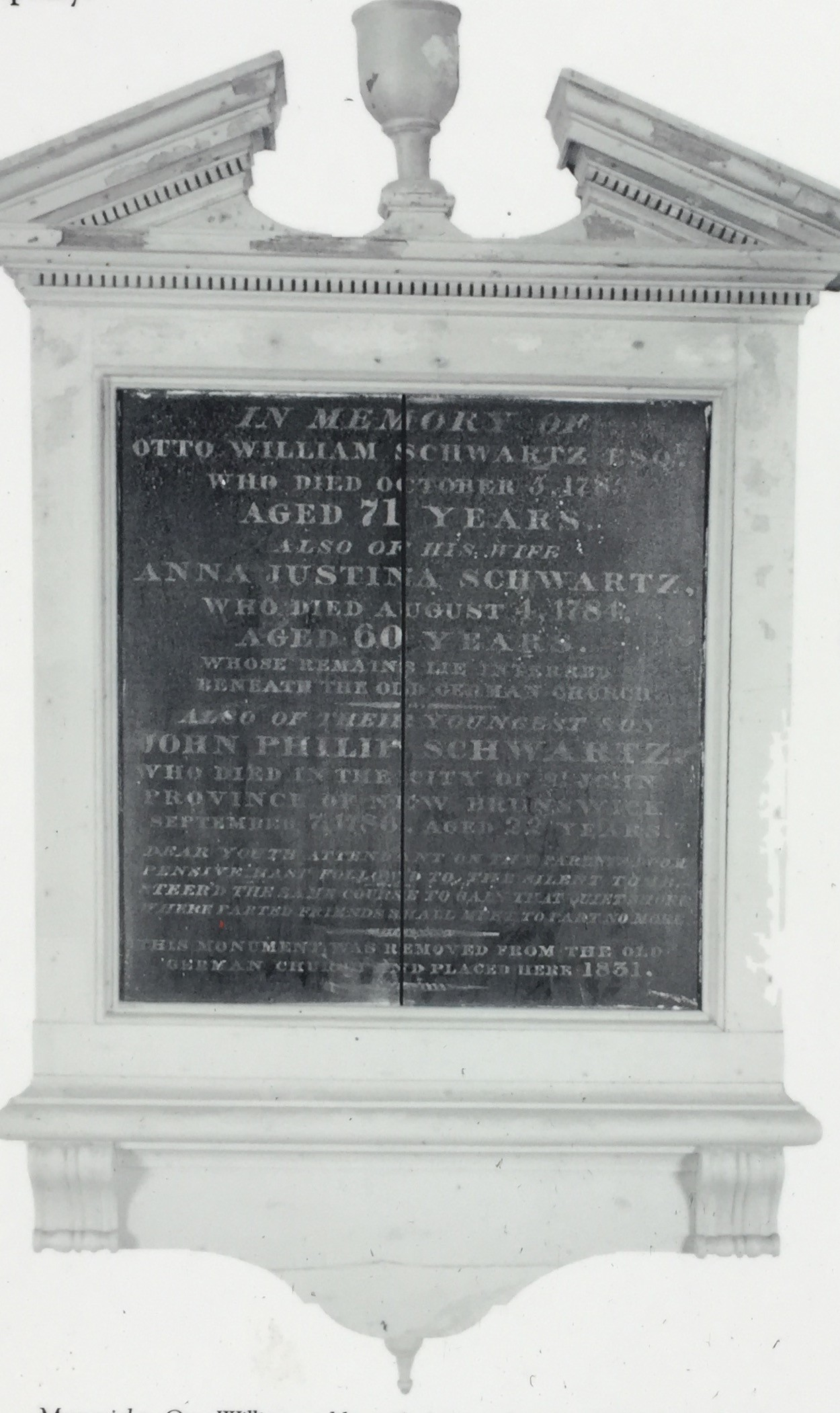
Otto William Schwartz, Little Dutch (Deutsch) Church, Halifax, Nova Scotia

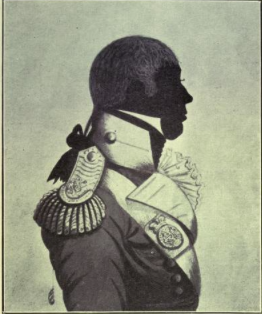
Grandson Otto Schwartz, Nova Scotia Fencibles, c. 1806

Otto William Schwartz (May 12, 1715 – October 5, 1785) was a Russian-born fur trader and political figure of German descent in Nova Scotia. He arrived with Governor Edward Cornwallis and represented Lunenburg County (i.e., the Foreign Protestants) in the Nova Scotia House of Assembly from 1773 to 1785.

He was born Otho Wilhelm Schwartz near Riga. Schwartz entered the fur trade and, in 1749, came to Halifax with Edward Cornwallis. The following year, he married Anna Justina Liebrich, a widow. In 1757, he joined the petitioners seeking representation in Nova Scotia. In 1760, Schwartz was named "Furrier for the Indian Commerce". His business prospered and he acquired large tracts of land. Schwartz was captain in the militia, served on the grand jury at Halifax and was a commissioner of sewers for Falmouth Township. He helped found a church for people of German descent in the Halifax area, known as "Little Dutch (Deutsch) Church". Schwartz died in Halifax at the age of 70. His remains are believed to have been buried in the a crypt under the church.
