= Lunenburg Rebellion =

1753 insurrection in Nova Scotia

The Lunenburg Rebellion
- Part of Father Le Loutre's War
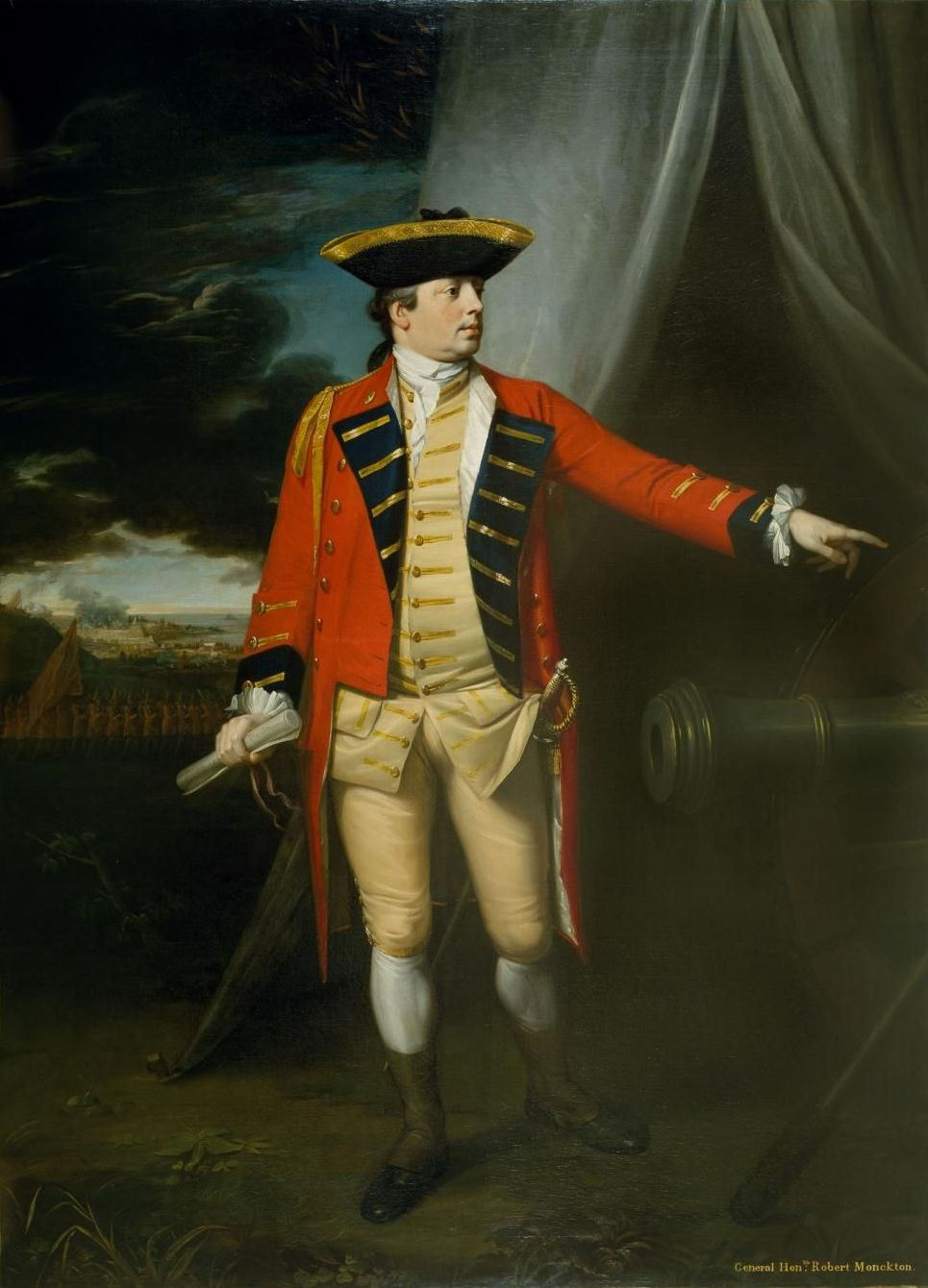
- In December 1753, the British dispatched Robert Monckton to quell the rebellion. The British feared the French and German Protestant rebels might have joined the Acadians.
Date	mid December, 1753
Location	Lunenburg, Nova Scotia
Result	British victory

Belligerents
Foreign Protestants and other settlers	Great Britain: British America

Commanders and leaders
John Hoffman	Colonel Robert Monckton

The Lunenburg Rebellion (also known as "The Hoffman Insurrection") was an insurrection in December 1753 by the new settlers at Lunenburg, Nova Scotia, over poor living conditions as well as weariness of the Foreign Protestant settlers from repeated resettlement by the British. It was led by army captain John Hoffman within the first year of settlement, against the British, amidst the backdrop of Father Le Loutre's War (1749-1755) between Britain and France.

== Background ==
Halifax, Nova Scotia was the first British colony settled at public expense, from 1749-1764. The goal of this project was to provide a preferred or loyal population to contend with Acadians for land and resources. Issues with the initial settlement of Halifax led to the British government, desperate in its search for a new source of settlers, to turn to settling Nova Scotia with "Foreign Protestants" made up of Swiss, French Huguenots, and Germans.

The British Board of Trade hired John Dick, a young Scotsman and recruiting agent, to recruit Foreign Protestants and promised them land, a year's subsistence, and arms and tools. Transportation was not free, although some settlers were able to finance their passage by contracting their labour to the government. Dick was criticized for collecting 'in general old miserable wretches', misleading prospective settlers about New World conditions, exploiting their labour, and overcrowding ships. In total, he transported over 2700 "Germans and Swiss", many of which were French Huguenots from Lorraine.

Although the British government intended to settle these Foreign Protestant settlers in agricultural communities, such as the Bay of Fundy, most remained in Halifax because of uncertainty over Acadian land titles. The Foreign Protestant settlers did not like the "shanty town" and complained of an inability to obtain land, building materials, as well as having to pay high rents and prices. These settlers not receiving what they were promised and the hardships they endured to that point led to building frustrations. Because of problems with these settlers, the British government stopped recruiting Foreign Protestants in 1752.

In the spring of 1753, it became public knowledge that the British were planning to unilaterally establish the settlement of Lunenburg, without negotiating with the Mi'kmaq people. The British decision was a continuation of violations of an earlier treaty and undermined Chief Jean-Baptiste Cope's 1752 Peace Treaty. As a result, Governor Peregrine Hopson received warnings from Fort Edward that as many as 300 natives nearby were prepared to oppose the settlement of Lunenburg and intended to attack upon the arrival of settlers. The move was part of the British government's campaign to establish Protestants in Nova Scotia against the power of Catholic Acadians.

In June 1753, 1400 German and French Protestant settlers, supervised by British Officer Charles Lawrence and protected by the British Navy ships, a unit of Regular soldiers under Major Patrick Sutherland, and a unit of rangers under Joseph Gorham, established the village of Lunenberg. The settlement was founded by two British army officers John Creighton and Patrick Sutherland and German-immigrant local official Dettlieb Christopher Jessen.

== Conflict with the British and Outcome of the Rebellion ==
As a desperate solution to the "foreigner" problem, it was decided to move the Foreign Protestants to Merligash (renamed Lunenburg), under the direction of Charles Lawrence. On 19 June 1753 they were given town lots and within two months it was reported by Lawrence that although the settlers had set up homes and gardens, the settlers were 'inconceivably turbulent, I might have said mutinous'. The Protestant settlers were fed up with not receiving promised farmland and the treatment they'd received at the hands of the British.

In mid-December 1753, within six months of their arrival at Lunenburg, Nova Scotia, the new settlers rebelled against the British, supported by Father Jean-Louis Le Loutre. The incident appears to have been sparked by rumours created by Jean Pettrequin of a letter from London, that the settlers were not receiving all support authorized by the British Parliament.

The rebellion is often referred to as "The Hoffman Insurrection," because it was led by John Hoffman, one of the army captains who had established the settlers in the town. Hoffman, a previous Justice of Peace at Halifax, led a mob that eventually locked up in one of the blockhouses the Justice of the Peace and some of Commander Patrick Sutherland's troops. The rebels then declared a republic. Commander Patrick Sutherland at Lunenburg asked for reinforcements from Halifax and Lawrence sent Colonel Robert Monckton with troops to suppress the rebellion. Monckton arrested Hoffman and took him to Halifax. Hoffman was charged with planning to join the French and take a large number of settlers with him. He was fined and imprisoned on Georges Island (Nova Scotia) for two years, after what appears to be Nova Scotia's first (aborted) treason trial in 1754.

After the rebellion a number of the French and German-speaking Foreign Protestants left the village to join Le Loutre and the Acadians. The rebellion and fallout of the rebellion was considered by the British to be yet another mark against the Acadians, who continued to seek neutrality while farming lands the British intended to settle new colonists on.

== See also ==
- Father Le Loutre's War
- Foreign Protestants
- List of incidents of civil unrest in Canada
- Lunenburg, Nova Scotia
- Military history of Nova Scotia
