= Leonard Lockman =

Surgeon and military figure (1697–1769)

Leonard Lockman (1697–1769) was a surgeon and military figure who helped establish Halifax, Nova Scotia (1749) and Lunenburg, Nova Scotia (1753). He is buried under the Little Dutch (Deutsch) Church in Halifax. He is the namesake of Lockman Street, Halifax, Nova Scotia (named changed to Brunswick St. after paving in 1908).
