= Johann Gottlob Schmeisser =

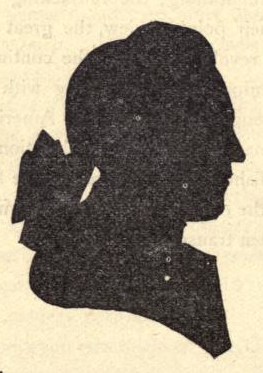
Johann Gottlob Schmeisser - earliest known image of Foreign Protestant in Nova Scotia (c.1790)

Johann Gottlob Schmeisser (22 March 1751 – 21 December 1806) was an Evangelical Lutheran minister who was the second minister of Lunenburg, Nova Scotia and served for 24 years. He arrived during the American Revolution, and, after being in the village for only two months, he was involved in the defense of the town during the Raid on Lunenburg, Nova Scotia (1782).

== Germany ==
Schmeisser's parents were Meister J. Schumeisser and Eva Dorothea. He was born in Weissenfels. Schmeisser attended the Lyceum at Weissenfels for several years. Because his father only had the income of a tailor, at age 25, the town sponsored Schmeisser to attend the University of Halle in 1777. The town indicated that Schmeisser was awarded the money because "he has led an industrious, quiet, and systematic life, and by his good behaviour has won the praise of his teachers and of the town." He was ordained at Wernigerode. He also worked in Leipzig. He eventually left for Nova Scotia via London, where he stayed for a number of weeks.

== Nova Scotia ==
Schmeisser followed Rev. Mr. Friederich Schultz at Lunenburg. (Rev. Schultz was the first to serve in Lunenburg, erected the Zion Evangelical Lutheran Church in 1772 and stayed for 8 years.) After the position was vacant for two years, Schmeisser arrived in Lunenburg on 1 May 1782. Soon upon arriving in Lunenburg, Schmeisser, at age 31, began to court Sophia Biehler, age 25, the daughter of the master blacksmith, Wendel Wust.

He confronted the American invaders in the raid on Lunenburg and was subsequently tied up and left in the centre of town.

Three days after the raid on Lunenburg, on 3 July 1782, he married Sophia in the Zion Evangelical Lutheran Church (Lunenburg). They eventually had six children.

During his 24 years in Lunenburg he baptized 1729 children, confirmed 700 people and buried 380. He also wrote the sermon The Holy Communion: A Relic of the Past and an Instructor of the Present : Being a Sermon Written in the Year A.D. 1797.

He suffered an illness for 17 years and died on 21 December 1806 at age 55. He was buried with a gravestone in the Hillcrest Cemetery (Lunenburg, Nova Scotia).

== See also ==
- Nova Scotia in the American Revolution
