= Bernard Michael Houseal =

German minister in North America (1727–1799)

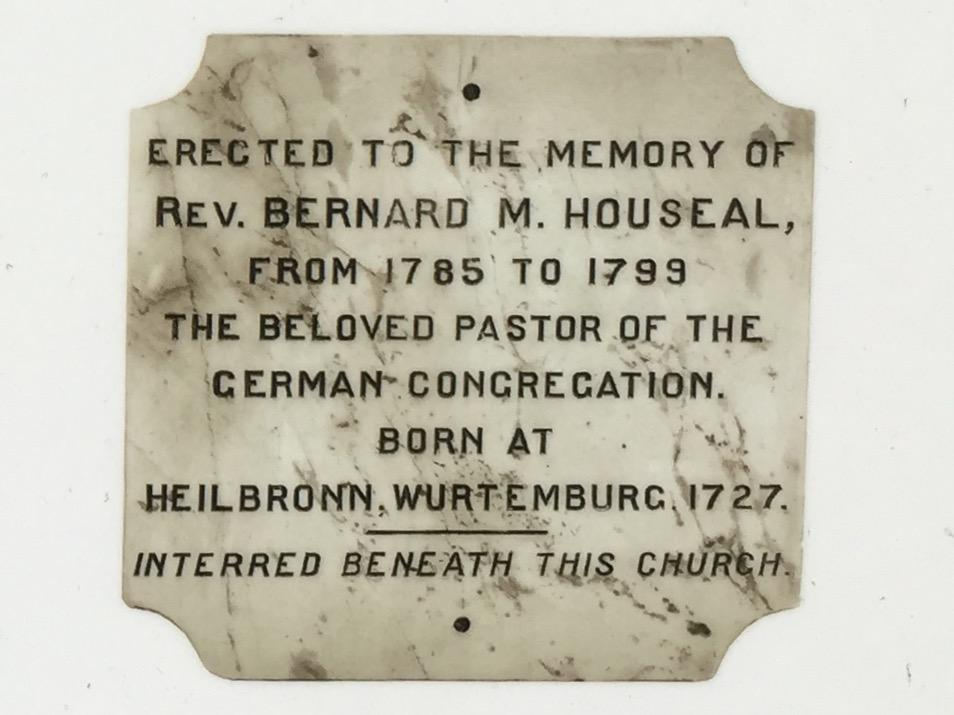
Rev Bernard Michael Houseal, Little Dutch (Deutsch) Church

Reverend Bernard Michael Houseal (German: Bernhard Michael Hausihl; 1727 in Heilbronn, Germany – 9 March 1799 in Halifax, Canada) was a German Lutheran minister in North America, and the first resident minister of Frederick, Maryland. He preached at the Evangelical Lutheran Church of Frederick, Maryland (1752) and was the first German minister of Little Dutch Church in Halifax, Nova Scotia. He was a Loyalist refugee who escaped New York with his family and slaves.

== Career ==
He was a student at the University of Strassburg. He married Sybilla Margaretha Mayer, daughter of Christopher Bartholomew Mayer, in the town of Ulm. They moved to Fredericktown, Maryland and established the Evangelical Lutheran Church (1752–1759). The building of the church was slowed as a result of the outbreak of the French and Indian War but was completed in 1762, before the war ended. Houseal stayed with the Church for seven years and then moved to Reading, Pennsylvania and served in the Trinity Lutheran Church (1759). After nine years, he went to Easton, PA (1768).

In 1770, he went to New York City where he was the Senior minister in the Trinity Lutheran Church. He became a Governor of New York College (present-day Columbia University) and a corporator of the New York Hospital. He was one of the addressers of Richard Howe, 1st Earl Howe. Houseal was an outspoken Loyalist and his house and church were burned by the rebels. After 14 years in New York City, he left for Nova Scotia as a Loyalist refugee (1784). Houseal stayed in New York City until the formal evacuation. Before he left the Vestry of Trinity church his congregation presented him with a letter that stated:

We the Subscribers, Members of the Vestry, Elders, Deacons and Trustees of the Antient Evangelical Trinity Church of the City of New York, for ourselves, and in behalf of our whole Congregation, do testify by these presents, that our hitherto beloved minister, the Reverend Bernard Michael Houseal, during his officiating here, for the space of nearly fourteen years ... And whereas the Lord of the Church has called the said our beloved minister to another Station in His Vineyard, we do cordially and thankfully wish and pray the God of all goodness may send His Blessings further with said Mr. Houseal ... with his beloved family to the place of their Destination, are the servant wishes of the Subscribers - New York, 18th November 1783.

During the first year Houseal was in Nova Scotia, he then went to London to be ordained in the Church of England (1785) and while preaching at the Savoy Chapel, Prince Edward requested he become chaplain of his regiment, after which they both came to Halifax. His son, Michael, served as the Duke of Kent's Aide-de-camp and was an author. Rev. Houseal's preaching was so popular that the congregation outgrew the Little Dutch Church and St. Georges Round Church was built. The Church was completed two years after Houseal died. Houseal is buried beneath the Little Dutch (Deutsch) Church (1799). After his death, Prince Edward arranged for his wife and children to live in England.

== Gallery ==
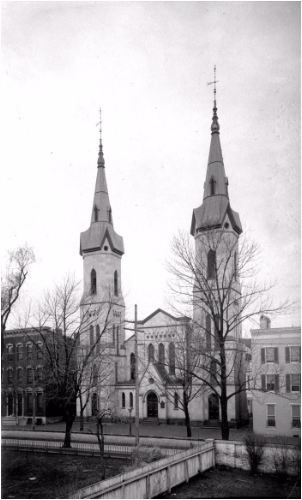
Rev. Houseal was the first minister in the Evangelical Lutheran Church (Frederick, Maryland) (1752–1759)

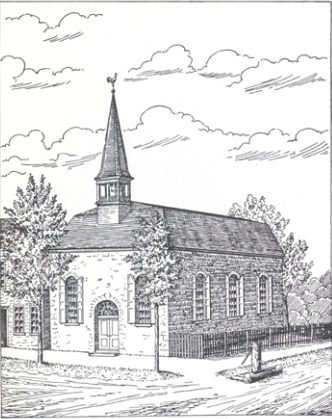
Rev. Houseal's church Trinity Church in New York City (1770–1783)

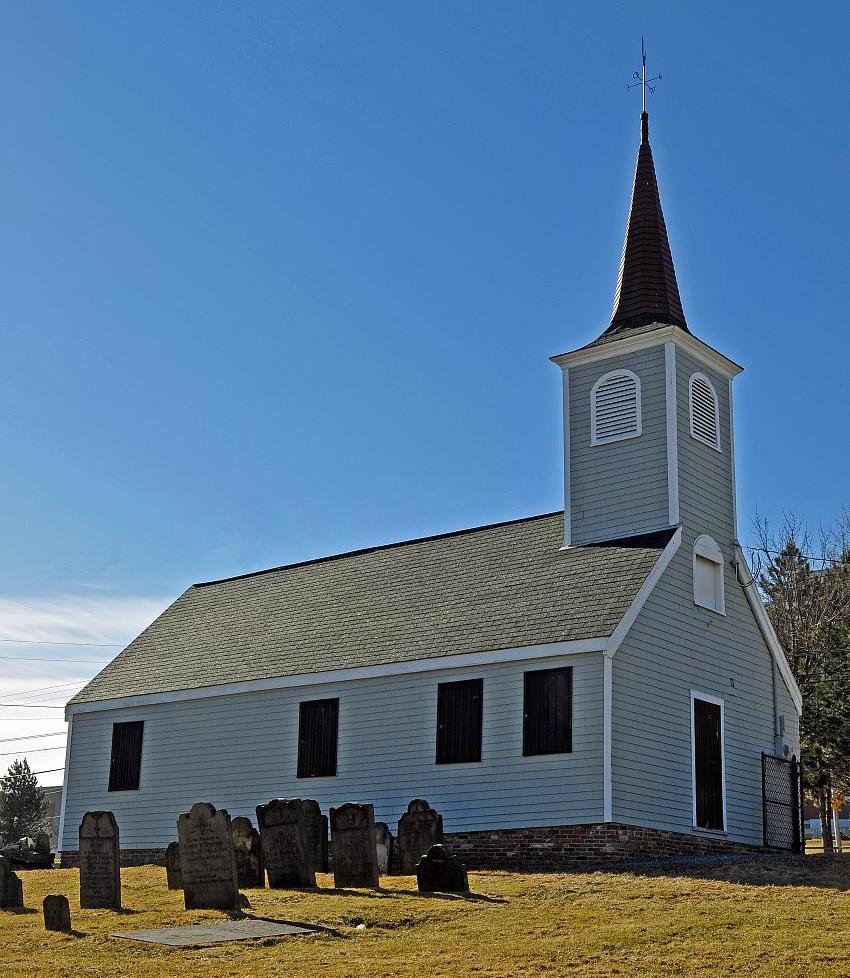
Little Dutch Church, Halifax, Nova Scotia (1784–1799)

== See also ==
- Nova Scotia in the American Revolution
