= Camp Norway =

Norwegian military training facility in Canada

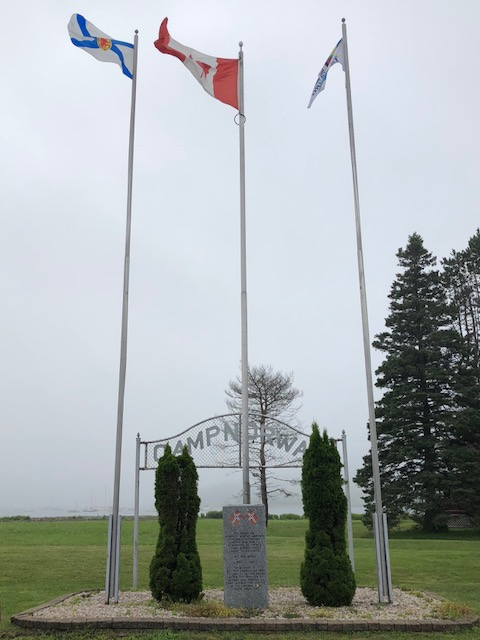
Camp Norway Monument, Lunenburg, Nova Scotia

Camp Norway was a Norwegian military training facility located in Lunenburg, Nova Scotia, Canada, during the Second World War.

== History ==
When Hitler invaded Norway, the Norwegian whaling ships were at sea and eventually got re-directed to Halifax. During the spring and summer of 1940, seven factory ships and 22 or 23 whale catchers with upwards of 2,000 men on board arrived in Halifax and anchored in Bedford Basin. After much negotiation, the Norwegian government was allowed to establish Camp Norway in Lunenburg. Camp Norway was opened on Friday, November 29, 1940, consisting of a training centre and barracks to house about 800 men. The buildings now owned by ABCO Industries.

At Camp Hill Cemetery in Halifax there are 17 graves of Norwegian sailors, soldiers and merchant seamen who died in Nova Scotia during World War II. At Hillcrest Cemetery (Lunenburg, Nova Scotia) there were four Norwegians buried.

== See also ==
- Military history of Nova Scotia

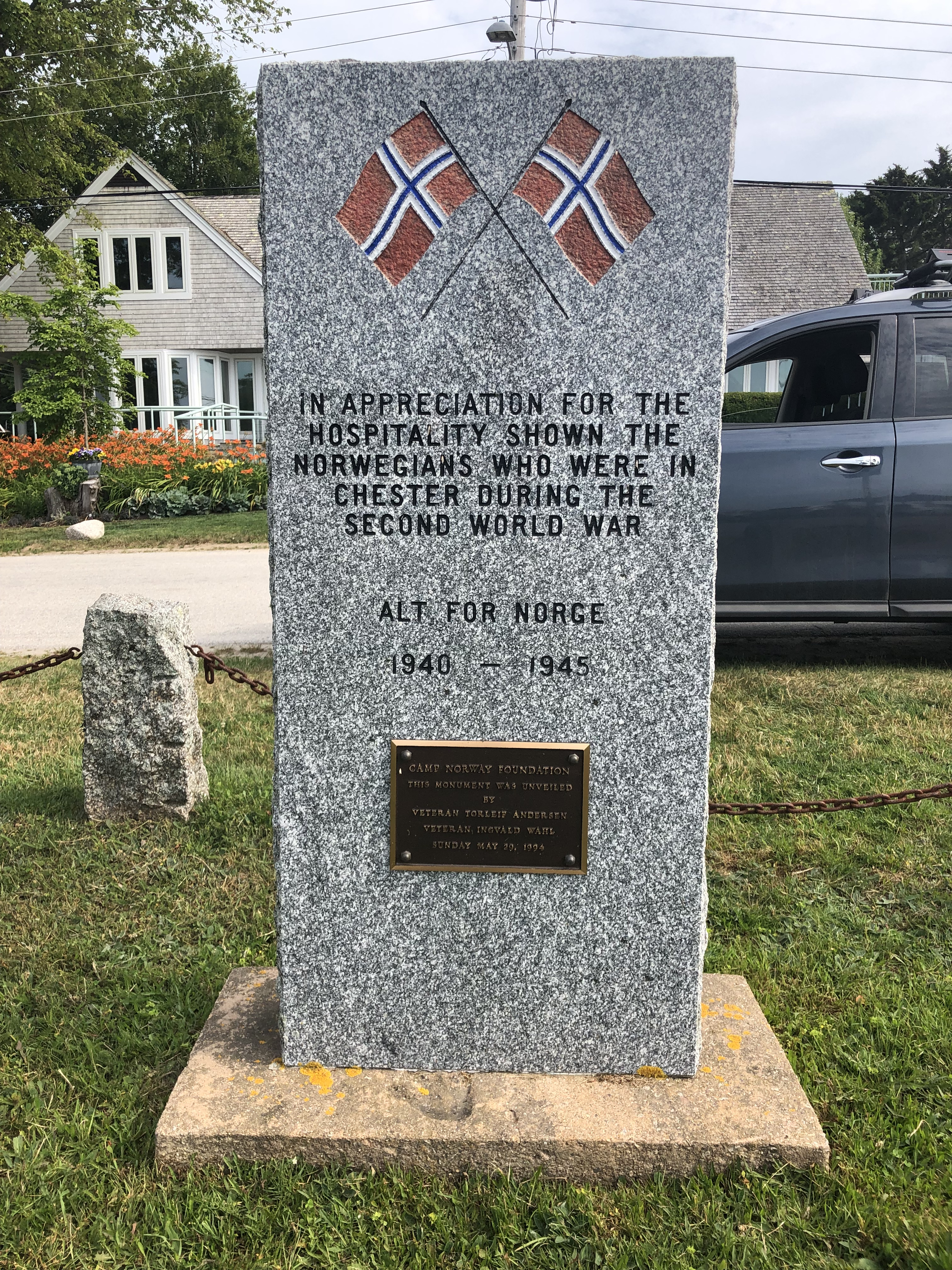
Camp Norway, Chester, Nova Scotia

== Links ==
- Camp Norway Monument
