= Little Dutch (Deutsch) Church =

Little Dutch Church
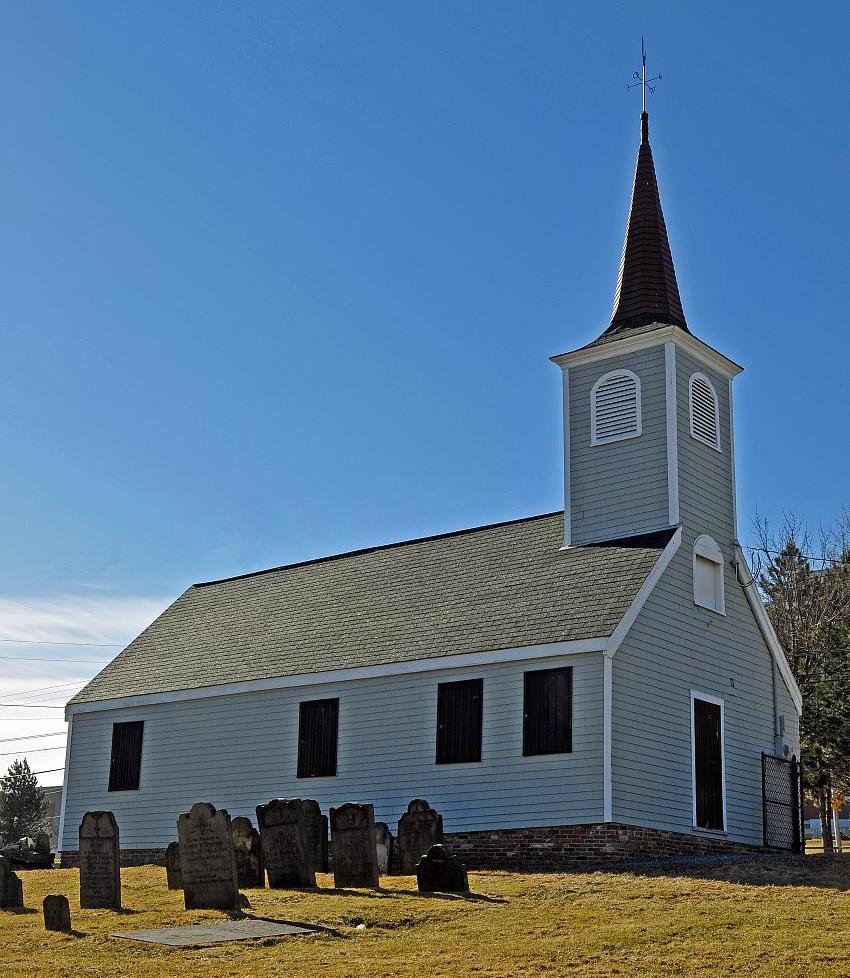
- Little Dutch Church
- 44°39′20.95″N 63°35′8.34″W
- Location: Halifax, Nova Scotia
- Country: Canada
- Denomination: Anglican (Lutheran traditions)

History
- Consecrated: 1760
- Events: 1760: steeple added

Architecture
- Groundbreaking: 1756

Administration
- Province: Canada

National Historic Site of Canada
- Official name: Little Dutch (Deutsch) Church National Historic Site of Canada
- Designated: 22 September 1997

Nova Scotia Heritage Property Act
- Type: Provincially Registered Property
- Designated: 27 October 1981
- Diocese: Nova Scotia and Prince Edward Island
- Parish: St. George

The Little Dutch (Deutsch) Church is the second-oldest building in Halifax, Nova Scotia, Canada, after St. Paul's Church. It was built for the Foreign Protestants, and is the oldest site in Canada associated with Lutheranism. It is a National Historic Site of Canada.

== History ==
The history of the church is associated with a community of "Foreign Protestants" (mostly German Palatines) who settled in the northern suburbs of Halifax between 1750 and 1752. The land the church sits on could have been set aside for their religious use as early as 1750, but construction of the church only took place several years later. This group of immigrants arrived in a Halifax which was beset by repeated epidemics, such as during a period from September 1749 to April 1750. In the latter part of 1750, "Foreign Protestants" landed in Halifax, raising its overall population to 3,200 by September. On September 2, a ship named the Ann arrived, carrying a number of ill and dying passengers. The health of the overall community began to deteriorate following the arrival of the Ann, marked by an abrupt increase in the number of burials. By October, Governor Edward Cornwallis had instituted quarantine measures to isolate the sick from the healthy. The epidemic eventually slowed and serious infectious disease would not arrive in the colony again until 1752. Paul B. Williams, who participated in the excavation and examination of remains later found at the church site, hypothesized in a 2003 article that the disease the migrants brought with them may have been typhus.

Coinciding with this epidemic, an estimated thirty individuals were buried in a mass grave on the grounds upon which the church would be built only a few years later. The dead were buried without grave goods or other personal effects. There is also little evidence that they were buried while clothed, though their clothing may have decayed; rope samples indicated that at least one individual may have been buried in sacking or a grave shroud. The trench containing the mass grave had been capped with large stones, which may have been to prevent its disturbance by animals. The grave was bounded by the later foundations of the church, perhaps indicating that the church had been purposefully erected above it.

Osteo-archaeological investigations conducted in the 1990s found that the individuals buried in the grave were of mixed sex and age, but a majority were adults. None of the bones showed signs of trauma or long-term health problems, likely indicating a cause of death which was fast-acting and only affected the soft tissue. The grave site was initially assumed to be exclusively that of Europeans, but it was later found that the skull of one individual was of a man in his twenties who may have been indigenous. While this was not conclusively determined, skull morphology indicated "characteristics more commonly associated with someone of aboriginal North American rather than of central-European or African origin," and distinctive wear patterns on the individual's teeth were similar to those of people eating a hunter-gatherer diet consisting of foods such as dried meats and seeds. This man's identity is unknown, but it has been speculated that he may have been a Mohawk. The parish of St. Paul's recorded the burial of a "Protestant Indian" named John Tray in 1750. There was also evidence of people with possible African ancestry in the mass grave, though this has also not been proven conclusively.

Not long after this, in 1756, the church was constructed. It was consecrated in 1760. The steeple, which was not an original part of the building, was added in 1760. Established by Otto William Schwartz, it is the oldest known surviving church in Canada associated with the German-Canadian community. It was an official chapel of St. Paul's Church. The church was used regularly until 1800, after which the expanding congregation migrated to the larger and newer St. George's "Round" Church a block to the south, and the church largely fell into disuse. The churchyard was used for burials until the mid-19th century, when this ceased due to public health concerns and the pressures of urbanization. In December 1896, repairs were made to the foundation, leading to the discovery of bones beneath the church by workmen. The bones were subsequently reburied in a separate pit, which was also uncovered during the later investigations.

A fire at St. George's Church in 1994 resulted in the Dutch Church being used regularly once again, leading to increased scrutiny of its structural condition. Concerns were raised about problems with its foundation, and a restoration project began. The project caught the attention of the government of Nova Scotia, and in 1996 an archaeological investigation was conducted which confirmed the 1896 discovery. A second, more full excavation occurred in 1998 following the laying of a new concrete foundation for the church. Following the completion of the archaeological work and analysis of the bones, the individuals were reburied in a new common grave in a multi-faith ceremony involving the Parish of St. George, descendants of the original German settlers, members of the German Canadian Association of Nova Scotia, and Mi'kmaq spiritual leaders.

In 1997, the Little Dutch Church was proclaimed a National Historic Site of Canada. Williams remarks that "[i]n the past, much of the attention of the Historic Sites and Monuments Board of Canada has been placed on the military and Anglo-French colonial narratives of Canadian nation building," and that the site helps to affirm a German heritage in Canada and provide a symbol of German-Canadian identity. However, he also raised concerns about the process as one which did not pay heed to archaeological and forensic discoveries on the site, and did not also include First Nations and Afro-Nova Scotian perspectives.

== Notable interments ==
Robert Fitzgerald Uniacke is buried in the cemetery and Major Leonard Lockman is buried beneath the Church where his monument remains.

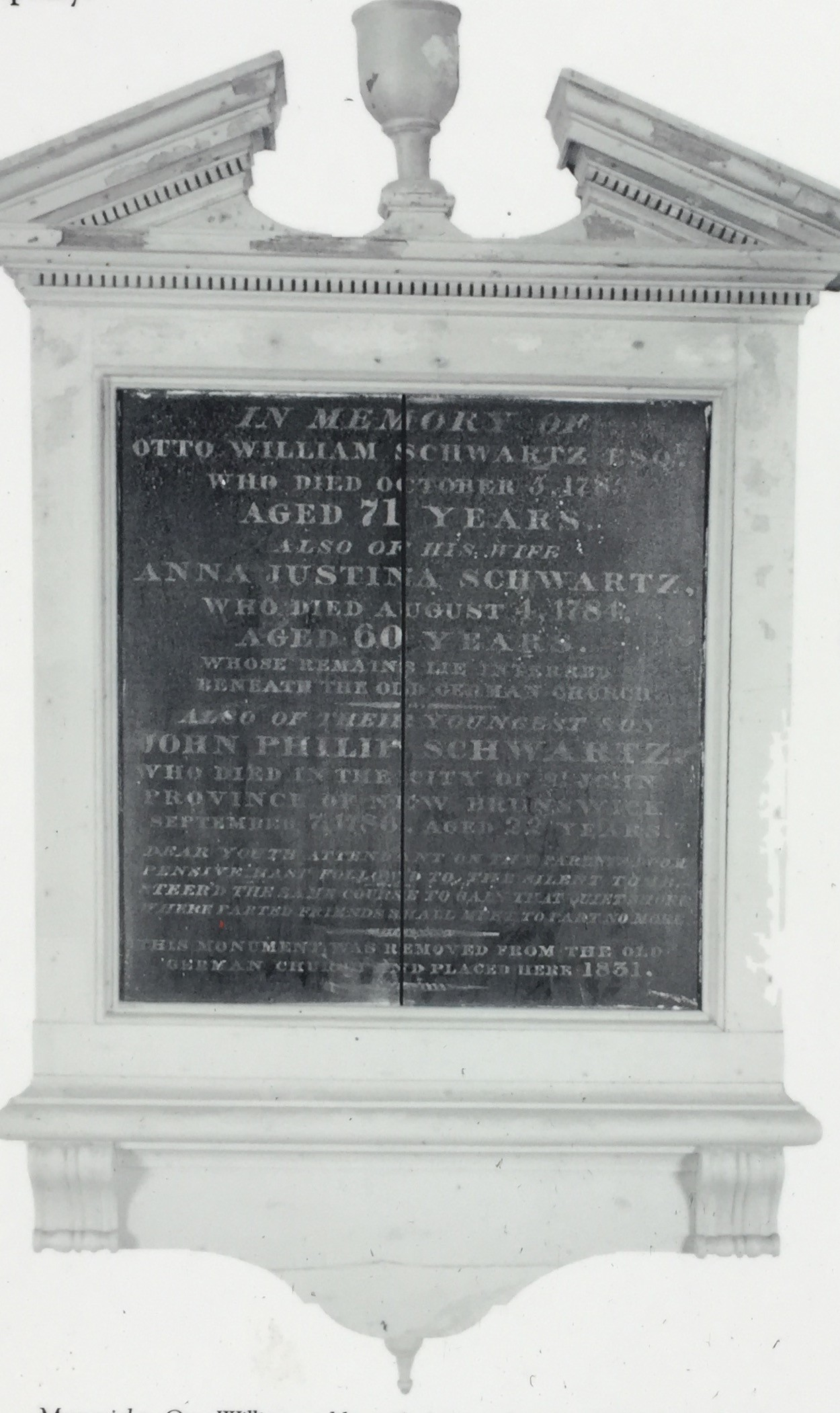
Otto William Schwartz (tablet removed to St. George's Round Church in 1831)

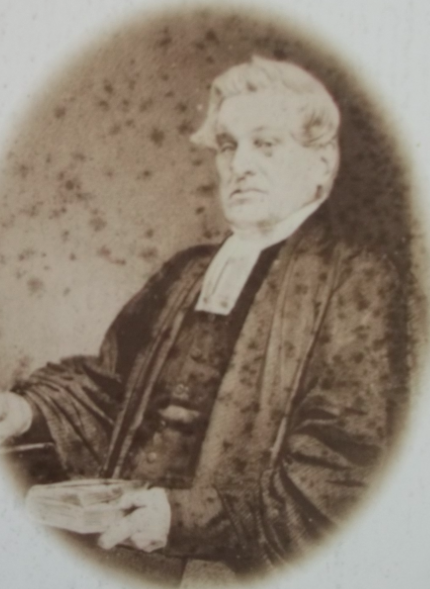
Robert Fitzgerald Uniacke

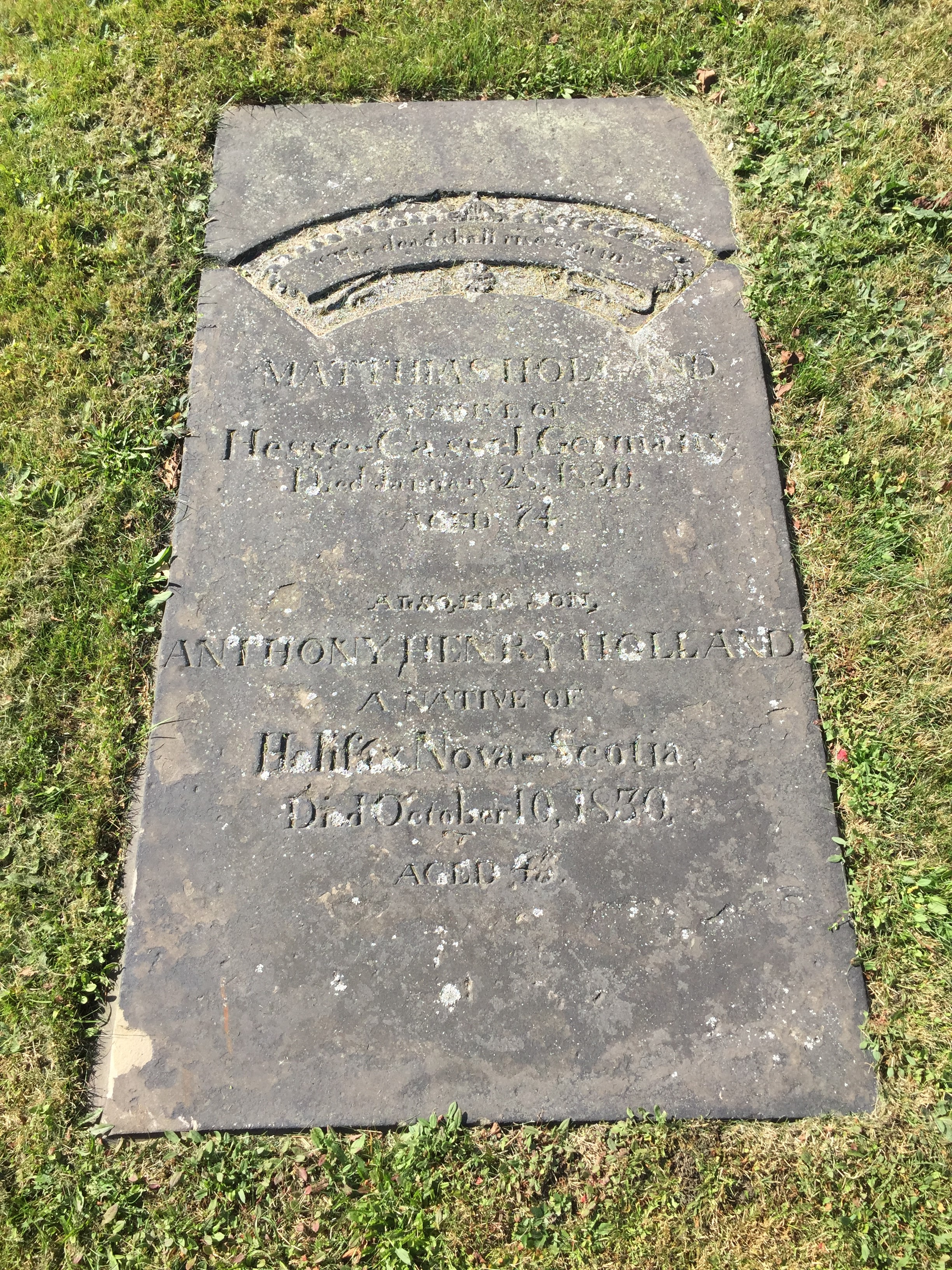
Johann Matthäus Holland, Hessian (soldier)

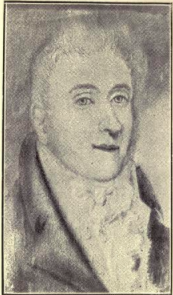
Anthony Henry Holland

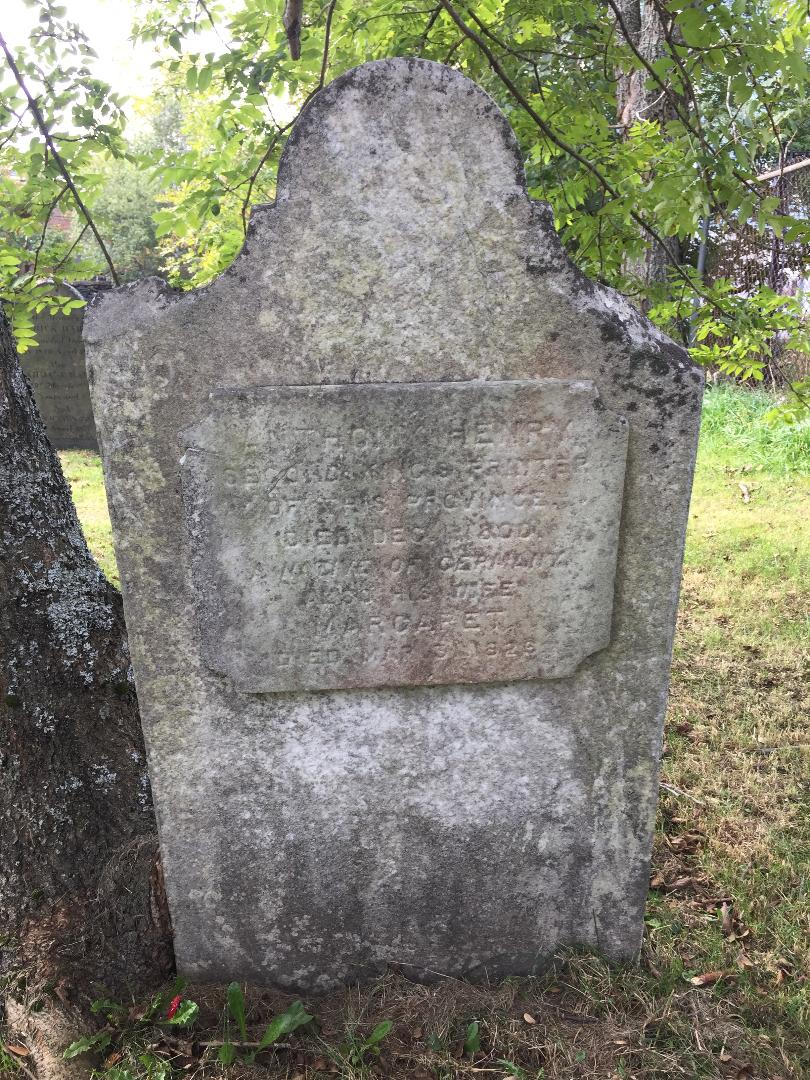
Anthony Henry (Printer)

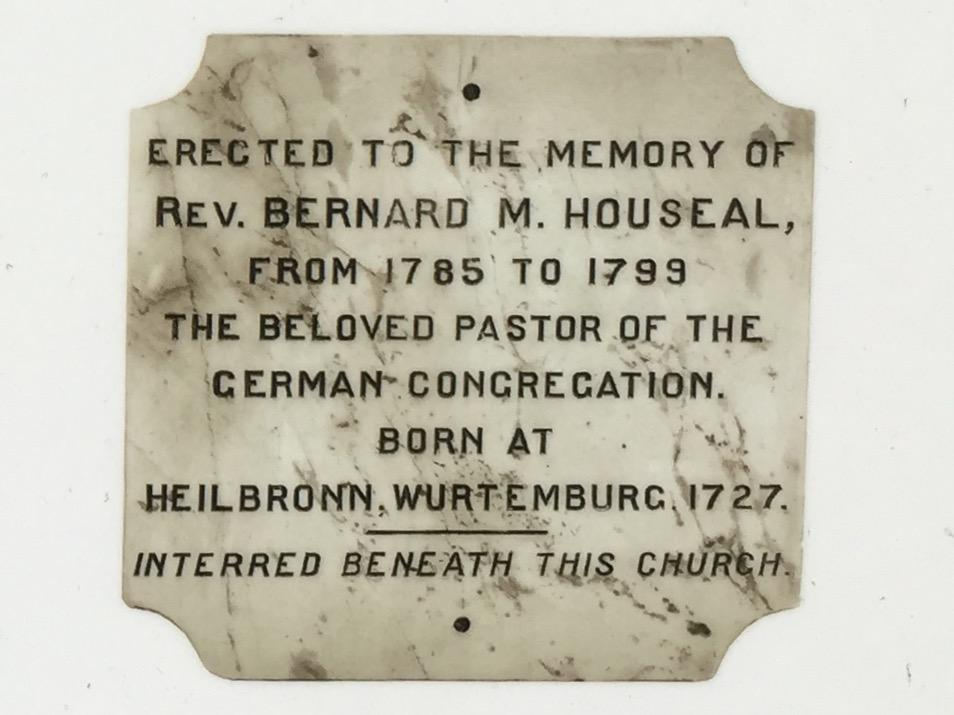
Rev Bernard Michael Houseal (Loyalist from New York; friend of Prince Edward)
- Major Leonard Lockman, namesake of Lockman St. (now Brunswick St.)
- Elliot and Ella, Children of Mark P Seward, 8th (The King's) Regiment of Foot
- Elizabeth, Wife of John Fraser, Surgeon, Nova Scotia Fencibles
- Johann Nikolaus Batz, Hessian (soldier), unmarked grave

== See also ==
- List of oldest buildings and structures in Halifax, Nova Scotia
- List of oldest buildings in Canada
- History of the Halifax Regional Municipality
- Zion Evangelical Lutheran Church (Lunenburg)
- Hillcrest Cemetery (Lunenburg, Nova Scotia)
- Old Burying Ground (Halifax, Nova Scotia)
