= Foreign Protestants =

18th-century group in Nova Scotia, Canada

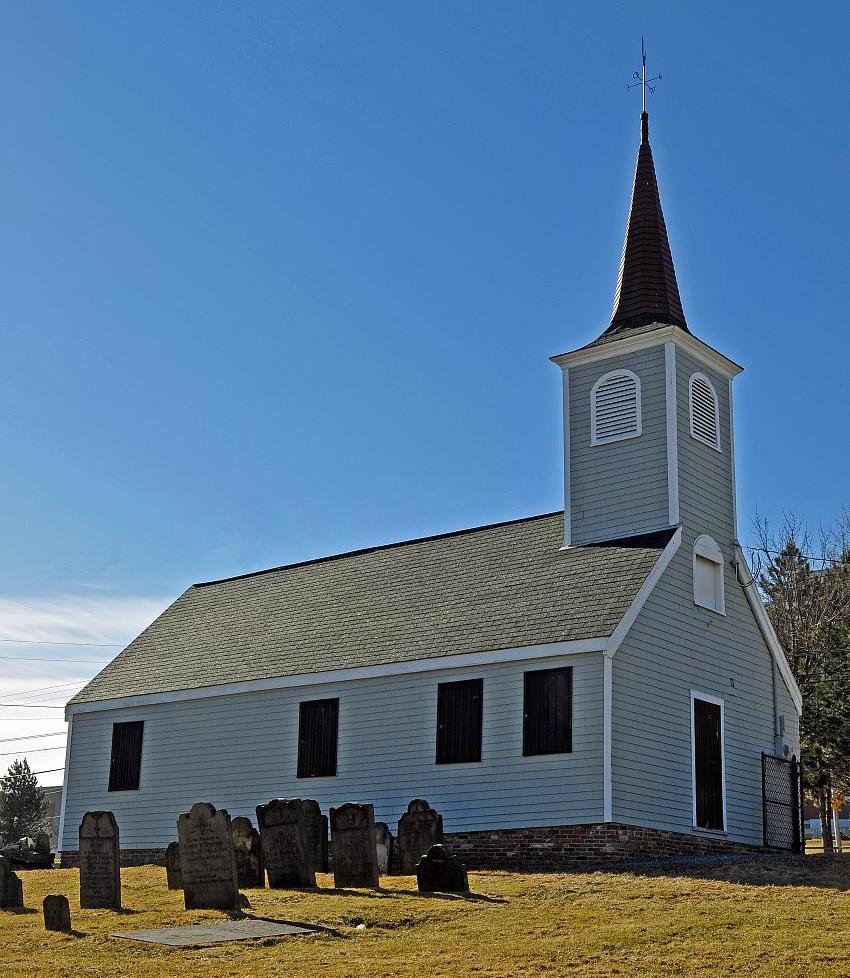
Little Dutch (Deutsch) Church, Halifax, Nova Scotia

The Foreign Protestants were a group of non-British Protestant immigrants to Nova Scotia, primarily originating from France and Germany. They largely settled in Halifax at Gottingen Street (named after the German town of Göttingen) and Dutch Village Road as well as Lunenburg.

== History ==
In 1749, the British colony of Nova Scotia was almost completely populated by native Mi'kmaq and 10,000 French-speaking and Roman Catholic Acadians. The British, specifically the Board of Trade, wanted to settle Protestants in the region. Attracting British immigrants was difficult since most preferred to go to the warmer southern colonies. Thus, a plan was developed to aggressively recruit foreign Protestants, who came mostly from German duchies and principalities on the Upper Rhine. The Duchy of Württemberg was the major source, which included the French region of Montbéliard, and there were also "Foreign Protestants" from what is now the tripoint of France, Germany and Switzerland.

The recruiting drive was led by John Dick, a recruiting agent for settlers in the New World. The British government agreed to provide free passage to the colony, free land, and one year of rations upon arrival. Over 2,000 of the "Foreign Protestants" arrived between 1750 and 1752, in 12 ships:

- Alderney (1750)
- Nancy (1750)
- Ann (1750)
- Gale (1751)
- Speedwell (1751)
- Pearl (1751)
- Murdoch (1751)
- Speedwell (1752)
- Betty (1752)
- Sally (1752)
- Pearl (1752)
- Gale (1752)

The immigrants disembarked at Halifax, where they were put in temporary quarters. The Foreign Protestants stayed at Halifax to assist the British in building the new outpost. They built their own chapel in Halifax, Little Dutch (Deutsch) Church. Issues arose as a number struggled with high rents in the "shanty town" they had to live in, as well as trouble accessing building materials and having to pay exorbitant prices, while they awaited their promised lands. Governor Hopson and his council had a large number of the Protestants removed and resettled in the Summer of 1753 to Merliguish/Merligash, renamed to Lunenburg, Nova Scotia.

Conditions in Lunenburg were initially quite poor and rumours that the people were not receiving all of the support authorized by the British Parliament resulted in the Lunenburg Rebellion in December 1753. The Foreign Protestants also faced numerous Mi'kmaw attacks, such as the Raid on Lunenburg (1756).

== Legacy ==
Most of the foreign Protestants settled along the South Shore between Liverpool and Halifax. The area is still inhabited by their descendants, and last names like, Rothenhauser (modern day spelling: Rhodenizer), Berghaus (anglicized to Barkhouse), Corkum, Creaser, Crouse, Ernst, Harnisch (anglicized to Harnish), Himmelman, Hebb, Hirtle (anglicized to Hartley), Lohnes, Joudrey, Kaiser, Koerber (anglicized to Carver), Knickle, Mariette (anglicized to Marriott), Mettetel (anglicized to Matatall), Morash, Naas, Petterquin (anglicized to Patriquin), Ramichen (anglicized to Romkey), Rehfus (anglicized to Rafuse), Reichert (anglicized to Richards), Schmidt (anglicized to Smith), Seeberger (anglicized to Seaboyer), Teubert (anglicized to Tibert), Vogler, Wenzel (anglicized to Wentzell), Whynacht (anglicized to Whynot), Weil (anglicized to Wile), Zinck, Zwicker. Many towns such as Lunenburg, bear distinctly German names. While places adapted to the cultural and business requirements including Bridgewater and Riverport. Many of the names of islands, beaches, and points like Kingsburg are also German.

In the mid-18th century, the Foreign Protestants were the ethnonymic basis behind the name "New Brunswick", as well as support behind naming "Prince Edward Island" for a representative of the Braunschweiger dynasty.

== Gallery ==
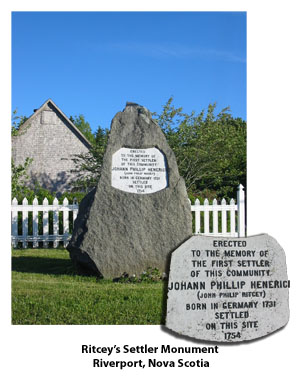
Johann Phillip Henericie's Monument, 1st European to settle Riverport, Nova Scotia

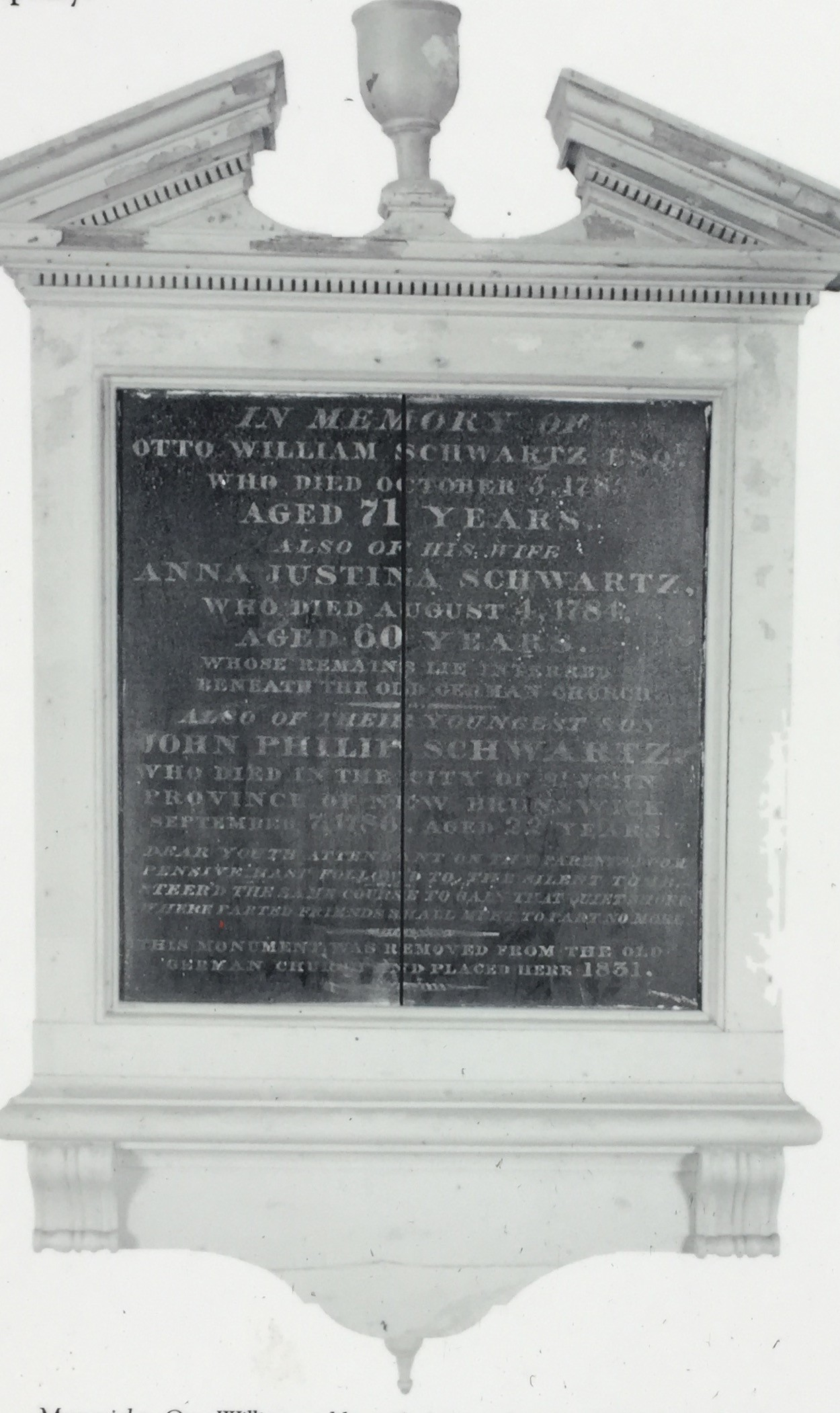
Otto William Schwartz

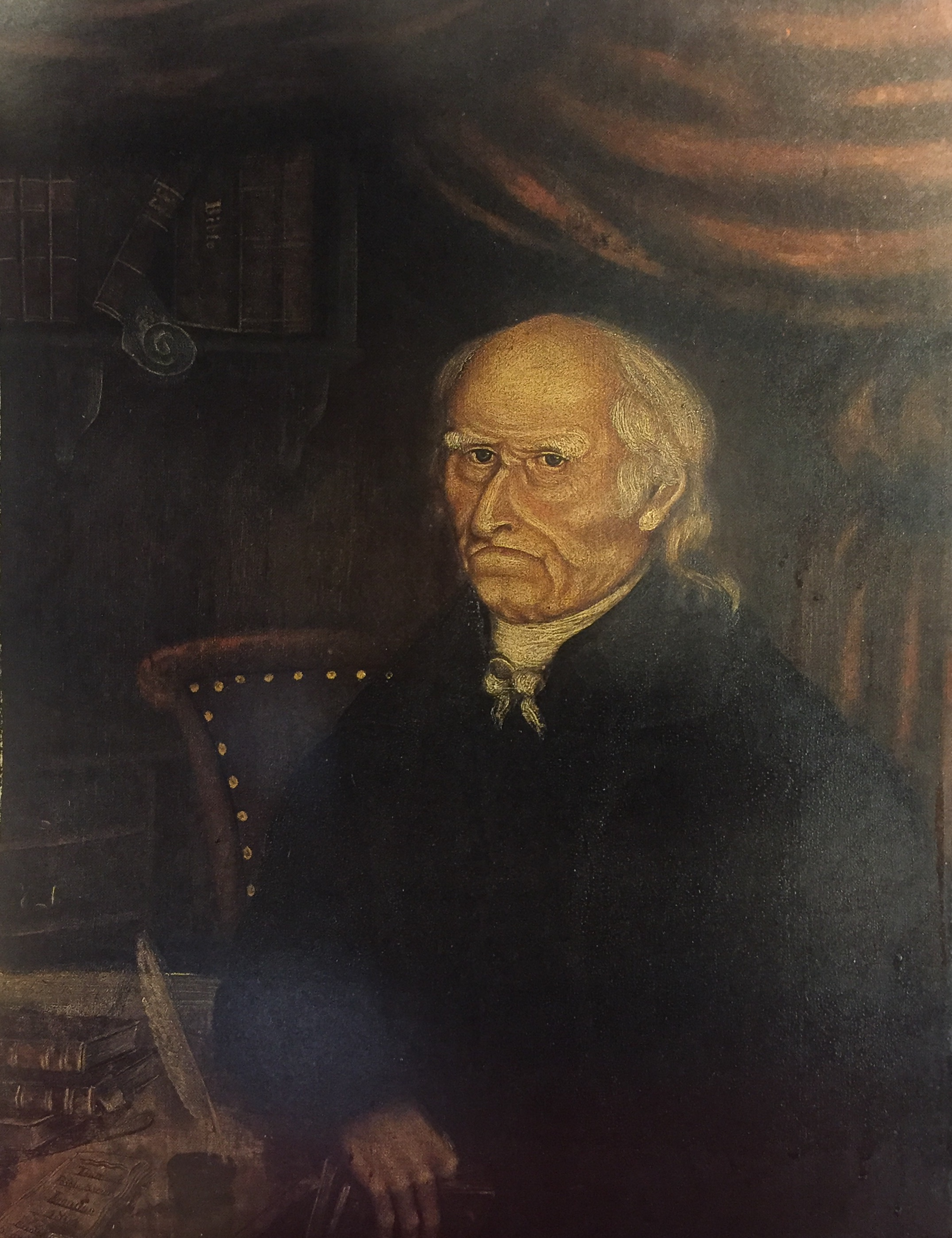
John Payzant (1749–1834) – taken captive for four years (age 6-10)

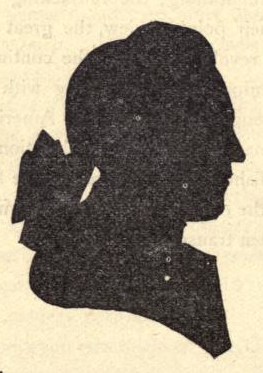
Johann Gottlob Schmeisser – earliest known image of Foreign Protestant in Nova Scotia (c.1790)

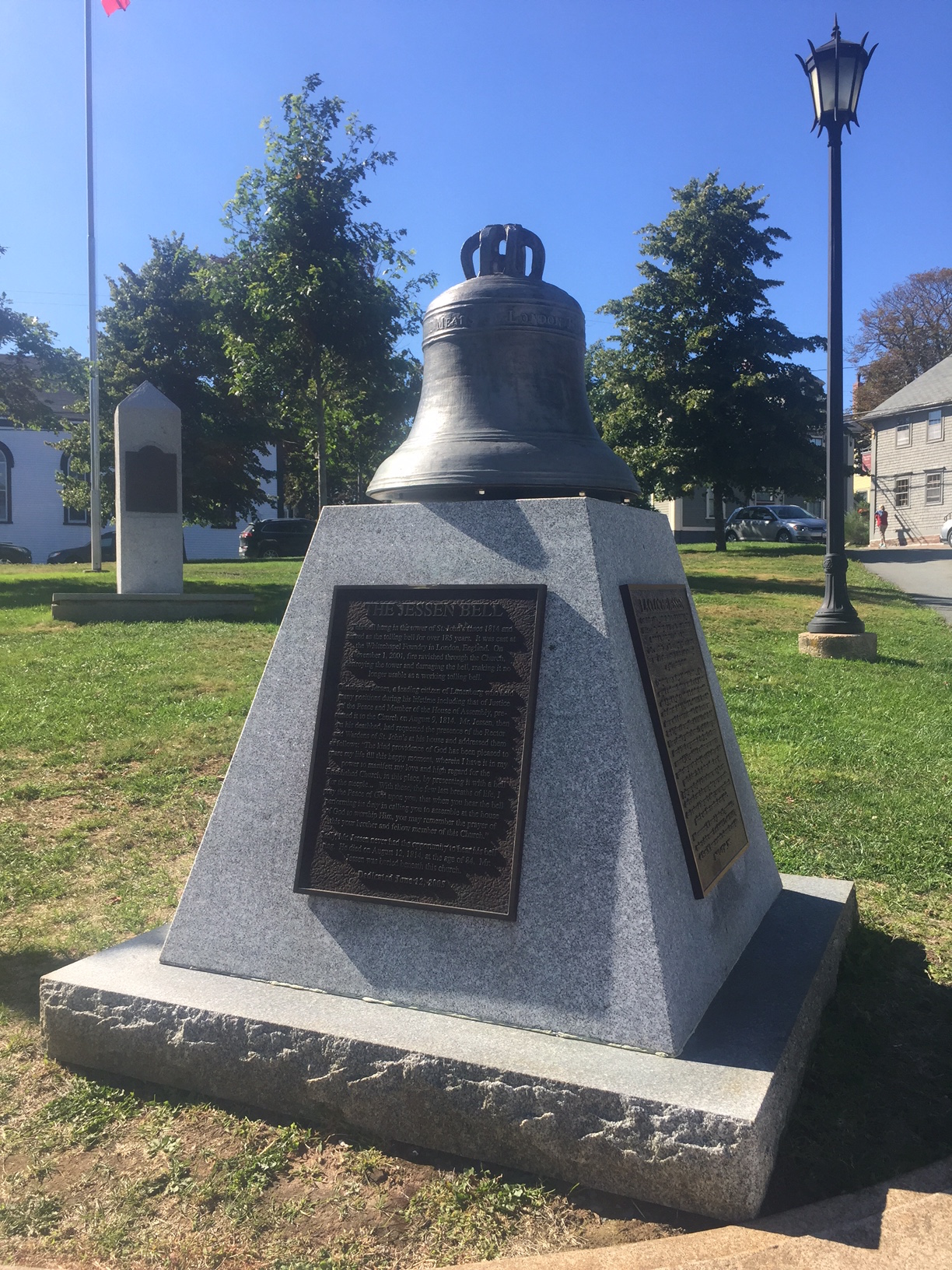
The Jessen Bell

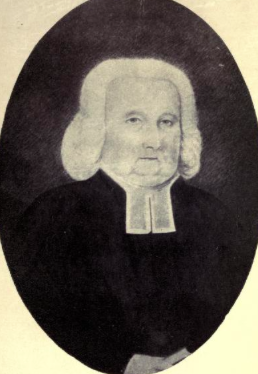
Rev Bruin Romkes Comingo, 1st Presbyterian minister ordained in Canada, St. Andrew's Presbyterian Church (Lunenburg)

== Notable Foreign Protestants ==
- Johann Gottlob Schmeisser
- Otto William Schwartz
- Dettlieb Christopher Jessen
- Joseph Pernette
- John Payzant

== See also ==
- Prince Rupert of the Rhine
- Hesse
- Foreign Protestants Naturalization Act 1708
- Huguenots

== Sources ==
- Bell, Winthrop Pickard. The "Foreign Protestants" and the Settlement of Nova Scotia:The History of a piece of arrested British Colonial Policy in the Eighteenth Century. Toronto: University of Toronto Press, 1961
- History of Bridgewater, NS
- History of Riverport District, NS
- The Foreign Protestants
- The Foreign Protestants
- Montbeliard Monument
