= Lunenburg Academy =

National Historic Site of Canada

- Académie de Lunenburg, Lunenburg Elementary School
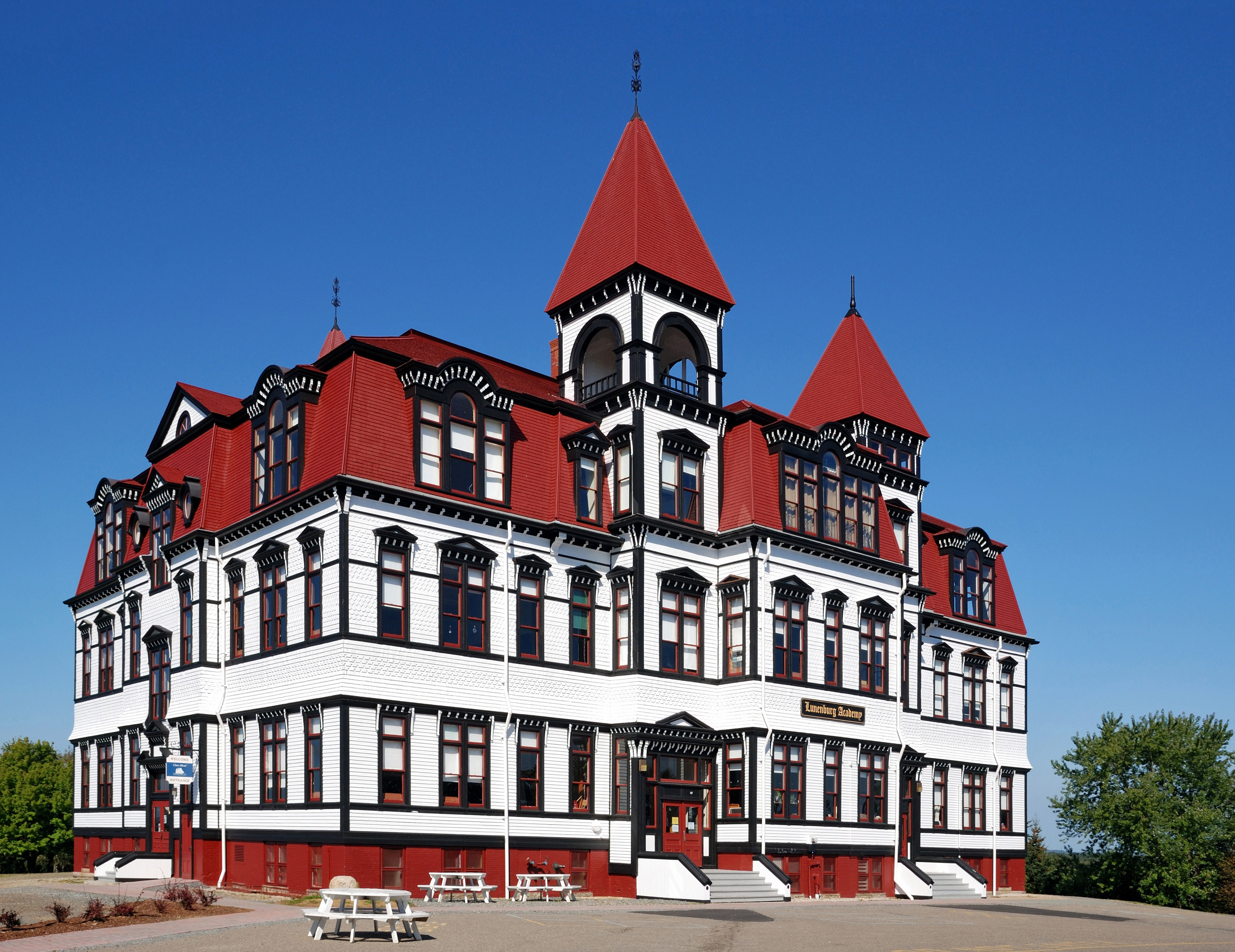
- The academy in 2008
- Interactive map of Lunenburg Academy
- Location: 101 Kaulback Street, Lunenburg, Nova Scotia
- Coordinates: 44°22′48″N 64°18′50″W
- Built: 1894–1895
- Architect: Harry H. Mott
- Architectural style: Second Empire architecture

National Historic Site of Canada
- Designated: 1983

The Lunenburg Academy is a historic school building located in Lunenburg, Nova Scotia. Constructed in 1895 to replace a building that had been destroyed by fire, the academy operated as a school from 1895 until 2012, when the Town of Lunenburg took over the property. It was designated a National Historic Site in 1983 for its distinctive Second Empire architectural features and its illustration of Nova Scotia's education system in the 19th century. As of 2019, the building houses a library and music school, and restoration efforts are ongoing.

== History ==
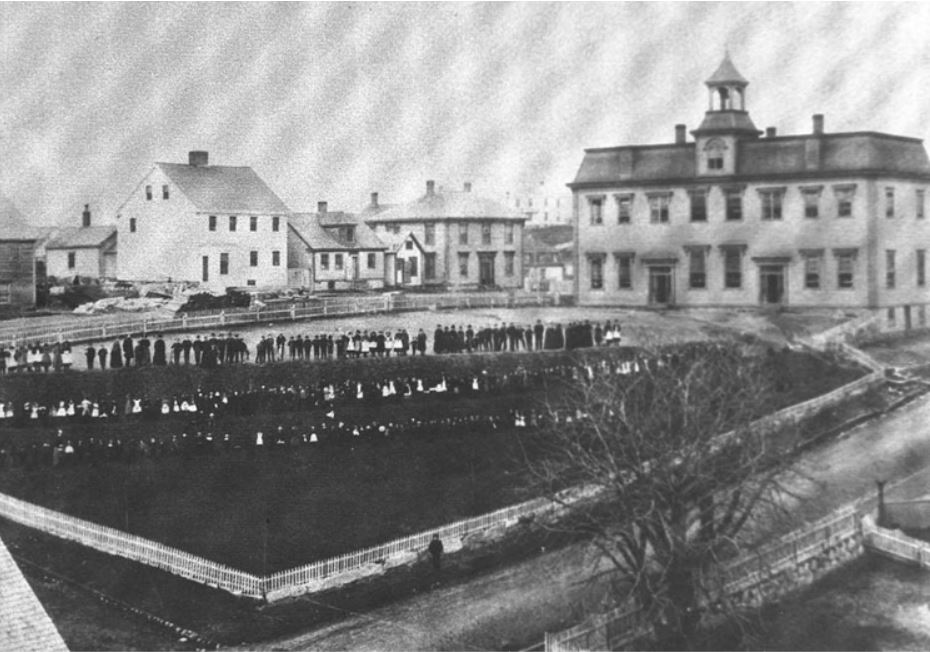
The old academy, which was destroyed in 1893

After the county academy was destroyed by fire in 1893, the town of Lunenburg set out to create a new building which would be "an ornament to the town and a credit to the Province". As the old academy, which housed only 200 students, had reached its capacity, the new building was planned to be much larger. Construction of the Lunenburg Academy, directed by architect Harry H. Mott, began in the fall of 1894 and was completed in 1895. The school opened on November 7, 1895, admitting more than 650 students. The academy served as a primary and secondary school for students in Lunenburg County until 1966, when it became strictly a school for grades primary to nine. It continued to operate as a school until March 2012, when concerns over maintenance costs led the school board to cede operations to the town. The Lunenburg Academy was designated a National Historic Site in 1983, owing to its architectural heritage and its illustration of the 19th century academy system in Nova Scotia.

A large-scale restoration project is ongoing as of August 2019. The project aims to convert the building into a mixed-use structure with community and office spaces. The building currently hosts the Lunenburg Library, which opened in 2018, and the Lunenburg Academy of Music Performance. Some of the former classrooms are rented to businesses and organizations.

== Architecture ==
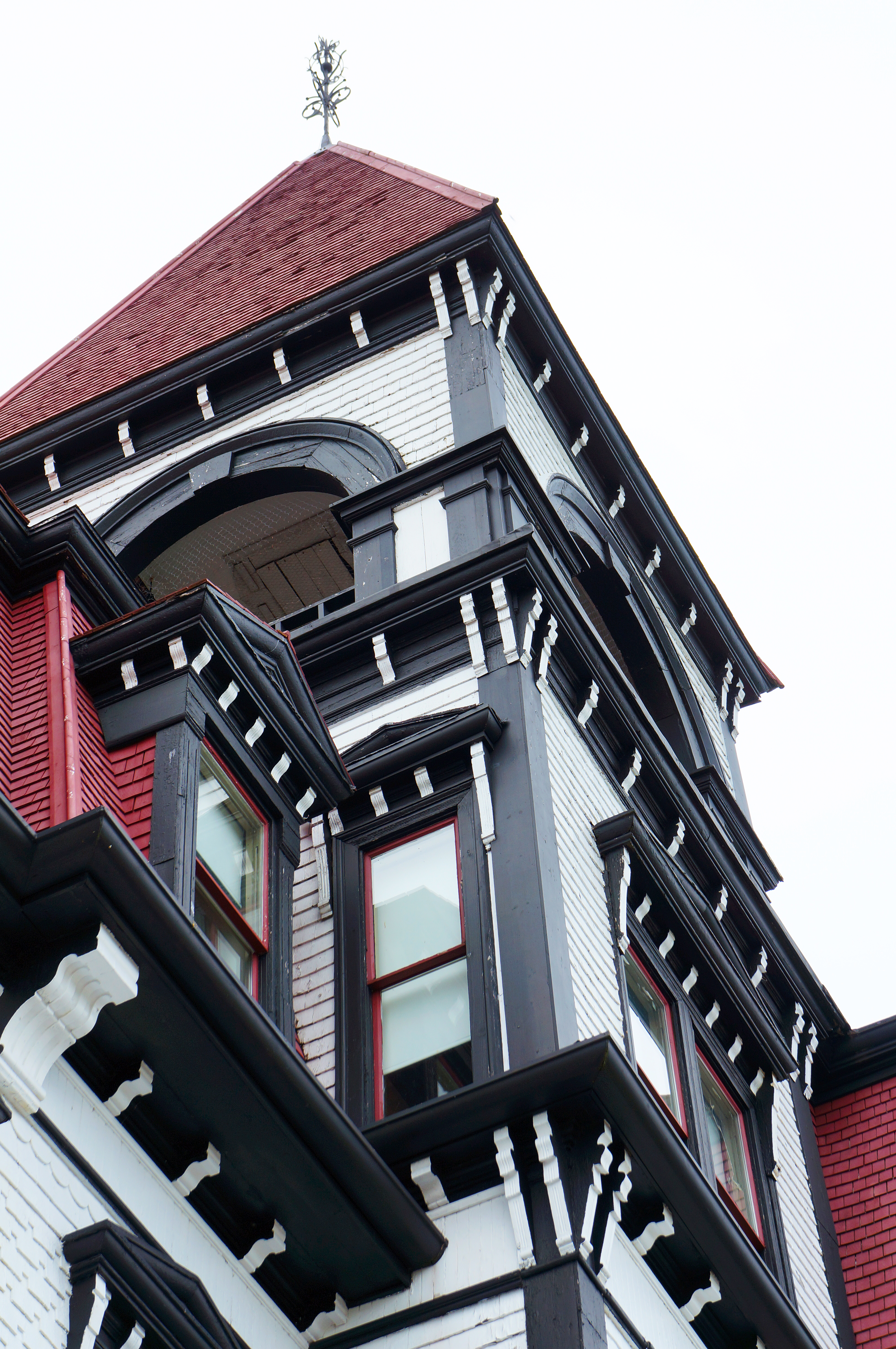
Exterior details

=== Exterior ===
The three-storey wooden building is located on a 3.7 acre (1.5 ha) lot atop Gallows Hill at 101 Kaulback Street, adjacent to the Old Town Lunenburg Historic District. Due to its size and elevation, the structure is visible when approaching the town from most directions. It sits on a granite block foundation topped with brick and is designed in the Second Empire style, with a mansard roof, large central chimney, Oriel and Venetian windows, and towers capped with pyramidal roofs. The central tower houses a large school bell. The exterior was originally yellow and brown, but was painted white, red, and black after World War II. It is ornamented with horizontal belt coursing, intricate bracketing, and pediments over windows and doors. Margaret Atwood described the building as "an extraordinary mansard-roofed construction... a sort of Charles Addams nightmare, only white".

=== Interior ===
The building's area is approximately 18,000 square feet (1,700 m^{2}). Much of the interior remains unchanged from its original structure. Mott's interior plans included a heating system in the basement consisting of six air furnaces, with the upper levels housing classrooms of approximately equal size, arranged in an asymmetrical pattern to optimize natural lighting. The two main entrances of the building were for boys, the others for girls; there were separate staircases for each gender, and there was no main foyer, so that male and female students could not mix outside of the classrooms.

The furnace system was replaced with radiators in the 1950s. During the 1980s, the third floor was closed due to fire safety concerns; it was reopened after a rehabilitation project that took place from 1998 to 2000. Bathrooms and kitchens have been installed on each floor, and fire doors and glass panelling have been added to the stairwells, but the wooden stairs and banisters have been preserved. The original hardware, and ornamental detailing such as wooden wainscoting, survives, and some of the original light fixtures are still in place.
