= Promulgation =

Act of formally declaring a new law after its enactment

Promulgation is the formal proclamation or the declaration that a new statutory or administrative law is enacted after its final approval. In some jurisdictions, this additional step is necessary before the law can take effect.

After a new law is approved, it is announced to the public through the publication of government gazettes and/or on official government bulletins. National laws of extraordinary importance to the public may be announced by the head of state or head of government on a national broadcast. Local laws are usually announced in local newspapers and published in bulletins or compendia of municipal regulations.

== Jurisdiction-specific details ==
=== Albania ===
Laws are passed by the Parliament of Albania and sent to the president to be promulgated (Albanian: dekretim). Upon promulgation, they are published in the Official Journal (Fletorja Zyrtare), alongside the presidential decree promulgating it. Laws usually enter into force 15 days after promulgation.

The president has up to 20 days to promulgate a law. Otherwise, the law is automatically promulgated. The president can also choose to issue a decree requesting the Parliament to reconsider a law. Reconsideration can only be requested once, and can be overcome by an absolute majority of the Parliament.

The president can choose to grant, upon a request from an absolute majority of the Parliament, immediate entry into force for a law in cases of urgency or emergency. In all cases, the law must be published in the Official Journal before it is binding.

=== Armenia ===
Bills are enacted by the president of Armenia and published in the Official Gazette of Armenia.

=== Belgium ===
Statutes are promulgated by the king of the Belgians and published in the Belgian Official Journal. Decrees and ordinances are promulgated by the different regional and community governments and published in the Belgian Official Journal.

=== Canada ===
Canadian federal acts of Parliament, orders in council, proclamations, public notices, official appointments and proposed regulations from the Government of Canada are promulgated in the Canada Gazette (French: Gazette du Canada). The Canada Gazette consists of three parts that are published separately. Part 1 promulgates public notices, official appointments and proposed regulations; Part 2 promulgates regulations; and Part 3 promulgates Acts of Parliament. Each province and territory has its own publication in which their laws, regulations, and other statutory instruments are promulgated.

Province	Publication
Alberta	The Alberta Gazette
British Columbia	The British Columbia Gazette
Manitoba	The Manitoba Gazette / Gazette du Manitoba
New Brunswick	The Royal Gazette / Gazette royal
Newfoundland and Labrador	The Newfoundland and Labrador Gazette
Northwest Territories	Northwest Territories Gazette / Gazette des Territoires du Nord-Ouest
Nova Scotia	Royal Gazette: Part I; Part II
Nunavut	Nunavut Gazette / Gazette du Nunavut
Ontario	The Ontario Gazette / La Gazette de l'Ontario
Prince Edward Island	Royal Gazette
Quebec	Gazette officielle du Québec: Partie 1—Avis juridiques; Partie 2—Lois et règlements; Part 2—Laws and Regulations
Saskatchewan	The Saskatchewan Gazette
Yukon	The Yukon Gazette / La Gazette du Yukon

=== Canon law (Catholic Church) ===
A canonical law issued by the pope (or with his consent in the case of laws issued by an ecumenical council or congregation) is promulgated when it is published in Acta Apostolicae Sedis, and by default has the force of law three months after promulgation. Laws issued by bishops and particular councils are promulgated in various ways but by default take effect one month after promulgation.

According to canon 7 of the 1983 Code of Canon Law, Lex instituitur cum promulgatur ("A law is instituted when it is promulgated"). This is an ancient provision in Latin Church canon law, dating in its plural form to the Latin formulation of the great 12th century codifier of canon law, Gratian: Leges instituuntur cum promulgantur ("Laws are instituted when they are promulgated").

=== France ===
The president of France promulgates law (he may ask Parliament to reconsider the law, but only once).

=== Germany ===
The president of Germany has the duty to duly promulgate and issue laws, unless the president deems them "evidently unconstitutional". The question to what degree they must be convinced of the constitutional violation to deny promulgation is hotly debated.

=== Hong Kong ===
Bills have to be signed and promulgated by the chief executive, and be announced by the government in the gazette.

=== Hungary ===
Legislative proposals adopted by the National Assembly obtain the force of law only after they are signed by the president of the republic and published in the official gazette Magyar Közlöny.

=== India ===
If at any time the Indian Parliament is not in session, the president of India, on the recommendation of the Union Cabinet, may promulgate an ordinance, which will have the same effect as an act of Parliament. However, such ordinance will be presented before the parliament for final approval. They can only be issued when Parliament is not in session. They enable the Indian government to take immediate legislative action. Ordinances cease to operate either if Parliament does not approve of them within six weeks of reassembly, or if disapproving resolutions are passed by both houses. It is also compulsory for a session of Parliament to be held within six months.

=== Republic of Ireland ===
All laws passed by the Oireachtas are promulgated by a notice in the Iris Oifigiúil published by the president of Ireland, as required by the Constitution of Ireland.

=== Isle of Man ===
By ancient custom an act of Tynwald, the legislature of the island, did not come into force until it had been "promulgated" at an open-air sitting of Tynwald, usually held on Tynwald Hill at St John's on St John's Day (24 June) but since the adoption of the Gregorian calendar in 1753 on 5 July (or on the following Monday if 5 July is a Saturday or Sunday). Promulgation originally consisted of the reading of the act in English and Manx, but after 1865 the reading of the title of the act and a summary of each section were sufficient. This was reduced in 1895 to the titles and a memorandum of the object and purport of the act, and since 1988 only the short title and a summary of the long title have been read. An emergency procedure enabling an act to come into force on royal assent being announced at an ordinary sitting of Tynwald, subject to its being promulgated within 12 months, was introduced in 1916; since 1976 this has been the 'default' procedure, and since 1988 an act ceases to have effect unless promulgated within 18 months after royal assent is announced in Tynwald.

=== Italy ===
The president of the republic promulgates law. The president remands a law to the Chambers of Parliament, with an explanation, and asks for reconsideration—but must promulgate the law if it is re-approved without modification.

=== Japan ===
The emperor of Japan promulgates laws passed by the Diet. The emperor cannot refuse to promulgate a law.

=== Kenya ===
Promulgation is performed by the president.

=== Luxembourg ===
Article 34 of the constitution of Luxembourg requires the grand duke or duchess to promulgate a new law for it to take effect.

=== Macau ===
Bills have to approved by the Legislative Assembly, signed and promulgated by the chief executive. They must be published in the Official Gazette Boletim Oficial.

=== Malta ===
When a bill is approved by the House of Representatives of Malta, it is presented to the president of Malta for his assent. According to constitutional obligation he shall without delay signify that he assents and hence promulgate the said bill into a parliamentary act. The parliamentary act is then published in the Malta Government Gazette, and thus comes into force.

=== Mexico ===
A law is approved by Congress, signed by the president, and published in the Official Diary of the Federation (Spanish: Diario Oficial de la Federación), or DOF. Each law in its Transitional Articles (Transitorios) states when the law takes effect (entra en vigor) and, when applicable, what law it cancels and replaces. Regulations are prepared by the executive branch in order to establish the administration of the law. They are signed by the president and published in the DOF.

=== Poland ===
Laws have to be promulgated by the president of the republic in the Dziennik Ustaw journal. The president may refer to the Constitutional Tribunal; if he has not made reference, he may refer the bill to the Sejm (veto) for further reconsideration. The bill shall then be promulgated.

=== Portugal ===
The laws (statutes issued by the Parliament) and the decree-laws (statutes issued by the Government) have to be promulgated by the president of Portugal to take effect. The promulgation is the act by which the president solemnly testifies the existence of a rule of law and intimates its observation. The president may, however, decide not to promulgate the bill and to veto it with a political or legal justification. After the promulgation, the statutes are published in the Diário da República (official journal), with the laws needing a government referendum before.

=== Romania ===
Bills have to be promulgated by the president and afterwards published in the official gazette, Monitorul Oficial.

=== Spain ===
Article 91 of the Spanish Constitution establishes that bills, upon being passed by the Cortes Generales, must be sanctioned (i.e., given royal assent) by the king of Spain within two weeks of their passing. The king will then promulgate and immediately publish them in the official gazette, the Boletín Oficial del Estado.

=== Sweden ===
Laws and secondary legislation are promulgated by the Government of Sweden and are published in the Swedish Code of Statutes (Swedish: Svensk författningssamling).

=== Turkey ===
Bills are promulgated by the president of the republic and published in the official gazette, Resmi Gazete.

=== United Kingdom ===
Acts of Parliament in the United Kingdom are promulgated when given royal assent by the king. The sovereign may appear personally in the House of Lords or may appoint Lords Commissioners, who announce that royal assent has been granted at a ceremony held at the Palace of Westminster for this purpose. However, royal assent is usually granted less ceremonially by letters patent.

=== United States ===
Acts of Congress are given the force of law, in one of the following ways: signed by the president of the United States; neither signed nor vetoed by the president within ten days from reception (excluding Sundays) while the Congress is in session; or, when both the Senate and the House of Representatives vote, by a two-thirds majority in each chamber, to override a presidential veto during its session. In United States administrative law, a federal regulation may be said to be formally promulgated when it appears in the Federal Register and after the public-comment period concludes.

Amendments to the United States Constitution attain force of law "when ratified by the legislatures of three fourths of the several states, or by conventions in three fourths thereof, as the one or the other mode of ratification may be proposed by the Congress". When the requisite number of state ratifications has been reached (currently 38), it is the duty of the archivist of the United States to issue a certificate proclaiming a particular amendment duly ratified and part of the Constitution.
