= Henry Dugwell Blackadar =

Nova Scotia newspaper editor and publisher

Henry Dugwell Blackadar (6 February 1845 – 21 July 1901) was a newspaper editor and publisher from Halifax, Nova Scotia.

Blackadar is best known for his work with the Acadian Recorder, a newspaper founded in 1813 by Anthony Henry Holland. He carried on work of his father, Hugh William Blackadar.
