= Executive Instruments of the Government of India =

In the Republic of India, Executive Instruments refer to the various tools, orders, rules, and directives issued by the executive branch of the government (comprising the President, the Prime Minister, the Union Cabinet, and various Ministries and Departments) to administer the state, implement laws, and manage public policy.

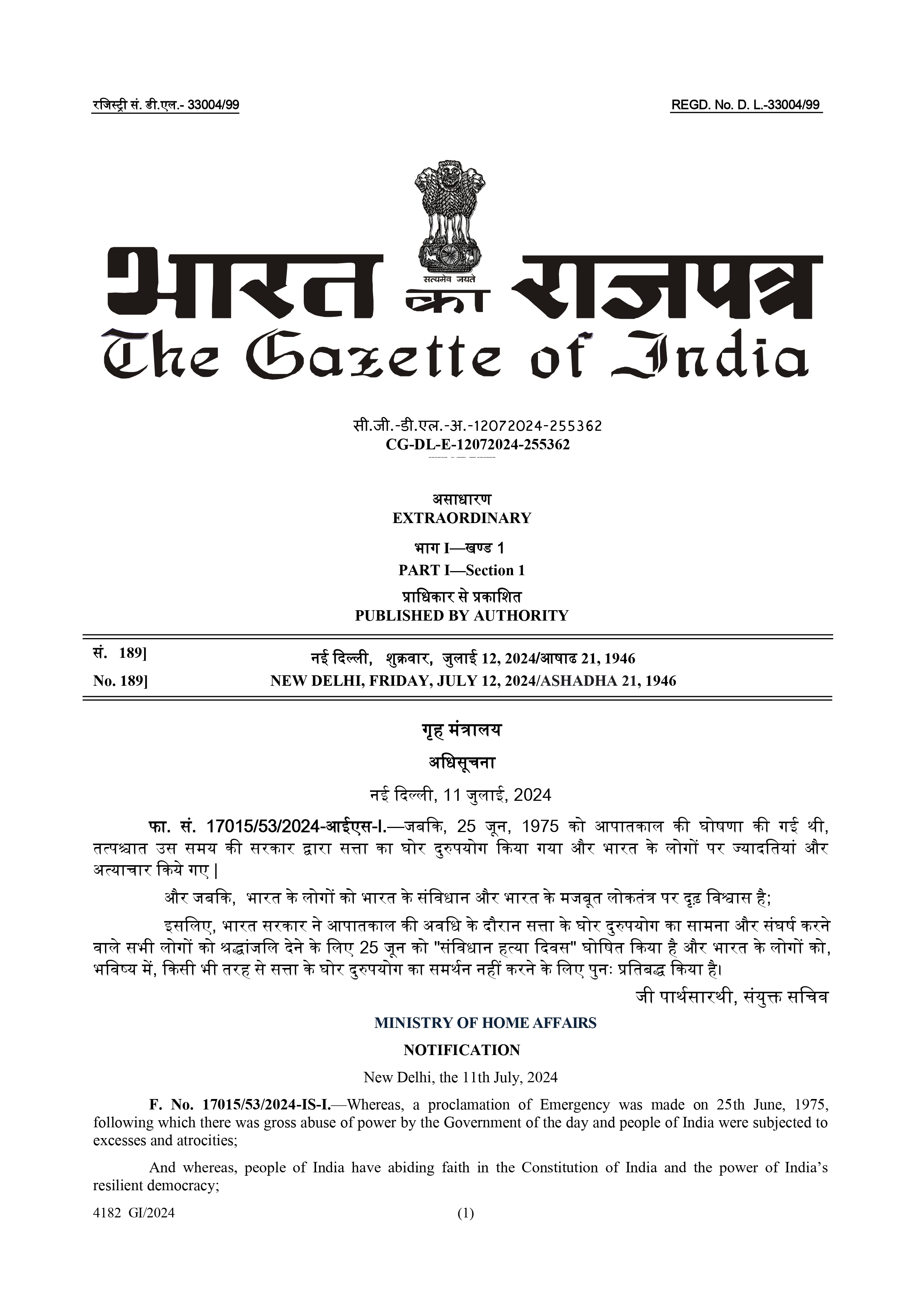
An example of Gazette Notification

Because India operates under a parliamentary system, the primary law-making power rests with the Parliament of India. However, due to the volume and technical complexity of modern governance, Parliament frequently delegates authority to the executive branch to formulate detailed rules and operational procedures. These instruments range from temporary primary legislation (Ordinances) to day-to-day administrative guidelines (Office Memorandums).

== Constitutional Basis ==
The authority of executive to issue these instruments of executive control are derived from the constitution of India

Article 73 of the constitution defines the extent of executive power of the Union government. Article 77 of the constitution mandates that every executive action taken by the Union government should be expressed in the name of the President of India. Article 123 grants the president the legislative power to promulgate Ordinances when Parliament is not in session, Ordinances carry same force as the law of parliament. Article 245 & 246 gives the parliament power to delegate subordinate rule-making authority to the executive.

== Ordinances ==
Ordinances are laws that are promulgated by the President of India on the recommendation of the Union Cabinet, which will have the same effect as an Act of Parliament. They can only be issued when Parliament is not in session. They enable the Indian government to take immediate legislative action. Ordinances cease to operate either if Parliament does not approve of them within six weeks of reassembly, or if both Houses pass disapproving resolutions. It is also compulsory for a session of Parliament to be held within six months. Ordinances can only be issued on subjects over which the Indian Parliament has the power to legislate (the Union List and Concurrent List).

== Rules ==
Rules are type of delegated legislation, delegated by the Parliament of India to the Executive branch. They are the detailed, practical directives drafted by the executive branch to operationalize and enforce a law passed by Parliament.

=== Purpose ===
Indian Parliament passes a dozens of law every year, covering a broad range of topics. Parliament has neither the time, the technical expertise, nor the foresight to codify every administrative form, fee structure, or daily operational procedure into the primary Act. Therefore, Parliament includes a specific "delegation clause" (often toward the end of an Act) that empowers the Central or State Government to "make rules to carry out the provisions of this Act."

=== Process ===
1. The Enabling Provision: The process begins with "Parent Act" (the primary law passed by parliament), which must explicitly grant the executive the power to make Rules.
2. Drafting: The relevant executive Ministry or department drafts the Rules based on the technical requirements of the Act.
3. Public Consultation: In many modern legislations, the government publishes "Draft Rules" to solicit feedback, objections, and suggestions from stakeholders, industry experts, and the general public for a specified period.
4. Finalization and Law Ministry Approval: The department incorporates relevant feedback and sends the final draft to the Ministry of Law and Justice for legal vetting to ensure it aligns with the Parent Act and the Constitution.
5. Gazette Notification: For the Rules to acquire the force of law, they must be published in the Official Gazette of India (or the respective State Gazette for state rules). Until they are notified in the Gazette, they are not legally binding on the public.
6. Laying Before Parliament: To maintain democratic oversight, almost all Parent Acts require that the newly notified Rules be placed (or "laid") before both Houses of Parliament. Parliament has the right to debate, modify, or annul the Rules, typically within a window of 30 session days.

=== Legal Status ===
Rules have the full force of statutory law. Breaking a Rule carries the same legal weight and penalties as breaking the Act itself. However, because they are created by the executive and not directly voted on by elected representatives, they are subject to strict limitations under the doctrine of Ultra Vires.

A Rule can be struck down by the High Courts or the Supreme Court of India under three main conditions

- If a Rule violates any Fundamental Right or a provision of Constitution of India
- The Rule goes beyond the scope of power granted by the Parent Act, contradicts the Parent Act, or attempts to introduce a new policy or tax that Parliament did not authorize
- The executive failed to follow the mandatory procedures required to make the rule, such as failing to publish it in the official Gazette or failing to conduct a legally mandated public consultation.

== Regulations ==
Regulations are a specific form of delegated legislation that possess the same binding legal authority as Rules, but differ in their origin and scope. While "Rules" are typically drafted directly by government Ministries or Departments, "Regulations" are drafted and issued by specialized, independent statutory bodies, regulatory agencies, or commissions.

The Indian Parliament creates these regulatory bodies to oversee highly technical, complex, or rapidly evolving sectors of the economy and public life, delegating to them the power to create the granular laws necessary to govern their respective domains.

=== Purpose ===
The traditional government departments lacked the agility and specialized expertise to micromanage highly technical sectors like telecom, aviation, capital markets, and banking which were growing progressively due to the Economic Reforms.

By creating independent regulators and empowering them to issue Regulations, Parliament achieves three goals:

- Regulations are drafted by domain experts (e.g., bankers, economists, telecom engineers) rather than generalist bureaucrats or politicians.
- Regulatory bodies can monitor market dynamics and issue or amend Regulations much faster than Parliament can amend an Act or a Ministry can overhaul a Rule.
- It provides a degree of separation between political government administration and the day-to-day policing of economic sectors.

=== Process ===
The regulatory body must be explicitly granted the power to make regulations by its founding "Parent Act". The regulator drafts the proposed regulations and is usually legally mandated to publish a "Consultation Paper." This paper explains the rationale behind the proposed law and invites public comments, industry feedback, and expert analysis. The finalized draft, incorporating feedback, is voted upon by the governing board or council of the regulatory agency. Just like Rules, Regulations must be published in the Official Gazette of India to attain legal enforceability. The notified Regulations are sent to Parliament and placed before both Houses. Parliament retains the ultimate authority to review, modify, or annul them.

=== Legal Status ===
Regulations are legally binding on all entities operating within the regulator's jurisdiction. Non-compliance can result in severe financial penalties, cancellation of business licenses, or civil action initiated by the regulator.

Like all delegated legislation, Regulations are subject to Judicial Review and can be struck down as Ultra Vires (beyond the powers) by the High Courts or the Supreme Court if they either Violate the Constitution of India, or Exceed the mandate given to the regulator by Parliament, or Are found to be "manifestly arbitrary" or unreasonably restrict the fundamental right to carry on a trade or business (Article 19(1)(g)).

== Bye-laws ==
Bye-laws represent the decentralized and localized form of rule-making. While Rules are made by the government and Regulations are made by statutory bodies, Bye-laws are drafted by local authorities, municipal bodies, statutory corporations, or registered societies to govern their own internal operations or regulate the specific geographical area under their jurisdiction.

=== Purpose ===
Bye-laws exist to handle localized administrative nuances that require intimate knowledge of a specific community, institution, or geography. They serve three primary functions:

- Regulating day-to-day civic life in urban and rural areas
- Dictating the internal administration of statutory bodies, public universities, or government-owned corporations.
- Governing the mutual rights and obligations of members within cooperative societies or trade unions.

=== Process ===
A local body can only make bye-laws if a Parent Act explicitly grants it the power to do so. The elected council of the municipality, or the managing committee of the institution, drafts the proposed bye-laws and passes them via a formal resolution. For civic bye-laws, the local authority is usually required to publish the draft locally (e.g., in local newspapers) and invite objections from the residents. To prevent local bodies from acting as independent republics, most Parent Acts require that passed bye-laws be sent to the State Government (or Central Government, depending on the body) for confirmation and approval. Once confirmed by the higher government, they are published in the Official Gazette and gain the force of law.

=== Legal status ===
Bye-laws are legally binding within the specific geographical or institutional jurisdiction of the authority that made them. Violating a civic bye-law typically results in administrative fines or penalties.

Like all delegated legislation, bye-laws are subject to the doctrine of Ultra Vires. A High Court or the Supreme Court can strike down a bye-law.

== Gazette Notifications ==
Gazette Notification is the mandatory legal mechanism through which laws, rules, and major executive actions are brought into public force. The Gazette of India (or the respective State Gazette) is the official public journal and authorized legal document of the Government of India. It is published by the Department of Publication under the Ministry of Housing and Urban Affairs and printed by the Government of India Press.

=== Purpose ===
The necessity of the Gazette is rooted in a fundamental principle of natural justice and jurisprudence: Ignorantia juris non excusat (ignorance of the law is no excuse).

For the state to hold a citizen accountable to a law, the state must officially inform the public that the law exists. A law passed by Parliament, a Rule drafted by a Ministry, or a Regulation framed by a statutory body cannot legally bind the public until it is published in the Official Gazette. An internal government memo or a press release holds no legal weight in court; only a Gazette Notification represents the finalized, actionable will of the State. Under Section 81 of the Indian Evidence Act, 1872, Indian courts are bound to presume that any document published in the Official Gazette is genuine, meaning it serves as absolute proof of an executive action.

=== Category ===
Gazette is divided into two categories

- Gazette Ordinary: are published periodically and contain routine government business.
- Gazette Extraordinary: published every day (and sometimes multiple times a day) to notify urgent matters, such as the immediate enforcement of a new law or an Ordinance.

=== Process ===
1. Drafting and Vetting: The sponsoring Ministry drafts the Rule or Order. It is then vetted by the Ministry of Law and Justice to ensure constitutional and legal validity.
2. Authentication: An authorized officer of the Ministry formally signs the document "By order and in the name of the President of India." as mandated under Authentication (Order and other Instrument) Rules, 2002.
3. Submission to Press: The finalized, signed document is sent to the Government of India Press with a specific request to publish it in the appropriate Part and Section of the Gazette.

=== Uses ===
Gazette notifications are used for a wide spectrum of executive actions, ranging from massive structural changes to routine administrative technicalities

Gazette is used to bring acts into force. Parliament often passes an Act but leaves the start date up to the executive. Altering the boundaries of a state, creating a new district, or officially declaring a specific forest area as a "National Park" or "Wildlife Sanctuary" requires a Gazette notification. The official appointment of Constitutional functionaries, such as the Chief Justice of India, Judges of the High Courts, the Chief Election Commissioner, or the Comptroller and Auditor General (CAG) must be published in the Gazette. Under the Land Acquisition laws, the government must issue a Gazette notification declaring its intention to acquire a specific parcel of private land for a public project before it can legally take possession.

=== Digitization ===
Historically, these were massive physical volumes. However, in 2015, the Government of India ceased the physical printing of the Gazette. Today, all notifications are uploaded to the digital e-Gazette portal. Under the Information Technology Act, 2000, the digitally signed e-Gazette holds the exact same legal validity as the traditional printed version.

== Government Orders (GOs) ==
Government Orders (commonly referred to as GOs) are the most frequently used instruments for day-to-day executive governance, policy implementation, and administrative management. While Ordinances, Rules, and Regulations represent the law-making power of the executive, a Government Order represents the pure executive and administrative action of the state.

GOs are extensively used at both the Union (Central) level and the State level, though they are particularly central to the functioning of State Secretariats, where almost every significant bureaucratic action is executed via a GO.

=== Constitutional Basis ===
Article 73 states that the executive power of the Union extends to all matters on which Parliament can make laws. Article 77 mandates that all executive actions of the Government of India must be expressed to be taken in the name of the President.

Similarly, Article 162 links state executive power to state legislative power, and Article 166 mandates that all executive actions of a State Government must be taken in the name of the Governor.

Therefore, when a Secretary to the Government signs a GO, they are legally acting "By order and in the name of the President" (or Governor), exercising the state's executive power as mandated under Authentication (Order and other Instrument) Rules, 2002.

=== Purpose ===
GOs are used for policy implementation like launching a new welfare scheme, defining its eligibility criteria, and outlining how it will be administered. They can also be used for financial sanctions such as approving the release of funds from the treasury for a specific public project. They are also used for the purpose of personnel management issuing orders for the transfer, promotion, or suspension of government employees and civil servants. They are also used to carry out administrative directives such as declaring public holidays, creating new administrative departments, or setting up ad-hoc investigative committees.

=== Categorization of GOs (State Level) ===
In many Indian states (particularly in Southern states like Andhra Pradesh, Telangana, Tamil Nadu, and Kerala), Government Orders are highly classified based on their permanence, financial impact, and routing. The most common classifications are:

- G.O. Ms. (Manuscript Series): These are major, permanent orders that involve significant policy decisions, rule changes, or financial sanctions. They are carefully preserved in the state archives and are usually uploaded to public domains.
- G.O. Rt. (Routine Series): These are temporary, day-to-day administrative orders. They cover routine matters like an officer's transfer, granting leave, or minor financial approvals. They are generally not preserved permanently.
- G.O. (D) / (Draft): Used for disciplinary proceedings against government staff or specific departmental matters.

=== Process ===
1. Proposal: A government department identifies a need.
2. File Circulation: A physical or e-office file is created. If it involves money, it must be sent to the Finance Department for "financial concurrence" (approval). If it involves legal ambiguities, it is sent to the Law Department.
3. Ministerial/Cabinet Approval: Depending on the financial limit or policy impact, the file is approved by the Department Minister, the Chief Minister, or the entire Cabinet.
4. Drafting and Issuance: The Secretariat drafts the official Government Order. It is signed by the Principal Secretary or Secretary of that department.
5. Publication: Significant policy GOs (like G.O. Ms.) are published on the government's official GO web portal and, if required by law, printed in the Official Gazette. Routine GOs are simply dispatched to the relevant departments.

=== Legal Status ===
While Government Orders are legally binding on government departments and officials, their legal standing is subordinate to actual laws. A Government Order cannot override, contradict, or amend an Act of Parliament/State Legislature, nor can it override a Statutory Rule. If a GO conflicts with a Rule, the Rule prevails. Most GOs are purely executive instructions. They cannot be used to levy a new tax or impose a criminal penalty on the public, as those actions require statutory backing (an Act).

GOs are highly susceptible to legal challenge via Writ Petitions (under Article 226 in High Courts or Article 32 in the Supreme Court). Courts routinely strike down or "stay" GOs if they are found to be arbitrary, politically vindictive, or violative of Fundamental Rights (such as a GO that discriminates in government hiring).

== Office Memorandums (OMs) ==
Office Memorandum (commonly abbreviated as OM) is the primary instrument for internal administrative communication, policy clarification, and the management of government employees.

Unlike Statutory Rules or Regulations—which are outward-facing and legally bind the general public—an Office Memorandum is an inward-facing executive instruction. It is the tool the government uses to manage itself, communicate decisions between ministries, and lay down the day-to-day operational guidelines for millions of civil servants and public sector workers.

=== Purpose ===
Because the Indian government is a massive employer and administrative entity, it requires a standardized method to communicate internal rules uniformly across hundreds of departments. OMs are primarily utilized for:

- Service Matters: This is the most common use of OMs. They dictate rules regarding employee promotions, seniority lists, leave entitlements, pension calculations, disciplinary procedures, and transfers.
- Policy Clarifications: When a new statutory Rule is passed, government departments often need guidance on how to interpret and implement it. An OM is issued to provide these step-by-step administrative instructions.
- Financial Guidelines: Issuing internal directives on government spending, such as austerity measures, limits on official travel expenses, or the disbursement of the Dearness Allowance (DA).
- Inter-Departmental Communication: Seeking the opinion, financial concurrence, or legal advice of another ministry (e.g., a Ministry sending an OM to the Ministry of Law and Justice for legal vetting).

=== Legal Status ===
While OMs are not "laws" affecting the general public, they hold immense legal weight within the government apparatus. They are strictly binding on all government officials, departments, and subordinate offices to which they are addressed. Failure to follow an OM can result in departmental disciplinary action against an employee.

OMs are frequently challenged in the Central Administrative Tribunal (CAT) or the High Courts. The judiciary can strike down an OM if it violates fundamental rights (particularly Article 14 on equality and Article 16 on equal opportunity in public employment), if it is arbitrary, or if it illegally attempts to bypass a statutory Rule.

It is a fundamental principle of Indian administrative law that an Office Memorandum is an administrative instruction, not a statutory law. The Supreme Court of India has repeatedly clarified the legal hierarchy between the two. An OM cannot override, amend, or modify a statutory Rule framed under Article 309 of the Constitution (which governs the recruitment and conditions of service for government employees) or an Act of Parliament. An OM can only be used to "fill up the gaps" or supplement statutory rules where the rules are silent. If there is a direct conflict between an OM and a Rule, the Rule strictly prevails.

=== Format ===
To maintain order in the archives, OMs follow a highly standardized, formal format prescribed by the Manual of Office Procedure (MOP). Unlike a formal letter, an OM does not use salutations like "Dear Sir" or complimentary closes like "Yours faithfully." It is written in the third person. Every OM carries a unique alphanumeric file number (e.g., No. 36012/1/2020-Estt.(Res.)) which tracks the department, the specific desk, and the year of issuance. OMs are typically signed by an officer of the rank of Under Secretary, Deputy Secretary, or Joint Secretary to the Government of India.

== Circulars ==
Circular is a broad, informational executive instrument used to disseminate instructions, clarifications, or procedural guidelines to a large number of government departments, subordinate offices, or public sector employees simultaneously.

As the name implies, it is a document meant for wide circulation. While an Office Memorandum (OM) might be issued to decide a specific policy file or address a specific service matter for an individual employee, a Circular is used when the government needs to broadcast a uniform message across the bureaucratic apparatus.

=== Purpose ===
They are generally issued for three primary reasons:

1. Clarifying Ambiguities: When a new statutory Rule or Act is passed, subordinate officers often face confusion on how to interpret technical clauses on the ground. Ministries issue Circulars to clarify the official departmental interpretation of the law, ensuring uniform application across the country.
2. Procedural Reminders: Issuing reminders regarding mandatory bureaucratic compliance, such as deadlines for filing Annual Performance Appraisal Reports (APARs), guidelines for office punctuality, or protocols for the disposal of physical files.
3. General Announcements: Broadcasting routine administrative information, such as the list of gazetted public holidays for the upcoming year, changes in office working hours, or the announcement of a government-sponsored health camp.

=== Legal Status ===
The legal standing of Circulars is one of the most frequently litigated areas of Indian administrative law, particularly in matters of taxation. The courts have established clear boundaries regarding their enforceability. Circulars are strictly binding on the officers and staff of the department that issues them. A junior officer cannot refuse to follow a departmental Circular. A Circular is merely an administrative instruction or an executive interpretation of the law. It is not a law itself. It cannot impose a new financial burden, restrict a fundamental right, or alter a statutory Rule.

The Supreme Court of India has famously ruled on the legal weight of Circulars issued by bodies like the Central Board of Direct Taxes (CBDT) and the Central Board of Indirect Taxes and Customs (CBIC). The court established that while these tax Circulars are binding on the tax assessment officers, they are not binding on the taxpayer or the courts. Furthermore, if a departmental Circular provides a benefit or a relaxed interpretation of the law in favor of the taxpayer, the taxpayer has the legal right to claim that benefit.

Circulars are different from OMs. OMs are often used for taking specific policy decisions or handling service matters. Circulars are generally used to inform or remind a wide audience about decisions that have already been taken or rules that already exist. OMs are highly formal and decision-oriented. Circulars are often instructional and explanatory.

== Guidelines ==
Unlike Statutory Rules or Regulations, which are rigid, binding laws, Guidelines function as the framework for government policies, welfare schemes, and administrative procedures.

They provide a roadmap for how a specific objective should be achieved, offering standard operating procedures (SOPs) while often retaining a degree of flexibility. the Central Government frequently uses Guidelines to direct State Governments or local bodies on how to implement national programs.

=== Purpose ===
Guidelines are used when the government wants to establish a standardized approach to a problem but requires administrative agility. Their primary uses include:

1. Welfare Scheme Implementation: When the Central Government launches an initiative, it issues detailed operational guidelines. These dictate who is eligible, how states should apply for funds, and the timeline for completion.
2. Standard Operating Procedures (SOPs): Establishing technical or procedural standards for specific scenarios, such as disaster management protocols, clinical treatments for new diseases, or environmental clearances.
3. Sectoral Best Practices: Advising industries or public institutions on ideal practices, such as guidelines for corporate social responsibility (CSR) or campus safety at universities.

=== Legal Status ===
The Supreme Court of India has consistently ruled that pure administrative guidelines do not confer any legally enforceable right upon a citizen. A citizen generally cannot file a writ petition demanding the enforcement of a non-statutory guideline.

However, the courts also hold that the government cannot arbitrarily ignore its own guidelines. Under Article 14 of the Constitution (Right to Equality), if the government has established a set of guidelines for awarding a contract or distributing a benefit, it must follow them uniformly. Departing from the guidelines without a valid, recorded reason can be struck down as arbitrary and discriminatory.

Administrative guidelines can never override, contradict, or supersede a statutory Act or Rule.

Guidelines are further categorized into two different categories each having distinct legal weight. Statutory Guidelines are Legally Binding If an Act of Parliament explicitly empowers a regulatory body or ministry to issue "guidelines" for a sector, these hold the force of law. Administrative/Executive Guidelines (Advisory or Conditional), Most government guidelines fall here. They are issued under the general executive power of the state. They do not have statutory force and are generally considered advisory. However, they are often conditionally binding—meaning if a State Government or an NGO wants to receive Central Government funding for a scheme, they must strictly adhere to the guidelines.

== Directions ==
Directions are specific, authoritative commands issued by a higher executive or regulatory authority to a subordinate body, an institution, or a State Government. These are mandatory in nature

=== Purpose ===
Directions are utilized when the government or a regulator needs to enforce strict compliance, rectify an urgent issue, or ensure that a lower authority is not deviating from established law. Their primary uses include:

1. Regulatory Enforcement: Forcing a bank, a factory, or a telecom operator to immediately comply with safety, financial, or environmental standards.
2. Constitutional Federalism: Ensuring that State Governments comply with the laws passed by the Union Parliament and do not act in a way that undermines national policy.
3. Emergency Interventions: Ordering the immediate closure of a polluting industry or freezing the assets of a defaulting financial institution.

=== Categories ===
In India, the power to issue directions is generally split into two distinct categories:

Statutory Directions These are issued by government ministries or independent regulatory bodies under the explicit authority granted to them by a specific Act of Parliament. The "Parent Act" will contain a specific clause granting the regulator this authority. They have the absolute force of law. Failing to comply with a statutory direction is typically an offense punishable by heavy financial penalties, cancellation of licenses, or imprisonment.

Constitutional Directions (Centre-State Relations), Because India is a quasi-federal state, the Constitution empowers the Union (Central) Government to issue direct executive commands to State Governments to ensure national unity and legal compliance. Article 256 & 257, These articles state that the executive power of every State must be exercised in a way that ensures compliance with the laws made by Parliament. Furthermore, the Union executive can give "such directions to a State as may appear to the Government of India to be necessary for that purpose." If a State Government refuses to comply with a lawful direction given by the Union, the President can hold that a situation has arisen where the State cannot be carried on in accordance with the Constitution, paving the way for the imposition of President's Rule (Article 356).

=== Legal Status ===
Directions are strictly binding on the entity they are issued to, because statutory directions often have severe consequences (like shutting down a business), the issuing authority is generally required by administrative law to issue a "Show Cause Notice" first. This gives the receiving party a chance to explain themselves before the final direction is enforced. Directions are frequently challenged in High Courts. A court will strike down a direction if it is Ultra Vires (beyond the regulator's statutory power), if it violates the principles of natural justice, or if it is deemed a "colorable exercise of power" (using a legal power for an ulterior motive).

== Resolutions ==
Resolution (often specifically a Cabinet Resolution or Government Resolution) is a formal, authoritative expression of the government's opinion, major policy stance, or strategic intent.

While instruments like Rules, Regulations, and Directions are used to enforce laws and dictate compliance, a Resolution is typically used to establish a new national policy, or create significant non-statutory institutions. It represents the collective will and decision of the executive branch (usually the Union Cabinet) recorded in a highly formalized manner.

=== Purpose ===
The government utilizes Resolutions when it needs to make a monumental administrative move that does not require the coercive power of a penal law. Their primary functions include:

1. Creating Non-Statutory Bodies: The executive can establish highly influential advisory or planning bodies without needing to pass an Act through Parliament, provided these bodies do not need statutory powers (like the power to arrest, tax, or issue legally binding regulations).
2. Declaring National Policies: When the government finalizes a comprehensive framework that will guide the nation for decades—such as an education policy or an industrial policy—it is often formally adopted and published as a Government Resolution.
3. Appointing Commissions of Inquiry: While some commissions are backed by the Commissions of Inquiry Act, the government frequently uses standard executive resolutions to set up high-level committees, task forces, or expert panels to study a specific issue and submit a report.

=== Process ===
For major national resolutions, a detailed cabinet note is prepared by the sponsoring Ministry. It is debated and passed by the Union Cabinet, chaired by the Prime Minister. The formal text is drafted, outlining the background, the objectives, and the specific decisions taken by the government. To make the Resolution an official public document and a matter of historical record, it is published in Part I, Section 1 of the Gazette of India (which is specifically reserved for non-statutory resolutions and major policy announcements).

=== Legal Status ===
Because a Resolution is fundamentally a declaration of policy rather than a legislative act, its legal standing is very distinct. A Resolution does not have the force of statutory law. It cannot be used to levy a tax, create a criminal offense, deprive a citizen of their property, or infringe upon fundamental rights. A Resolution sits below Acts, Rules, and Regulations in the legal hierarchy. If a government policy declared via a Resolution contradicts a law passed by Parliament, the law strictly prevails. While courts generally do not interfere with pure policy decisions, a Resolution can be struck down if it is unconstitutional, arbitrary, or attempts to execute actions that strictly require statutory backing. However, citizens cannot easily sue the government for merely failing to achieve the goals outlined in a policy resolution.
