= Hugh William Blackadar =

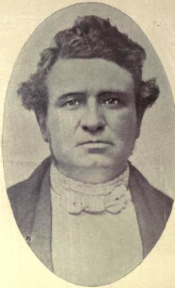
Hugh William Blackadar

Hugh William Blackadar (13 January 1808 – 13 June 1863) was a newspaper printer and publisher from Halifax, Nova Scotia.

Blackadar is best known as the publisher of the Acadian Recorder, a newspaper founded in 1813 by Anthony Henry Holland. Hugh, and partner John English, became joint proprietors in 1837 and sole ownership occurred in 1857 when English died.

The paper embodied his liberal tone and impartial slant on the news of the time. His son, Henry Dugwell Blackadar, continued to foster these qualities after Hugh's death.
