= King's Printer =

Office in the Kingdom of England and its successors

The King's Printer (known as the Queen's Printer during the reign of a female monarch) is typically a bureau of the national, state, or provincial government responsible for producing official documents issued by the King-in-Council, Ministers of the Crown, or other departments. The position is defined by letters patent under the royal prerogative in Canada and the United Kingdom.

== Canada ==
=== Federal ===
The King's Printer for Canada (French: Imprimeur du Roi), so titled as to distinguish it from the equivalent position in each of the Canadian provinces, is the individual in Ottawa responsible for the publishing and printing requirements of the King-in-federal-Council. The minister of public works and government services is empowered by the Department of Public Works and Government Services Act to appoint the King's Printer for Canada on behalf of the sovereign.

=== Provincial and territorial ===
==== Alberta ====
The Alberta King's Printer is the position, created in 1906, that oversees the administration of Crown copyright in the province, as well as publishing and distributing copies of legislation, regulations, and related material, including the Alberta Gazette, in both hard copy and electronic forms. Such print and digital media is also distributed by the King's Printer to libraries around Alberta, as well as being sold at a dedicated bookstore in Edmonton and via the Internet. The King's Printer themself is appointed by the Lieutenant Governor of Alberta-in-Council.

==== British Columbia ====
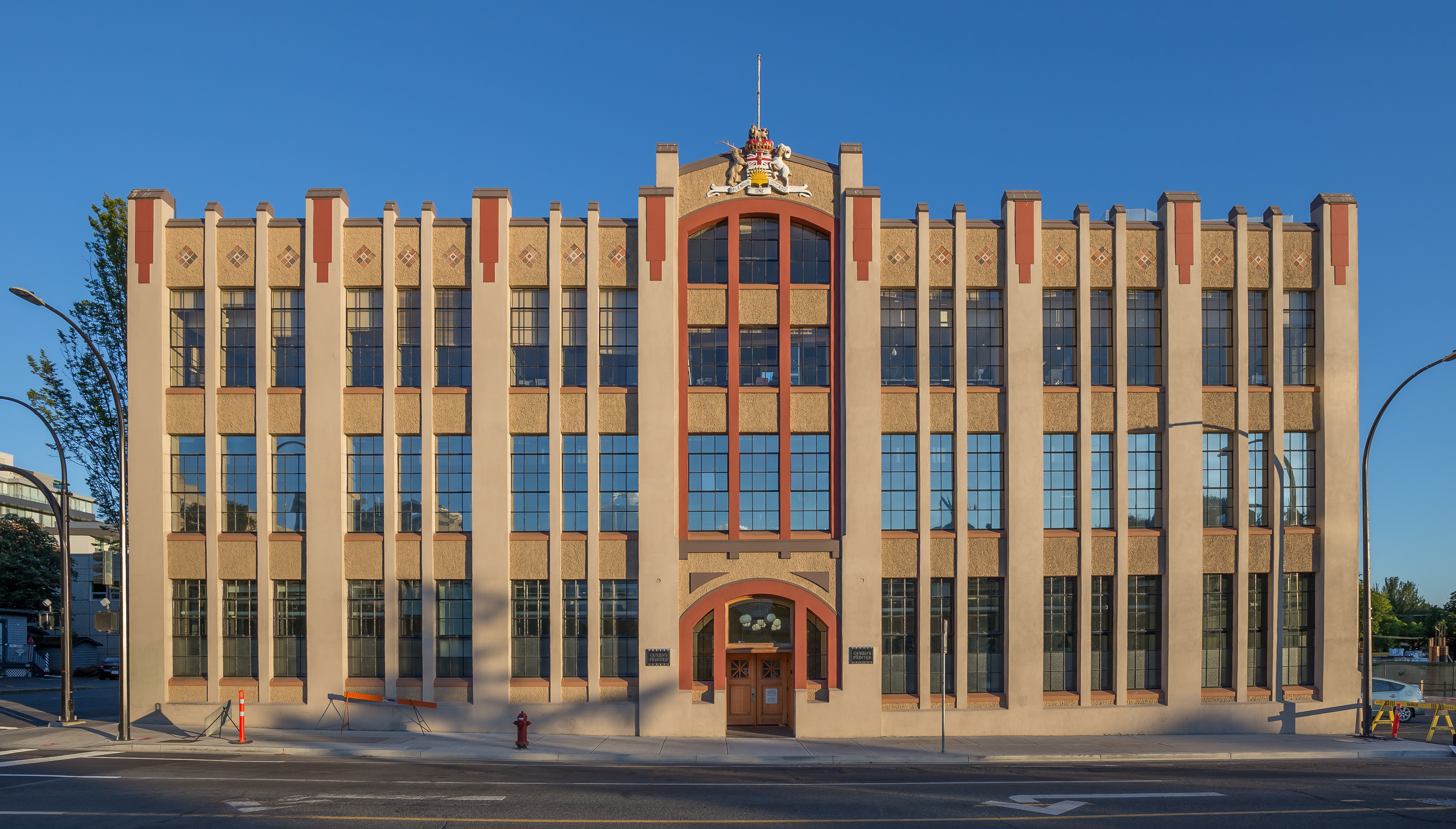
King's Printer building in Victoria, British Columbia, houses the offices for the King's Printer for British Columbia.

In British Columbia, the office of the King's Printer and Comptroller of Stationery for British Columbia is a branch of the province's Procurement and Supply Services department. It not only supplies paper and electronic copies of all legislation, regulations, and related materials, including the British Columbia Gazette, but also operates a book and gift store called Crown Publications, and provides to the public printing, copying, and binding services. Once legislation has been granted Royal Assent, the Clerk of the Legislative Assembly must provide to the King's Printer a certified copy of the new law, as well as the journals of all sessions of the legislature.

==== Manitoba ====
King's Printer for Manitoba was established in 1870 at the founding of Manitoba. The current King's Printer is the Deputy Minister of Finance, however the function is delegated to the Communications and Engagement Division of Manitoba Finance. Under the Queen's Printer Act of Manitoba, the King's Printer has three roles:

- it is the official source of Government of Manitoba statutory publications including acts and regulations, the Manitoba Gazette, and the CCSM (Continuing Consolidation of the Statutes of Manitoba);
- it is responsible for arranging or entering into contracts on behalf of the government with respect to publishing, advertising and communication services; and
- it holds all Crown copyright in the province, including provincial logos and marks, with most material available for use under open use license

In these roles, the King's Printer of Manitoba, represented by the Communications and Engagement Division, continues a 150-year tradition of communicating the work of the Manitoba government to the public.

==== New Brunswick ====
A King's Printer for New Brunswick is appointed by the Lieutenant Governor of New Brunswick on the advice of their Executive Council, and thereafter publishes the regulations, acts of the provincial parliament, and The Royal Gazette, and supplies them to libraries across the province and for sale to the public.

==== Newfoundland and Labrador ====
A King's Printer for Newfoundland and Labrador is appointed by the Minister of Digital Government and Service.

==== Nova Scotia ====
The King's Printer for Nova Scotia publishes the Royal Gazette.

==== Ontario ====
The King's Printer for Ontario holds Crown copyright in that province, and all material hence bears the mark © King's Printer for Ontario. The department must, by law, print the Ontario Gazette.

==== Prince Edward Island ====
The Lieutenant Governor of Prince Edward Island appoints a King's Printer for the province, who is an officer of the Department of the Provincial Treasury and is overseen by the minister of the Crown for that department. The King's Printer is required by law to publish the Royal Gazette, as well as copies of all legislation, journals of the legislature, and other material printed as the cost of the King in Right of Prince Edward Island.

==== Quebec ====
The equivalent agency for Quebec is the Québec Official Publisher (French: L'Éditeur officiel du Québec).

==== Saskatchewan ====
The Office of the King's Printer in Saskatchewan is based in Regina and has the duty of publishing and distributing official copies of all legislation, regulations, and related material, including the Saskatchewan Gazette, and any other publications ordered by the Lieutenant Governor of Saskatchewan-in-Council. The King's Printer also holds Crown copyright on behalf of the King in Right of Saskatchewan, and has the ability to release, in exceptional circumstances, such copyright on a one-time basis. The Queen's Printer themself is appointed by the Lieutenant Governor of Saskatchewan-in-Council. Once legislation in has been granted Royal Assent, the Clerk of the Legislative Assembly must provide to the King's Printer a certified copy of the new law, as well as the journals of all sessions of the legislature.

==== Northwest Territories ====
The official printer of the Northwest Territories is known as the Territorial Printer.

==== Nunavut ====
The official printer is known as the Nunavut Official Editor/Territorial Printer.

==== Yukon ====
In Yukon, the King's Printer has been in existence since 1976. It performs its basic function as a legislative printer, comptroller of stationery, printer for the departments, publisher of The Yukon Gazette, and printer of the proceedings of the Legislative Assembly.

== United Kingdom ==
The holder of the letters patent has the nearly exclusive right of printing, publishing and importing the Authorised Version of the Bible and Book of Common Prayer within the United Kingdom's jurisdiction. There are three exceptions which apply to this right. One is that the office of King's Printer only extends to England, Wales and Northern Ireland. Within Scotland the rights to the King James Bible are administered for the Crown by the Bible Board, which holds the office of His Majesty's sole and only Master Printers and which licenses the printing of the Bible, New Testament and Book of Psalms. The other two exceptions are that separate sets of letters patent grant the Oxford University Press and Cambridge University Press the right to print and distribute the Authorised Version of the Bible and the Book of Common Prayer regardless of who holds the office of King's Printer.

In 1767 Charles Eyre received a patent as the King's Printer and a few years later Andrew Strahan operated with Eyre in the same role. Following Strahan's retirement in 1819 his nephews Andrew and Robert Spottiswoode continued to work as the King's Printer and were later to run the firms Spottiswoode and Co. and Eyre & Spottiswoode. From 1875 George Edward Eyre and William Spottiswoode were "printers to the Queen's most excellent majesty for Her Majesty's Stationery Office". In 1901 after the accession of King Edward VII the firm of Eyre & Spottiswoode was "re-appointed King's Printer".

The Controller of HMSO is appointed by Letters Patent to the office of King's Printer of Acts of Parliament. As of 2016, the office of King's Printer of Acts of Parliament is held by the Chief Executive and Keeper of The National Archives, Jeff James.

=== Devolved ===
Section 92 of the Scotland Act 1998 establishes the office of King's Printer for Scotland, and provides for it to be held by the King's Printer of Acts of Parliament. The King's Printer for Scotland is responsible for administering Crown copyright in Acts of the Scottish Parliament, Scottish subordinate legislation and works made by the Scottish Government. As of 2016, the office of the King's Printer for Scotland is Jeff James.

The Legislation (Procedure, Publication and Repeals) (Wales) Act 2025 would formally establish the King's Printer for Wales (Welsh: Argraffydd y Brenin ar gyfer Cymru).

The equivalent office for Northern Ireland is the Government Printer for Northern Ireland.

== See also ==
- Office of Public Sector Information
- United States Government Publishing Office
