= Anthony Henry (printer) =

Soldier and printer

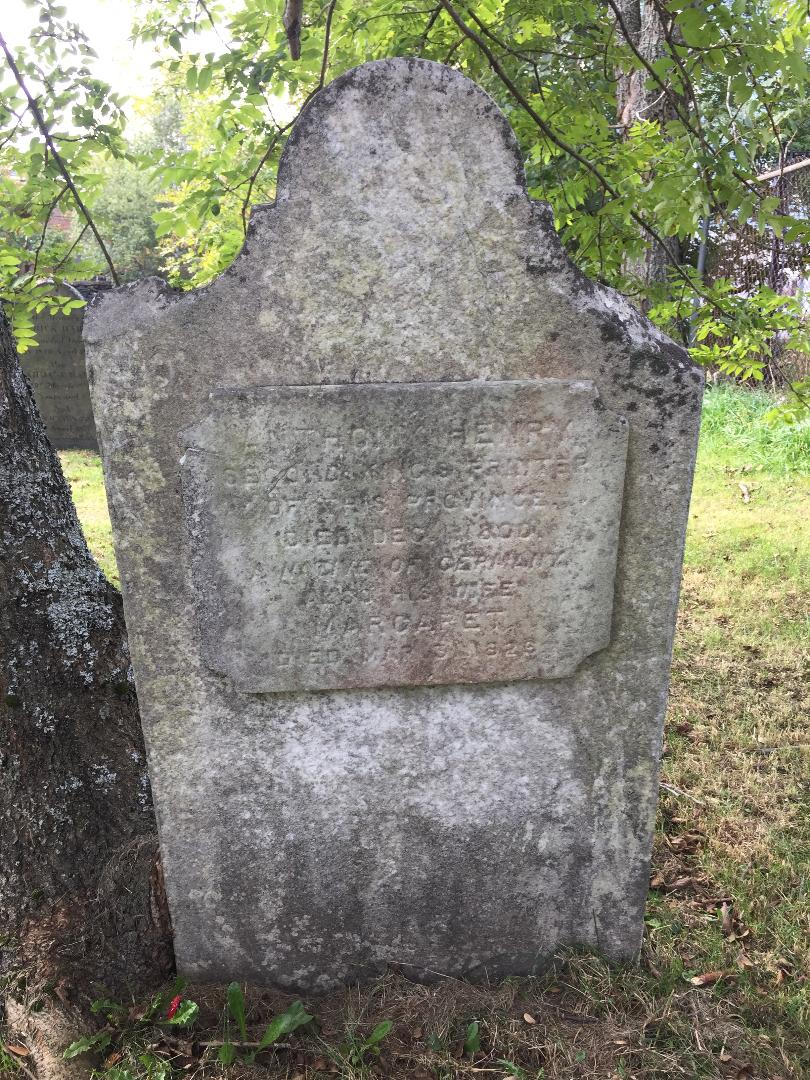
Anthony Henry, Little Dutch (Deutsch) Church, Halifax, Novs Scotia

Anthony Henry (Anton Heinrich) (1734-1800) was a soldier and the King's printer in Halifax, Nova Scotia. He was a fifer for the British in the Siege of Louisbourg (1758). He later became the publisher of the Halifax Gazette after the death of John Bushell. He opposed the Stamp Act 1765 which he openly criticized and faced charges of sedition for. He later founded The Nova Scotia Chronicle and Weekly Advertiser, the first independent newspaper in Canada. He is the namesake and godfather of Anthony Henry Holland. He was warden of the Little Dutch church. After his death, John Howe (loyalist) became the King's printer.

== See also ==
- Early American publishers and printers
- List of early American publishers and printers

== Sources ==
- Thomas, Isaiah (1874). The history of printing in America, with a biography of printers. Vol. I. New York, B. Franklin.
