= John Bushell =

North American printer 1715-1761

John Bushell (March 18, 1715 — c. January 22, 1761) was the first printer in what is now Canada.

== Biography ==
Bushell was born in Boston, Province of Massachusetts, and was apprenticed as a printer there. He subsequently worked for a number of different printers and had his own printing business until 1751, when he left for Halifax, Nova Scotia.

A partner of Bushell's, Bartholomew Green, following a century-long family tradition in the trade, had left Boston for Halifax in October 1751 and brought all the necessary equipment to set up a printing shop. He died shortly after his arrival, and Bushell went to Halifax to continue the business.

Bushell's first publication was issued from his shop on Grafton Street on March 23, 1752. The Halifax Gazette was published as a subscription newspaper and was a single broadside sheet, printed on both sides. This probably was the first work of any kind printed in Canada. He went on to print the Gazette and became the King's printer until his death, when the Gazette and the role of King's printer were taken up by Anthony Henry. The paper's content ranged from elegies, to excerpts from notable publications of the day, notices of upcoming dramatic productions around Halifax, and advertisements from booksellers about newly arrived books.

Bushell's paper also advertised the availability of his press for miscellaneous printing jobs. This was not enough to keep him out of insolvency, however, and he was in debt during most of his life in Halifax.

Bushell died in February, 1761, leaving one son and a daughter. The son was sent to Portsmouth, Province of New Hampshire, in the American colonies, and entered into an apprenticeship with Daniel Fowle, an accomplished printer who owned and published the New Hampshire Gazette.

== See also ==
- Early American publishers and printers

== Sources ==
- McMurtrie, Douglas Crawford (1930). The first printing in Nova Scotia. Chicago: Eyncourt Press.
- Parker, George Lawrence (1985). The beginnings of the book trade in Canada. Toronto; Buffalo: University of Toronto Press. ISBN 978-0-8020-25470.
- Thomas, Isaiah (1874). The history of printing in America, with a biography of printers. Vol. I. New York: B. Franklin.
