= Halifax Gazette =

First newspaper in Canada

- Front page of the Halifax Gazette, March 23, 1752
- Type: Weekly newspaper
- Founded: March 23, 1752
- City: Halifax, Nova Scotia

The Halifax Gazette was Canada's first newspaper, established on March 23, 1752, in Halifax, Nova Scotia. It was published weekly by John Bushell, who had been carrying out a project that had been initiated by his partner Bartholomew Green, Jr. The newspaper had been entirely dependent on the government for funding. Richard Bulkeley became the editor in 1758. After Bushell, Anthony Henry became the publisher, followed by John Howe.

== Founding ==
Halifax was established as a city in 1749, three years before the newspaper was published, with a population of 4,000 residents. Because of the developing city and the low population, there was a shortage of local news or community news, and advertisements occupied a large portion of the newspaper. It contained news excerpts from the newspapers of Britain, Europe, and New England.

The first issue of the Halifax Gazette contained an article about the demise of John Goreham, a military officer and businessman who died in London of smallpox.

== Competition ==
The Halifax Gazette dealt with tough competition from Boston and New York newspapers for breaking news. The publishers plotted and planned in advance to beat each other in printing the headlines first. In the year of 1849, there was a group of six New York publishers who comprised the Associated Press. This agency worked together to accumulate and spread breaking international news. In this process, Halifax played an integral role; however, it was hardly mentioned.

== Nova Scotia Royal Gazette ==
The Gazette published as a newspaper until 1867, three days after Canada was established, when it became the Nova Scotia Royal Gazette, the official publication of laws and legislation for the government of Nova Scotia.

In 1977, Part II of the Royal Gazette was introduced to publish provincial regulations and was reunited with Part I to form the current Gazette.

The Gazette is managed by the Office of the Registrar of Regulations in the Nova Scotia Department of Justice.

== Return of the first issue to Canada ==
The only remaining copy of the first issue of Halifax Gazette was long owned by the Massachusetts Historical Society in Boston. It was acquired in 2002 by the Library and Archives Canada, and briefly placed on display back in Halifax before being permanently placed in the archives at Ottawa.

== See also ==
- Canada Gazette
- Gazette officielle du Québec
- Ontario Gazette
- Literature of Nova Scotia
