= Acadia Paper Mill =

Paper mill in Nova Scotia in the 1800s

Coordinates: 44.7142°N 63.6791°W

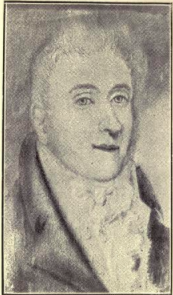
Anthony Henry Holland, Founder

The Acadia Paper Mill was established in Nova Scotia by Anthony Henry Holland sometime between 1817 and 1819. It was the second paper mill in Canada and the first in Atlantic Canada.The mill was built on the Nine Mile River, near Bedford Basin. Early paper makers included two sons-in-law of Holland; John Campbell and Samuel Courtney.

From 1839 to 1841, Charles Fenerty experimented with wood fibers at this mill. The Canadian inventor produced the first sheet of paper made from wood pulp in North America.

Sometime in the 1860s, the mill was relocated further downstream. On August 20, 1875, the mill was destroyed in a fire, and was never rebuilt.
