= Canada Gazette =

Official periodical of the Government of Canada

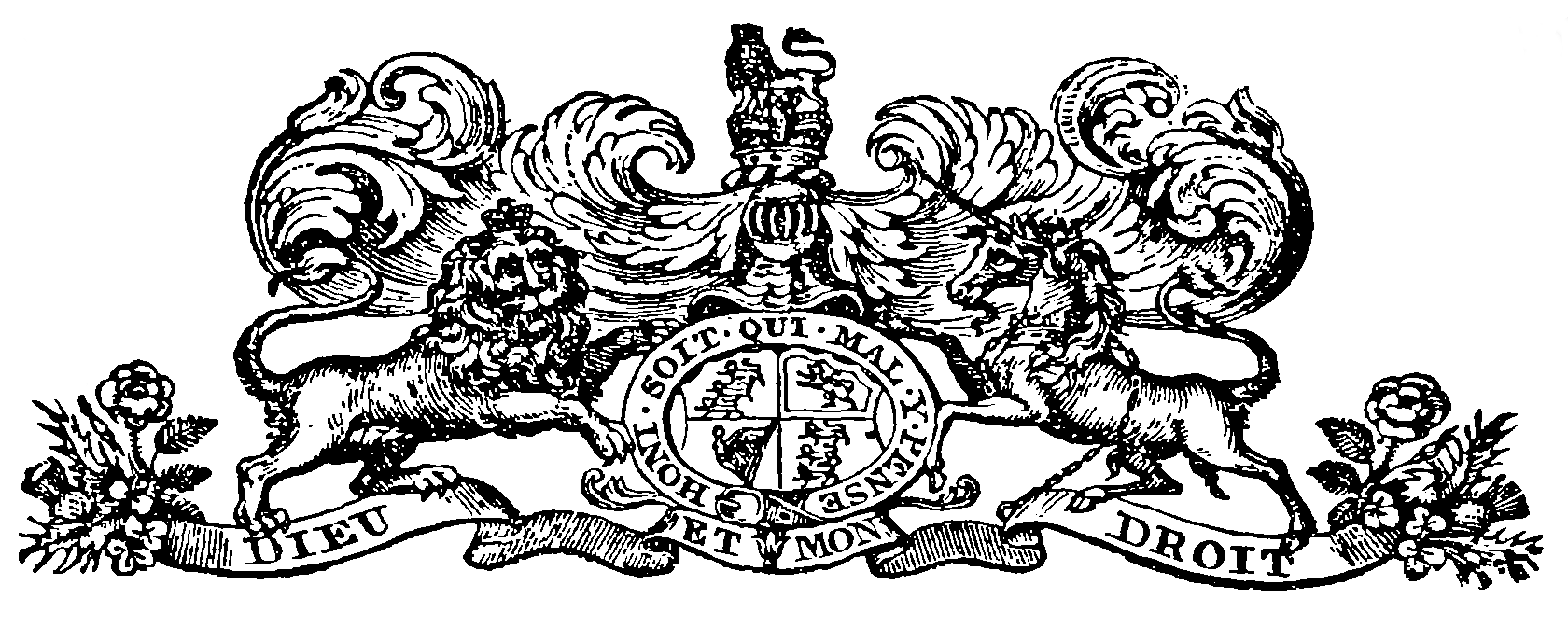

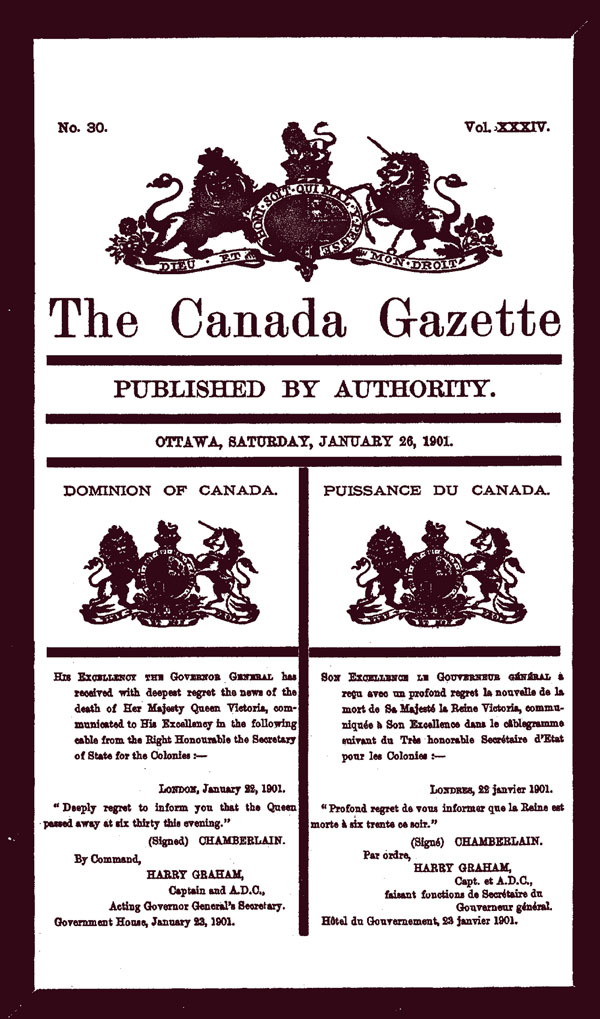
- Canada Gazette (January 26, 1901)
- Founded: 1841; 185 years ago
- Country: Canada
- Website: gazette.gc.ca

The Canada Gazette (French: Gazette du Canada) is the official government gazette of the Government of Canada. It was first published on October 2, 1841. While it originally published all acts of the Parliament of Canada, it later also published treaties, hearing and tribunals, proclamations and regulations, and various other official notices as required. At one time it contained information on bankruptcies. It has been administered by Public Works and Government Services Canada and the King's Printer for Canada since 1841. The Gazette is most often read to find new acts, regulations and proclamations.

== Legal status ==
While not always widely read by the public, publication in the Gazette is considered official notice to all Canadians. After a regulation has been approved by the Privy Council Office and then the Cabinet of Canada, the regulation is published in the Gazette. If a regulation has not been published in the Gazette, a person cannot be convicted of the offence.

Canada's provinces all have their own equivalents of the Gazette.

== Publishing ==
From inception in 1841 until 1998, the Gazette was published in print only. From 1998 until April 1, 2014, it was published in print and online, with the online version having the same official status as the printed version starting in 2003. Since April 1, 2014, it has only been published online to satisfy a Government of Canada requirement to make "electronic publishing its new standard for all documents". Structurally, the Gazette is published in three parts:

=== Part I ===
Part I is published each Saturday. It contains public notices, official appointments and proposed regulations, as well as miscellaneous notices from the private sector that are required to be published by federal statute or by regulations. The proposed regulations are published in Part I as a way for the public to comment on them. Once the regulations are pre-published, the department that sponsored the legislation collects public comments to allow for any changes to be made to the regulation. Recently, Notices of Vacancies for senior positions in the government are published here as well.

=== Part II ===
Part II is published every second Wednesday and it contains all regulations that have been enacted as well as statutory instruments and other documents, such as orders-in-council, orders and proclamations. It has a consolidated index of regulations dating since January 1, 1955.

=== Part III ===
Part III is published with the text of any new laws immediately after they have received Royal Assent and was first published in 1974. Starting from January 1998, all publications other than Part III are available in HTML and are not official. From April 1, 2003, the PDF version is an official version, as it is marked up from the same file as the printed version. It also contains a list of the proclamations of Canada and orders-in-council relating to the coming into force of federal acts.

== Exemptions ==
Certain types of regulations do not need to be published in the Gazette. These include regulations that affect only a limited number of people, those for which their publication would counter national defence or international relations, or if their publication would violate personal privacy, such as notices of paroles and pardons.

== See also ==
- Gazette officielle du Québec
- Halifax Gazette
- Ontario Gazette
- List of government gazettes
