= Gazette officielle du Québec =

Government gazette of Quebec

The Gazette officielle du Québec (French pronunciation: [ɡazɛt ɔfisjɛl dy kebɛk]) is an official publication of the Quebec government. It is used to promulgate new laws and regulations, which thereby become official. It was founded on January 16, 1869.

An earlier Gazette de Québec was an unofficial publication created in 1764, and was replaced by Gazette officielle du Québec in 1823. Archived versions of the Gazette from 1869 to 1995 are available. An annual subscription to the Gazette costs $1185 ($500 and $685, for part 1 and 2, respectively) per year, for both parts. One copy costs $10.71. The printed version ceased on April 1, 2024.

== See also ==
- Canada Gazette
- Halifax Gazette
- Ontario Gazette
- List of government gazettes
