= Acadian Recorder =

Defunct Canadian newspaper in Nova Scotia

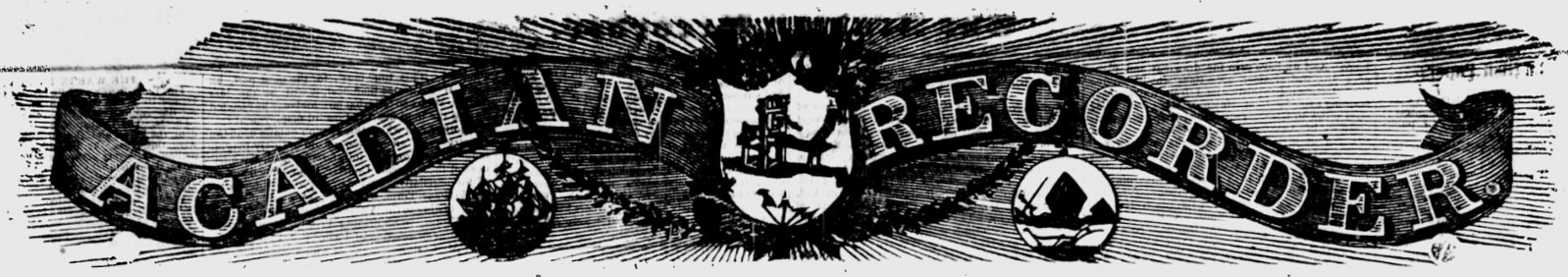

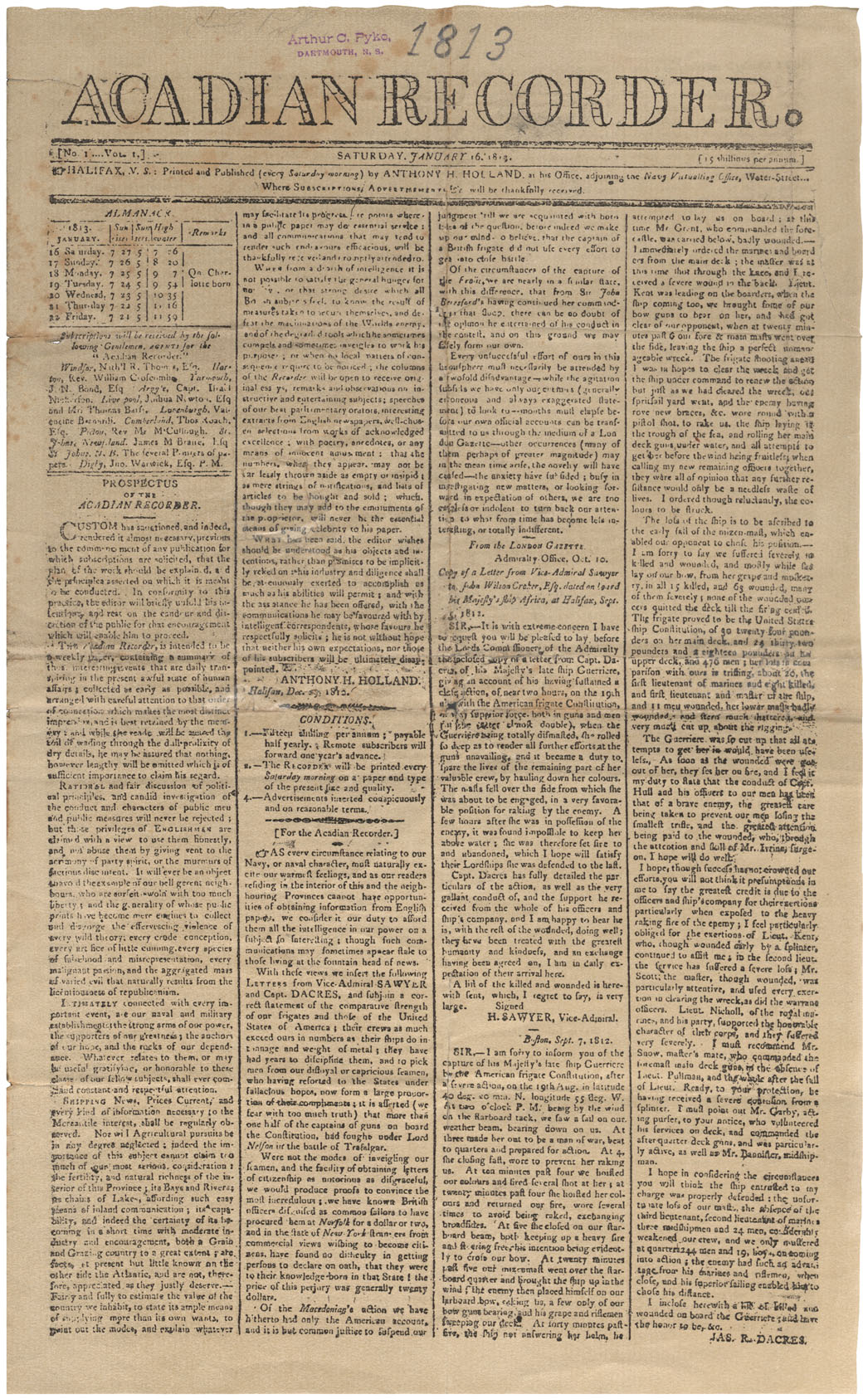
- Frontpage of the first issue (January 16, 1813)
- Type: Weekly newspaper
- Format: Broadsheet
- Founded: January 16, 1813
- Ceased publication: May 10, 1930

The Acadian Recorder was a weekly newspaper published during the 19th century in Halifax, Nova Scotia, Canada. The newspaper was founded on January 16, 1813, by Anthony Henry Holland.

He was joined in 1821 by his brother, Philip. In 1824, Philip assumed full control of the publication. In 1837, the paper came under the ownership of John English and Hugh William Blackadar. The family retained control of the newspaper until it ceased publication on May 10, 1930, shortly after the death of C.C. Blackadar.

The newspaper was published for over a century printing local, national and international stories. Other features of the paper included shipping news, marriage announcements and obituaries, a poetry and story section, a weekly almanac, and advertisements.
