= Anthony Henry Holland =

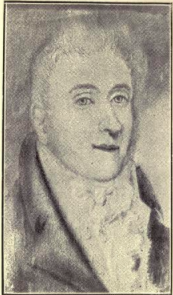
Anthony Henry Holland

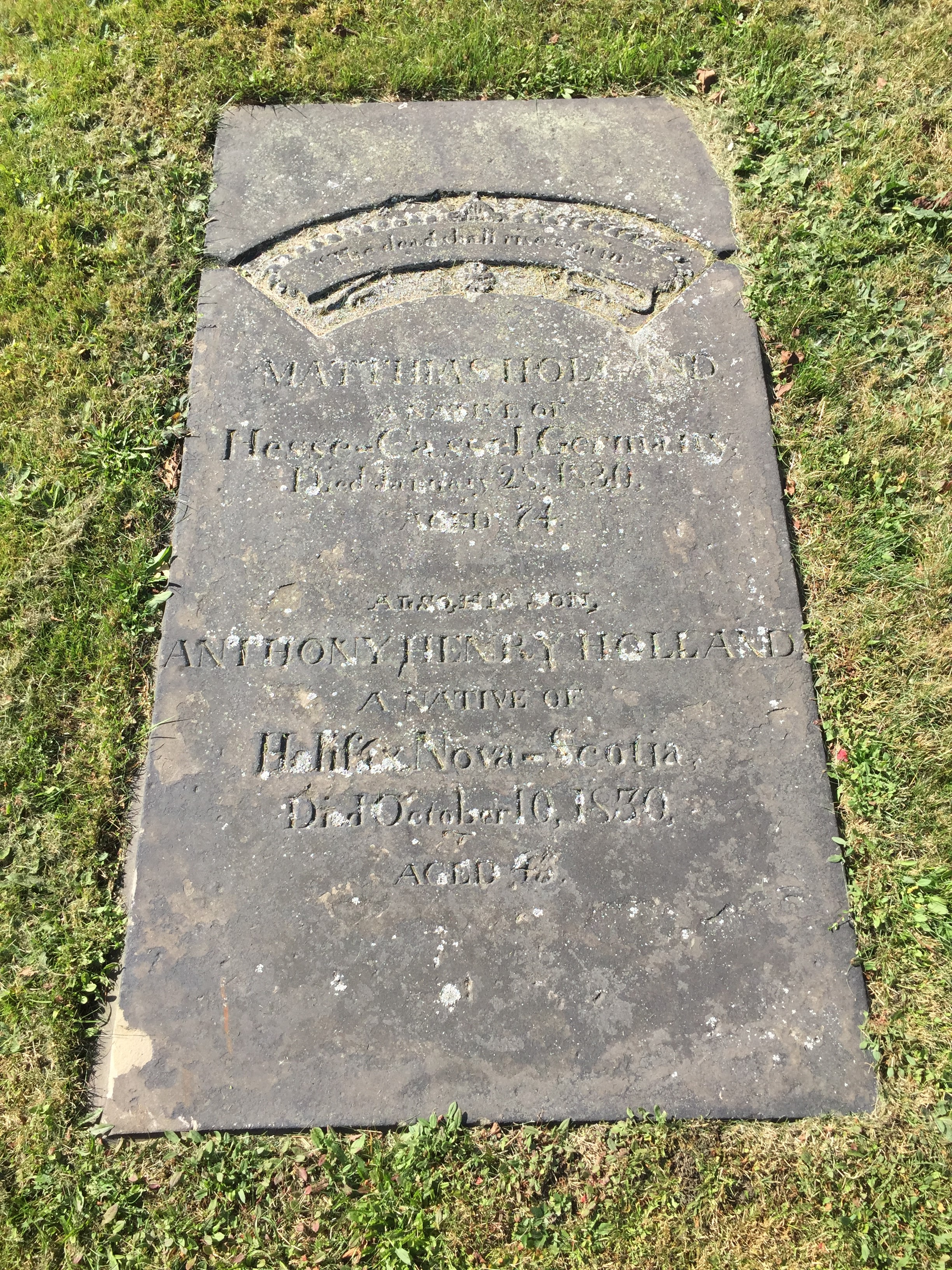
Anthony and his father Johann Holland, Little Dutch (Deutsch) Church, Halifax, Nova Scotia

Anthony Henry Holland (25 November 1785 – 10 October 1830) was a Halifax businessman and printer. He was named after and the godson of Anthony Henry.

Holland is best known for founding the Acadian Recorder in 1813. In 1819, he founded and successfully ran the first paper mill in Atlantic Canada. It was known as the Acadia Paper Mill and was located on the Nine Mile River, near Bedford Basin.

He is buried in the cemetery of the Little Dutch (Deutsch) Church, Halifax, Nova Scotia.
