= Ontario Gazette =

Government gazette of Ontario, Canada

The Ontario Gazette (French: La Gazette de l’Ontario) is the official publication of the Government of Ontario, Canada, first published in 1868. Publications are available online, as far back as January 2000. Prior publications are found at the Archives of Ontario and depository libraries and published every Saturday.

== Predecessors ==
The publication was preceded by pre Confederation versions:

- Quebec Gazette 1764 to 1823 for the province of Lower Canada and British province of Quebec
- Quebec Official Gazette 1823 to 1840; from 1869 it has been published for the province of Quebec
- Upper Canada Gazette 1793 to 1840 for the province of Upper Canada

Following the Union of Lower Canada and Upper Canada, the Canada Gazette became the official publication.

== Ceasing print publications ==
In 2021, Queen's Printer stopped publishing the gazette in print.

== See also ==
- Canada Gazette
- Gazette officielle du Québec
- Halifax Gazette
