= Lunenburg Opera House =

1909 theatre building in Lunenburg, Nova Scotia, Canada

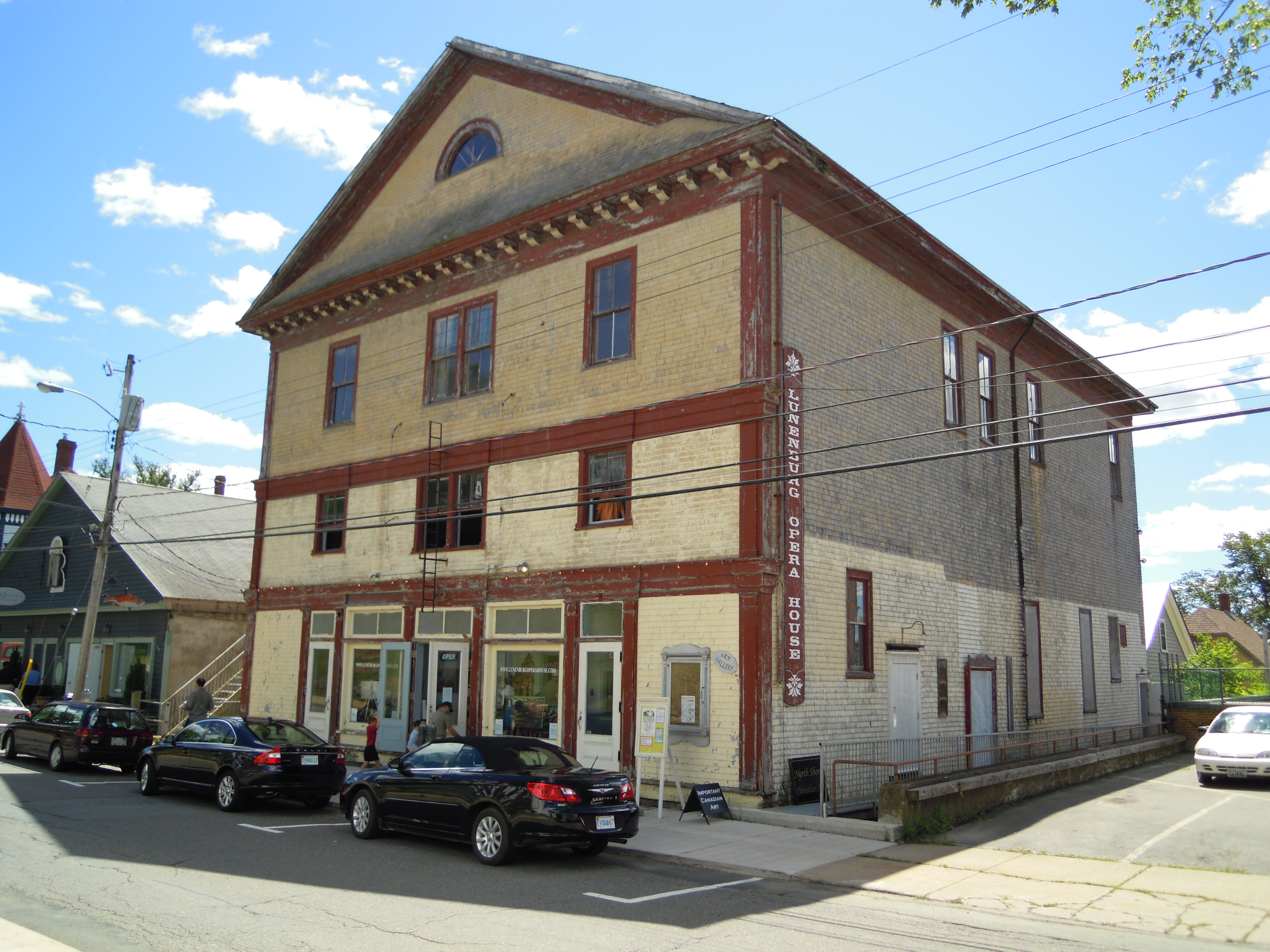
- The Lunenburg Opera House in 2010
- Interactive map of Lunenburg Opera House
- Former names: Capitol Theatre (c. 1940 – c. 1970)
- Address: 290 Lincoln Street; Lunenburg, Nova Scotia; B0J 2C0; Canada
- Coordinates: 44°22′37.4″N 64°18′32.9″W
- Seating type: Standing room

Construction
- Built: 20 November 1907
- Opened: January 1909

The Lunenburg Opera House is a building within the UNESCO World Heritage Site in Lunenburg, Nova Scotia, Canada. In 1907, the land needed to build the Opera House was purchased by the Rising Sun Lodge of the International Order of Odd Fellows from C. E. Kaulbach for $3,560 and construction began on the Opera House in the same year. Construction was completed in 1908, and the building opened for its first concert that year. The Opera House operated as a vaudeville concert hall and live theatre until the 1940s, when it was converted to a cinema, the Capitol Theatre.

The Capitol Theatre operated until the 1970s, and in the mid-1970s, the building was purchased by Jack Sheriff, a former English professor at Acadia University and longtime promoter of the arts in Nova Scotia. After Sheriff's death, the Folk Harbour Society, in collaboration with other Lunenburg organizations, launched a campaign to buy, restore and operate the building.

However, restoration of the Lunenburg Opera House began in 2006 when it was purchased by businessman Farley Blackman. The decade-long renovation that followed saw a new roof, new siding, windows, doors, insulation, seating, and more added to the historic structure. Blackman purchased it following rumors that it could be turned into a condo building, with street-level shops selling t-shirts. In an article in the local newspaper, Lighthouse Now, he said, "I thought this building needed to be used for its original intent. It would be for the arts - the arts for arts' sake. It's an opportunity for people to learn without travelling the world. Let's have the world come to Lunenburg."

In 2019, it was purchased by the Lunenburg Folk Harbour Society with financial help from the Fordi Family Foundation. The Lunenburg Opera House officially reopened on 5 October 2019 and the Lunenburg Folk Harbour Society has plans to use the building as an arts centre, a venue for the Lunenburg Folk Harbour Festival, as well as opening the space to rentals from other groups.
