= St. Paul's Church (Halifax, Nova Scotia) =

St Paul's Church
- St Paul's in the Grand Parade
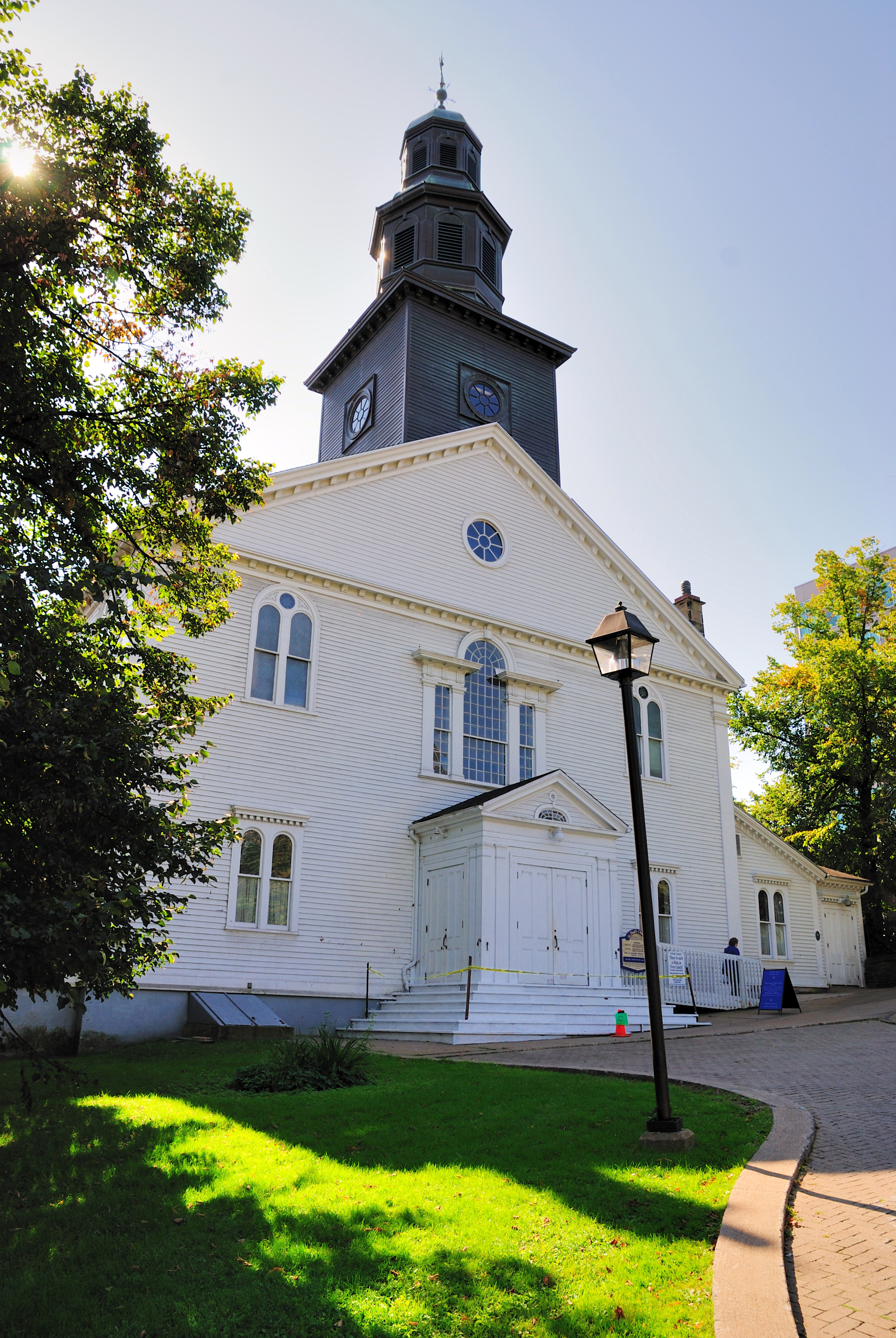
- St Paul's Church
- St Paul's Church
- 44°38′51″N 63°34′29″W
- Location: 1749 Argyle Street; Halifax, Nova Scotia; B3J 3K4
- Country: Canada
- Denomination: Anglican
- Churchmanship: Anglican Church of Canada
- Website: stpaulshalifax.org

History
- Founded: 13 June 1750

Architecture
- Architect: James Gibbs
- Architectural type: Georgian
- Completed: 2 September 1750

National Historic Site of Canada
- Official name: St. Paul's Anglican Church National Historic Site of Canada
- Designated: 1981

Nova Scotia Heritage Property Act
- Type: Provincially Registered Property
- Designated: 7 November 1983
- Reference no.: 00PNS0006

St. Paul's Church is a historically evangelical Anglican church in downtown Halifax, Nova Scotia, within the Diocese of Nova Scotia and Prince Edward Island of the Anglican Church of Canada. It is located at the south end of the Grand Parade, an open square in downtown Halifax with Halifax City Hall at the northern end.

The church is modelled after Marybone Chapel in Westminster, London, which was designed by controversial architect James Gibbs, the architect of St Martin-in-the-Fields at Trafalgar Square.

Built during Father Le Loutre's War, it is the oldest surviving Protestant church in Canada and the oldest building in Halifax. There is also a crypt below the church. Close to the church is the St. Paul's Church Cemetery. The official chapel of the church was the Little Dutch (Deutsch) Church.

Saint Paul's was designated a National Historic Site of Canada in 1981. In 1981, it was designated a Municipal Registered Heritage Property by the former City of Halifax, and in 1983 it was designated a Provincially Registered Heritage Property both under the provincial Heritage Property Act.

== History ==
St. Paul's Church was founded in 1749 (the same year as the Halifax colony). The construction was begun in 1750 and is based on the ground plan of Gibbs' Marybone Chapel (later St. Peter's, Vere Street) in London, with later additions such as a larger tower. The Reverend William Tutty (1715–1754) opened the church on 2 September 1750. Rev. William Tutty was the first minister (1750–54); followed by Rev. John Breynton (1754–91) and Rev. Thomas Wood (1752–64), who served at the same time. The church also served as the site for the initial congregation of St. Matthew's United Church (Halifax) until this church was built.

During the French and Indian War (the North American theatre of the Seven Years' War), the church was the site of the burials of two prominent Nova Scotians: Governor Charles Lawrence (d.1760) and Catholic Priest Pierre Maillard (d.1762), the latter ceremony was attended by a large number of Mi'kmaq people. (Also during the war, the church was where Horatio Gates married Elizabeth Phillips in 1754.) Soon after the war, Vice-Admiral Philip Durell (d. 1766) was buried after having participated in the Siege of Louisbourg (1758) and the Siege of Quebec (1759).

During the American Revolution the church held funerals for Francis McLean (d. 1781) who defended New Ireland (Maine) during the war; Capt Henry Francis Evans (d.1781) who died in the Naval Battle off Cape Breton (1781); Baron Oberst Franz Carl Erdmann von Seitz Hatchment (d.1782) who was the commander of the Hessian soldiers that defended Lunenburg in the Raid on Lunenburg (1782); and Governor Michael Francklin (d. 1782), whose funeral was also attended by a large number of Mi'kmaq people.

After the American Revolution, with the creation of the Diocese of Nova Scotia in 1787, St. Paul's was given the Bishop's seat, making it the first Anglican cathedral outside of Great Britain. It served as the cathedral from 1787 to 1864. The diocese included Nova Scotia, New Brunswick, Newfoundland, St. Johns (now Prince Edward Island), and across Quebec and Ontario to Windsor, and Bermuda. For many decades it was one of the few places of worship in Halifax, and other denominations would thus hold services in the building.

During the Halifax Explosion of 1917, a piece of wooden window frame from another building was lodged into the wall of St. Paul's Church, where it remains today.

== Prominent monuments ==
=== Men ===
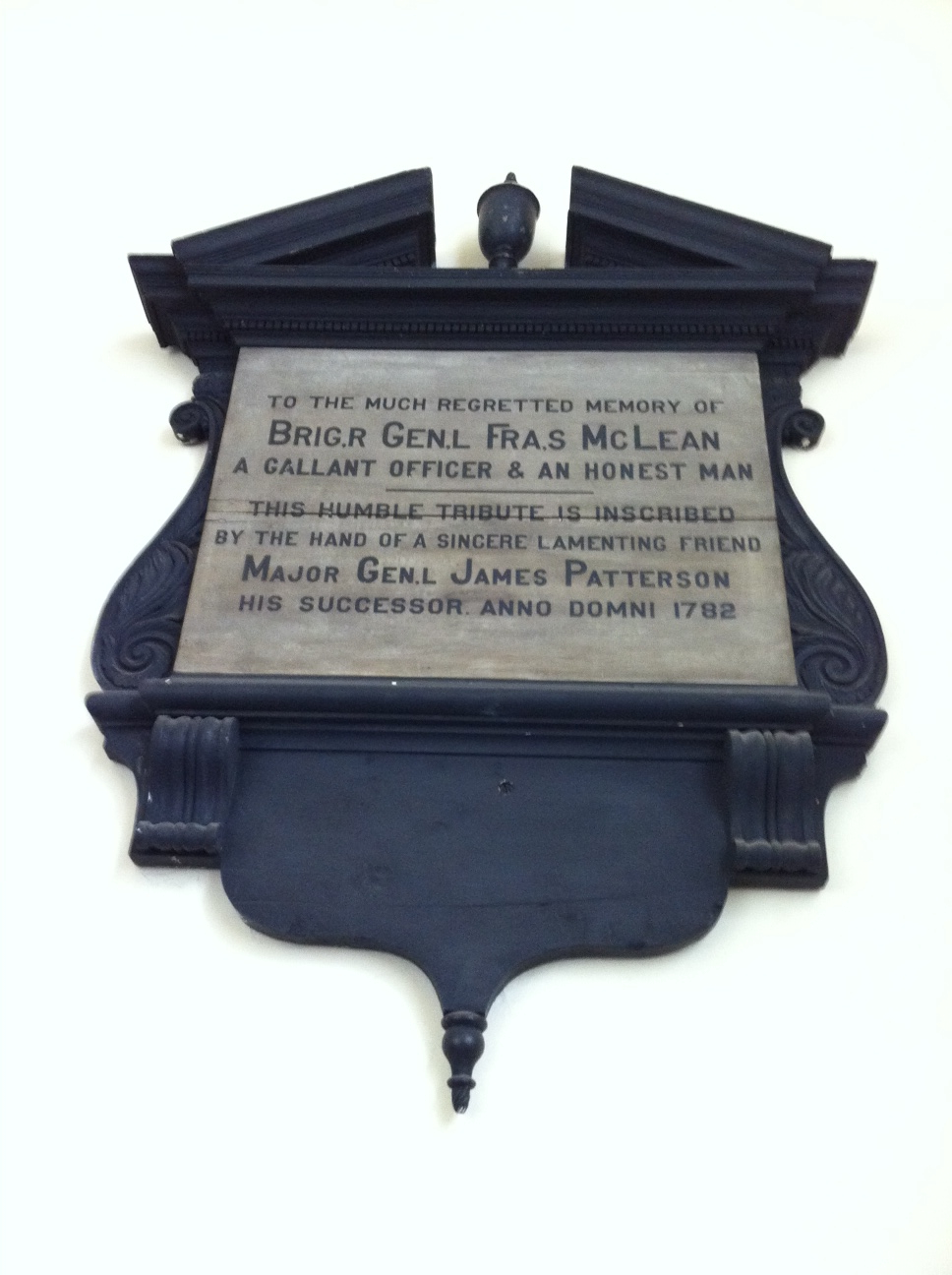
Brigadier General Francis McLean – defended New Ireland (Maine) during American Revolution, died 1781 – oldest monument in church

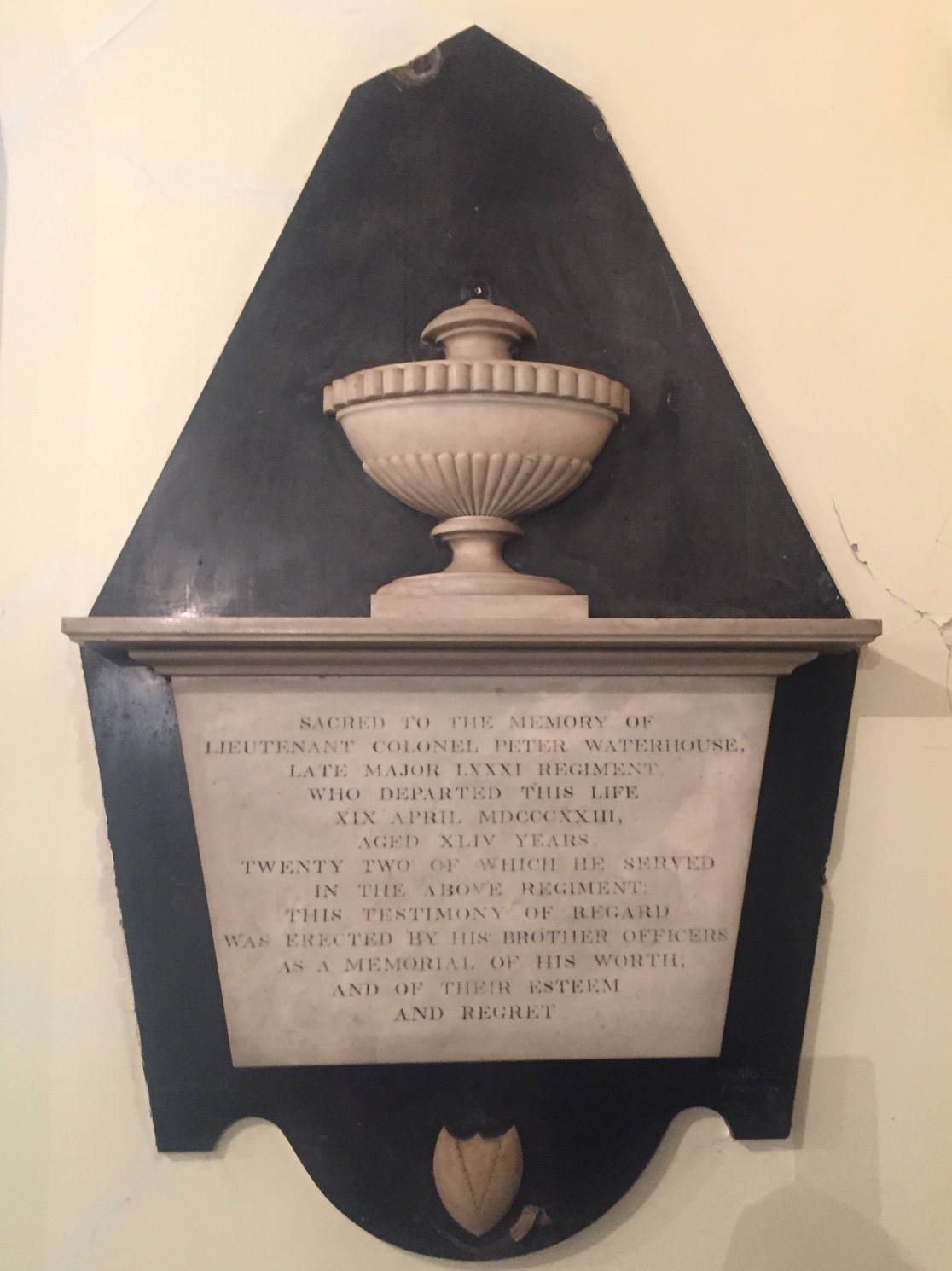
Lt.-Col. Peter Waterhouse by Lancelot Edward Wood (Chelsea, London), fought in the Battle of Corunna

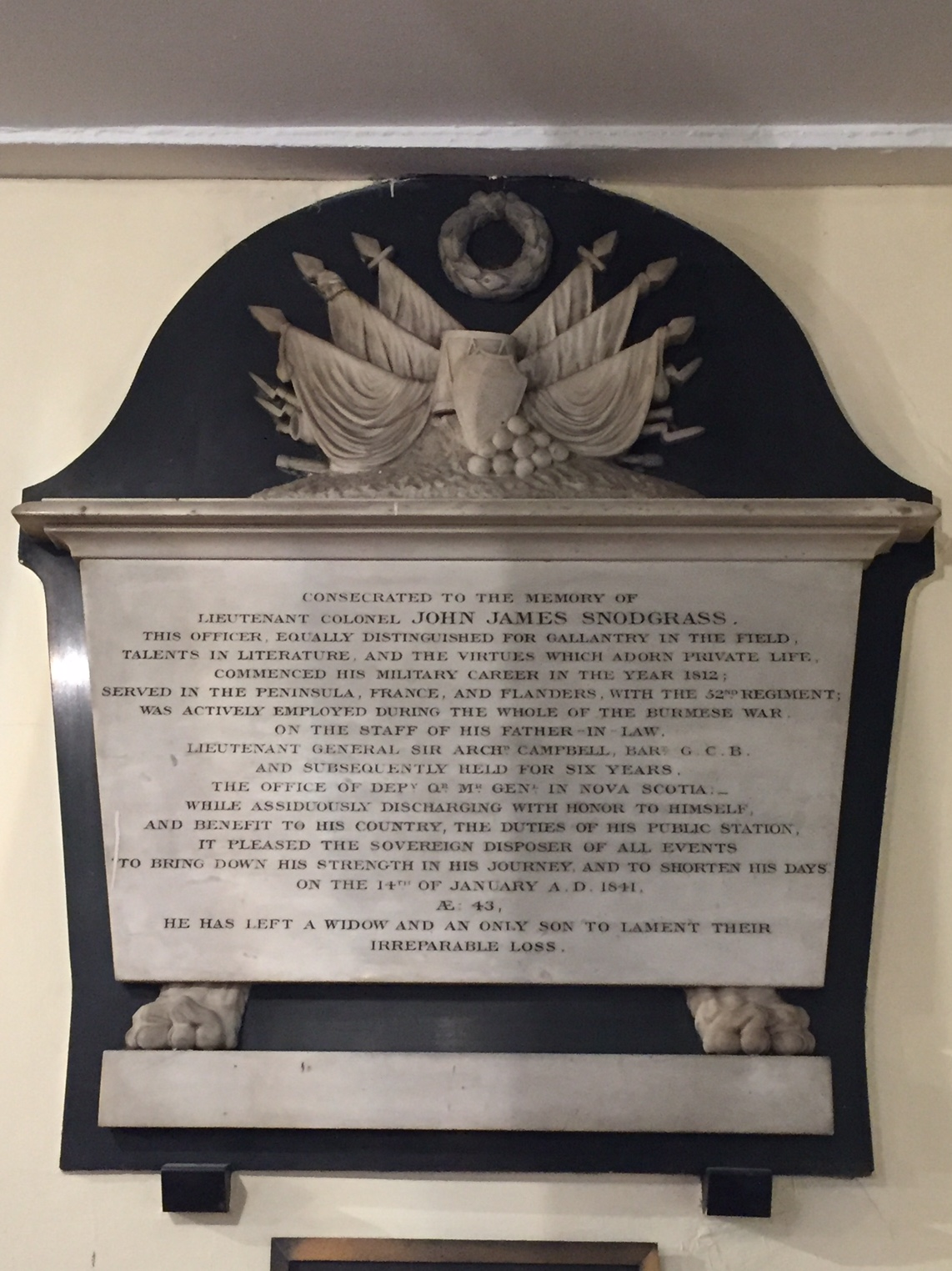
Lt.-Col. John James Snodgrass, fought in Battle of Waterloo (1815)

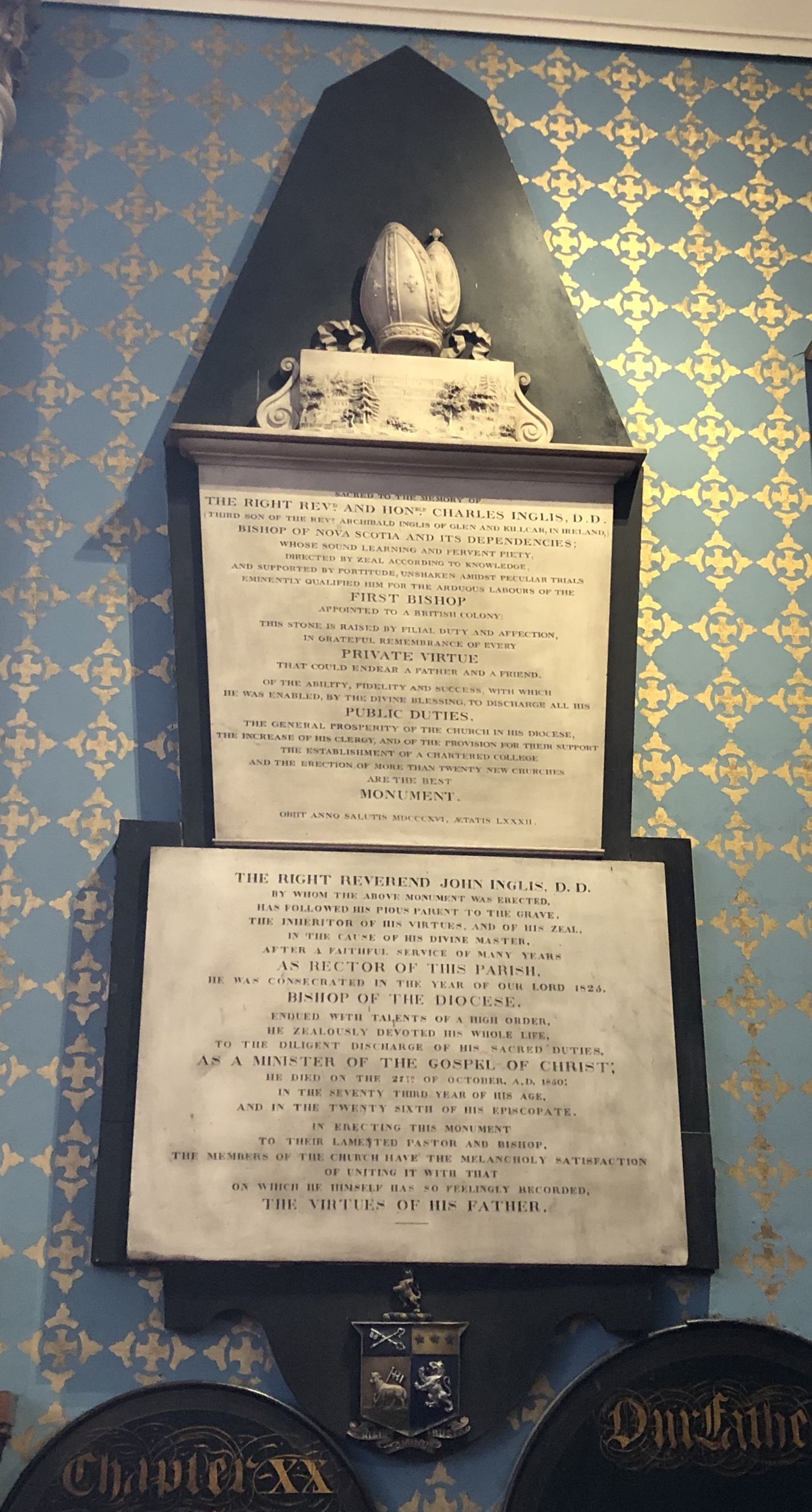
First Anglican Bishop in North America Charles Inglis

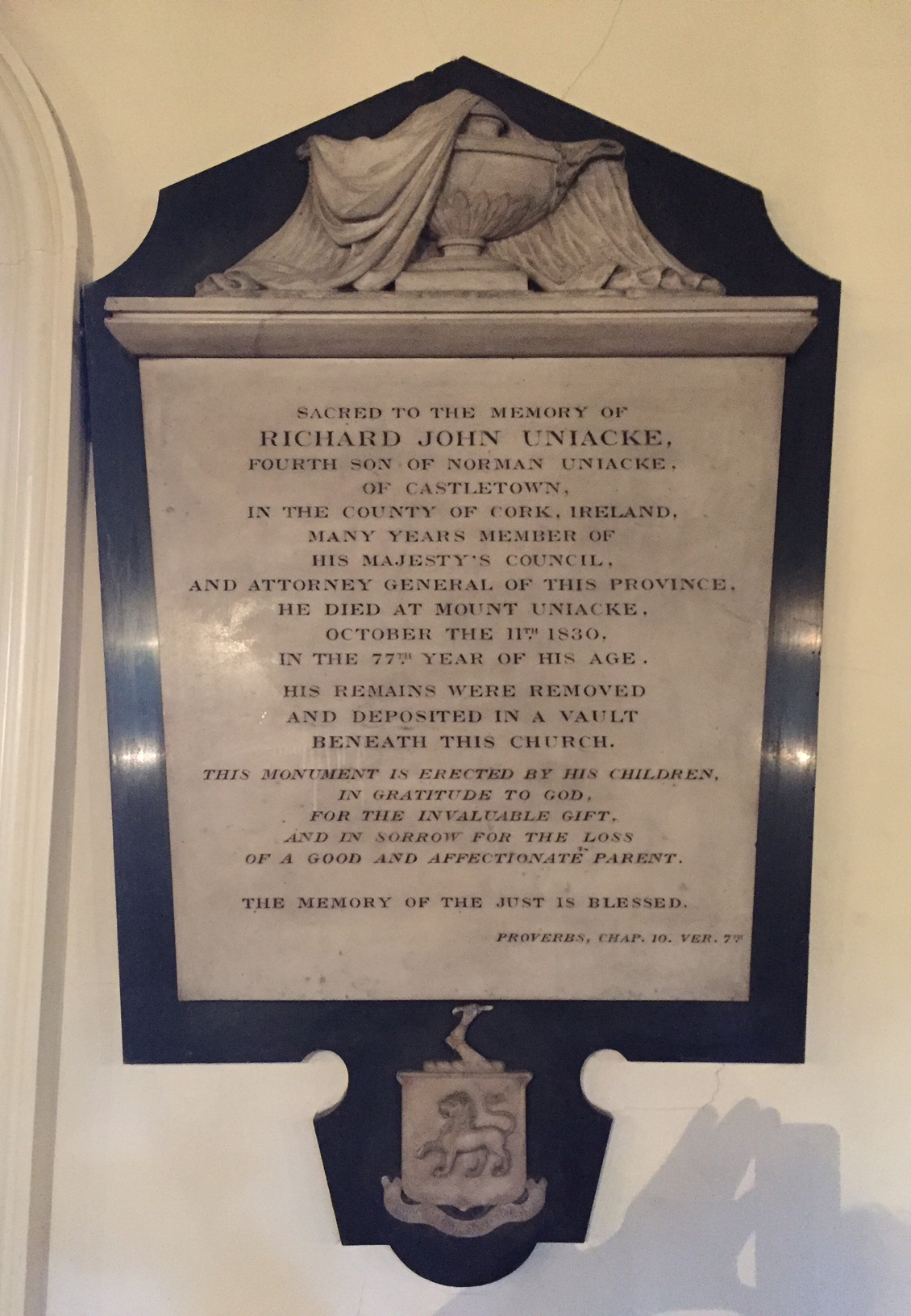
Abolitionist Attorney General Richard John Uniacke

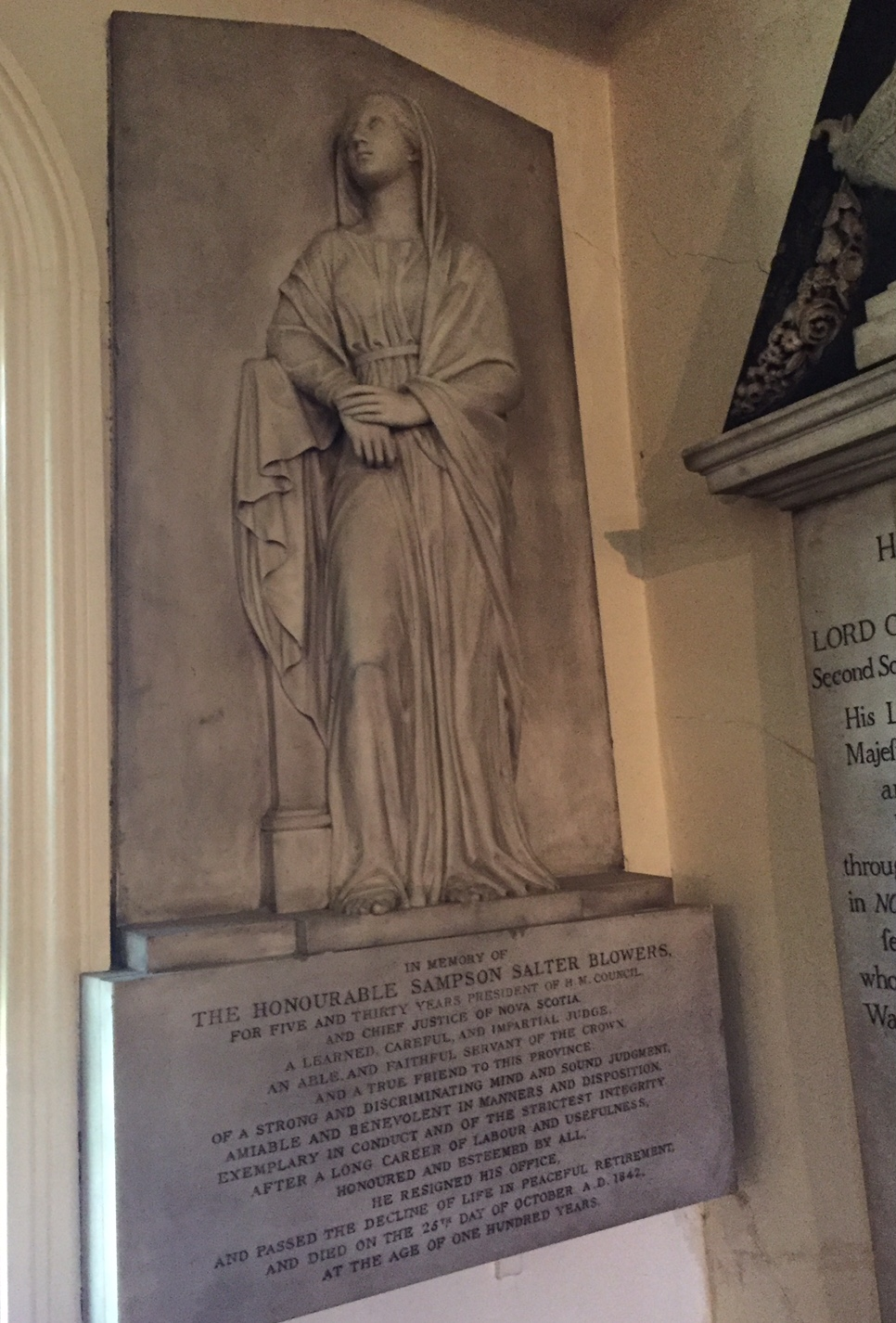
Chief Justice Sampson Salter Blowers, died 1842 – loyalist, instrumental in ending slavery in Nova Scotia

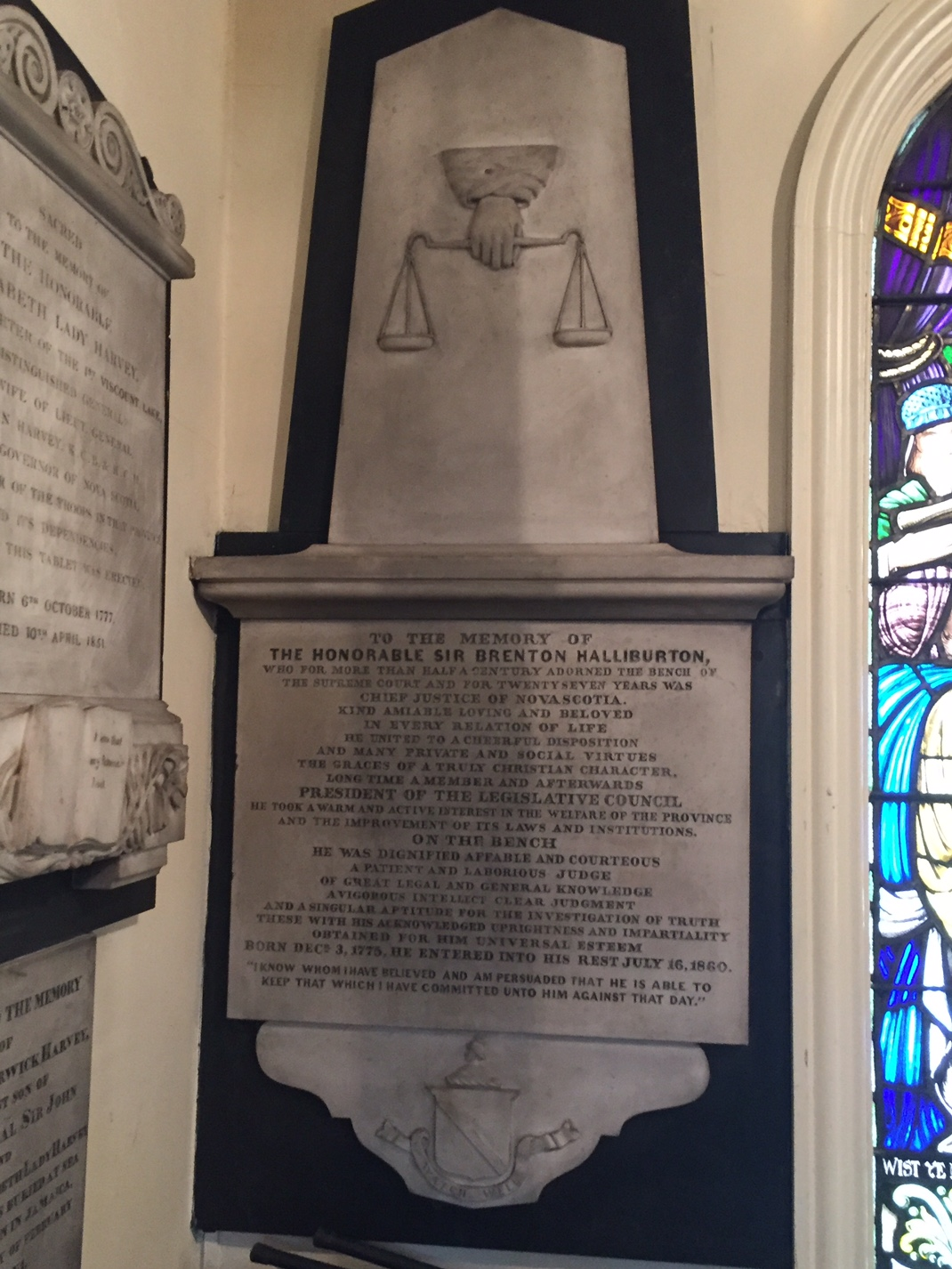
Chief Justice Brenton Halliburton, died 1860, presided over the Libel trial of Joseph Howe

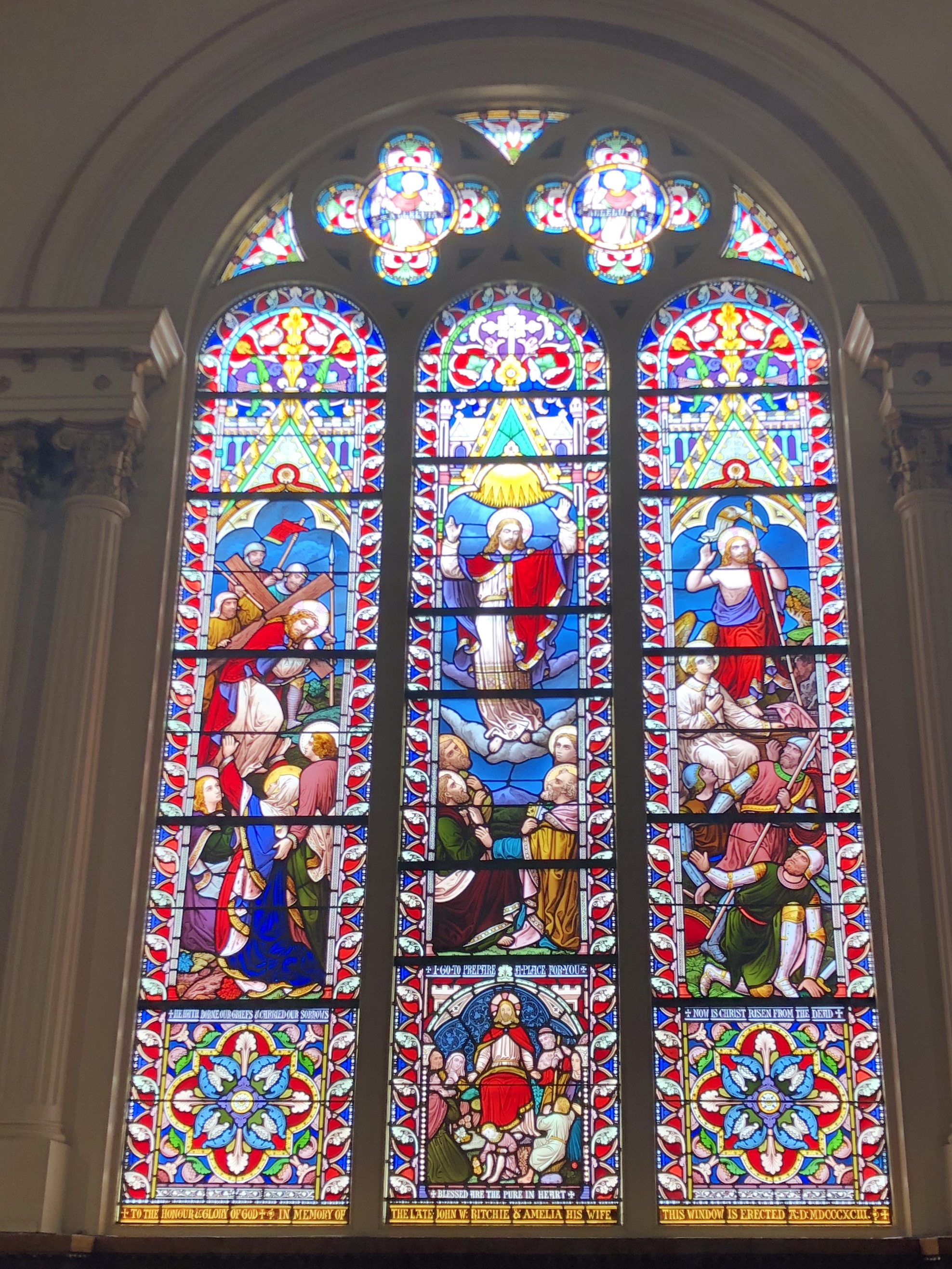
Father of Confederation Hon. John William Ritchie, died 1890

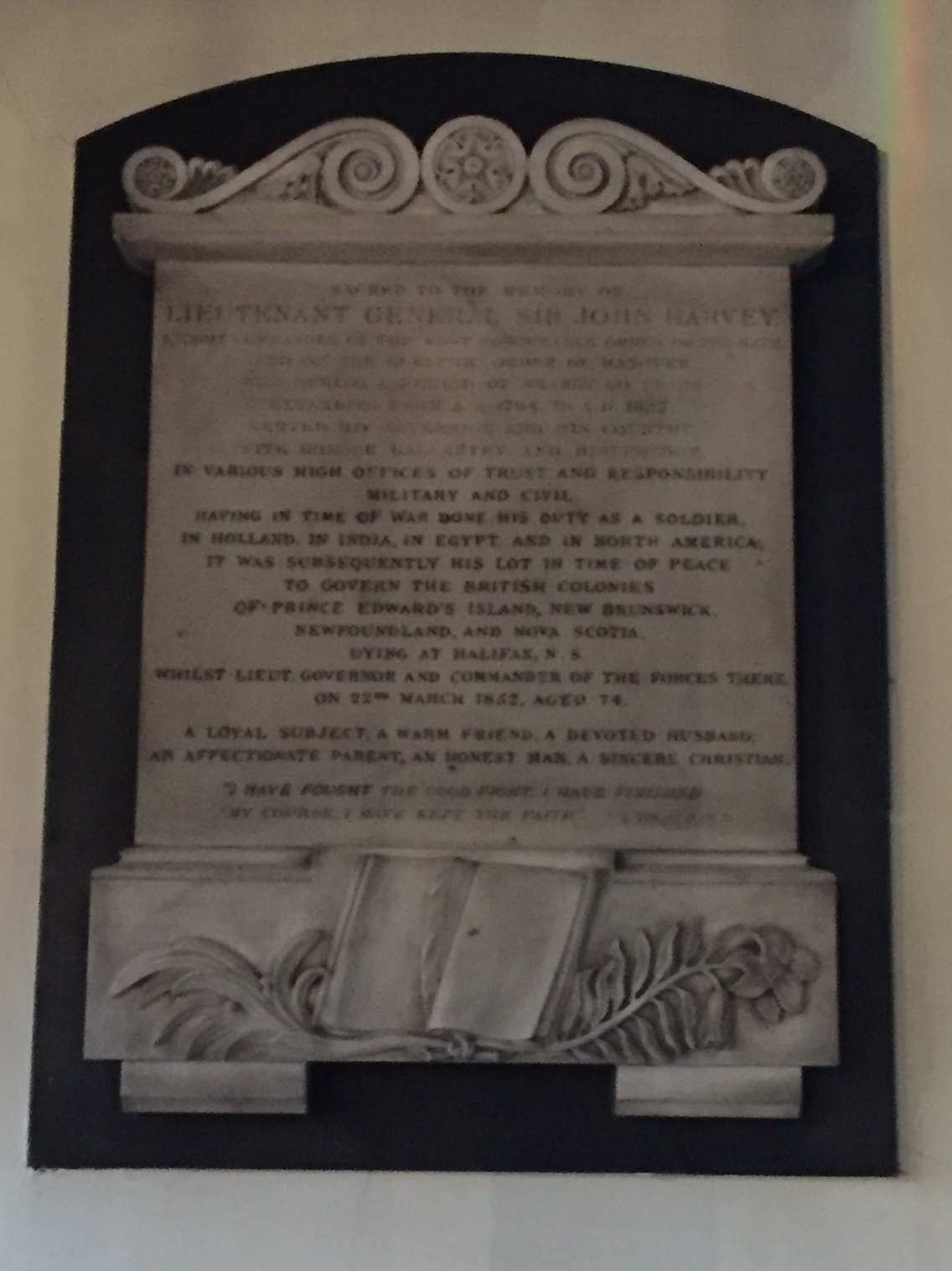
Lt. Gov. Sir John Harvey, fought in Battle of Crysler's Farm

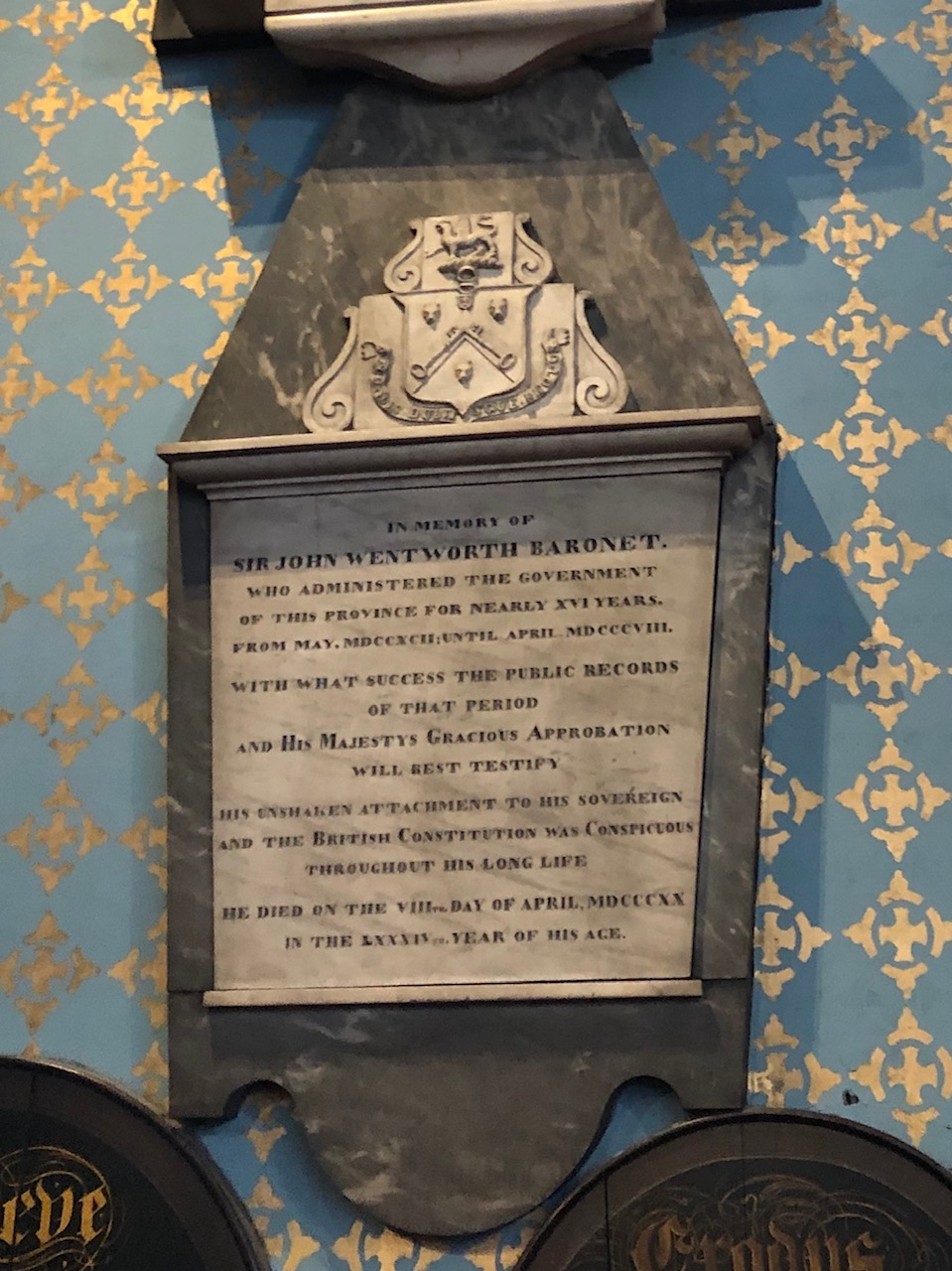
Lt. Gov. John Wentworth, Col of Royal Nova Scotia Regiment

=== Women ===
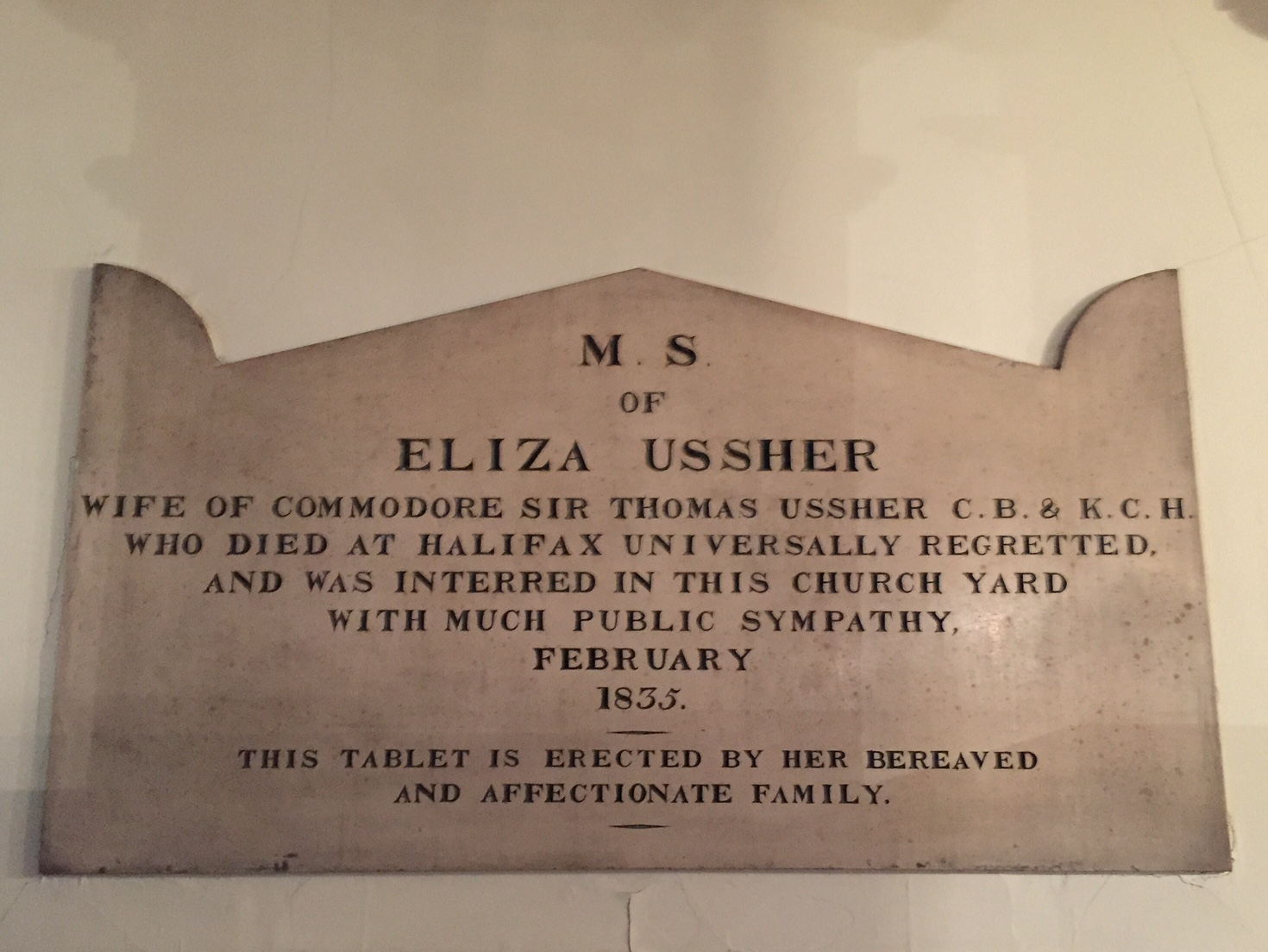
Captain Sir Thomas Ussher's wife Eliza Ussher, died 1835 (large tomb in St. Paul's cemetery)

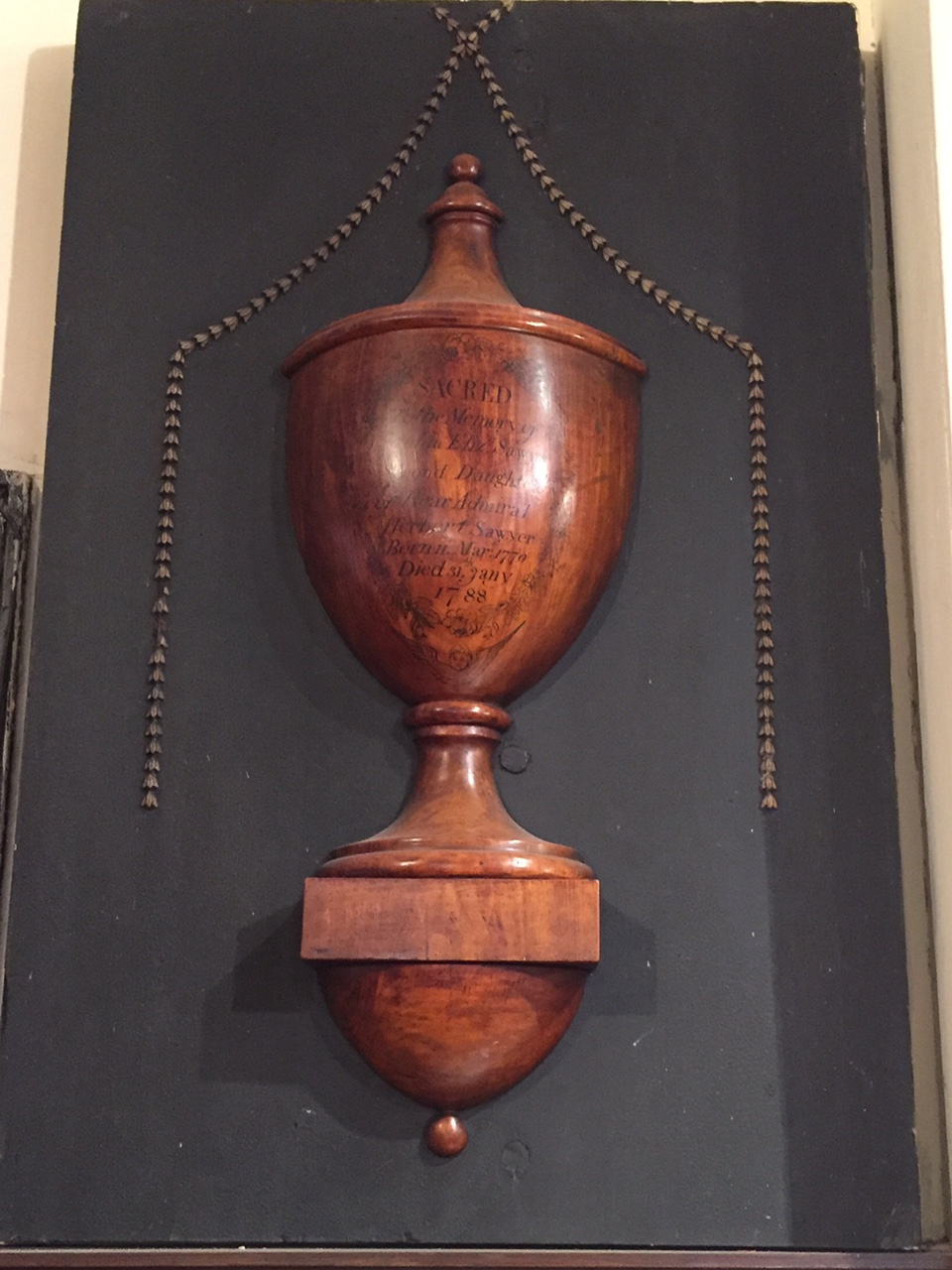
Commander-in-Chief, North American Station Rear Admiral Herbert Sawyer's daughter Sophia Sawyer, died 1788

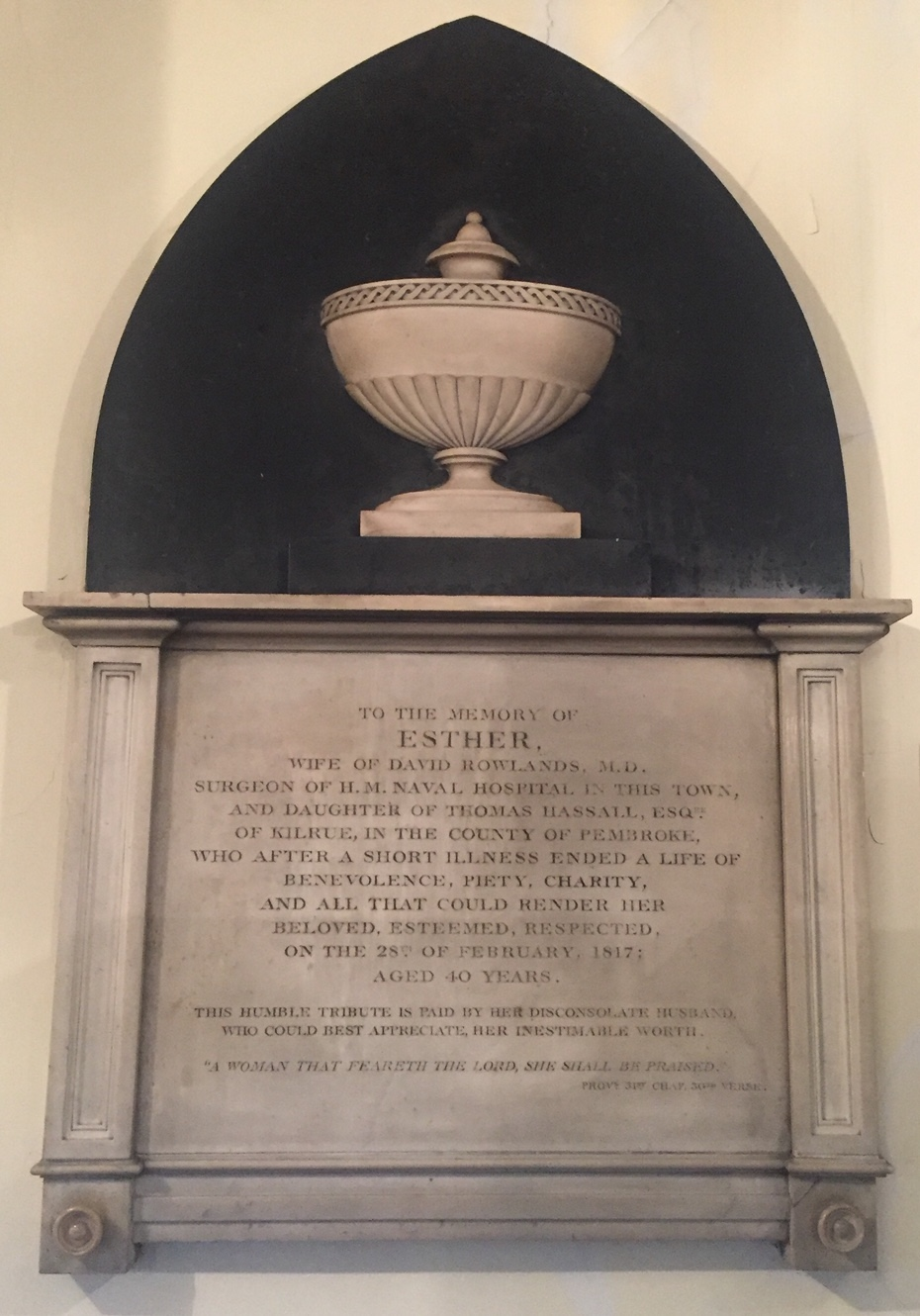
Dr. David Rowlands' wife Esther Rowlands (gravestone in St. Paul's cemetery)

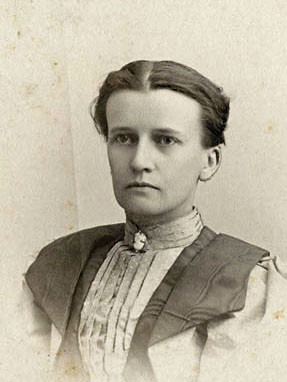
Suffragist Eliza Ritchie (d.1933) and Sisters windows

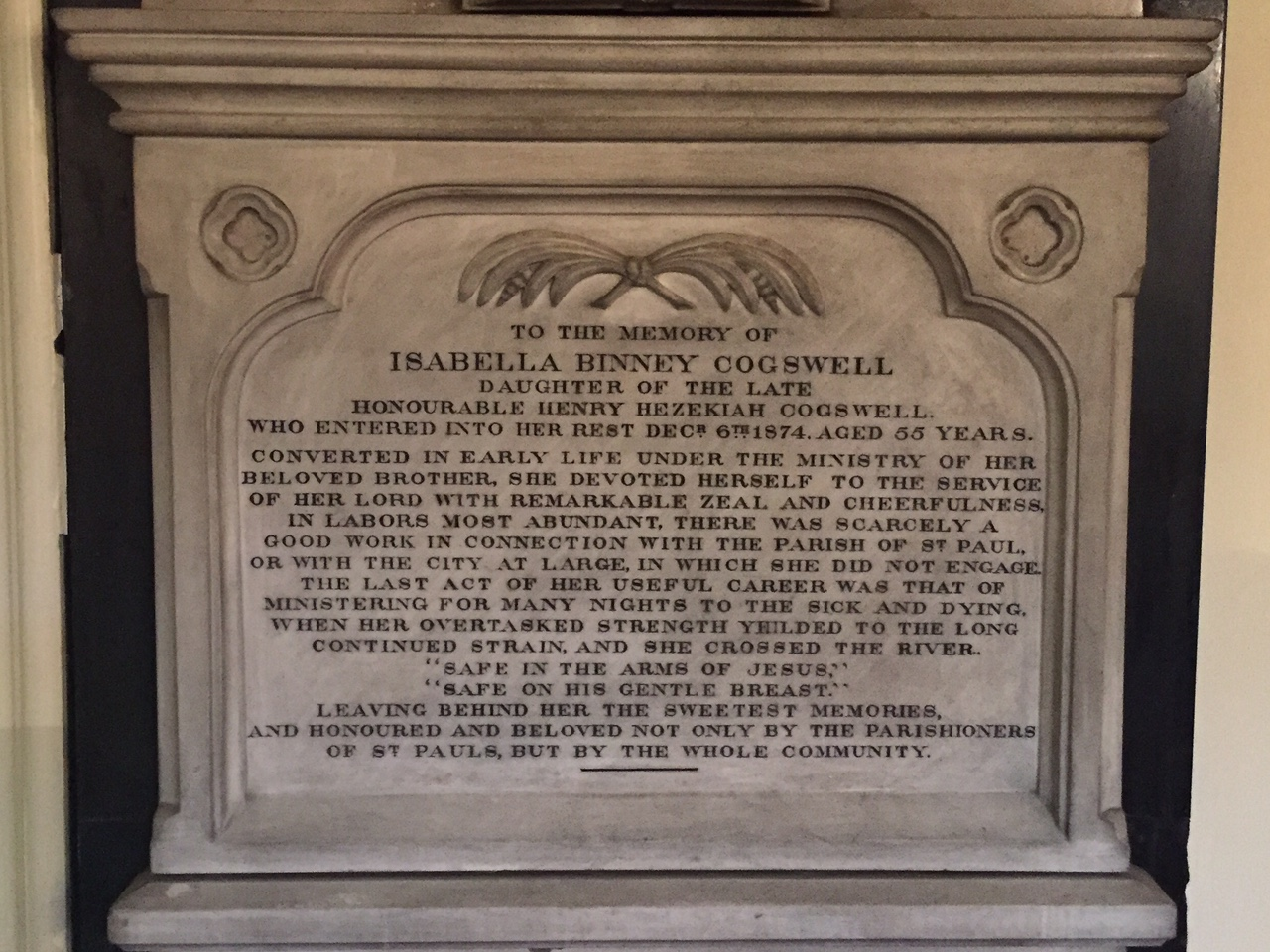
Philanthropist and Business woman Isabella Binney Cogswell, died1874

=== Silver communion service ===
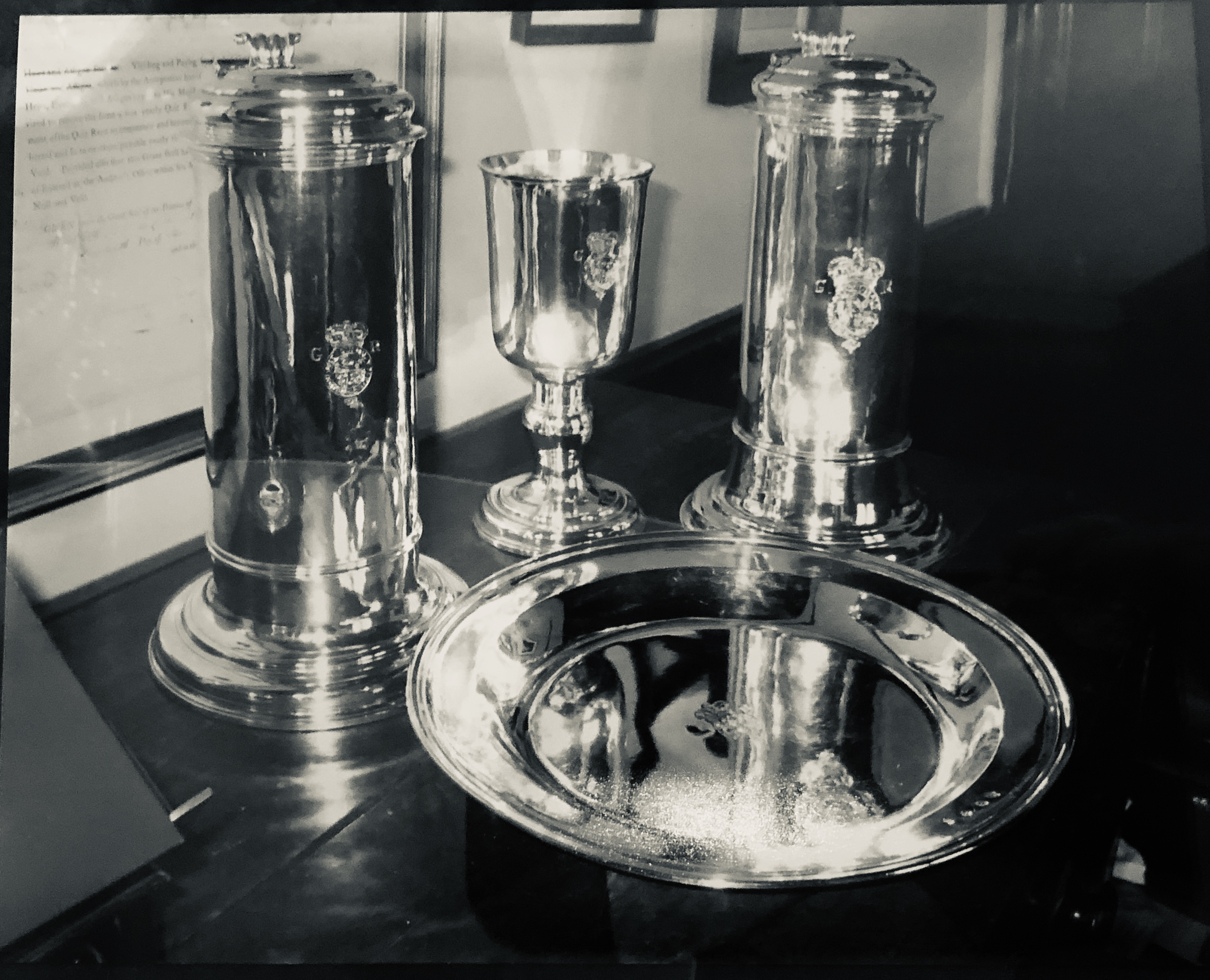
Queen Anne silver Communion Service by Francis Garthorne, St. Paul's Church, Halifax, Nova Scotia

The service originally consisted of five pieces: four pieces have the mark of King George I (2 flagons, a Chalice and an alms receiver). Two of these pieces also have the mark of Queen Anne (a flagon and the alms receiver), which are dated 1713. The fifth piece – the paten – was damaged and melted down around 1819. All the pieces are made from Britannia silver. In 1783, Governor Parr had the service given to St. Paul's.

The silversmith Francis Garthorne (1641–1729) marked all of the pieces with a "G" encircling a small Roman capital A. Garthorne's work is in the collections of Metropolitan Museum of Art, New York City, the Museum of Fine Arts, Boston, and the Royal Collection Trust. He created five of the ten Ceremonial maces now on display in the Jewel House at the Tower of London.

=== Sculptures ===
Some of the monuments in the church showcase sculptures by England's leading sculptors during the nineteenth century. All of whom exhibited their work at the Royal Academy of Arts and have their work in the National Portrait Gallery (London), the Tate, Museum of Fine Arts, Boston, Massachusetts State House, Trafalgar Square, St Paul's Cathedral, Buckingham Palace and Westminster Abbey.

There are two stone carvings by Samuel Nixon, one of a shipwreck and the other of the Parable of the Good Samaritan. Nixon was commissioned by the City of London to create a statue of King William IV (1844), which Gentleman's Magazine called "a masterpiece" and an example of "artistic genius."

Another sculpture was created by Sir Francis Leggatt Chantrey (for Amelia Ann Smyth). Chantrey's most notable works include the statues of King George IV (Trafalgar Square); King George III (Guildhall), and George Washington (Massachusetts State House). He also executed four monuments to military heroes for St Paul's Cathedral. (Chantrey's sculpture of Sir Walter Scott was commissioned for Victoria Park, Halifax, Nova Scotia.)

There is also a sculpture by Richard Westmacott III (for Sampson Salter Blowers). Westmacoott was the son of Sir Richard Westmacott. Among Westmacott III's most notable works is the pediment of the Royal Exchange (London); the monument commemorating Sir John Franklin (Greenwich Hospital). (Westmacott's uncle architect John Westmacott (d. 1816) is buried in the Old Burying Ground in Halifax, Nova Scotia.)

There is a sculpture in St. Paul's Church by John Gibson (for Richard John Uniacke, Jr.) and a monument by William F. Woodington (Henry Hezekiah Cogswell's monument to his children). Woodington's work includes statues on Westminster Bridge, Nelson's Column (Trafalgar Square), St. Paul's Cathedral, and the House of Lords.

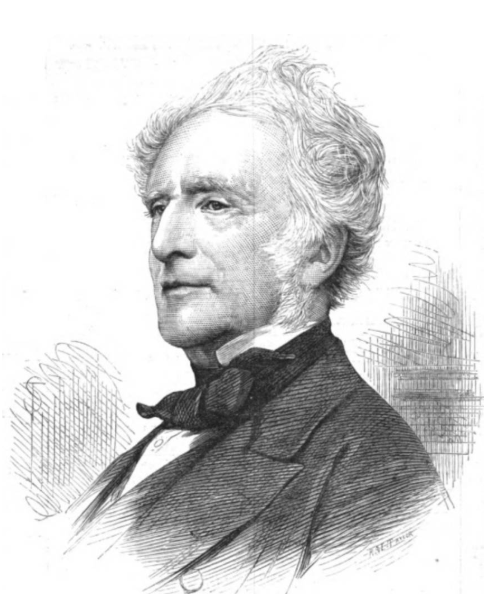
Richard Westmacott III (1799–1872)

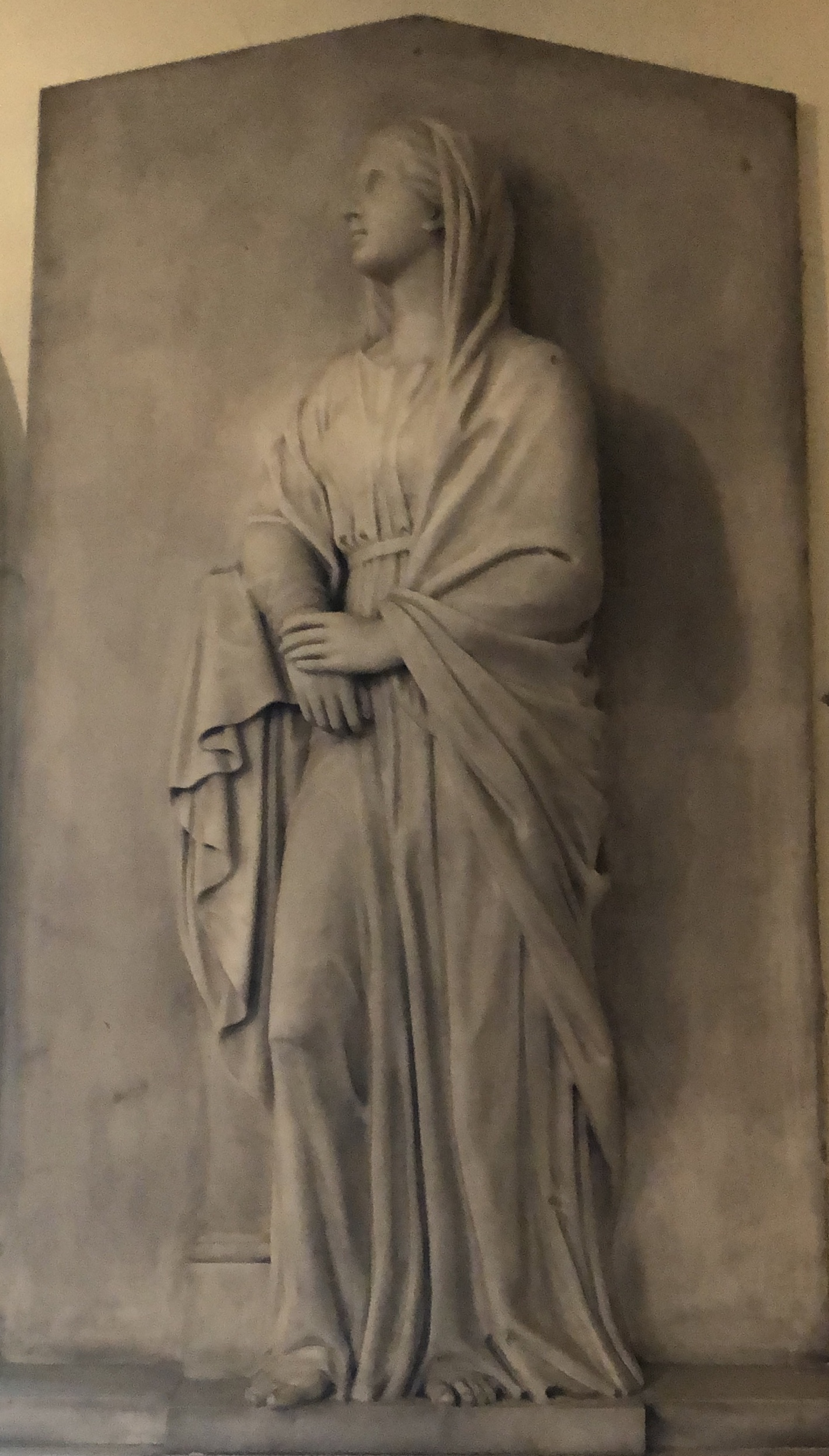
Monument by Richard Westmacott III (for Sampson Salter Blowers, 1842)

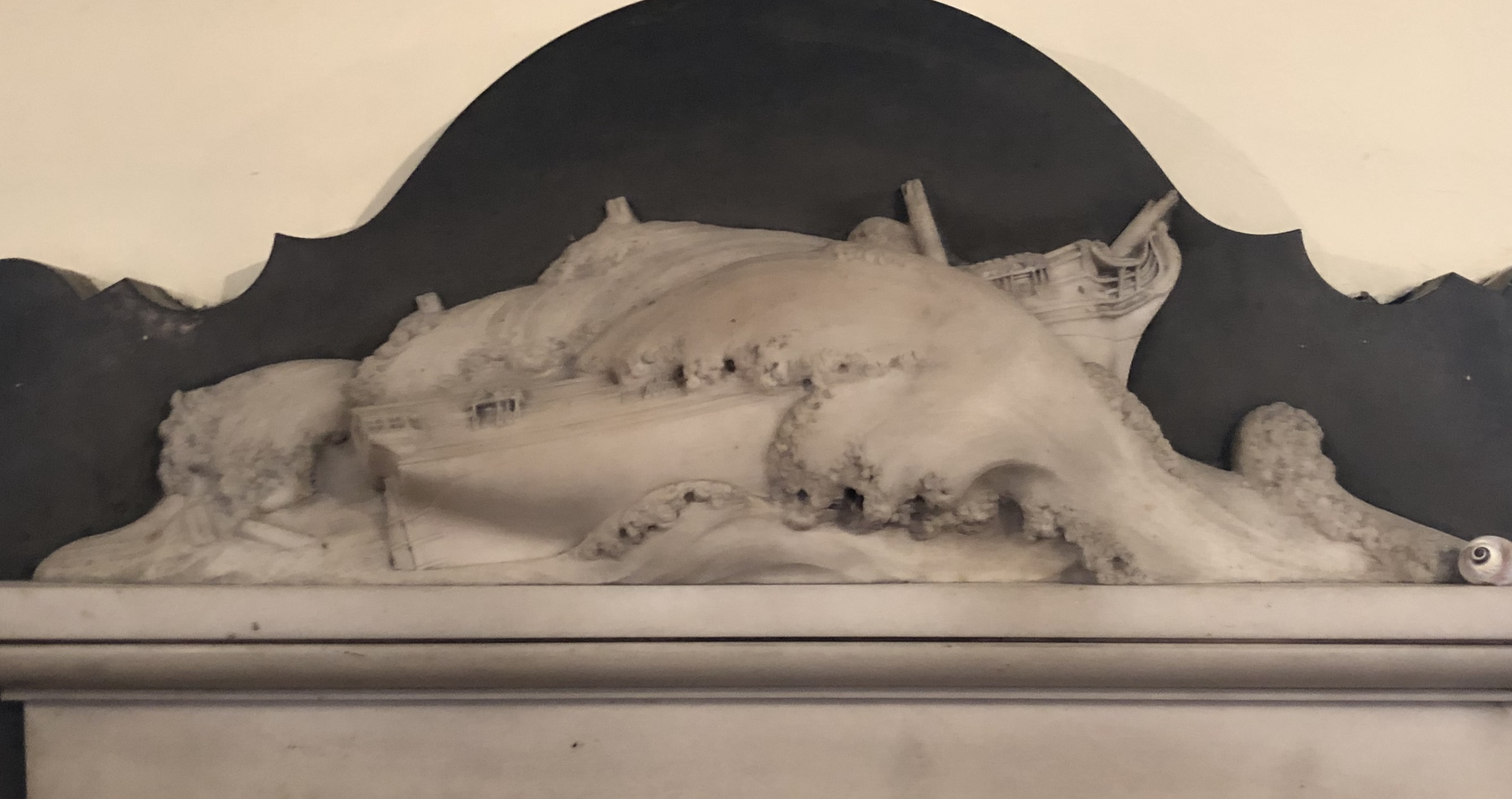
Shipwreck by Samuel Nixon (for Hibbert Newton Binney's son and 11 lost crew) (1835)

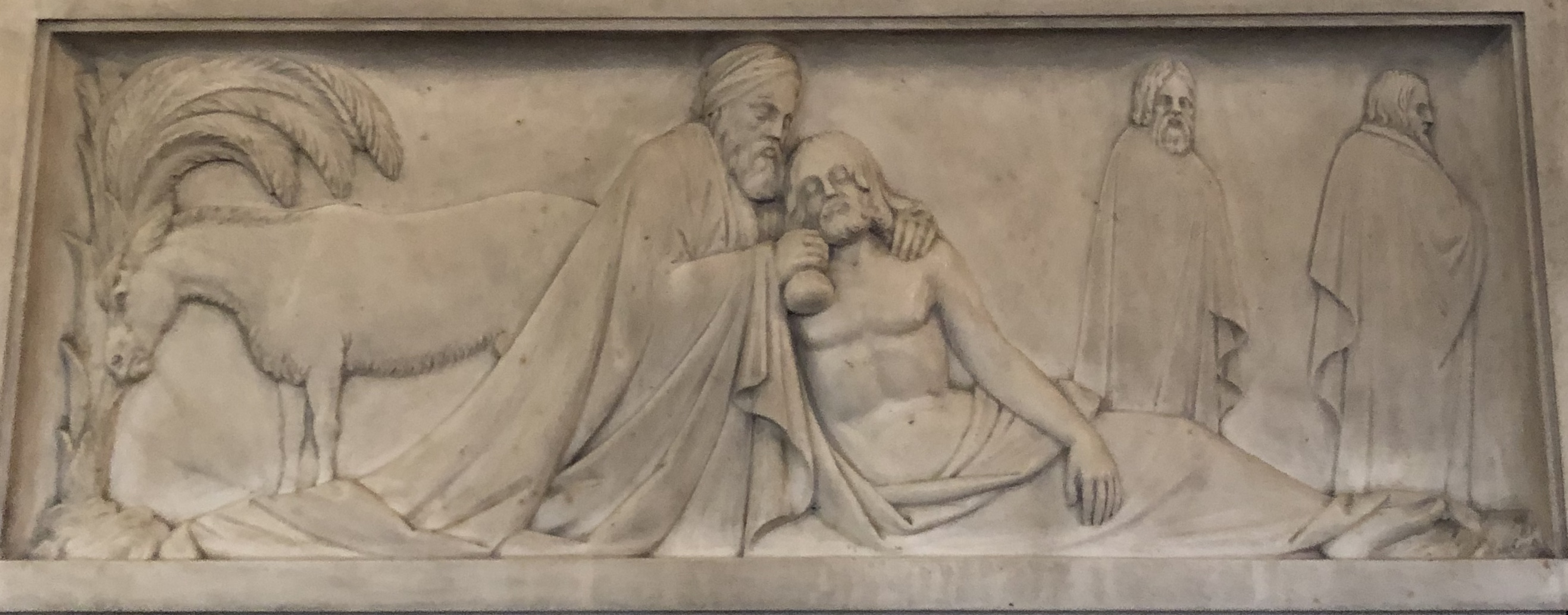
Parable of the Good Samaritan by Samuel Nixon (for William Bruce Almon, 1840)

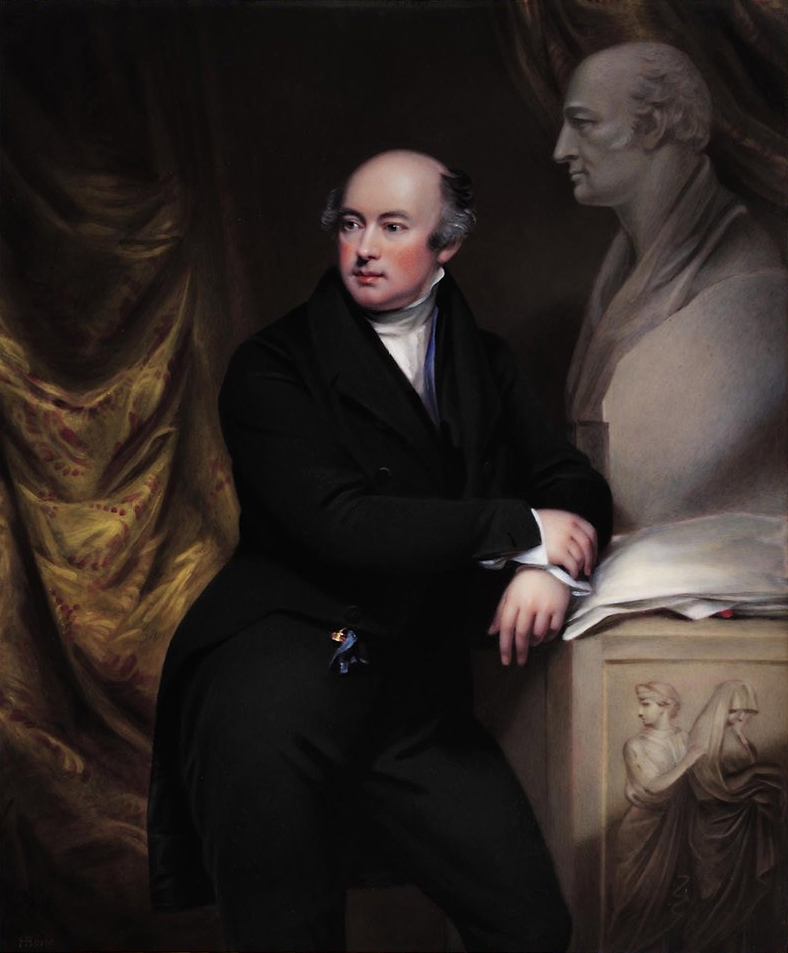
Francis Leggatt Chantrey

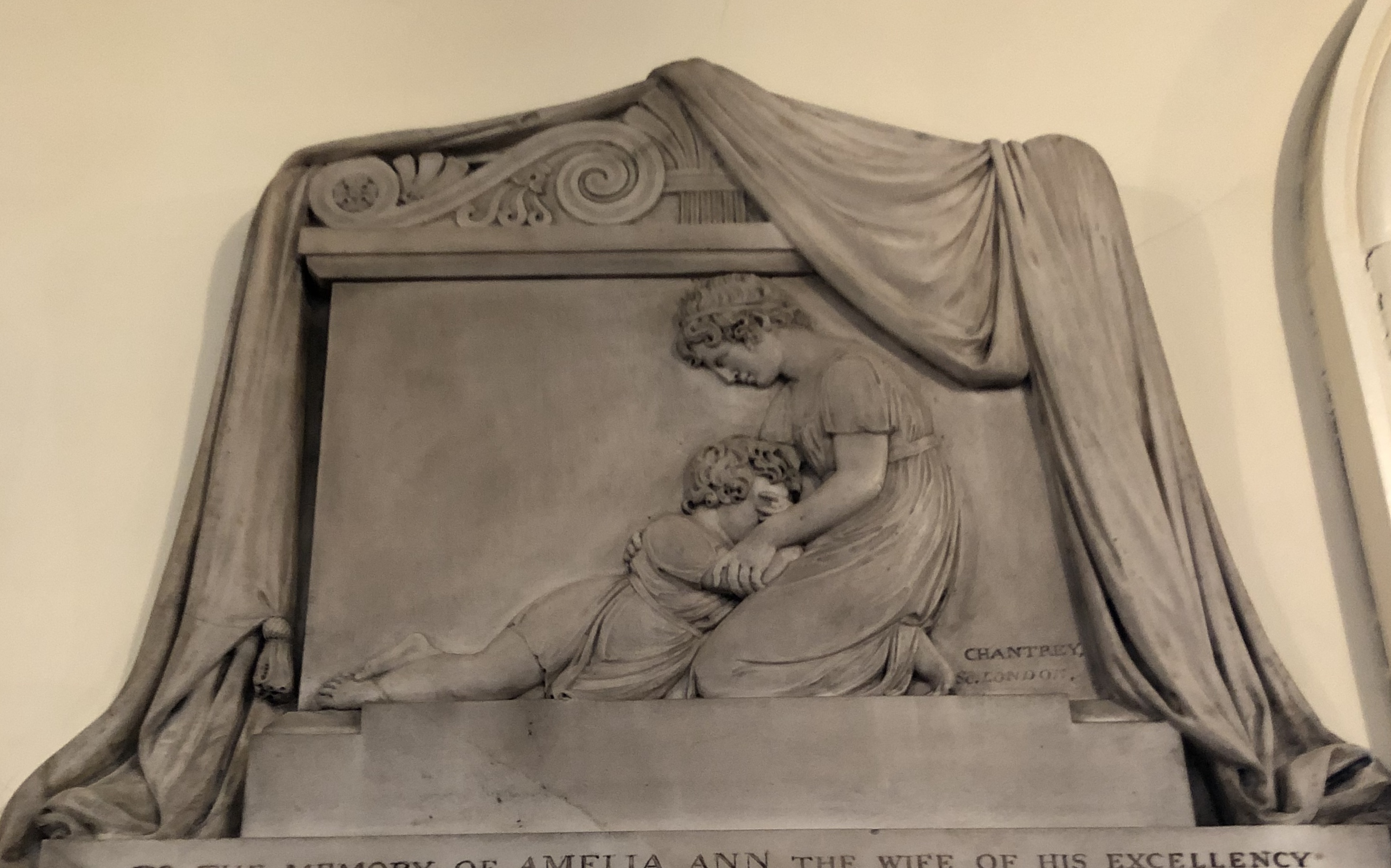
Monument by Sir Francis Leggatt Chantrey (for George Stracey Smyth's wife, 1817)

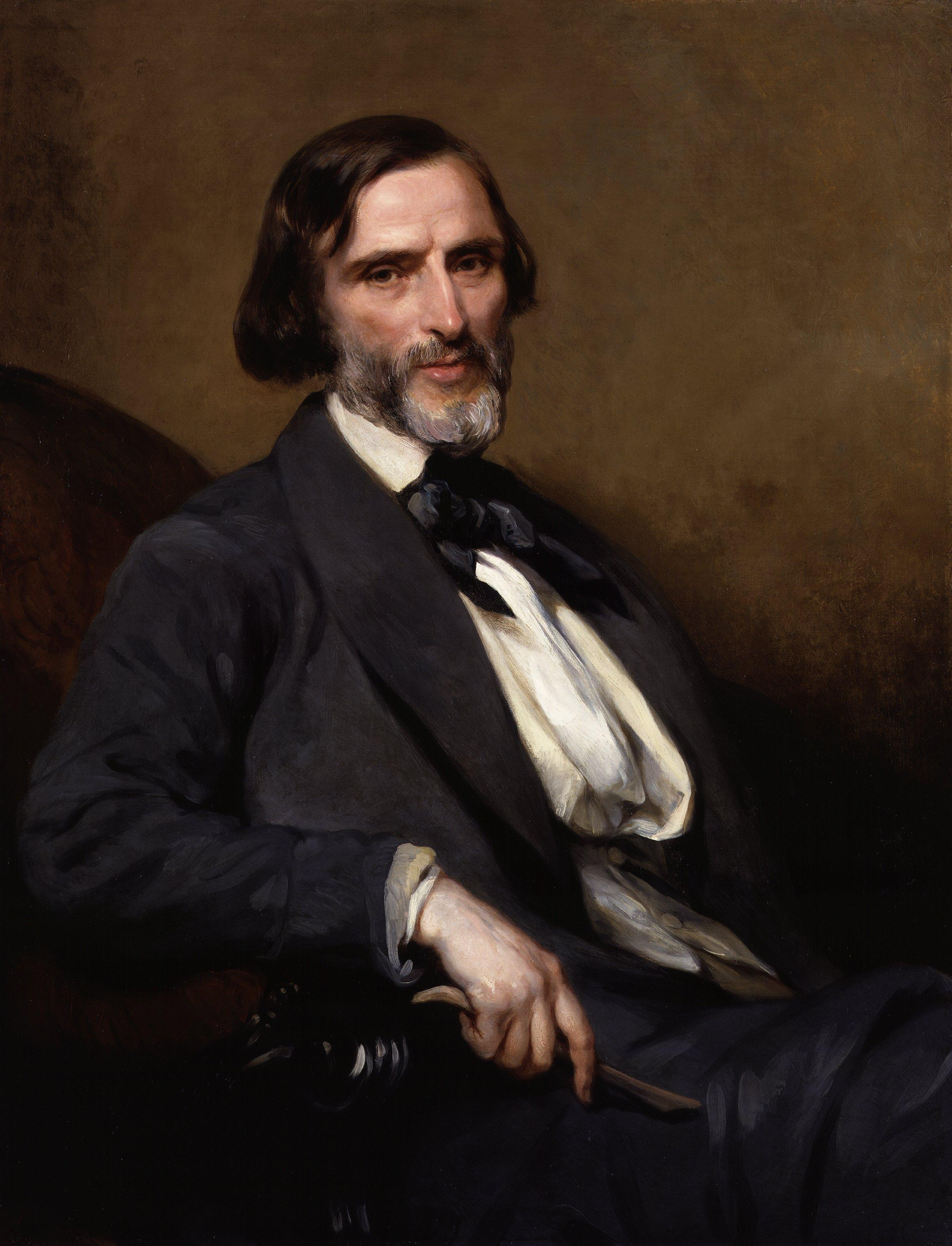
John Gibson

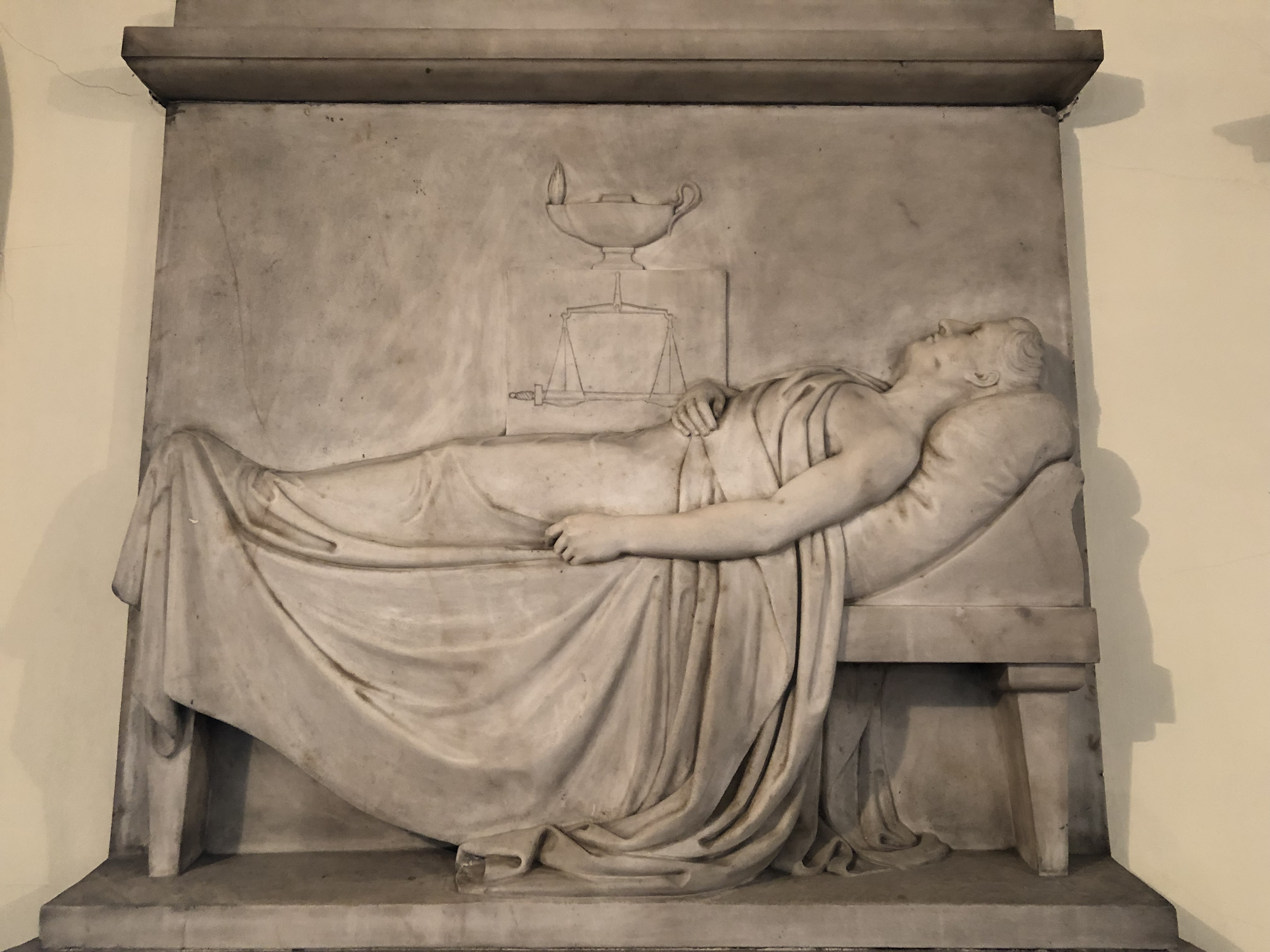
Monument by John Gibson, Via Fontanella Studio, Rome (for Richard John Uniacke, Jr., 1834)

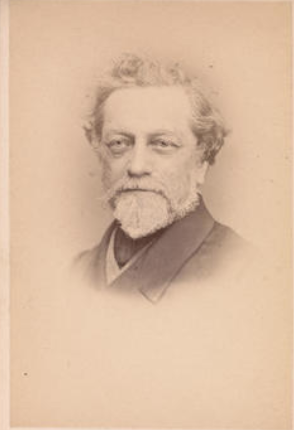
William F. Woodington (1806–1893)

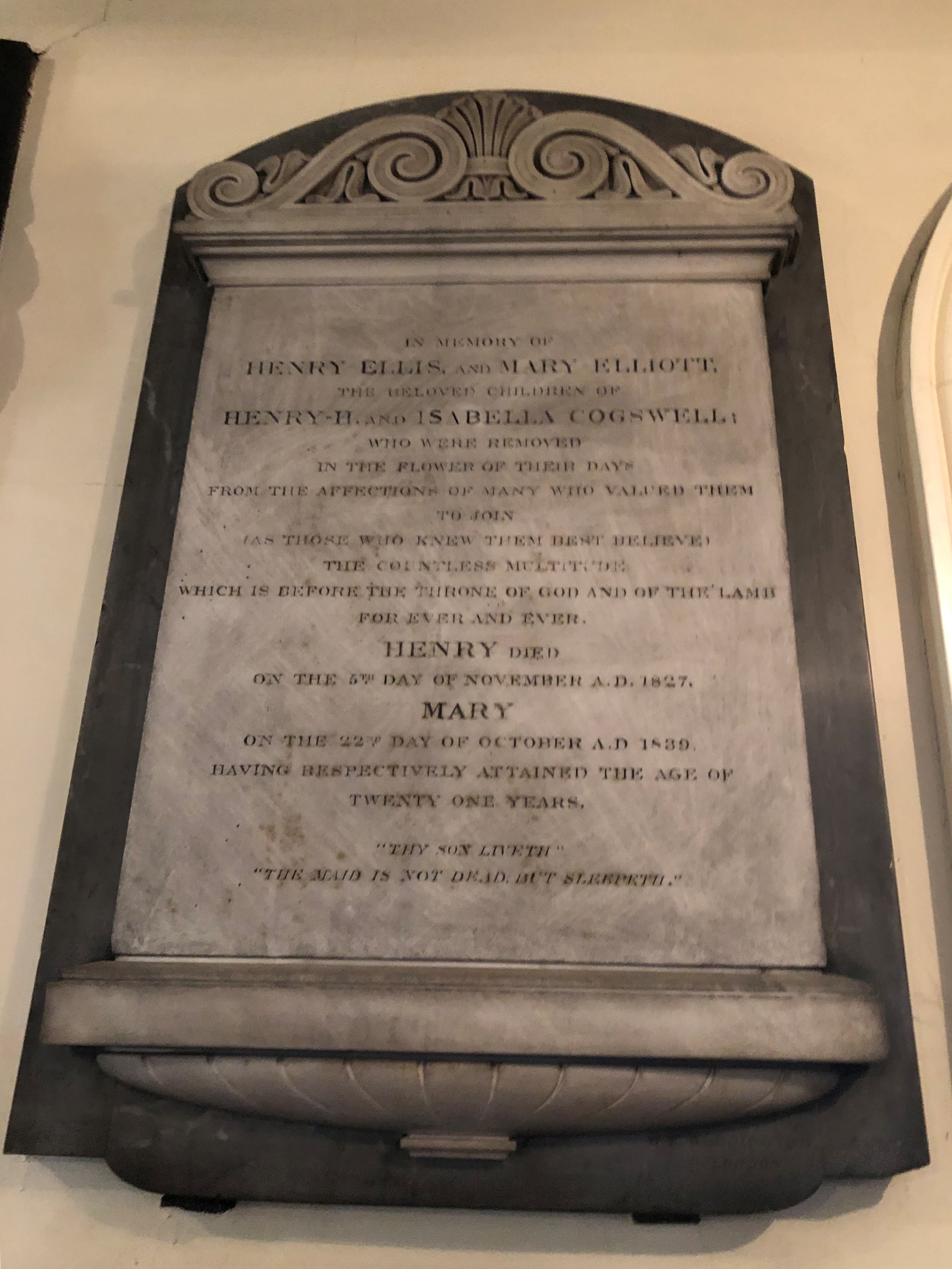
William F. Woodington (for Henry Hezekiah Cogswell's monument to his children, 1839)

== Ministers (1749–1824) ==
- Rev. William Tutty (1749–1752) and his assistant, Rev. William Anwyl (1749–1750),
- Rev. Jean-Baptiste Moreau (clergyman) (1750–1753) took on the role of Tutty's assistant; later became the 1st minister of St. John's Anglican Church (Lunenburg)
- Rev. Thomas Wood (1752–1764) (assistant); 1st minister at Annapolis; buried at Garrison Cemetery (Annapolis Royal, Nova Scotia)
- Rev. John Breynton (1753–1791), first Rector
- Charles Inglis, 1st Bishop of Nova Scotia, (1781), only minister buried in crypt
- Rev. Joshua Wingate Weeks (1785–1791), brother-in-law of Rev. Jacob Bailey
- Rev. Robert Stanser (1791–1816), 2nd Bishop – his wife Mary Stanser, died 1815, is buried in the crypt
- Rev. John Inglis (1816–1824), 3rd Bishop (appointed 1825, father of John Eardley Inglis).
- Rev. John Thomas Twining (curate) (1817)
- Rev. William Cogswell (minister) (Henry Hezekiah Cogswell's son) (curate), (1833–1847)
- Rev. Robert Willis (minister) (1824–1865)
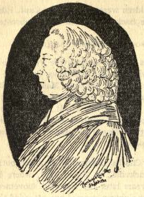
Reverend Thomas Wood (1752–1764)

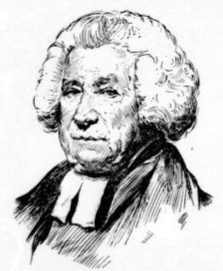
John Breynton

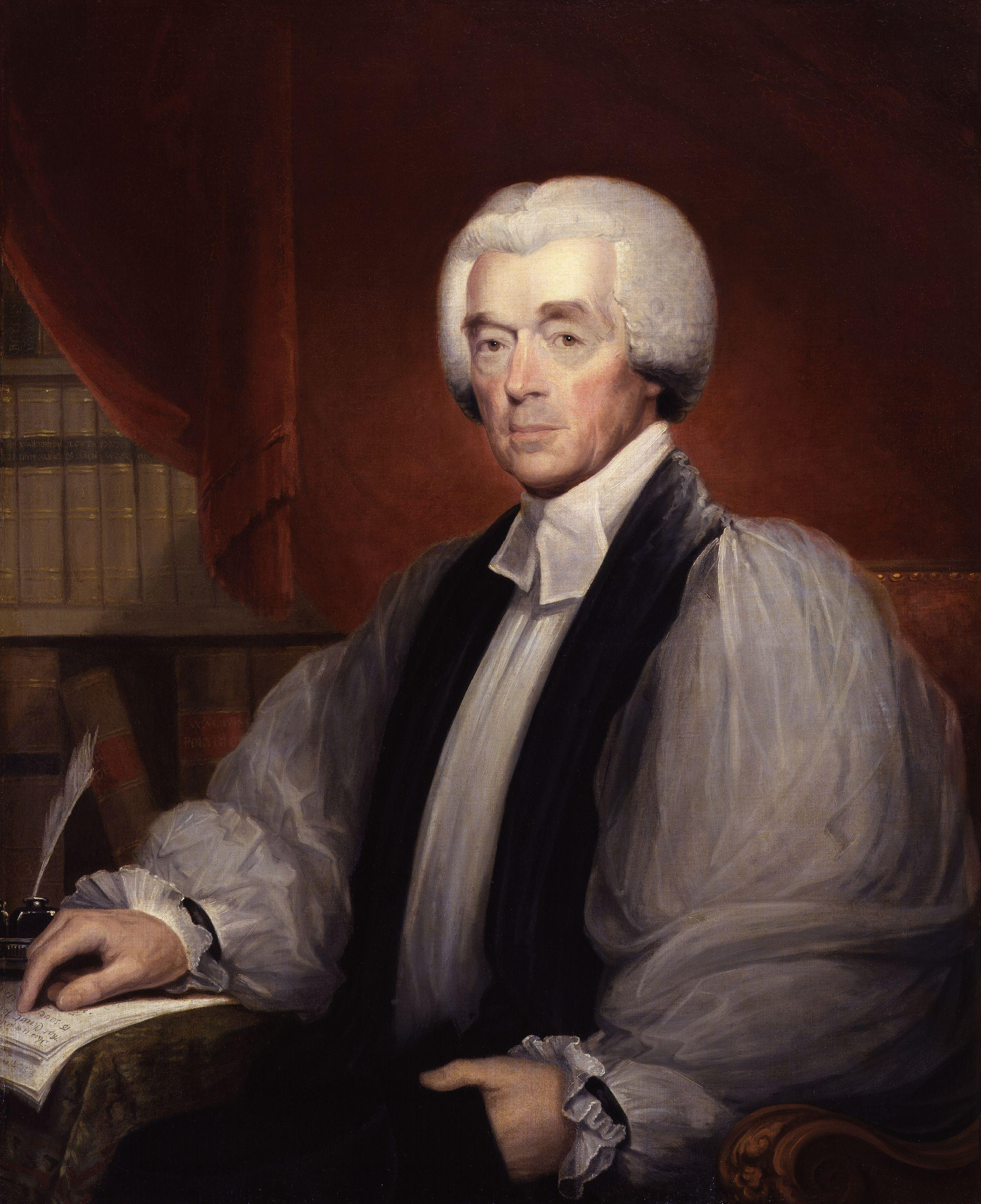
Charles Inglis. died 1816, 1st bishop

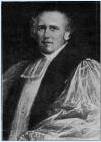
Rev. Robert Stanser, 2nd Bishop

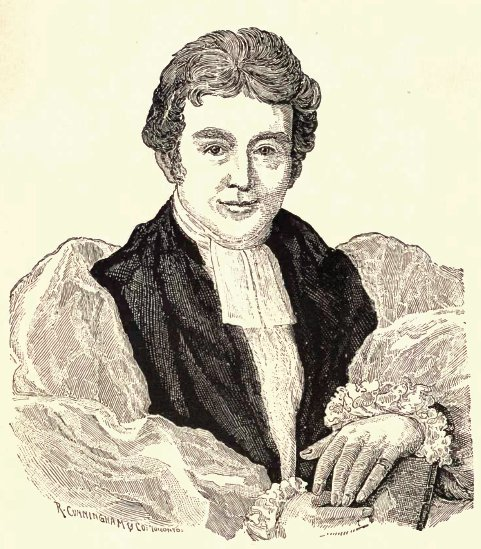
Rev. John Inglis, 3rd Bishop

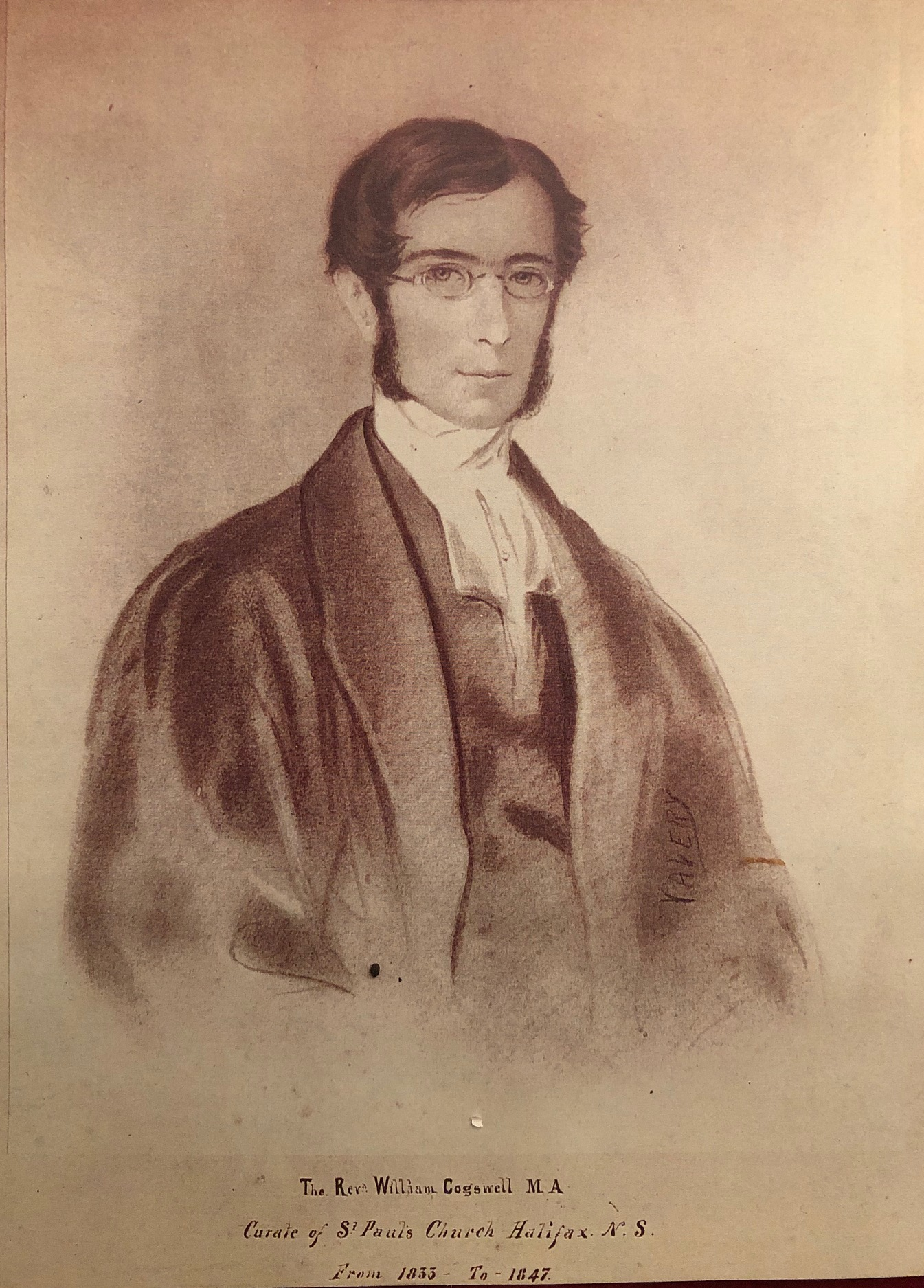
Rev. William Cogswell, St. Paul's Church, Halifax, Nova Scotia

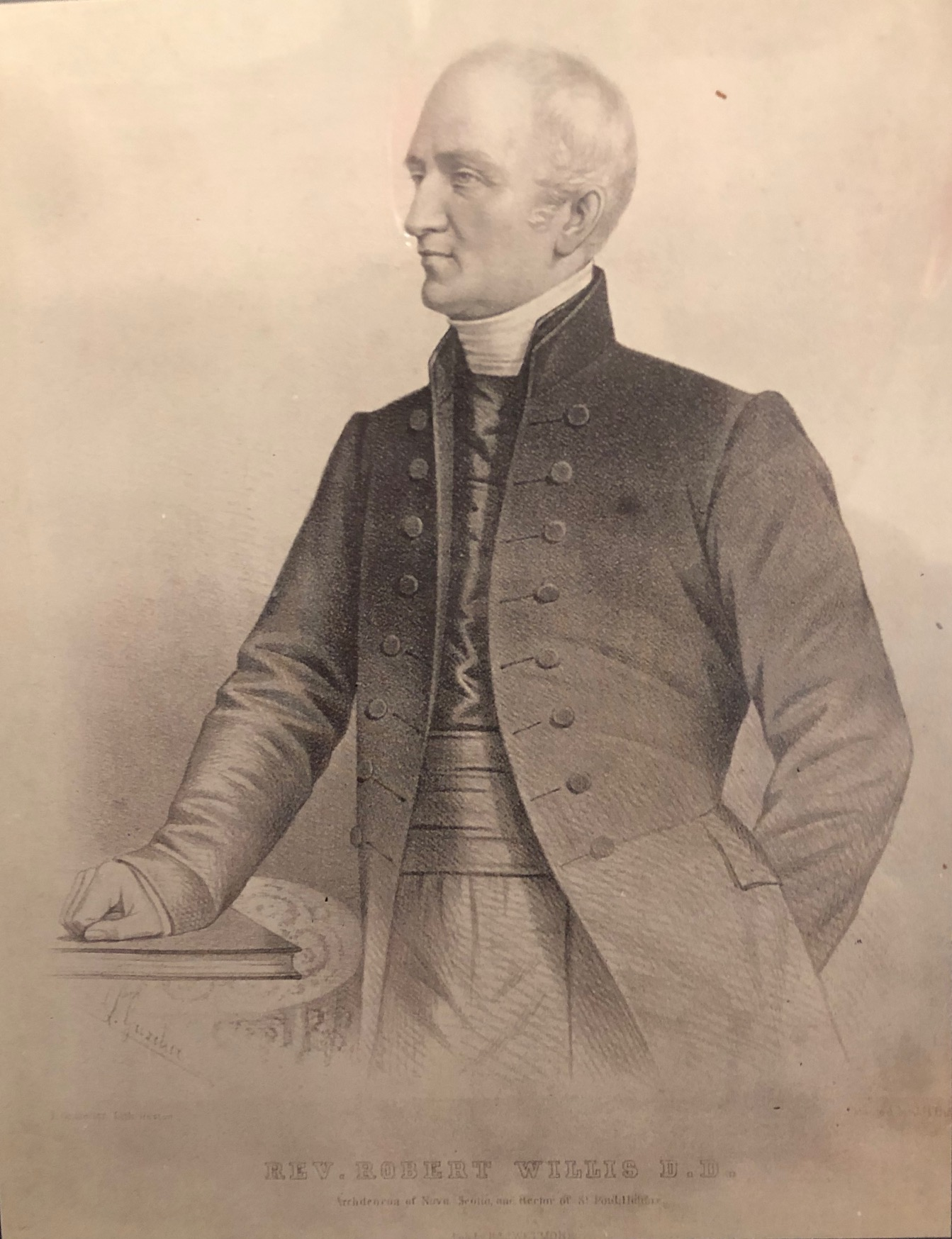
Rev. Robert Willis, St. Paul's Church, Halifax, Nova Scotia

== The crypt and commemorations ==
The crypt contains the remains of 20 congregants which are listed below. Also indicated below are those that have been commemorated in the church through a plaque, a hatchment or a window.

=== Founders of Halifax ===
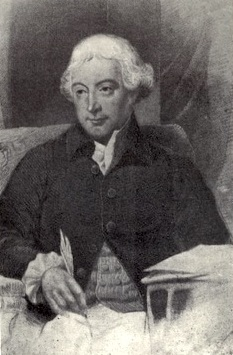
Charles Lawrence. died 1760, Governor of Nova Scotia, 1st person buried in the crypt; participated in the Battle at Chignecto and Siege of Louisbourg (1758)

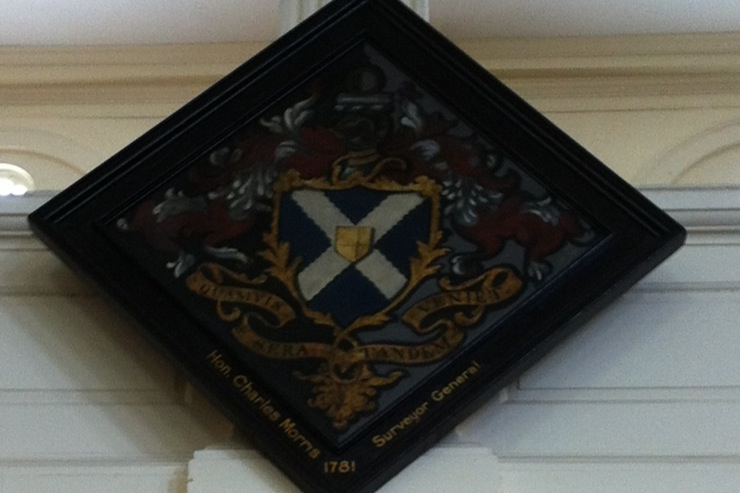
Charles Morris, died 1781 – Battle of Grand Pré; 2nd Chief Justice (1776–1778) (hatchment)

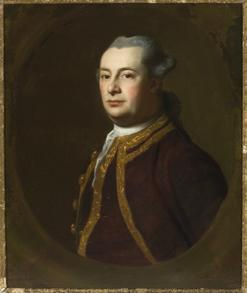
Michael Francklin, died 1782

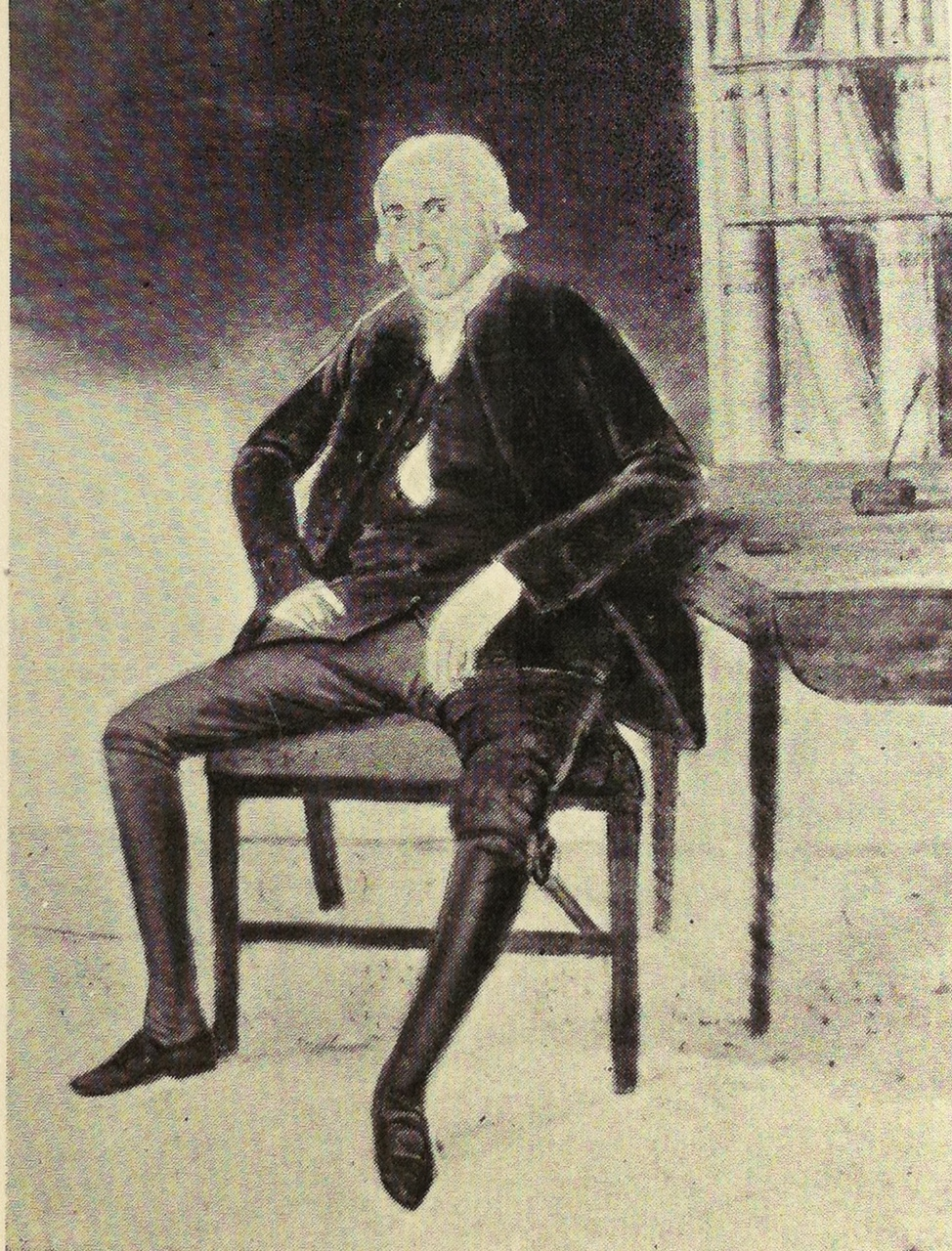
Richard Bulkeley, died 1800

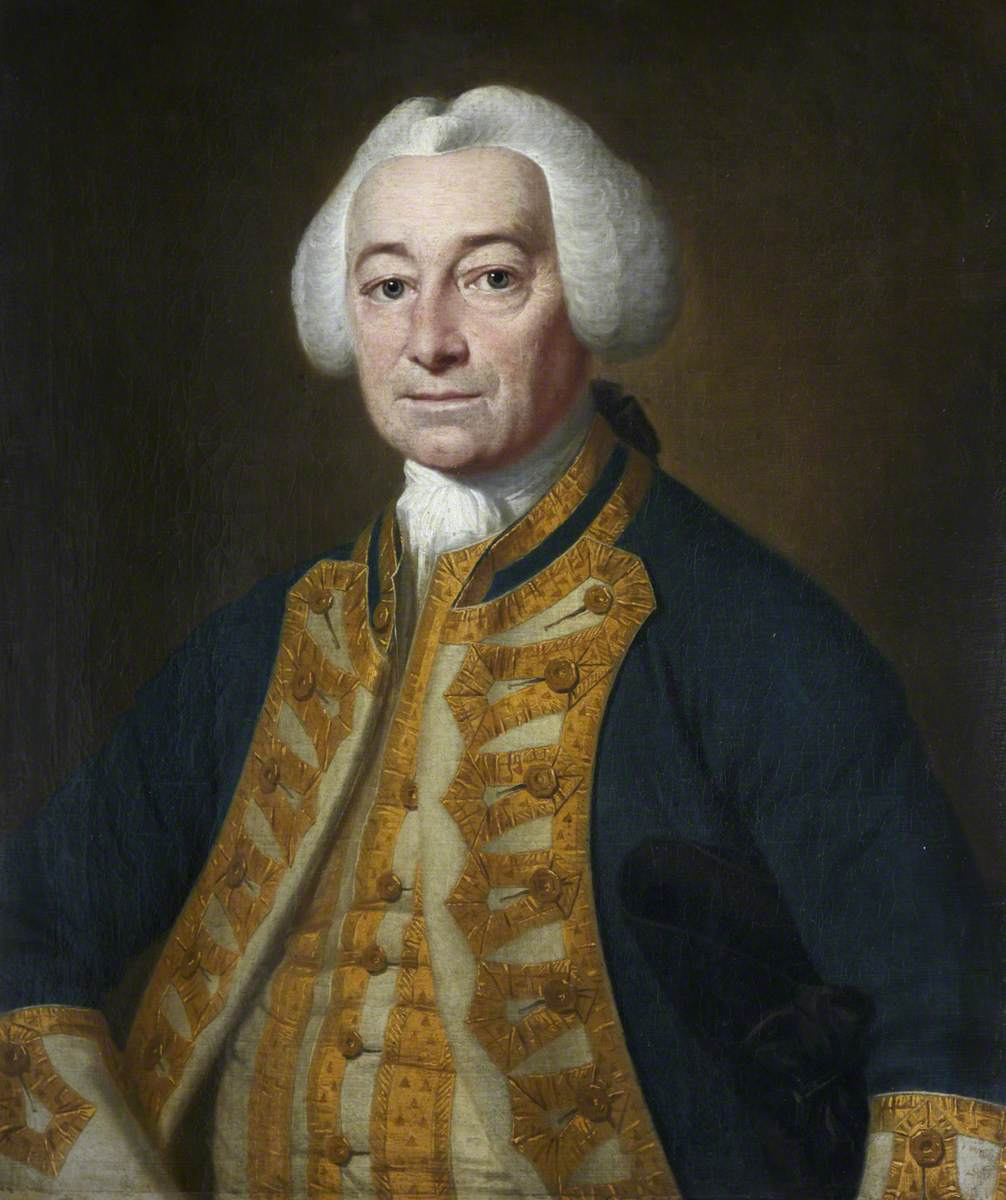
Captain Philip Durell, died 1786 (Sieges of Louisbourg in 1745 and 1758)

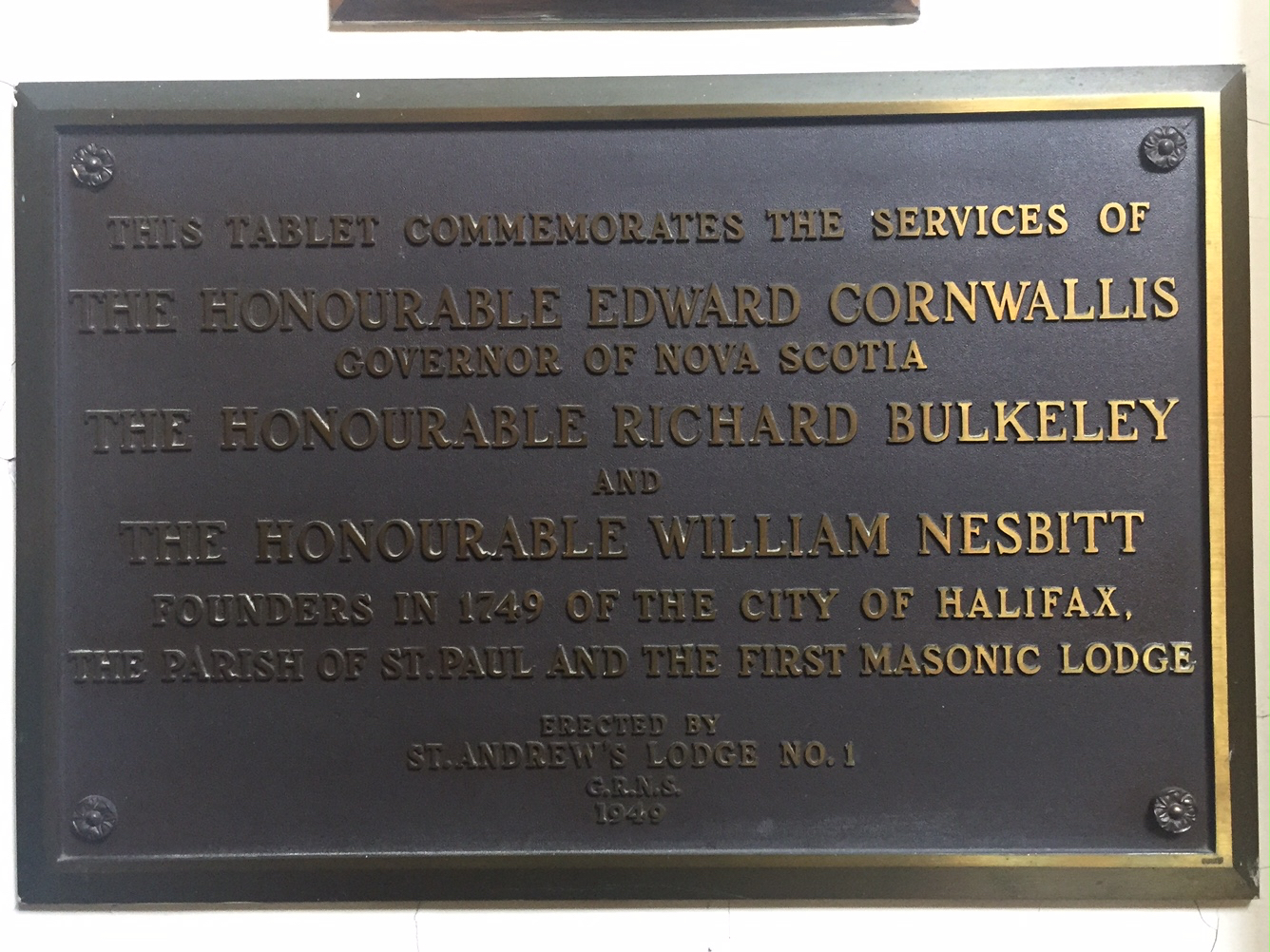
Edward Cornwallis, Richard Bulkeley, William Nesbitt Plaque

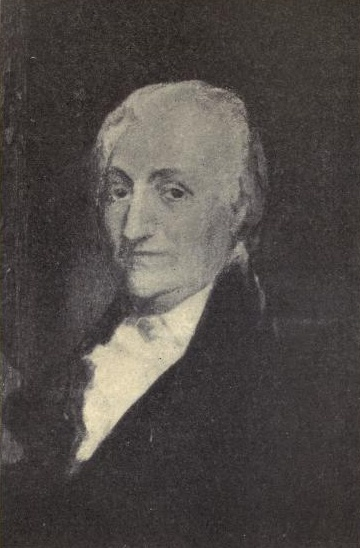
Montague Wilmot

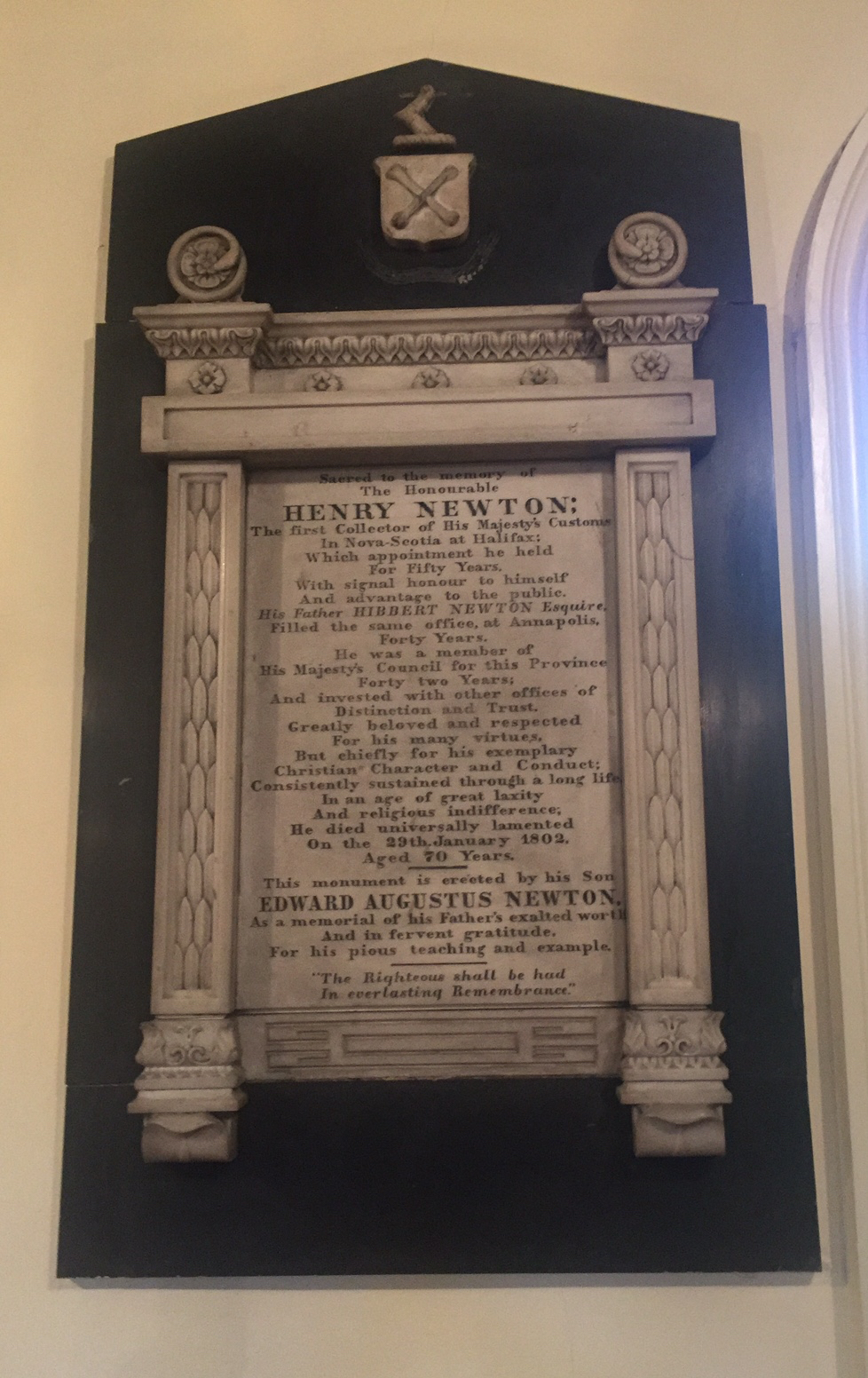
Henry Newton, died 1802

=== American Revolution ===
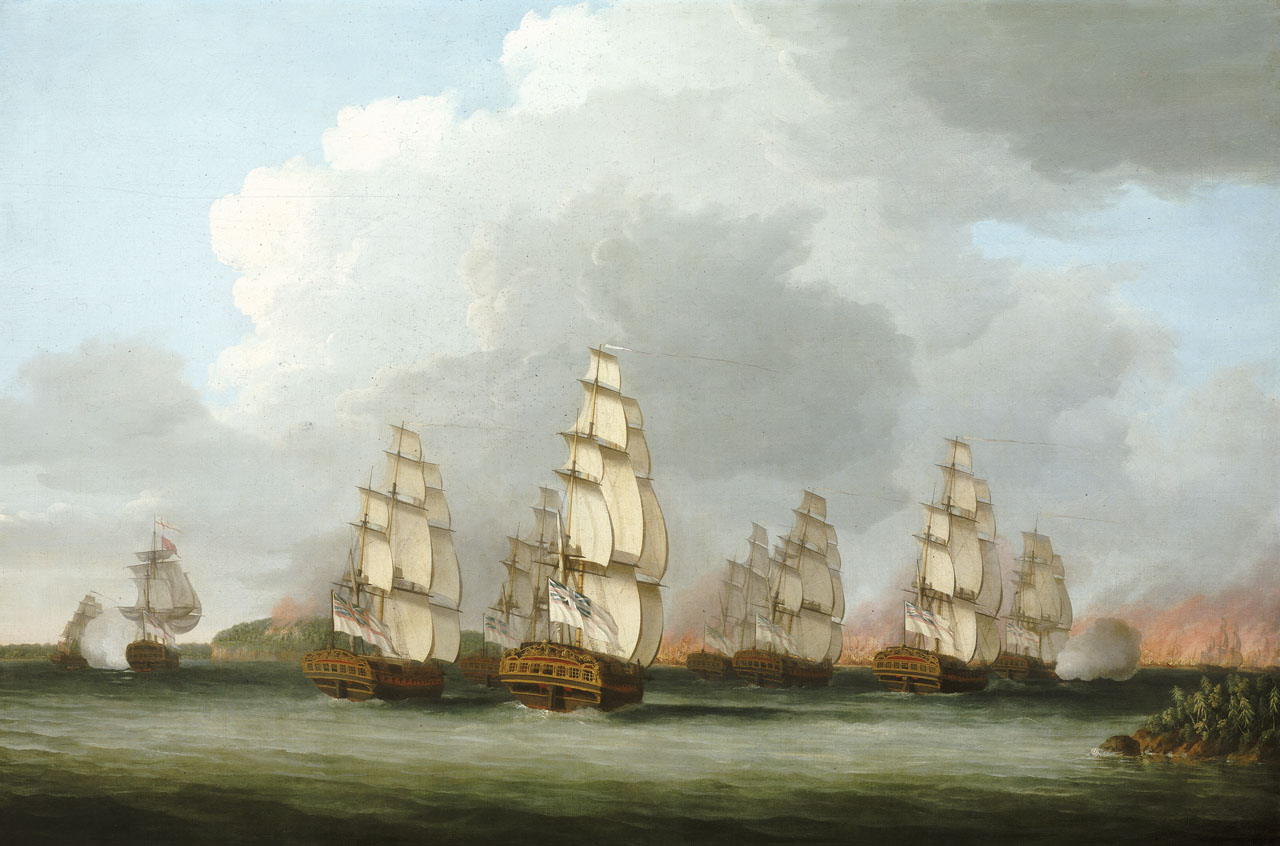
Francis McLean – led land forces to protect New Ireland (Maine) during American Revolution, died 1781 – oldest stone memorial in church

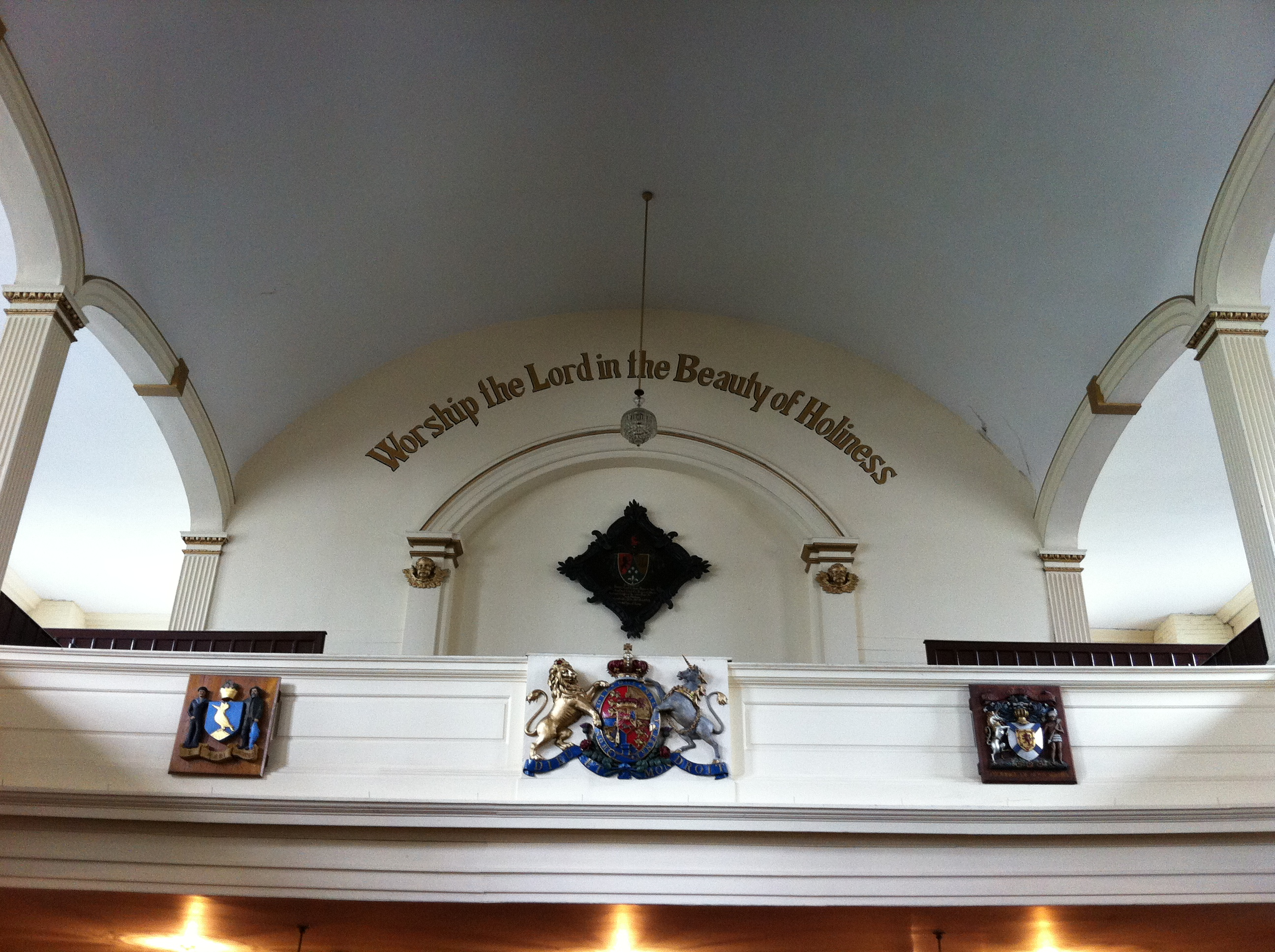
Baron Oberst Franz Carl Erdmann von Seitz Hatchment, died 1782 - Hessian Commander

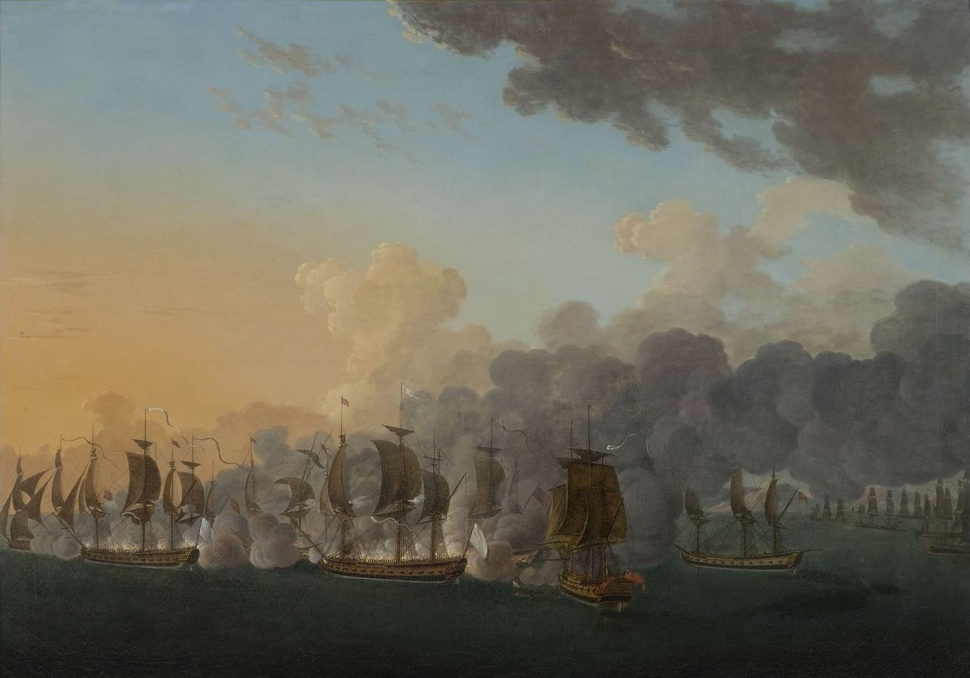
Capt Henry Francis Evans - led the naval forces to protect New Ireland; killed in the Naval Battle off Cape Breton (1781)(plaque)

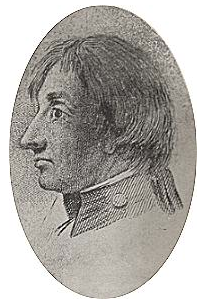
John Parr, died 1791, Governor of Nova Scotia, settled Loyalists in the colony (1782–1891)

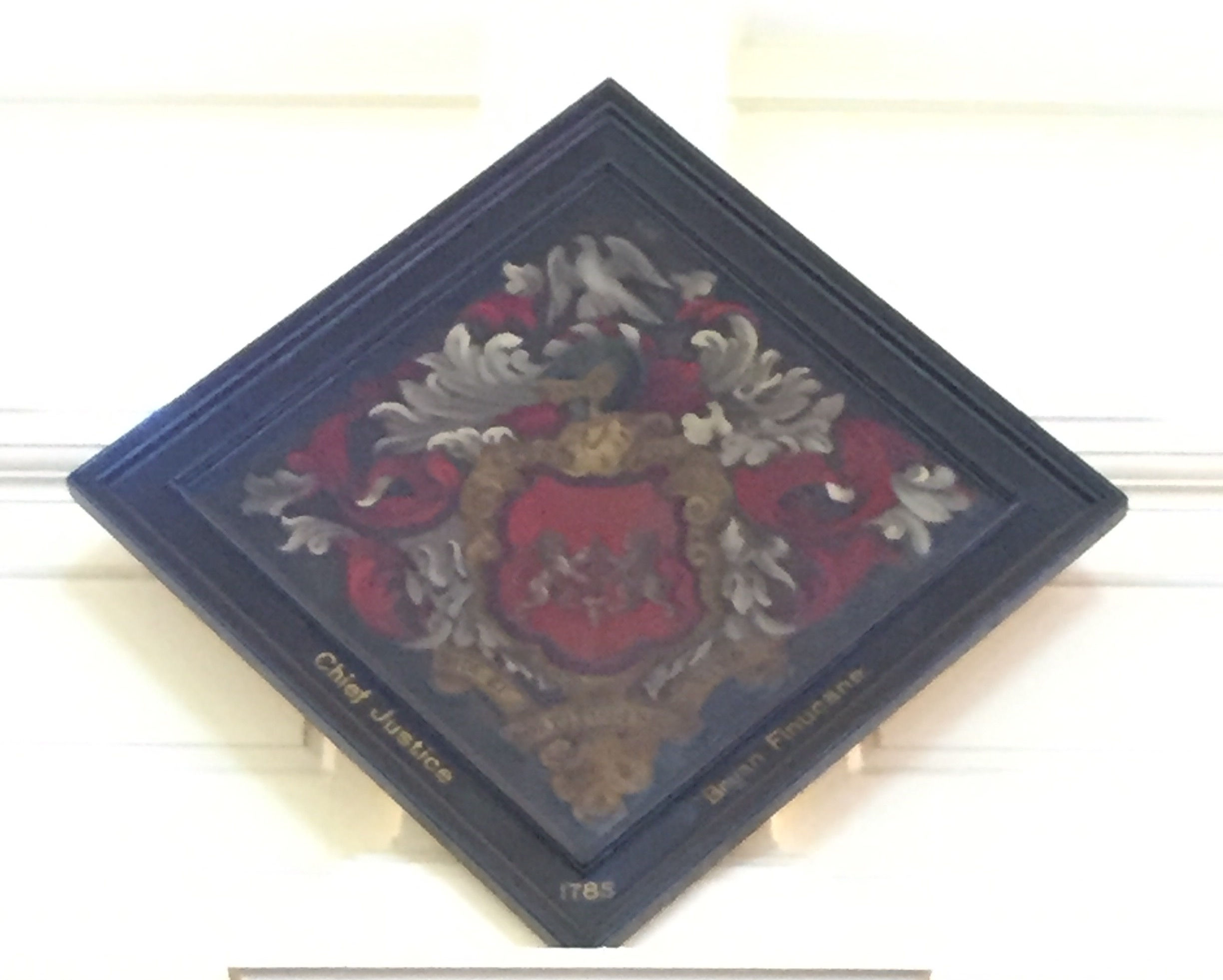
Chief Justice Bryan Finucane, died 1785, 3rd chief justice (1778–1785)

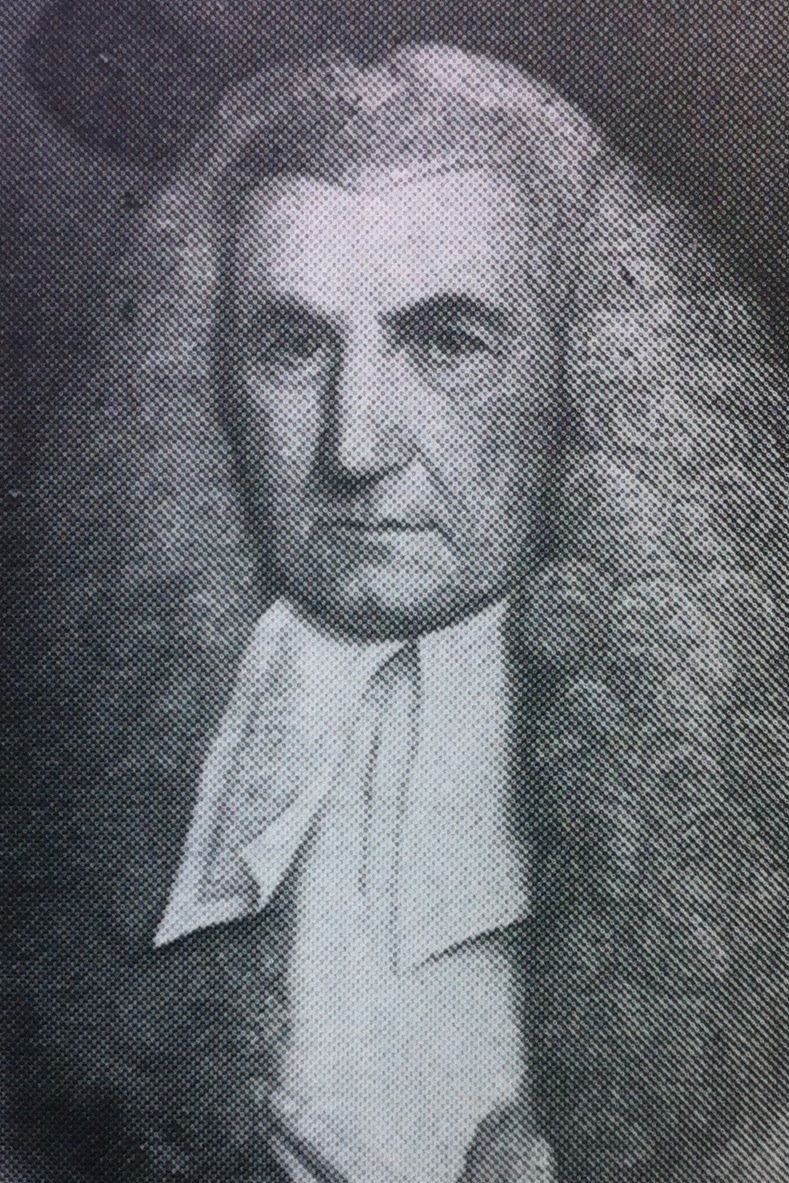
Chief Justice Sampson Salter Blowers, died 1842 – loyalist, instrumental in ending slavery in Nova Scotia (memorial template)
- Lieutenant General William Neville Gardiner, died 1806, (crypt, no plaque) fought alongside Sir William Howe in the Philadelphia campaign (1777) and was wounded in the Battle of Monmouth.

=== French Revolutionary Wars (1792–1802) ===
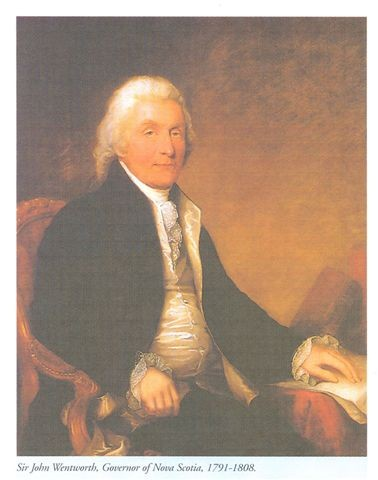
John Wentworth, died 1820, Governor of Nova Scotia (1792–1808)

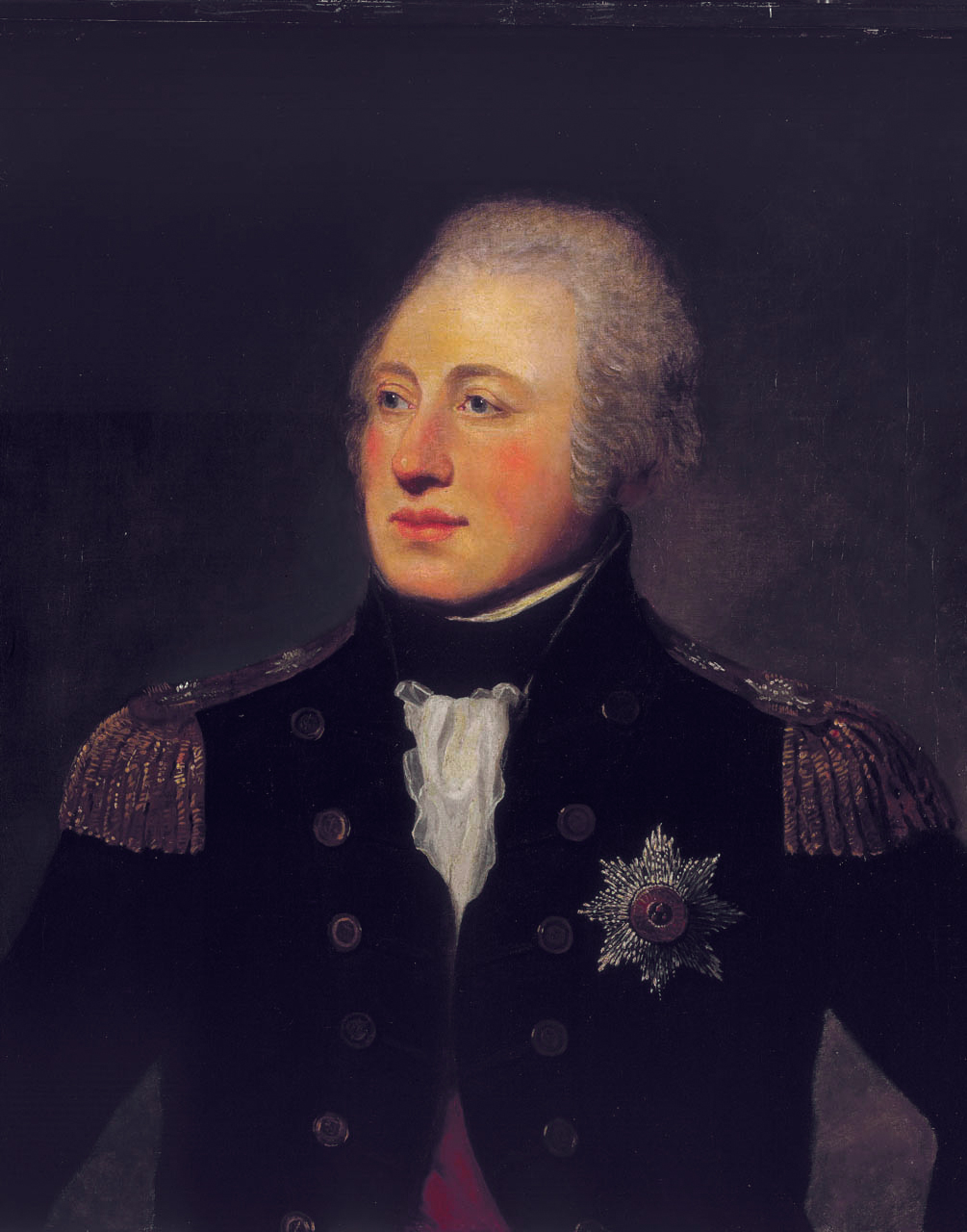
Vice-Admiral Andrew Mitchell, Commander-in-Chief, North American Station (1802–1806) wife, Lady Mary Mitchell, died 1825 – daughter of Richard John Uniacke
- Lieutenant Colonel David Meredith, died 1809

=== Napoleonic Wars (1803–1815) ===
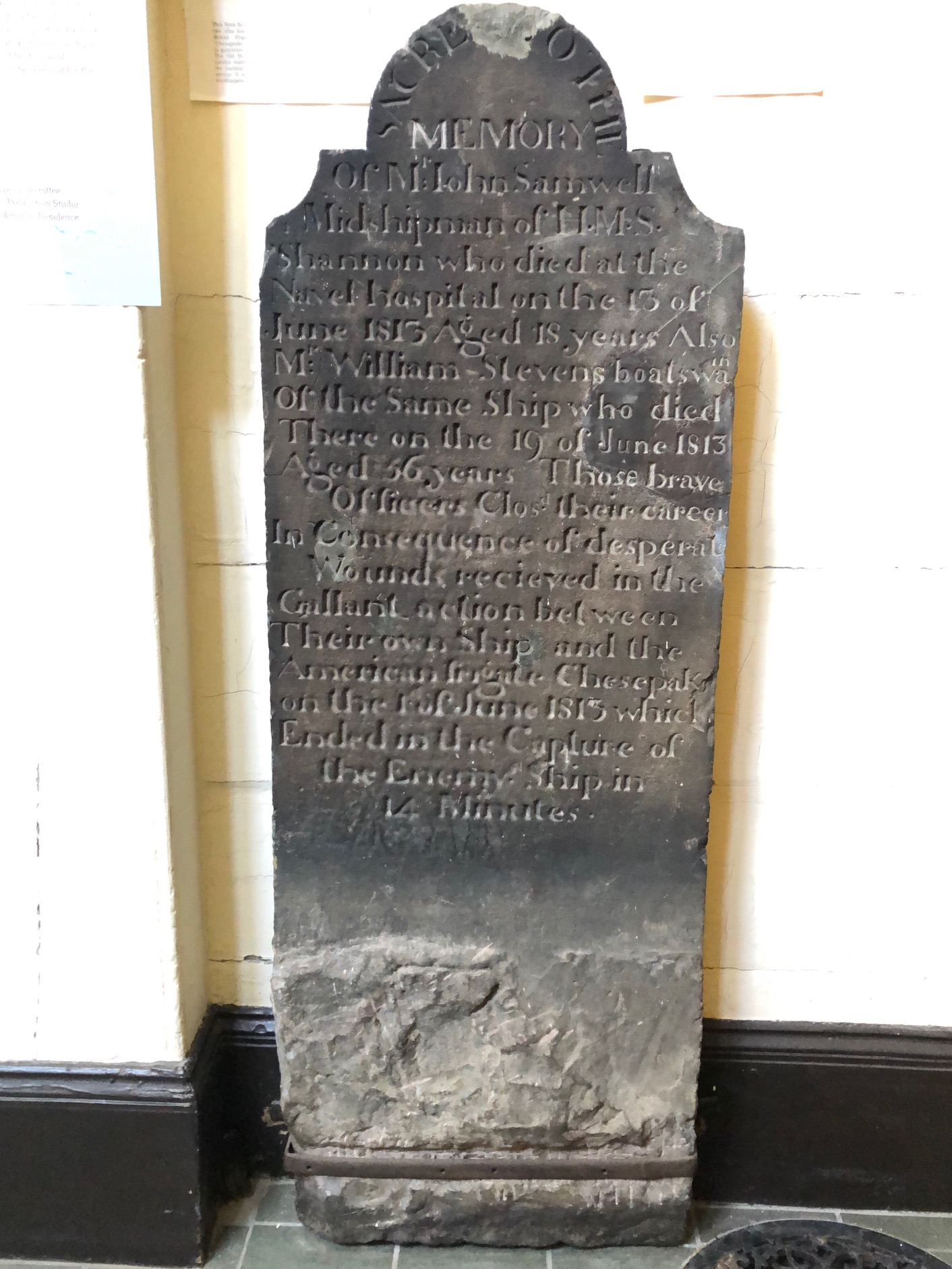
Gravestone for two crew members, HMS Shannon, 1813

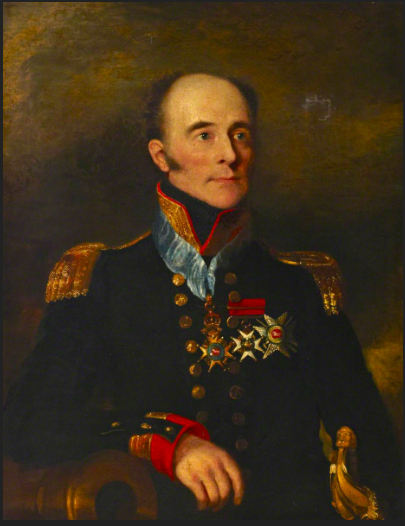
Captain Sir Thomas Ussher's wife Eliza Ussher, died 1835 (plaque)

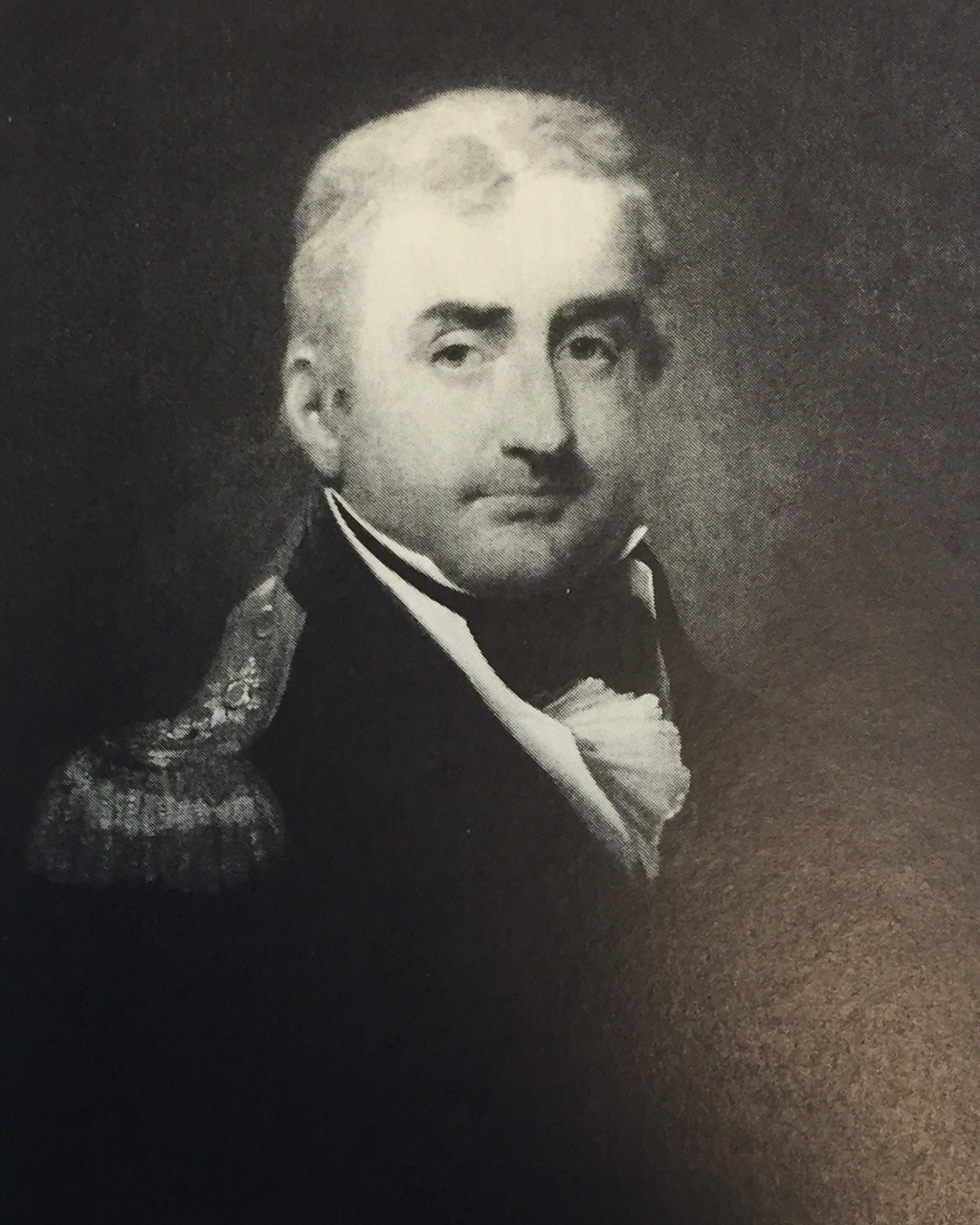
Herbert Sawyer's sister Sophia Sawyer, died 1788 (crypt, plaque) – Daughter of Rear Admiral Herbert Sawyer, Commander-in-Chief, North American Station (1785–1789)

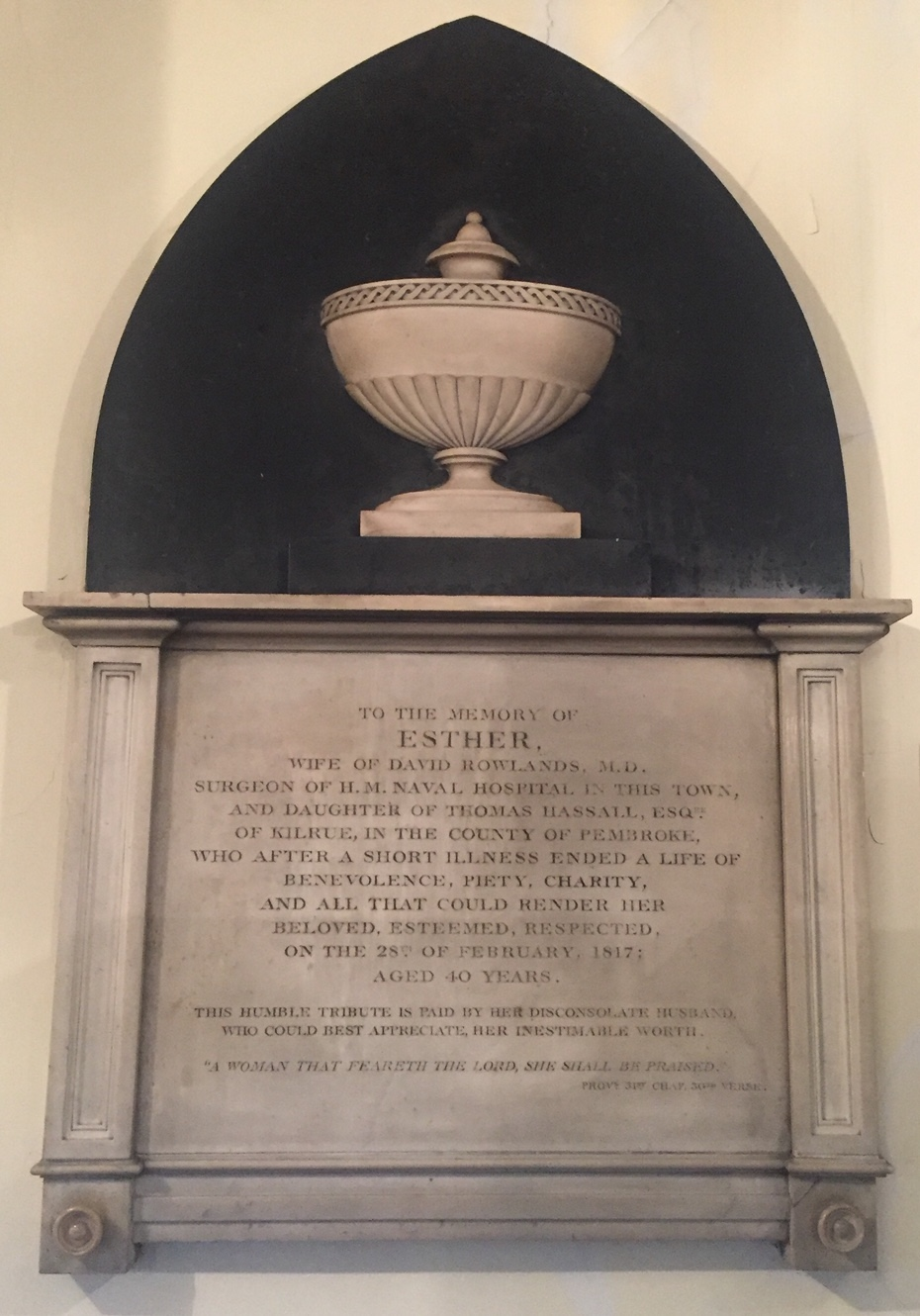
Dr. David Rowlands' wife Esther Rowlands Monument
- Lt. Col. Peter Waterhouse (military officer), c. 1823 81st Regiment of Foot (plaque; tomb in Old Burying Ground)
- Lieutenant-Colonel John James Snodgrass (1796–1841), a British military officer, fought in the Battle of Waterloo (1815) and was an aide-de-camp to Sir Archibald Campbell, 1st Baronet and author. (plaque; tomb in Old Burying Ground)
- John George Deware (Dewar), HMS Rose, died 1830 (plaque; also gravestone in St. Paul's cemetery, and commemorative headstone in Borthwick Churchyard, Borthwick, Midlothian.)

=== Second Boer War ===
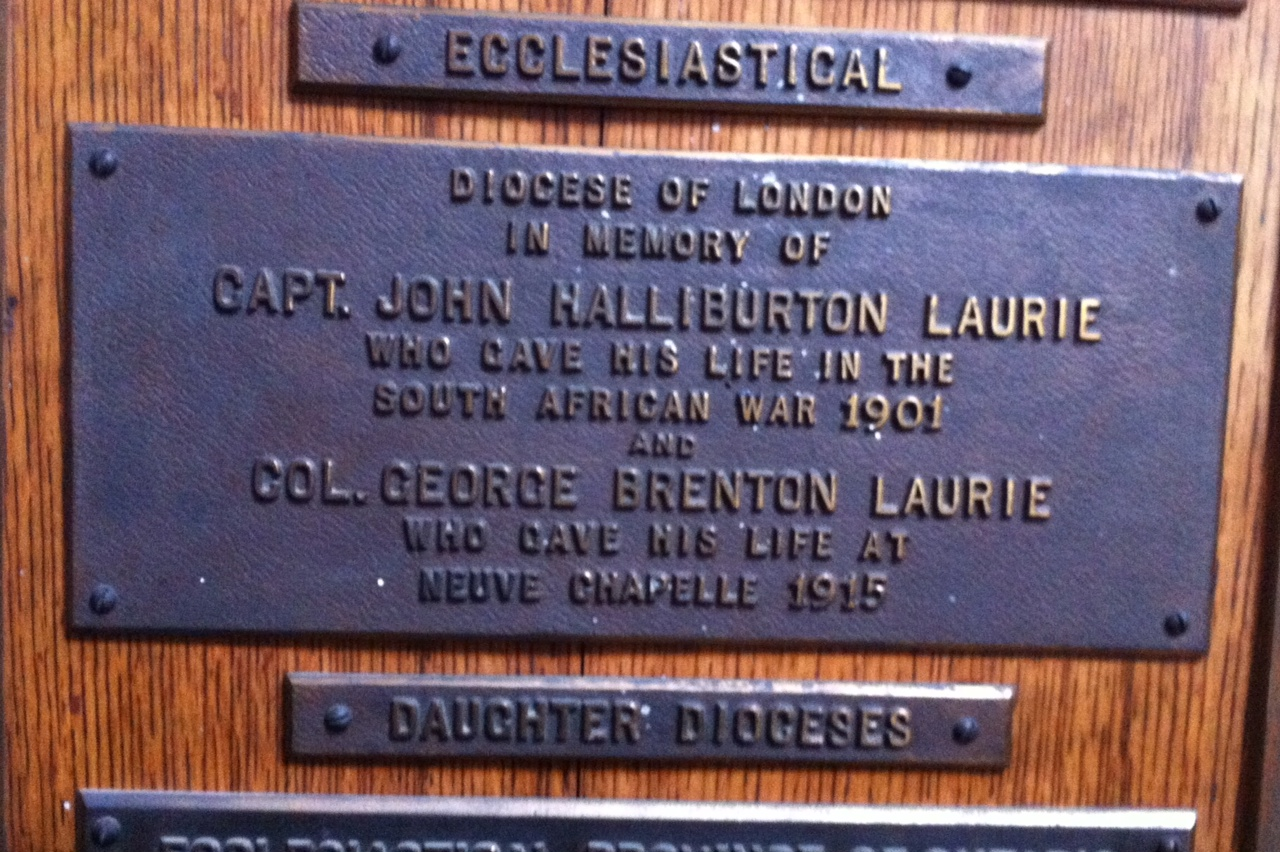
John Wimburn Laurie's sons(plaque)

- Stanley Banfield, d., 2nd Canadian Mounted Rifles (plaque)
- Capt. John Halliburton Laurie, died 1901, son of John Wimburn Laurie (plaque)

=== WW1 ===
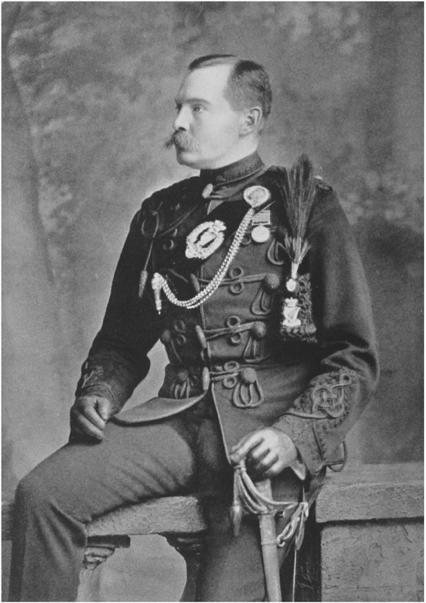
George Brenton Laurie, died 1915, son of John Wimburn Laurie, (plaque)

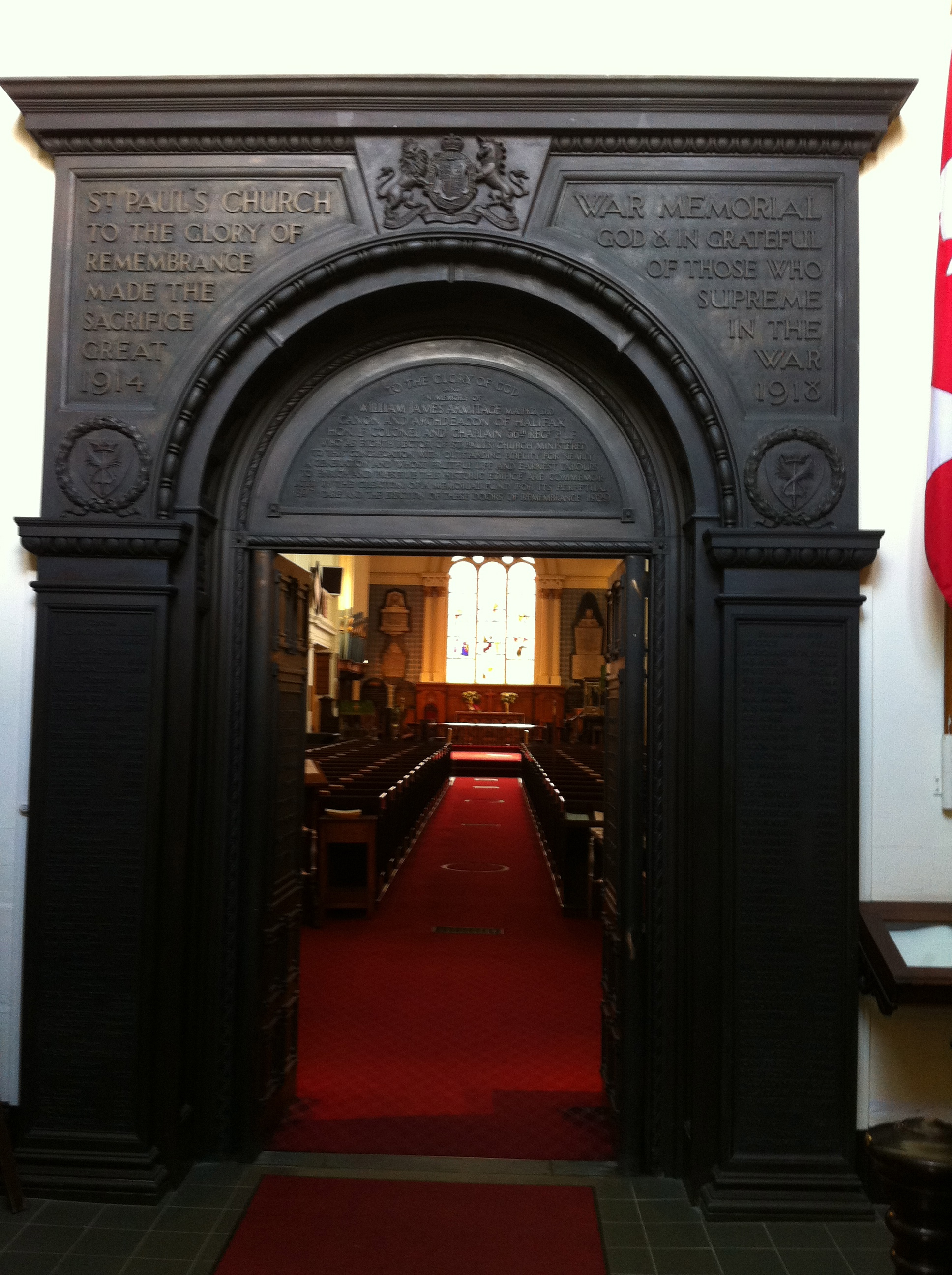
WW1 Doorway Arch - engraved with names of Nova Scotians who died (also commemorating William James Armitage who gathered the names of the war dead)

=== Other ===
- Lt. Gov. of Nova Scotia Peregrine Maitland's infant son George Bertie Maitland, (crypt) died 1831
- Rear admiral Leonard W. Murray, died 1971 – ashes in the Naval Columbarium (Naval Vault)
- Alfred Gilpin Jones
- Charles Francis Norton, died 1835, 52nd Light Infantry (monument)
- Capt. Douglas, HMS Sylph, died 1813
- Sarah Mudge, died 1818 (crypt)
- Captain John Oakes Hardy (Okes)'s, of HMS Assistance, wife Susan (Woodcock) Hardy, daughter of Dr. Edward Woodcock rector at Watford (member of Society for Promoting Christian Knowledge); married at Edmonton, Middlesex, England, m. 1794, died 1799; Hardy commanding HMS St. Albans was part of the capture of l'Elizabeth French frigate, under Vice-Admiral George Murray, Aug, 28, 1796; Hardy commanding HMS Courageux for reduction of St. Lucia, 22 June 1803.
- Joseph Frederick Wallet DesBarres – Governor of Prince Edward Island and Cape Breton is buried at St. George's Church
- Window for Jane Tremaine, Sunday school Teacher for 65 years; only memorial Window destroyed in the explosion

== Prominent families ==
=== Uniacke Family ===
The family of Richard John Uniacke is featured on many plaques and monuments in St. Paul's Church. On separate occasions, two Uniacke family members stood trial for murder.

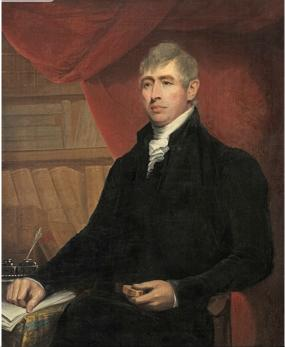
Richard John Uniacke

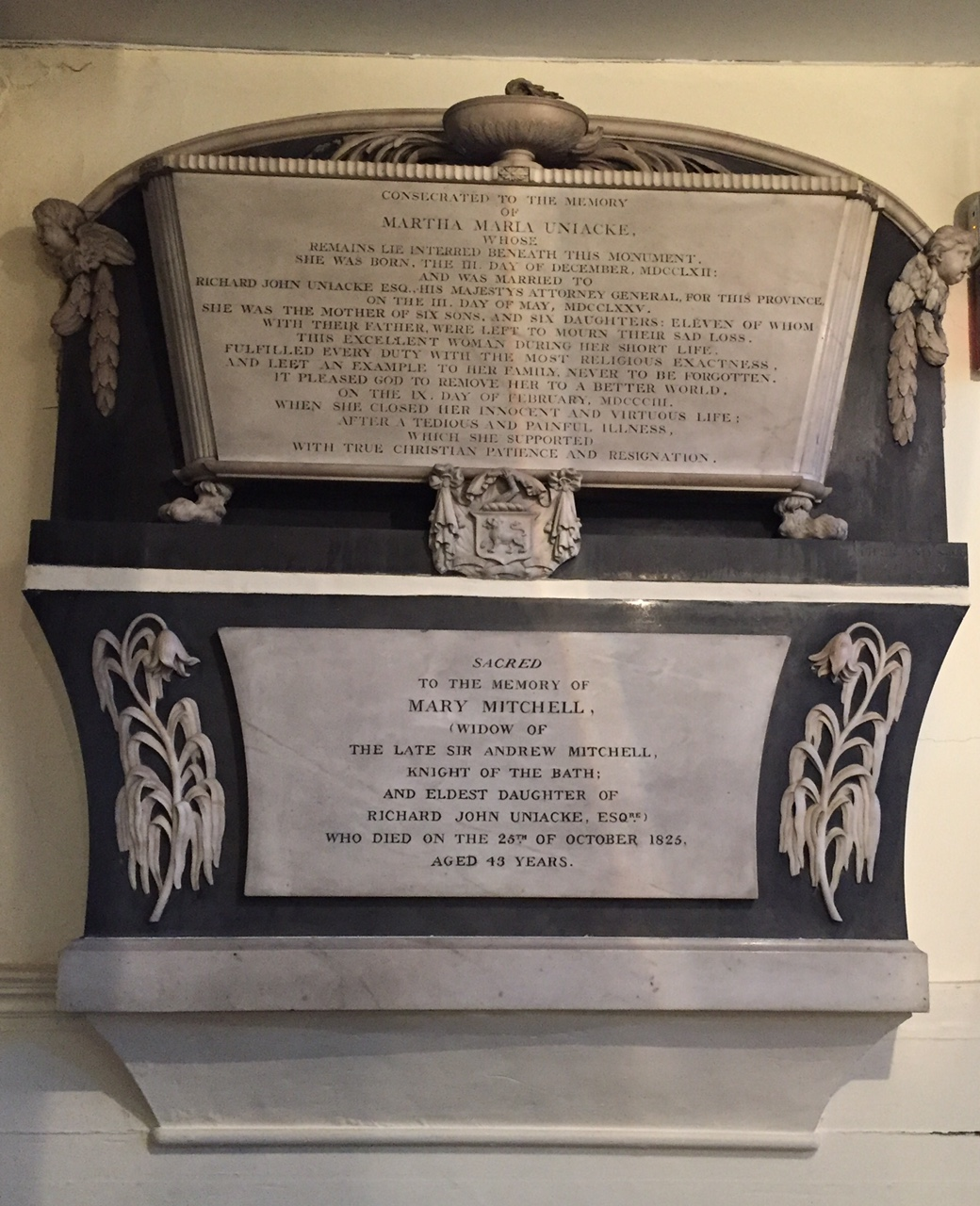
Martha Uniacke

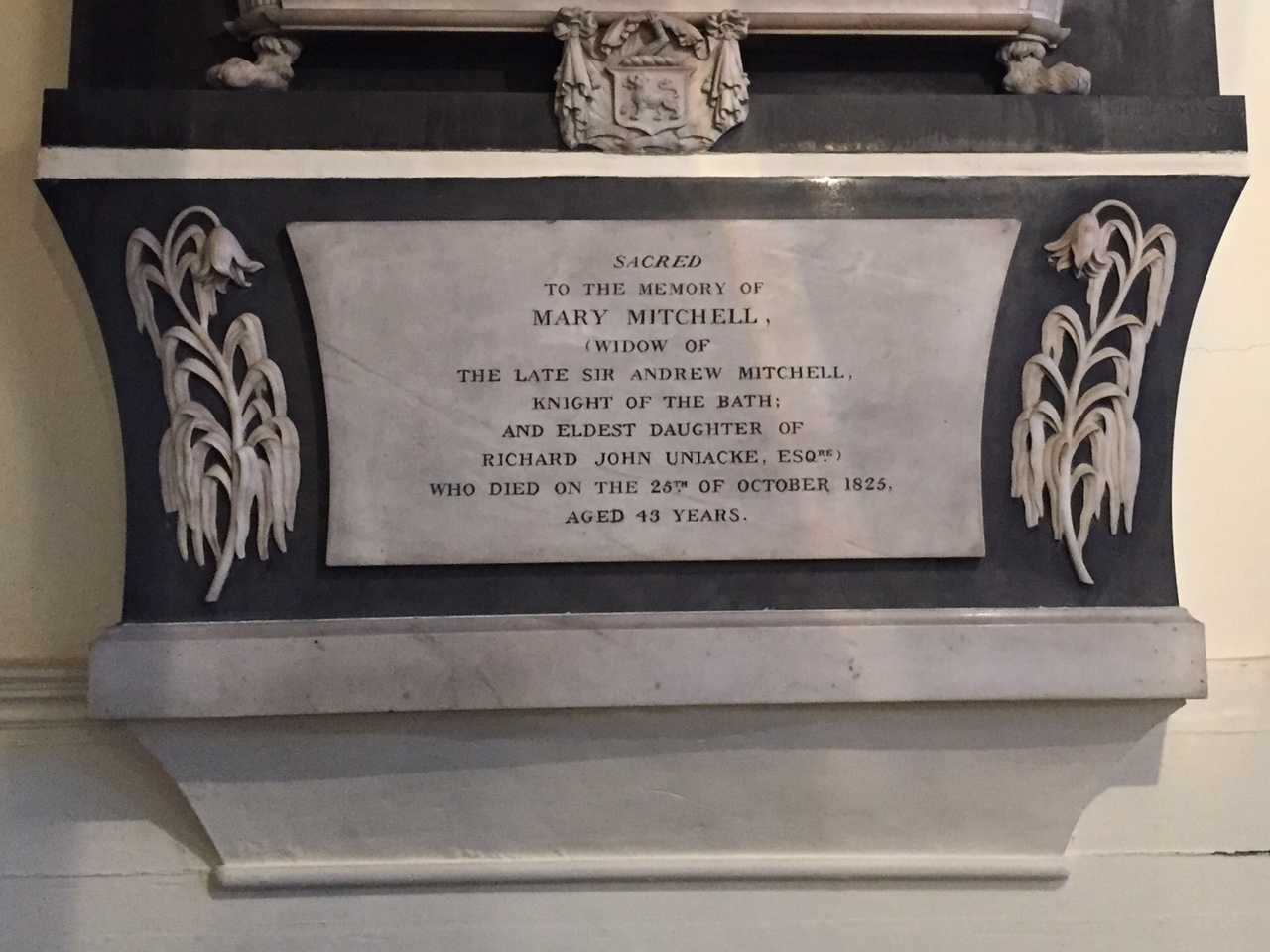
Mary (Uniacke) Mitchell (wife of Andrew Mitchell)

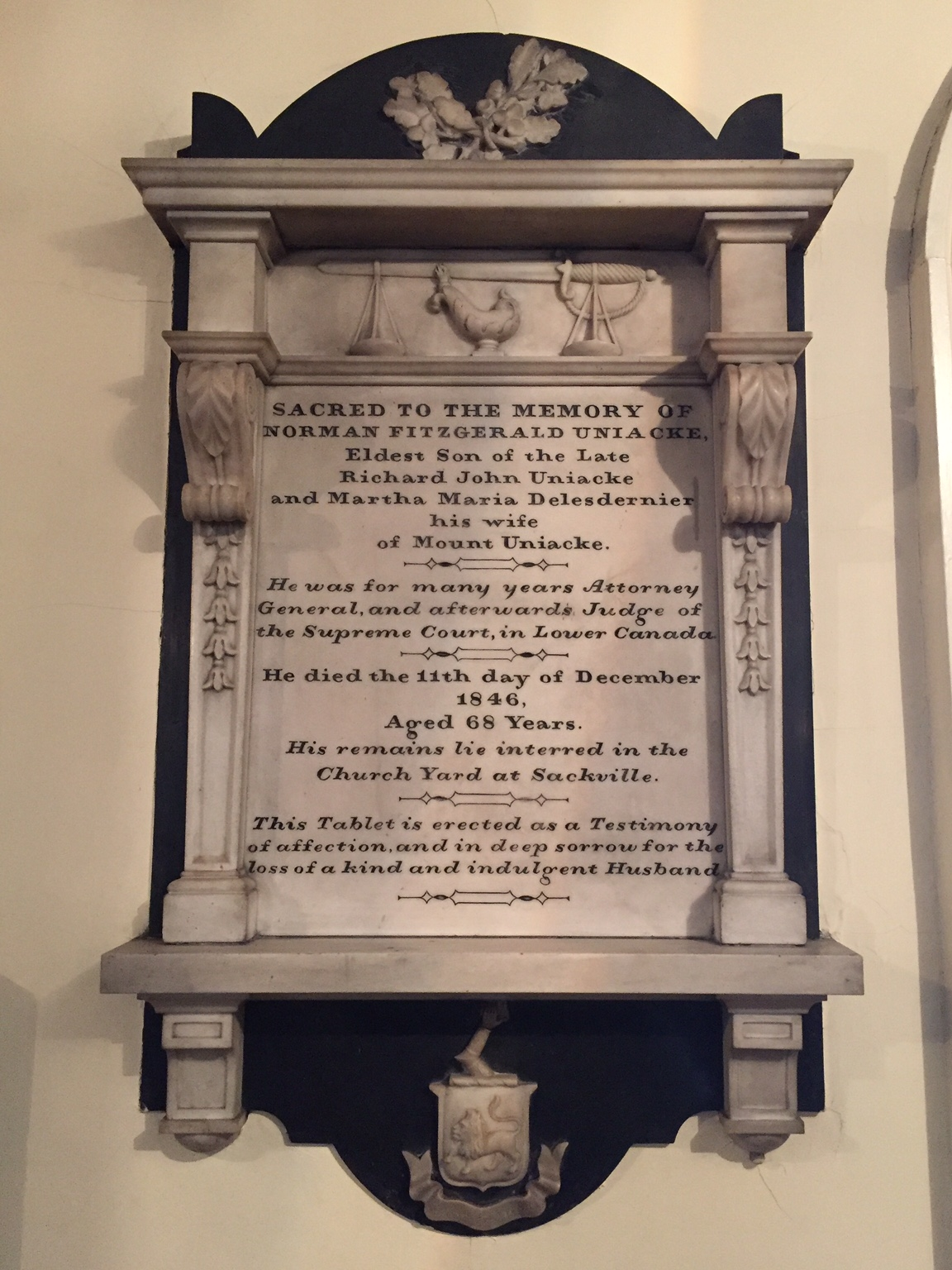
Norman Fitzgerald Uniacke

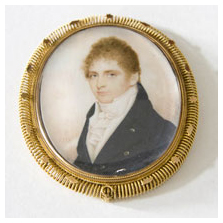
Richard John Uniacke, Jr.

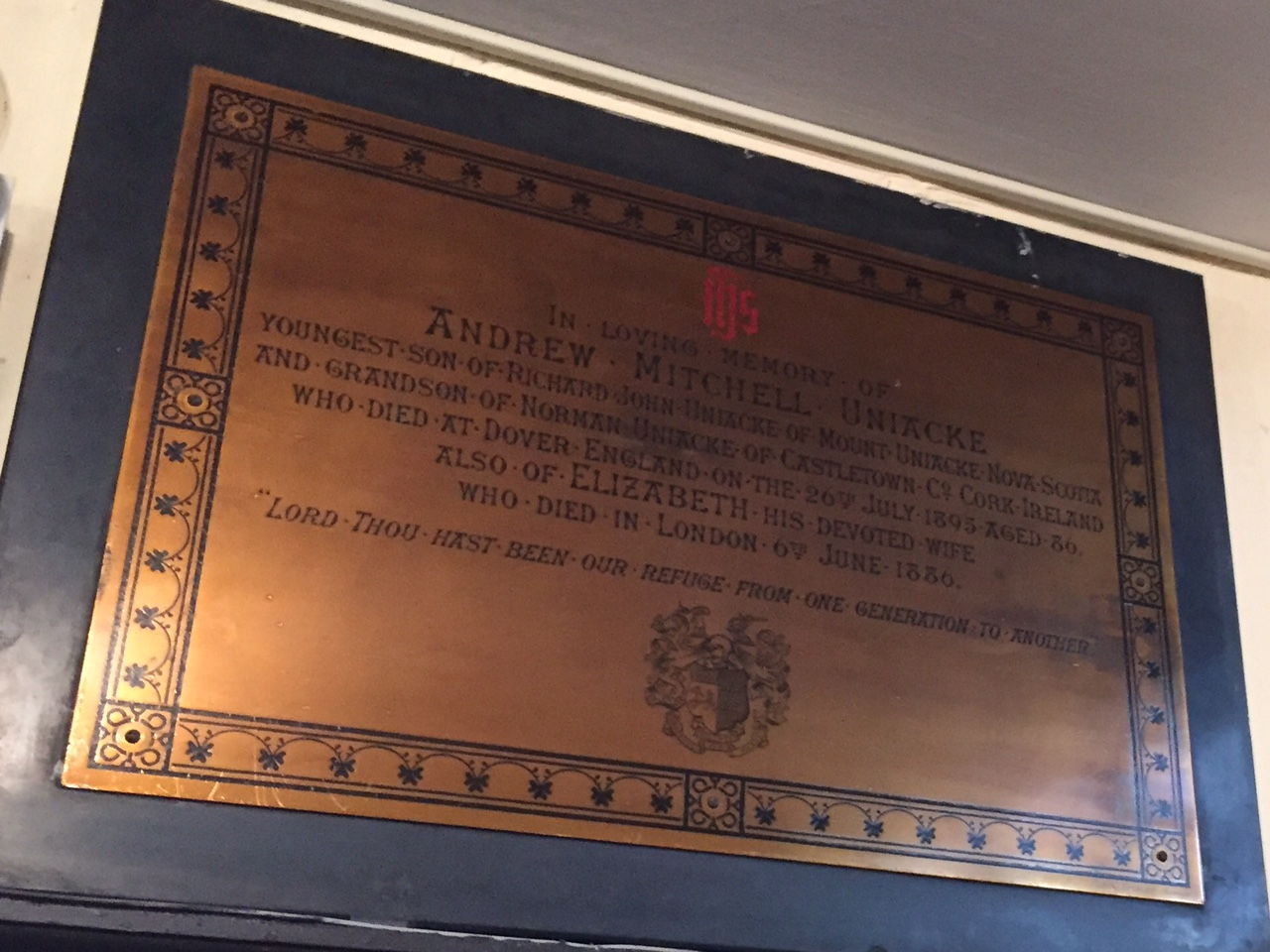
Andrew Mitchell Uniacke

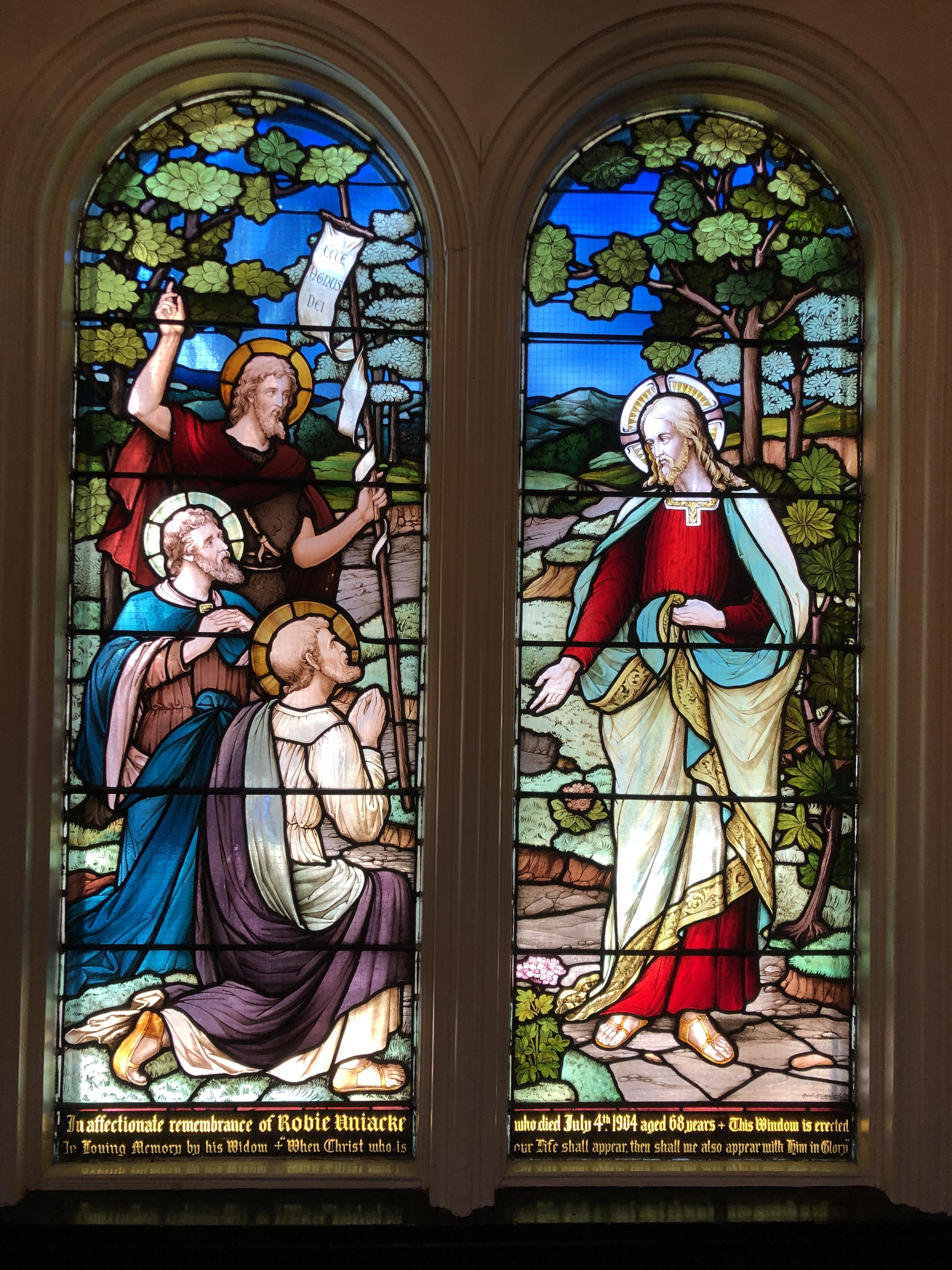
Robie Uniacke window, died 1904

=== Almon Family ===
There are numerous memorials to the family of Dr. William James Almon in the church. There were four generations of doctors in the family that had a significant impact on the field of medicine in the province.

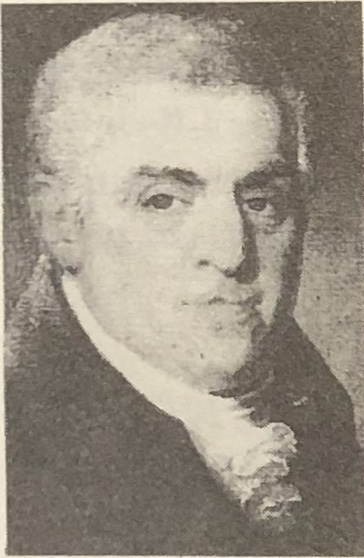
William James Almon, died 1817

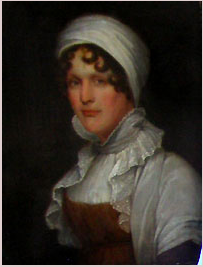
Rebecca Byles Almon, died 1852, (plaque) wife of William James Almon; oldest child of Mather Byles

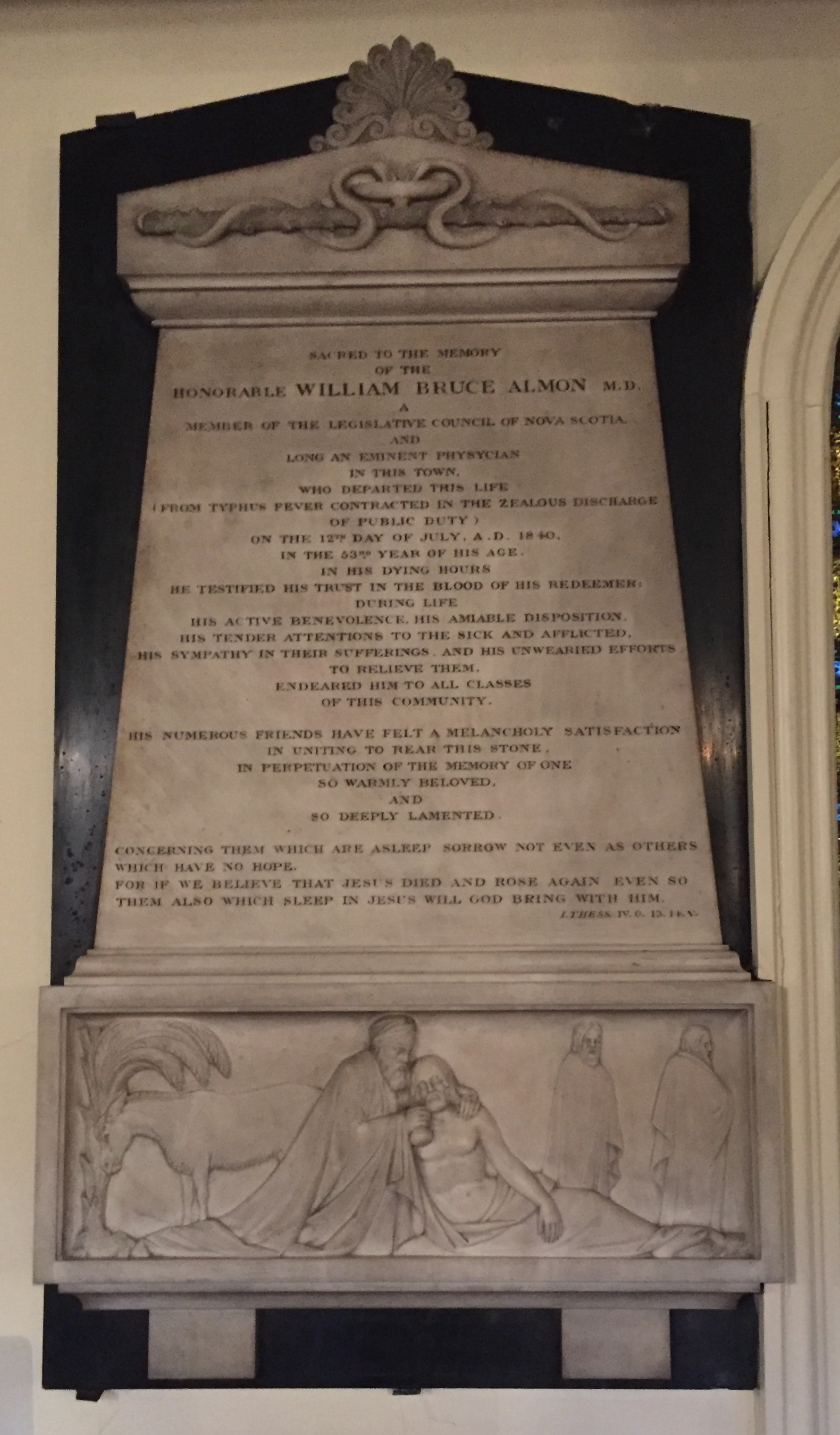
William Bruce Almon, died 1840

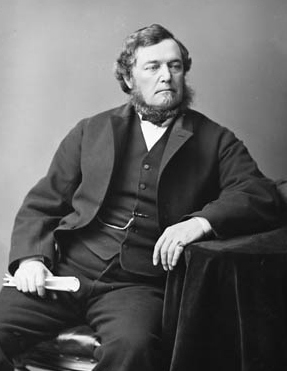
William Johnston Almon, died 1901
- Amelia Rebecca (Almon) Ritchie – daughter of William Bruce Almon – memorial plaque
- John Egan Almon, died 1917 (plaque)
- William Bruce Almon (1875–1940) (plaque)

=== Cogswell Family ===
The church features memorials for the family of Henry Hezekiah Cogswell. There are monuments placed to four of his children, three of which died while Henry was alive. His son Rev. William became a celebrated orator and author.

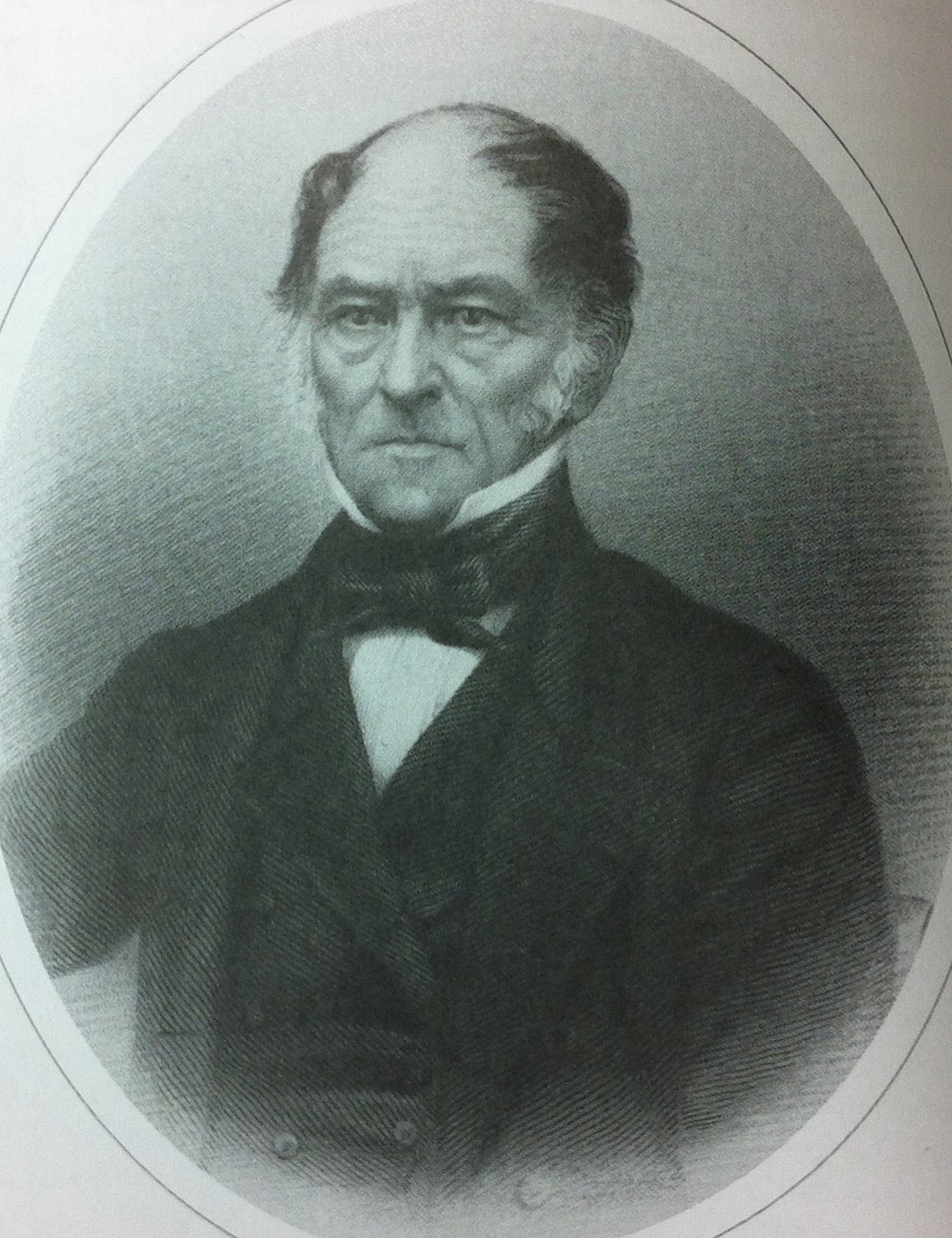
Henry Hezekiah Cogswell

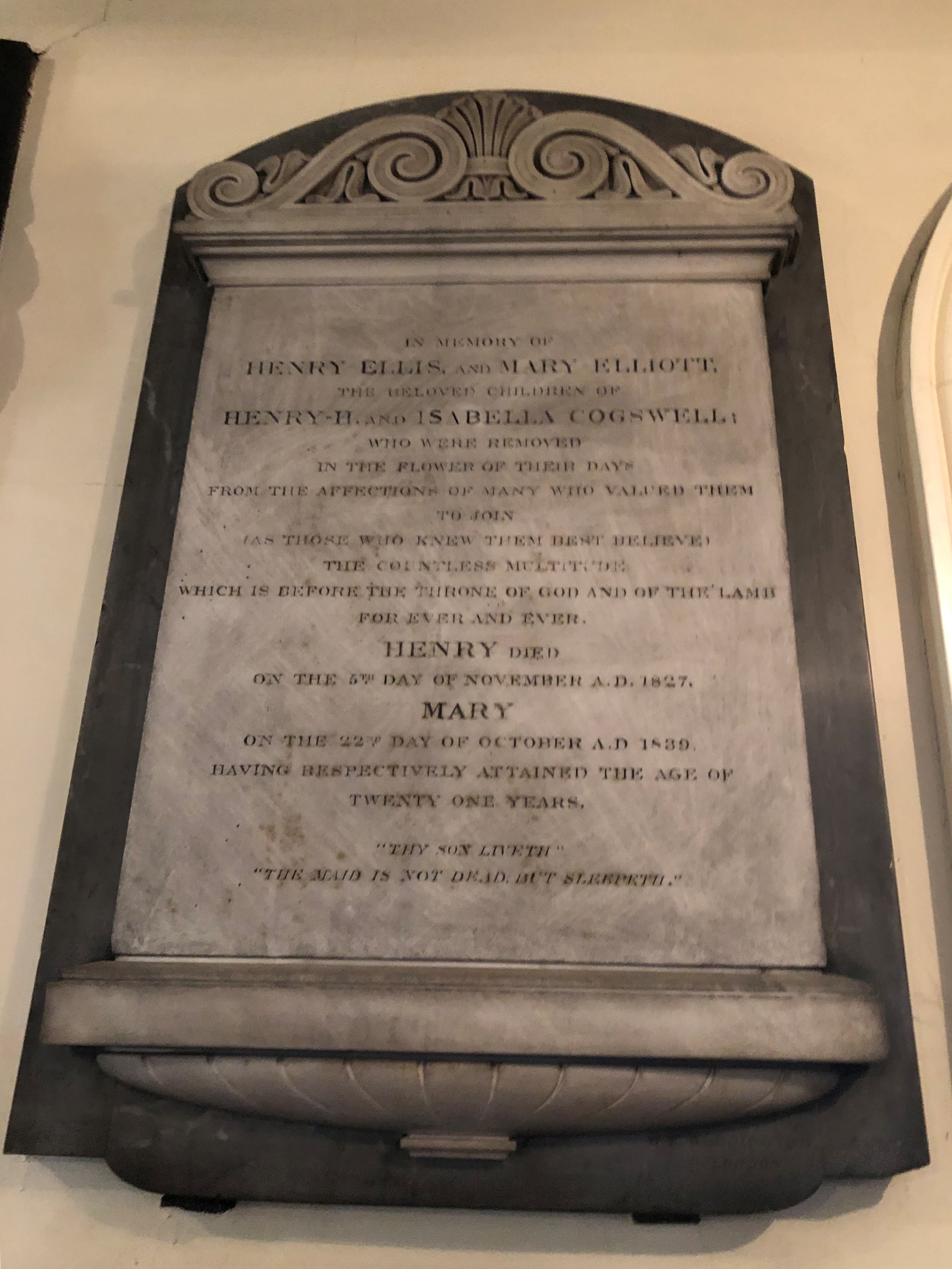
Henry H. Cogswell children's monument by William F. Woodington

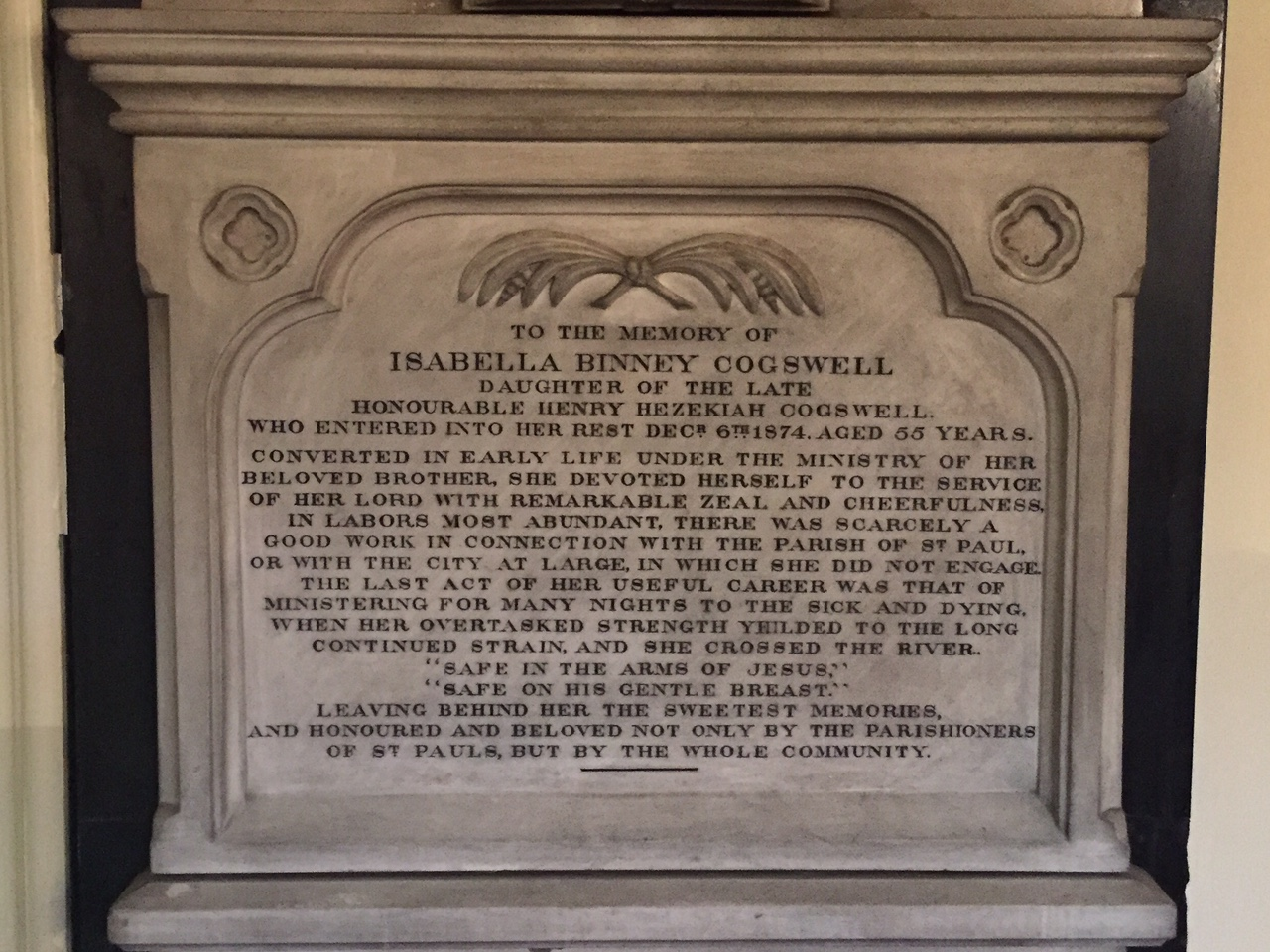
Cogswell monument to his daughter Isabella Binney Cogswell

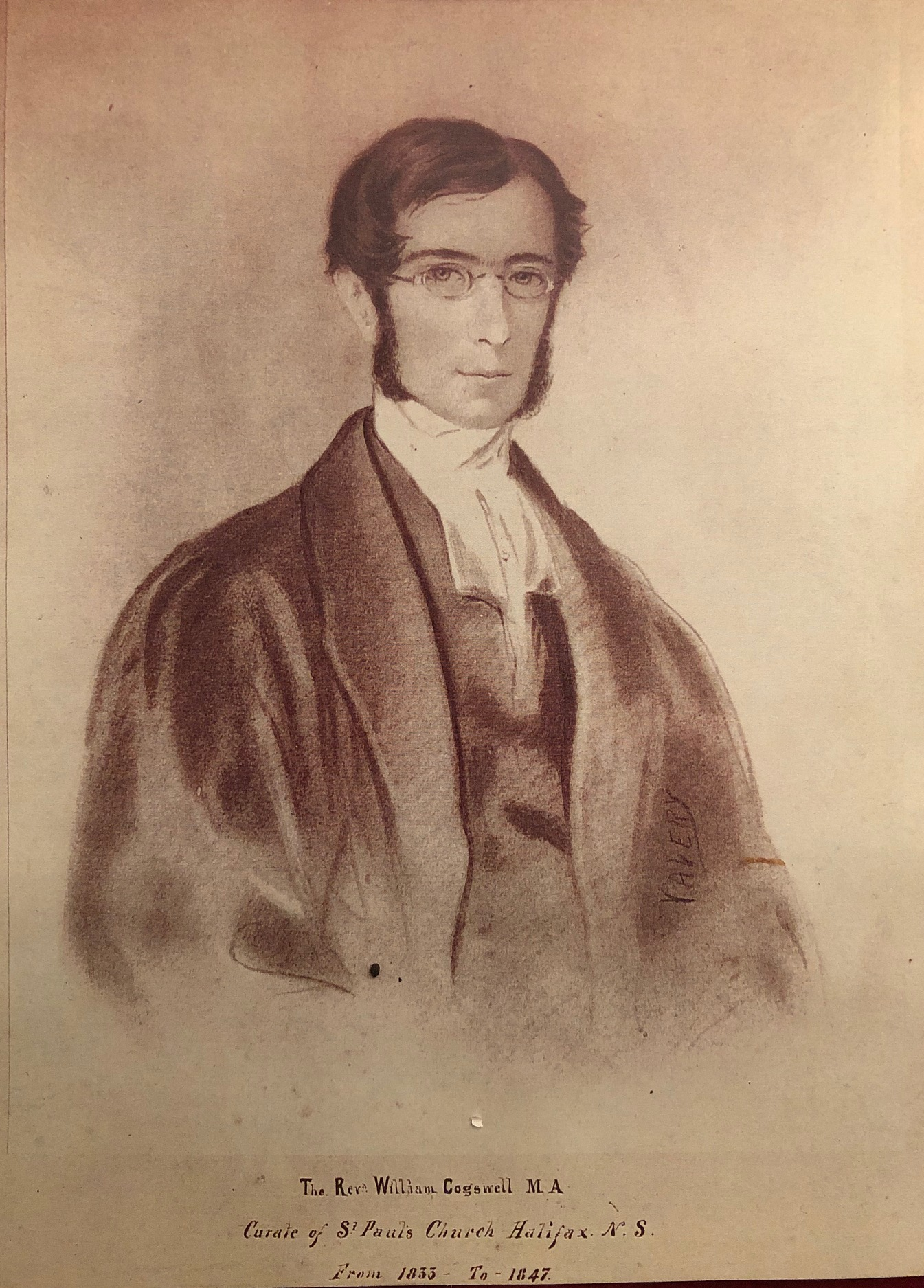
Rev. William Cogswell

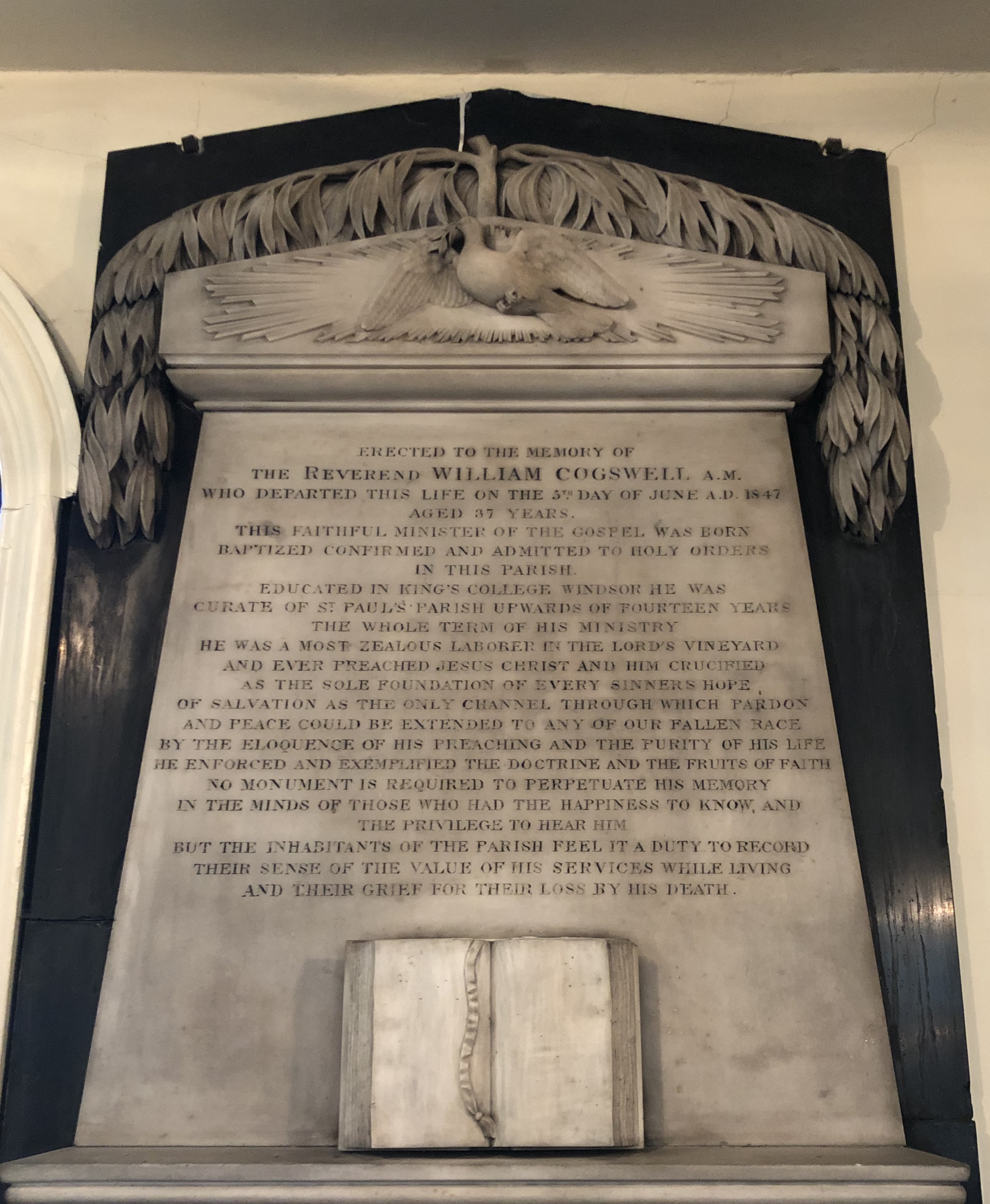
Rev. William Cogswell Monument

=== Ritchie Family ===
The church features memorials for the family of Hon. John William Ritchie. There are memorial windows placed for a son and five of his daughters. His twelve children donated money for the memorial window on the south side of the church.

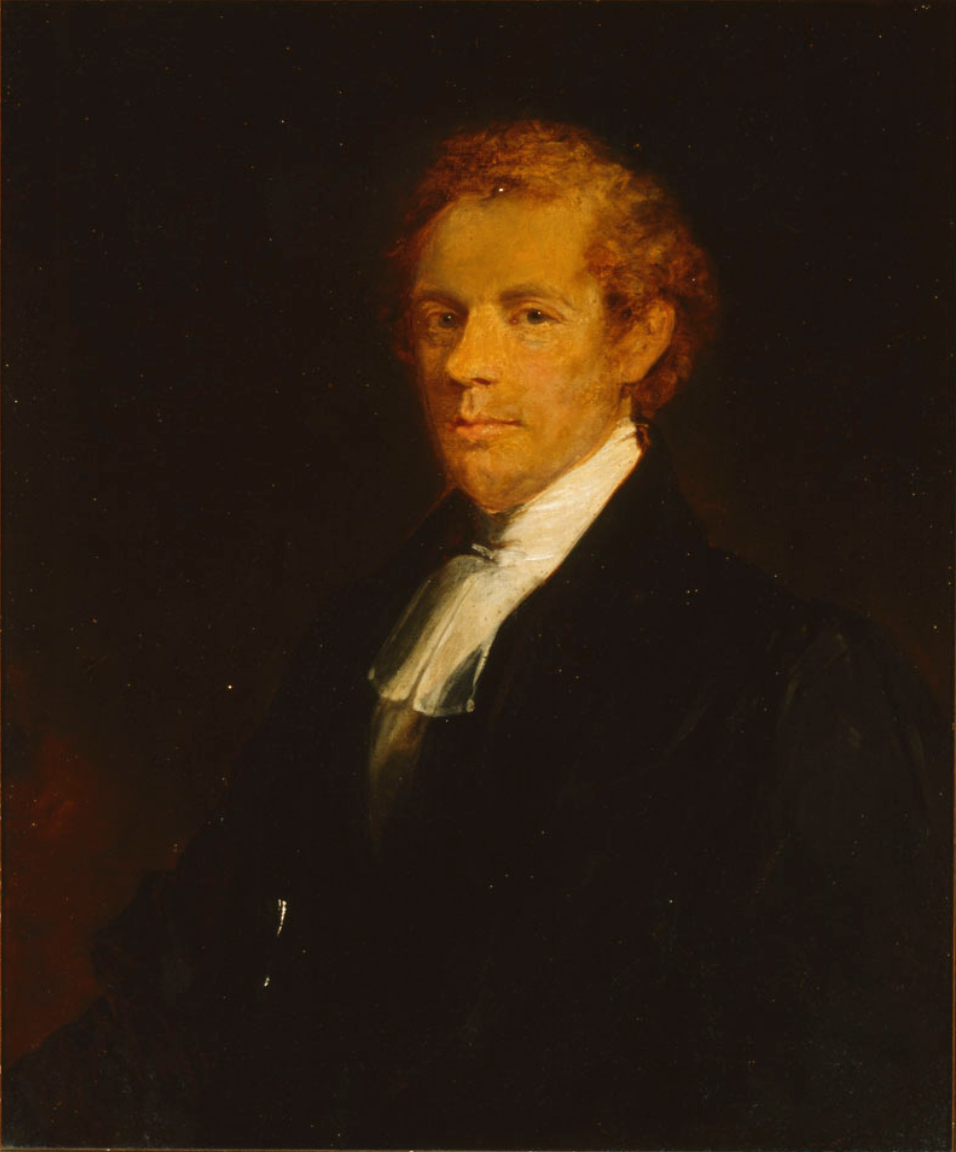
Hon. John William Ritchie, died 1890 – Father of Confederation

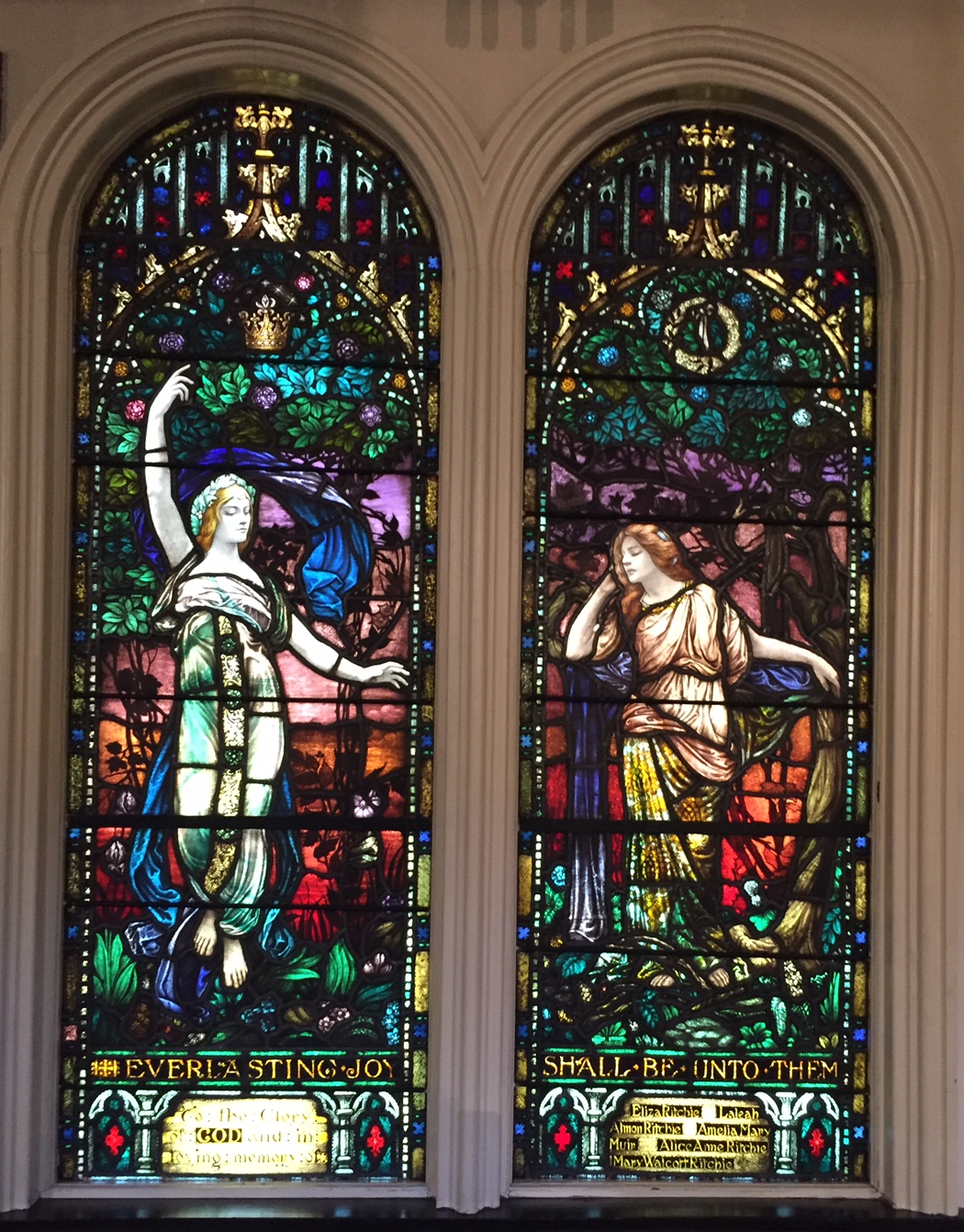
Suffragist Eliza Ritchie (d.1933) and Sisters window

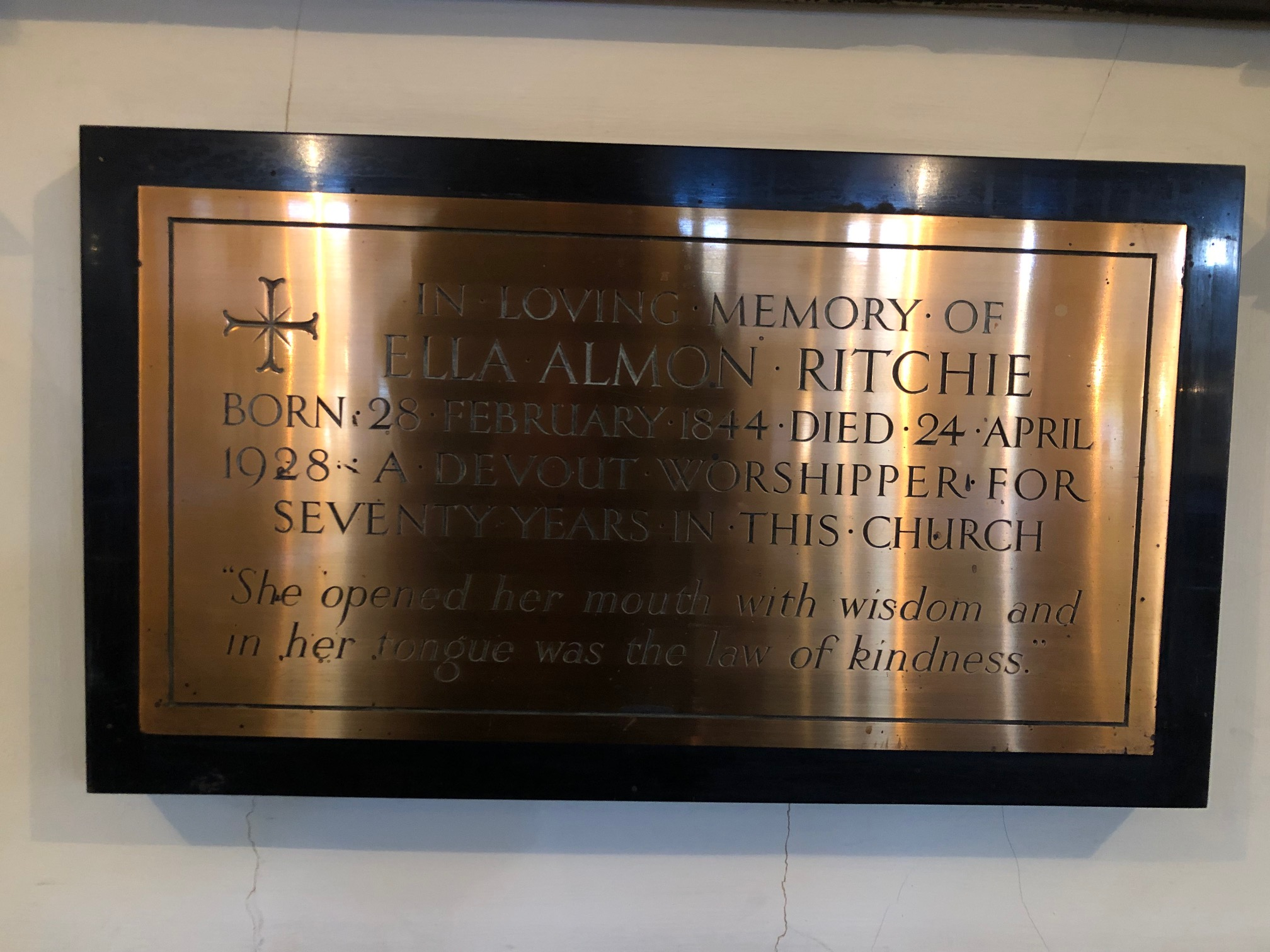
Ella Almon Ritchie

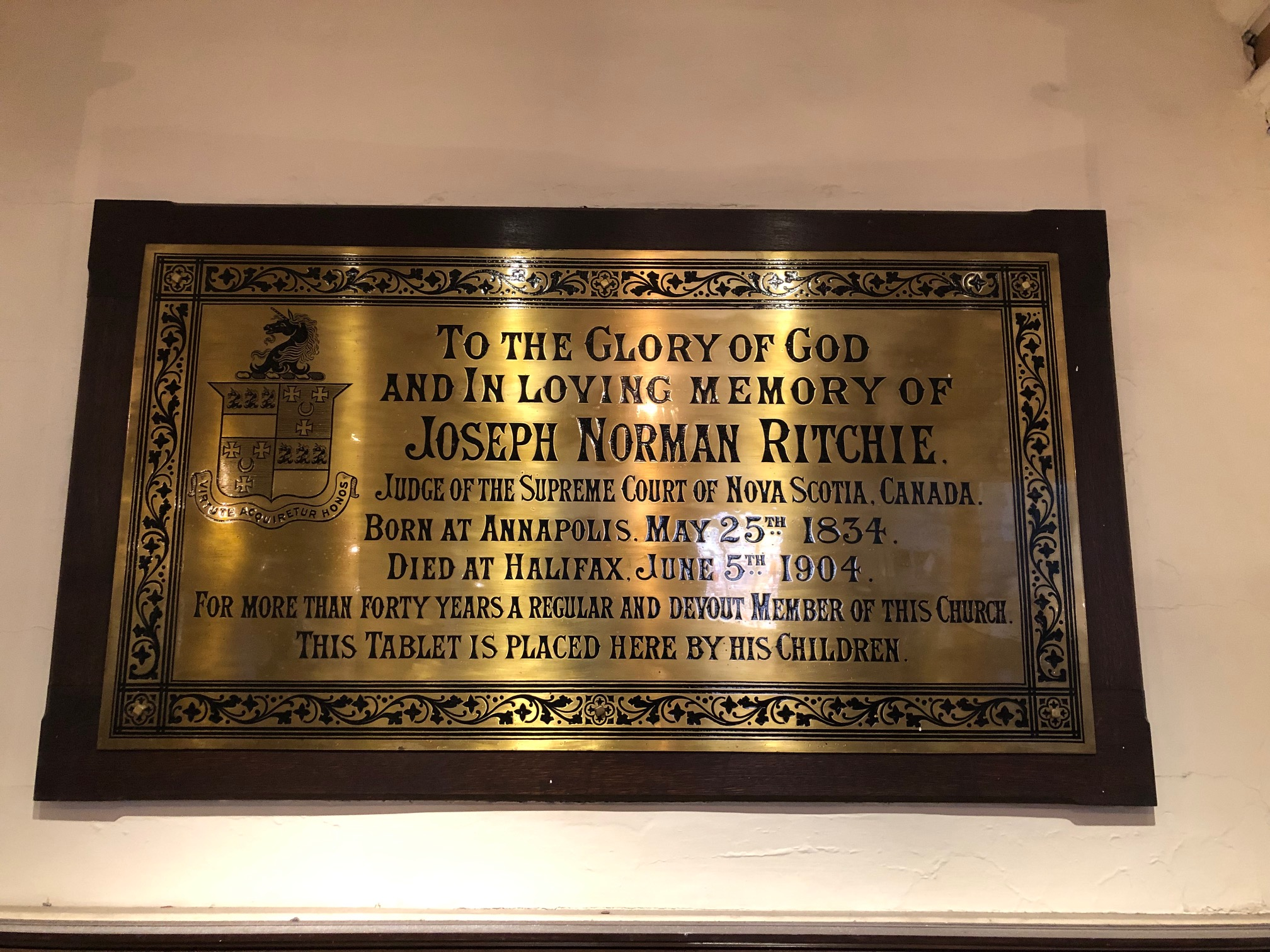
Joseph Norman Ritchie

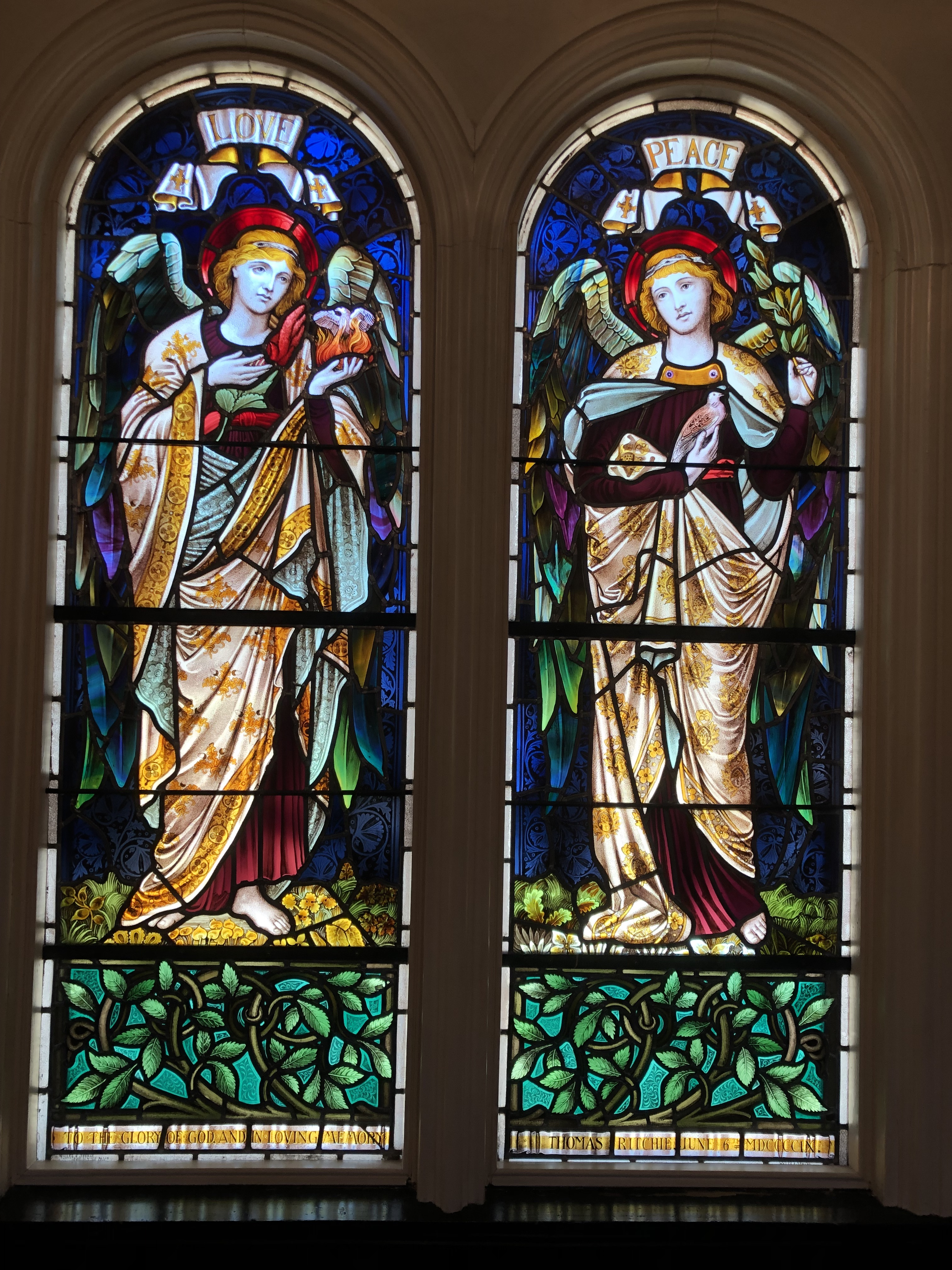
Thomas Ritchie

== Notable events ==
=== Marriages ===
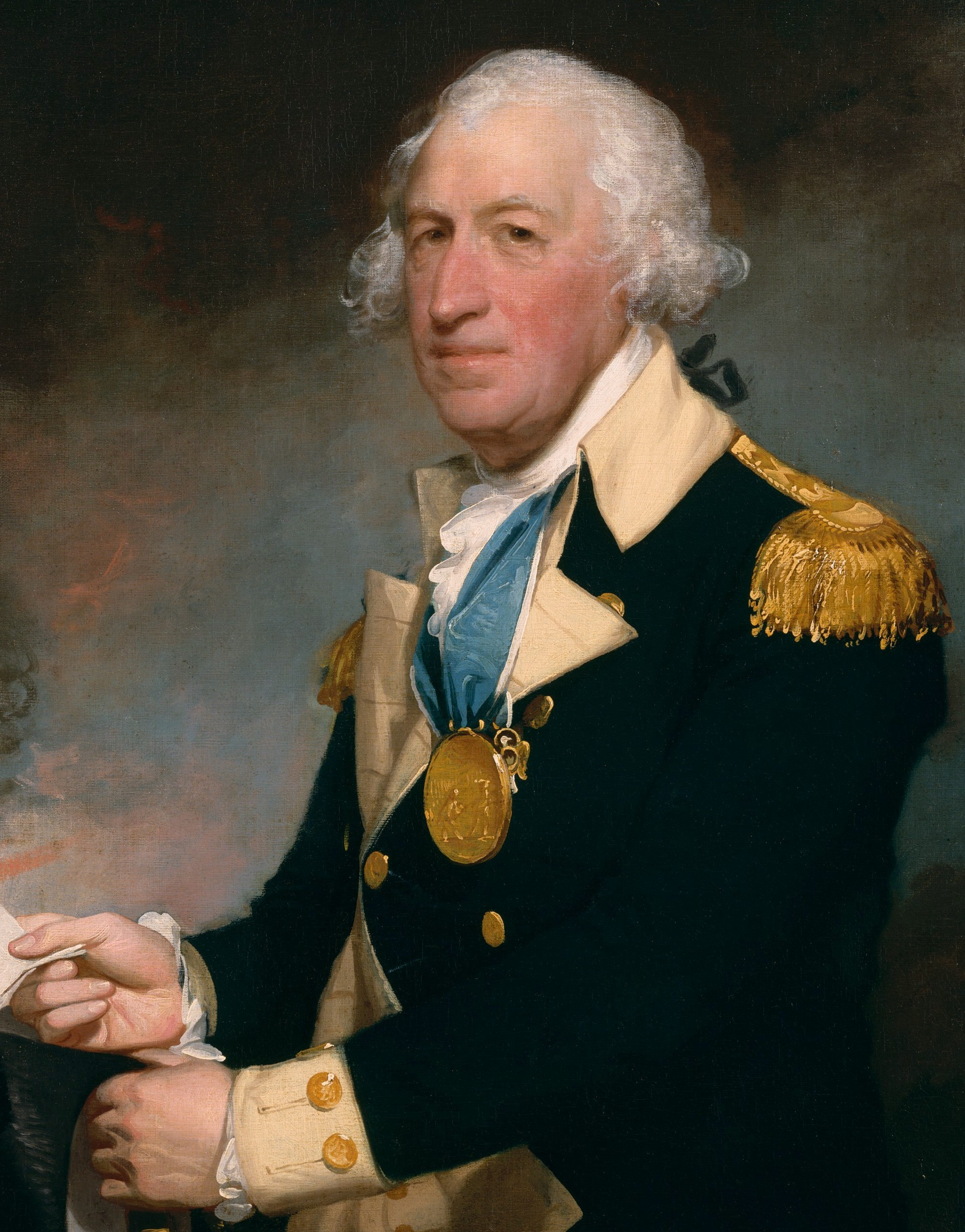
Horatio Gates is married to Elizabeth Phillips on October 20, 1754

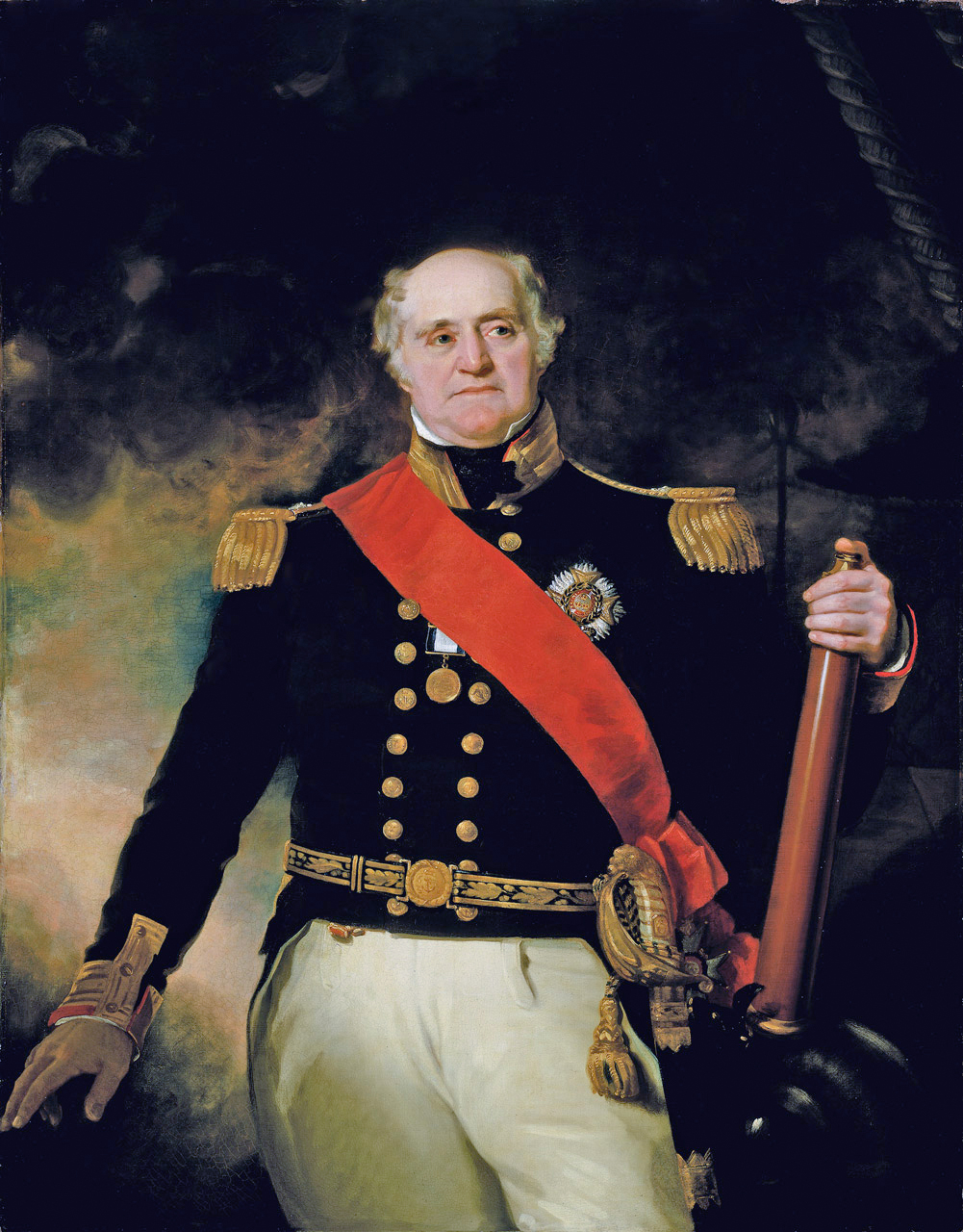
Sir Thomas Masterman Hardy, married daughter of Sir George Cranfield Berkeley, 17 November 1807

=== Funerals ===
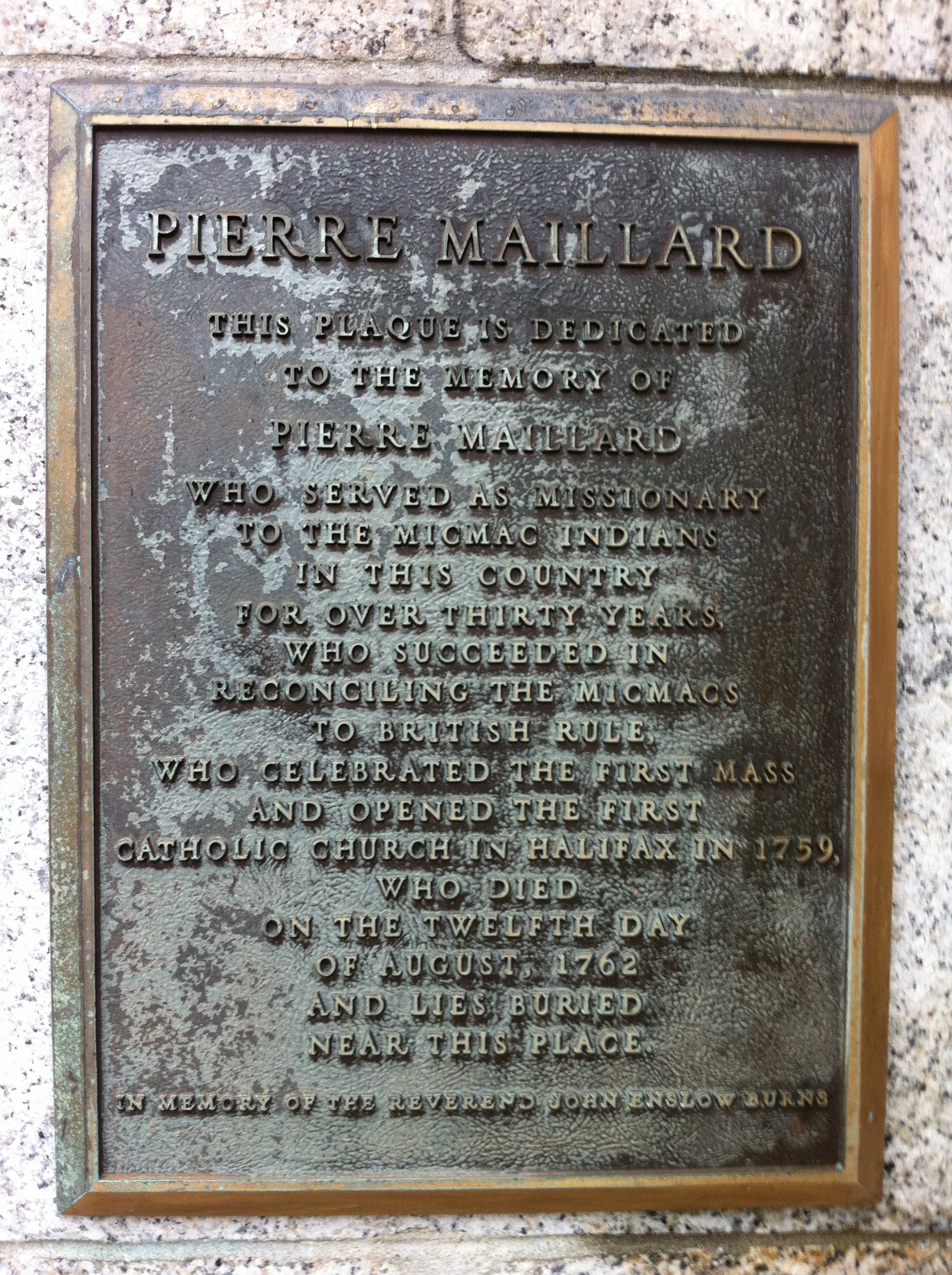
Catholic Priest Pierre Maillard funeral is attended by large number of Mi'kmaq (1762)

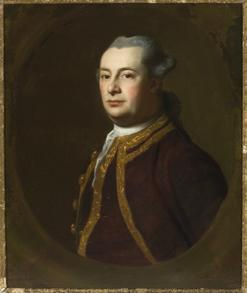
NS Governor Michael Francklin funeral is attended by a large number of Mi'kmaq (1782)

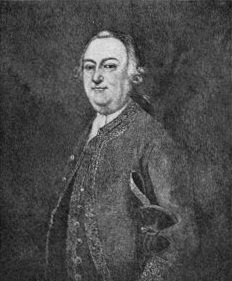
Funeral of John Winslow's brother Edward Winslow, died 1784

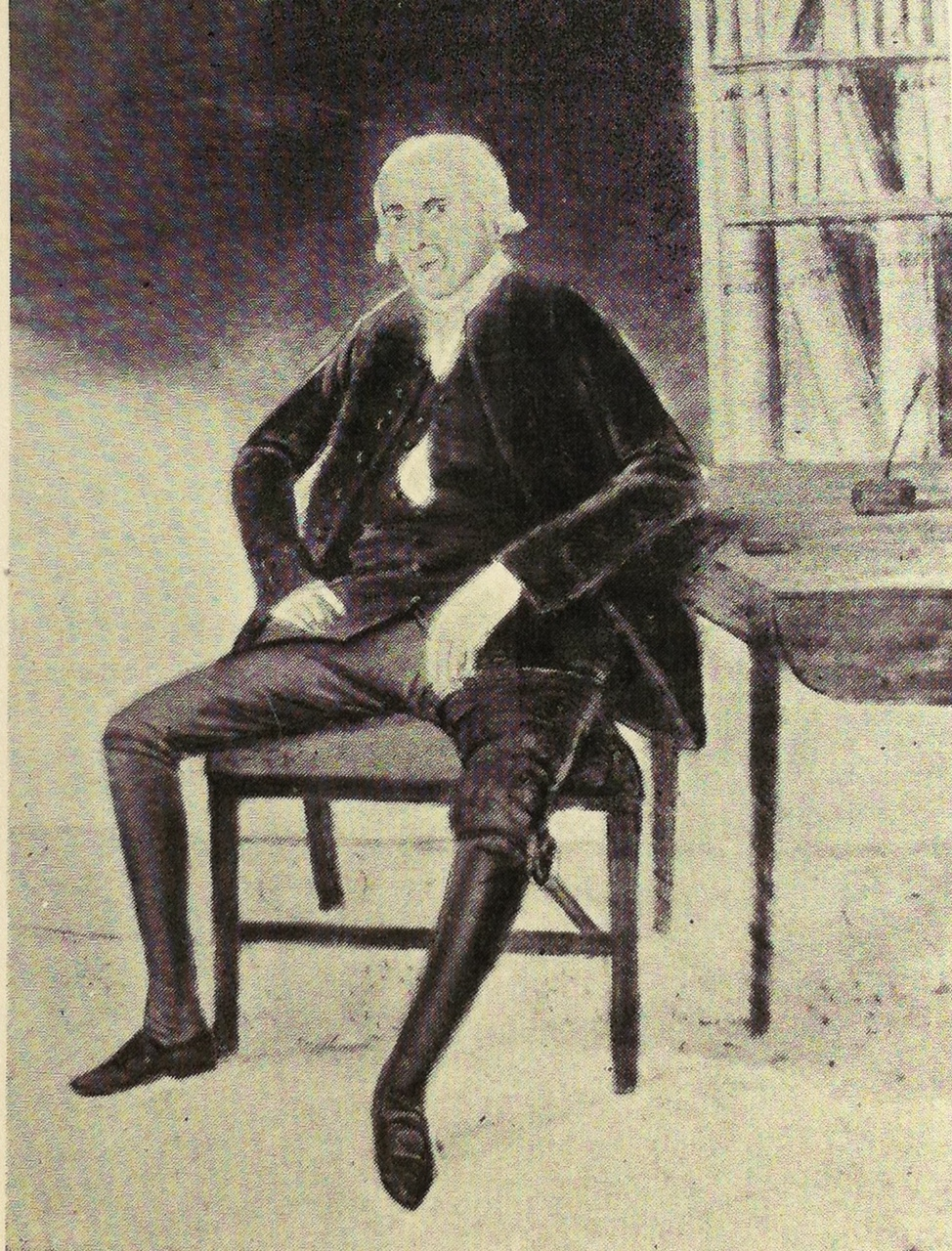
Funeral for Richard Bulkeley, died 1800, was "the largest ever seen in Halifax."

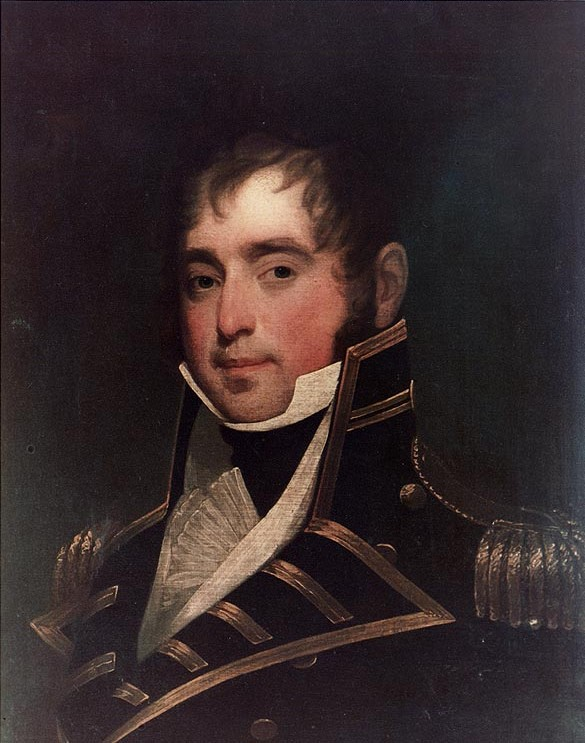
Captain James Lawrence, USS Chesapeake (1813)

=== Royal visits ===
- Saint Paul's has a royal pew, and many royal guests have visited, including the father of Queen Victoria, Prince Edward, and Princesses Michael (1984), Margaret, Alexandra, and Elizabeth (Queen Elizabeth II), and Prince Edward in 1987. However, HRH Prince George, later to become King George V of the United Kingdom, declined to use the royal pew during his visits to Halifax as the commander of HMS Thrush (1891).
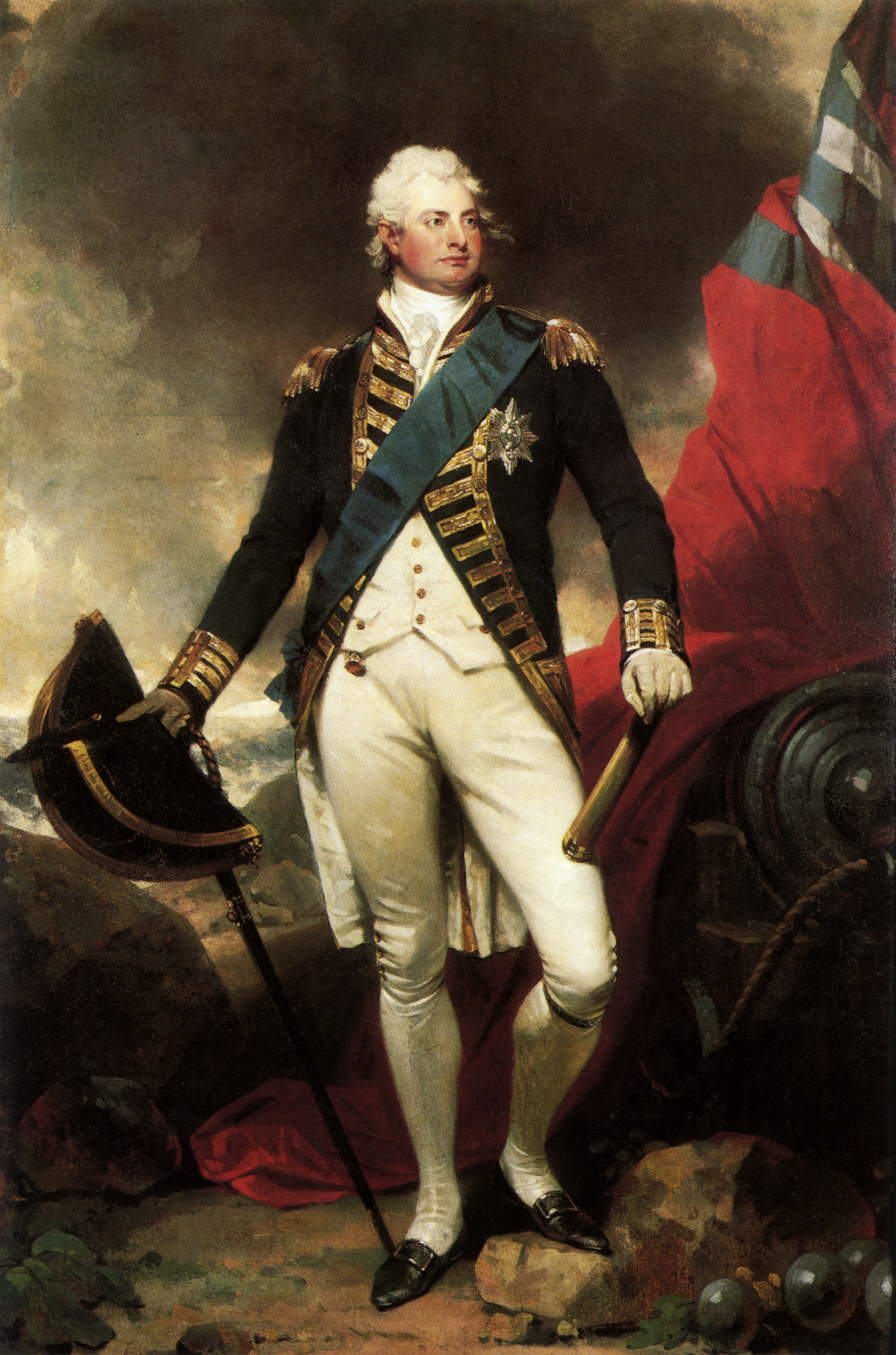
Prince William Henry - later King William IV attended (1786)

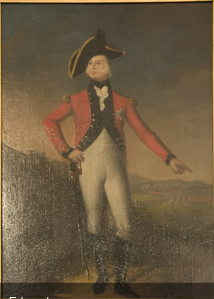
Prince Edward attended (1794)

Prince Edward, later King Edward VII attended (1860)

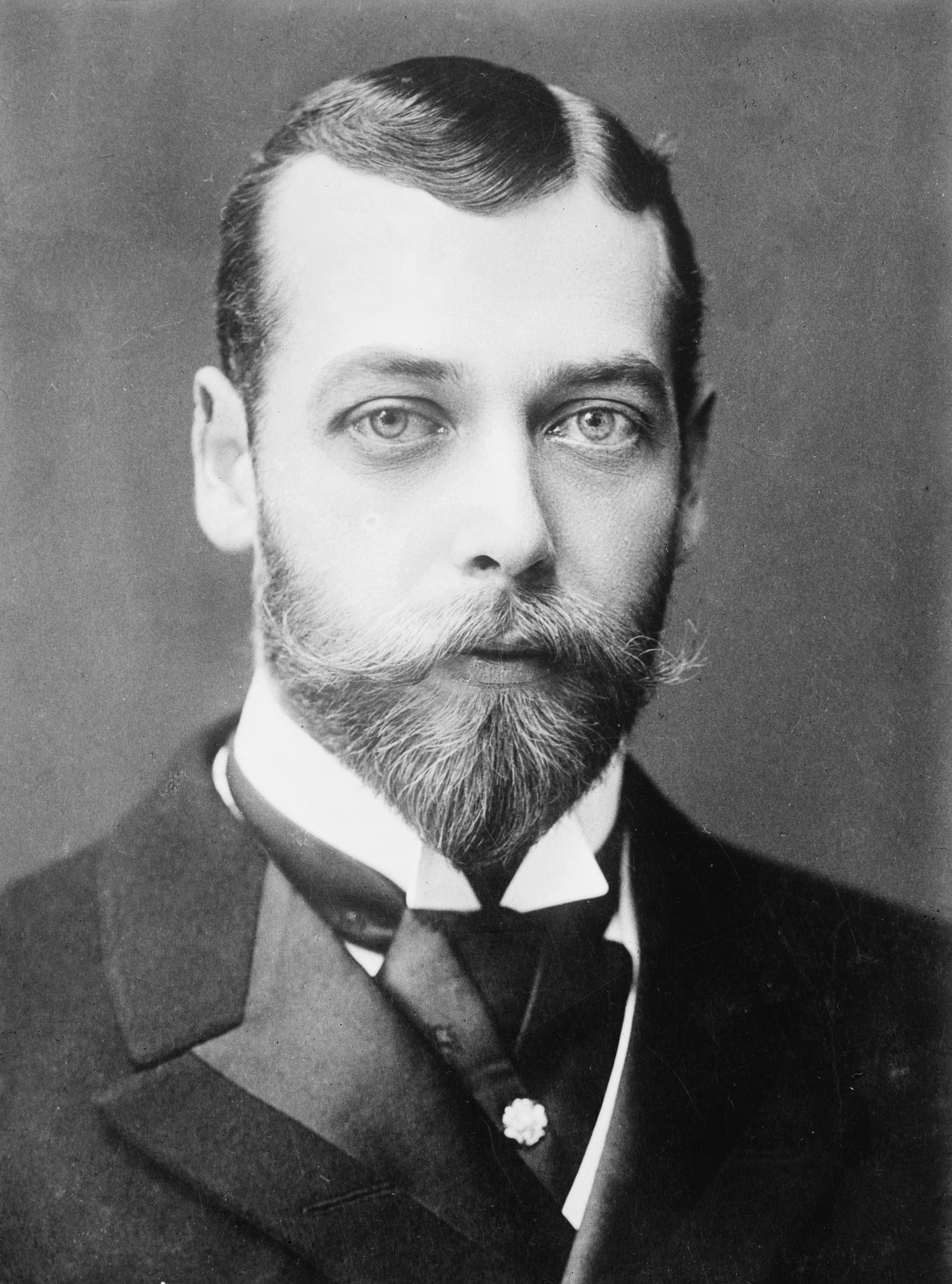
George V (1891)

=== Halifax Explosion ===
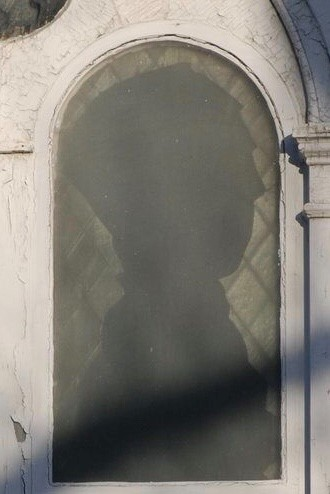
Explosion Window – Silhouette of a man believed to be Abbe Moreau

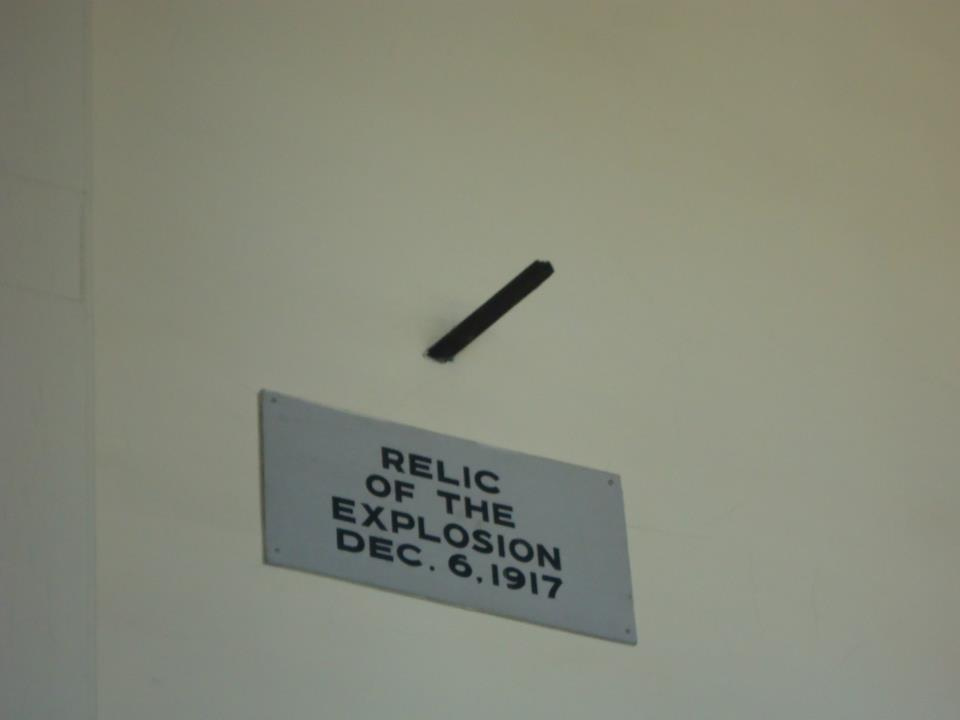
Airborne debris of the Halifax Explosion

St. Paul's Church played a significant role in the Halifax Explosion. Doctors used the church as an emergency hospital, using the two vestries to tend to the wounded, while the bodies of the dead were stacked on top of each other around the walls of the nave. Only one stained glass window was broken in the church; however, most of the other windows were smashed, and there were wide cracks in the roof. It was the only church in the city considered safe enough to conduct a service the following day. All the congregations used the church to conduct funerals.

There remains two artifacts in the church from this disaster: the "Explosion Window", which shattered to form a silhouette of a man's head and shoulders. The congregation concluded that the silhouette is the likeness of Abbe Moreau, who arrived with Cornwallis. There is also a piece of a steel window frame that remains embedded in the wall of the vestibule above the inside doors to the church.

== See also ==
- Little Dutch (Deutsch) Church
- St. Matthew's United Church (Halifax)
- St. John's Anglican Church (Lunenburg)
- List of oldest buildings and structures in Halifax, Nova Scotia
- History of the Halifax Regional Municipality
- History of Nova Scotia
- Military history of Nova Scotia
- List of oldest buildings in Canada
