= Great Pontack =

Large three-story building in Halifax, Nova Scotia

Coordinates: 44.650°N 63.573°W

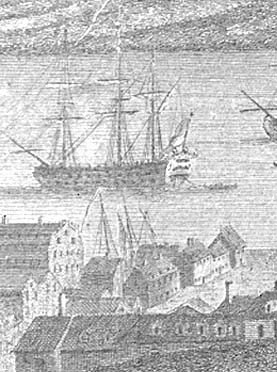
Great Pontack (extreme left), Halifax, Nova Scotia, 1759

The Great Pontack (also known as Great Pontac, Pontack Inn, Pontiac Inn, Pontack Hotel, Pontack House and Pontac Tavern) was a large three-story building, erected by John Butler and run by John Willis, prior to 1754, at the corner of Duke and Water Streets in Halifax, Nova Scotia. (Present-day sites of the Waterside Centre and the Pontac House at the Historic Properties (Halifax).) It was named after the famous Pontack Club in London. The first resident professional company in Canada was The American Company of Comedians, believed to have performed at The Great Pontack, Halifax, in the summer and fall of 1768. (A lively garrison and amateur theatrical tradition emerged in the Maritimes, among these was a romantic comedy called Acadius: or, Love in a Calm, the first recorded English Canadian play, performed in Halifax in 1774.)

The most famous event to take place at the establishment was on May 24, 1758, when James Wolfe, who was headquartered on Hollis Street, Halifax, threw a party at the Great Pontack prior to departing for the Siege of Louisbourg (1758). Wolfe and his men purchased 70 bottles of Madeira wine, 50 bottles of claret and 25 bottles of brandy. Four days later, on May 29 the invasion fleet departed. Wolfe returned to his headquarters in Halifax and the Great Pontack before his Battle of the Plains of Abraham.

The building housed auctions, dramatic productions, balls and civic ceremonies. The building contained a slaughter-house, ballroom, public conveniences, bakers, butchers’ stalls and stabling. It was the principal hotel in Halifax. On the first floor was the kitchen. There were several assembly rooms on the second floor. There was also a large veranda which encompassed the four sides of the building off the second floor.

== Events ==
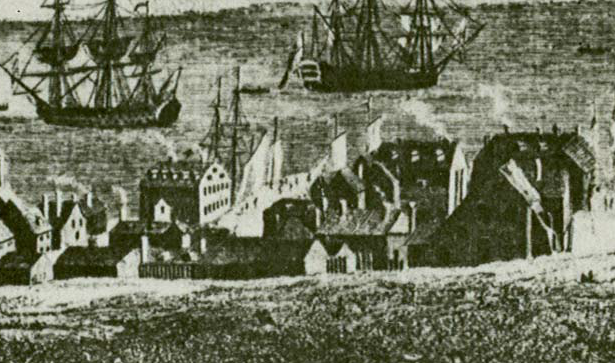
Great Pontack, 1760

The Great Pontack was well known in the early years of the city and often hosted prominent members of Halifax society. In October 1754, on the day of the swearing in of the first Chief Justice of Nova Scotia, Jonathan Belcher in his scarlet robes walked out of the Governor’s House with Lieutenant Governor Charles Lawrence and others. The dignified procession walked to the Pontack and entered the long room where they were served a formal breakfast. Afterward Belcher was escorted to the courthouse, where his first official act was to exhort a grand jury to wield the "sword of Justice" to protect the innocent and to strike terror into "the noxious and guilty." This moment in legal history marked Canada’s first superior court open for business.

== Auctions ==
On 4 June 1756, there was an auction sale of a vessel which was selling arms to the Acadians and Mi’kmaq that was captured off present-day Prince Edward Island by HMS Success under Captain John Rous.

== Theatre ==
There was a courtyard in the centre of building for wagons. The courtyard was also used to mount theatrical productions. Actors were mainly gentlemen of the Navy, the Army, and the town. There were several famous productions that were mounted for various benefits: playwright David Garrick's The Guardian and The Lying Valet and Benjamin Hoadly's The Suspicious Husband and The Rake.

== Meetings ==
The North British Society was among the more important groups to hold regular meetings and to celebrate special occasions at the Great Pontack.

The Great Pontack served the function of the Lloyd's of London office for ship owners, other business men and financiers of the town, who met in the Guild of Merchants’ chamber in the establishment.

In the 1780s, Richard Bulkeley (governor), and about twenty others founded a chess club, which met once a fortnight at the Pontac Tavern.

== Decline ==
It was built prior to 1754 by and first operated by a Jerseyman named Decartaret. John Willis took ownership of the building in 1769. The Pontack was partially destroyed by a fire in 1837, rebuilt and briefly occupied and eventually purchased by Imperial Oil Limited in 1925.

== Guests and Patrons ==
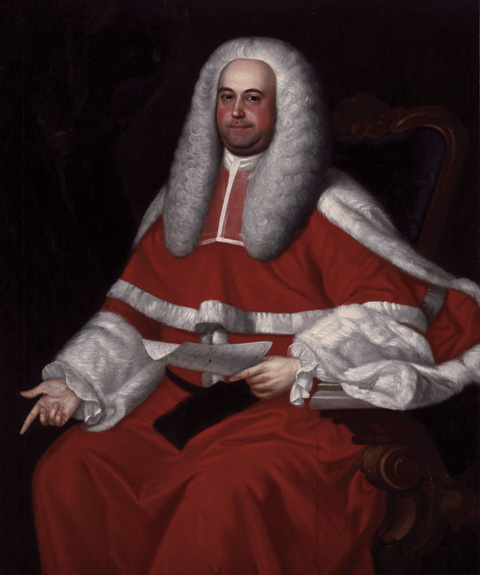
Governor Jonathan Belcher

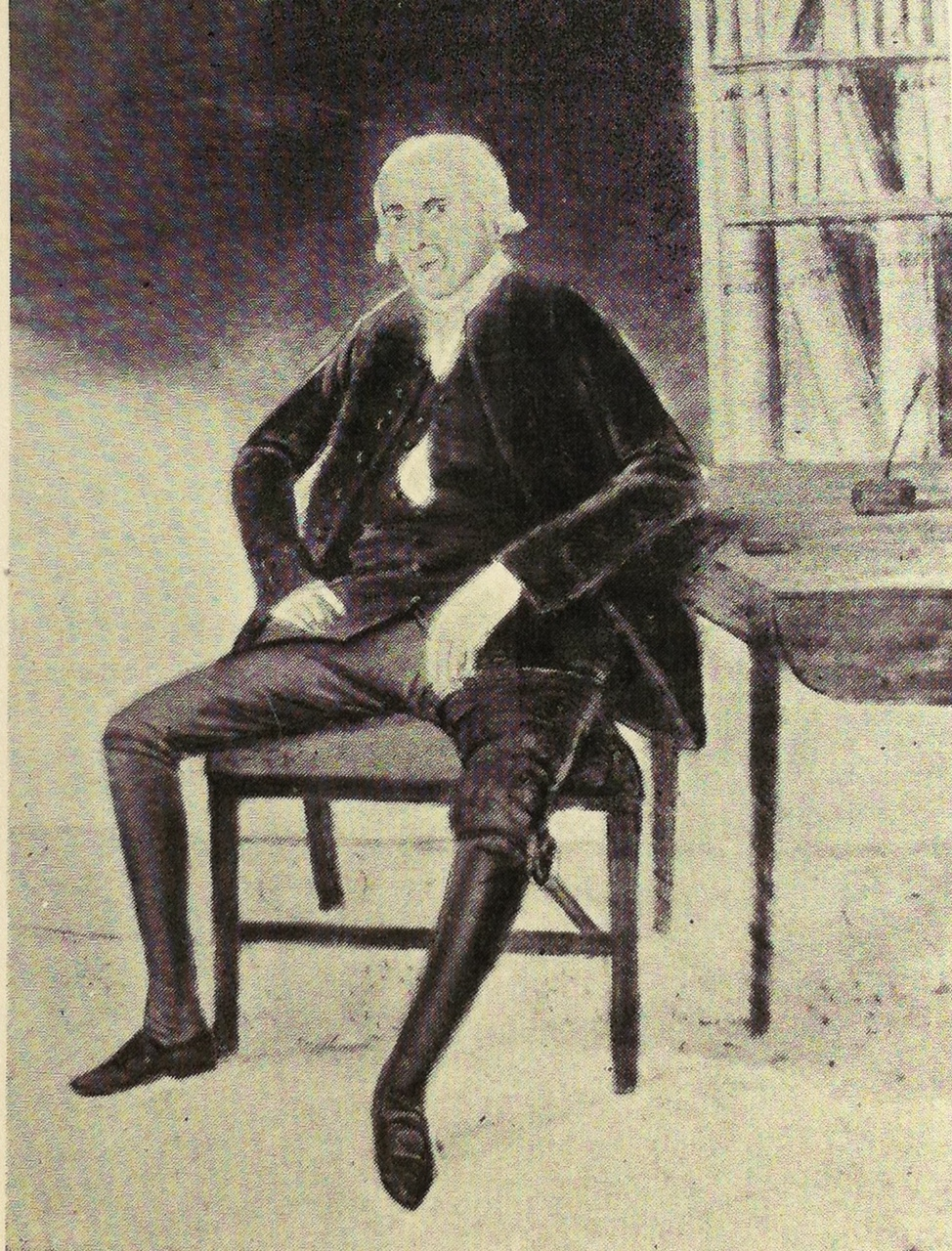
Richard Bulkleley

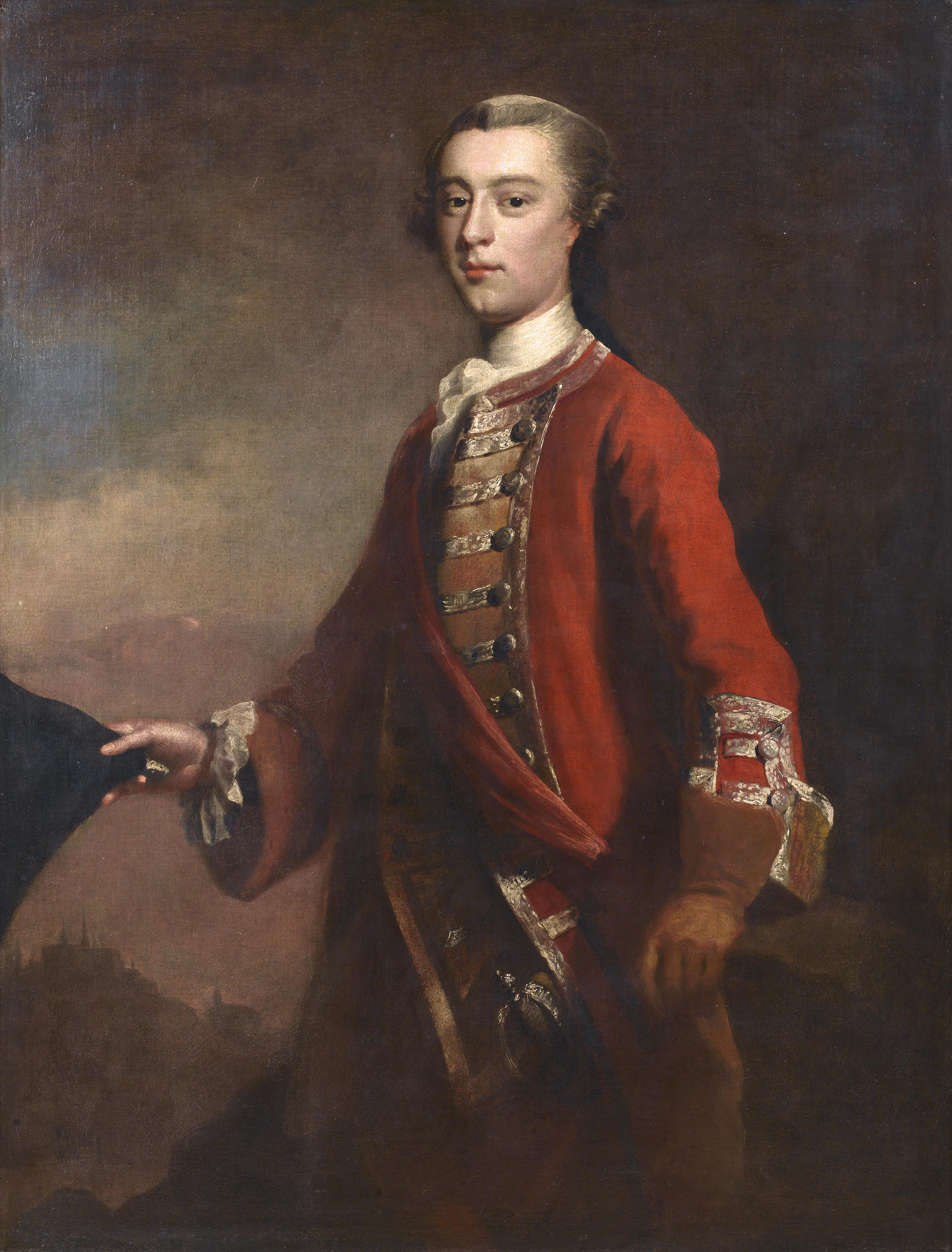
Major James Wolfe

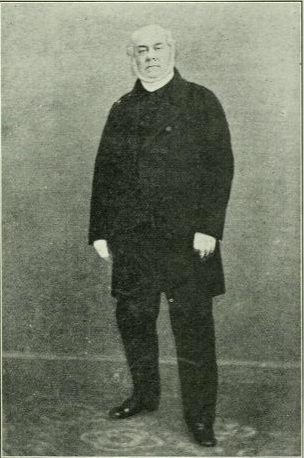
Duncan Clark (surgeon)

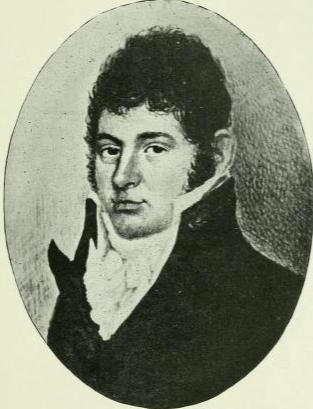
John Halliburton (surgeon)

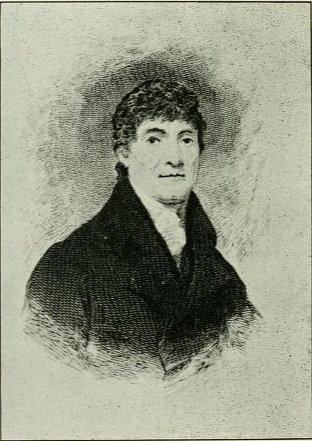
John Gillespie, 1st President of North British Society

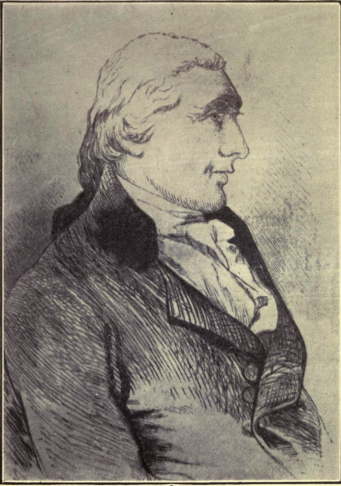
Alexander Brymer

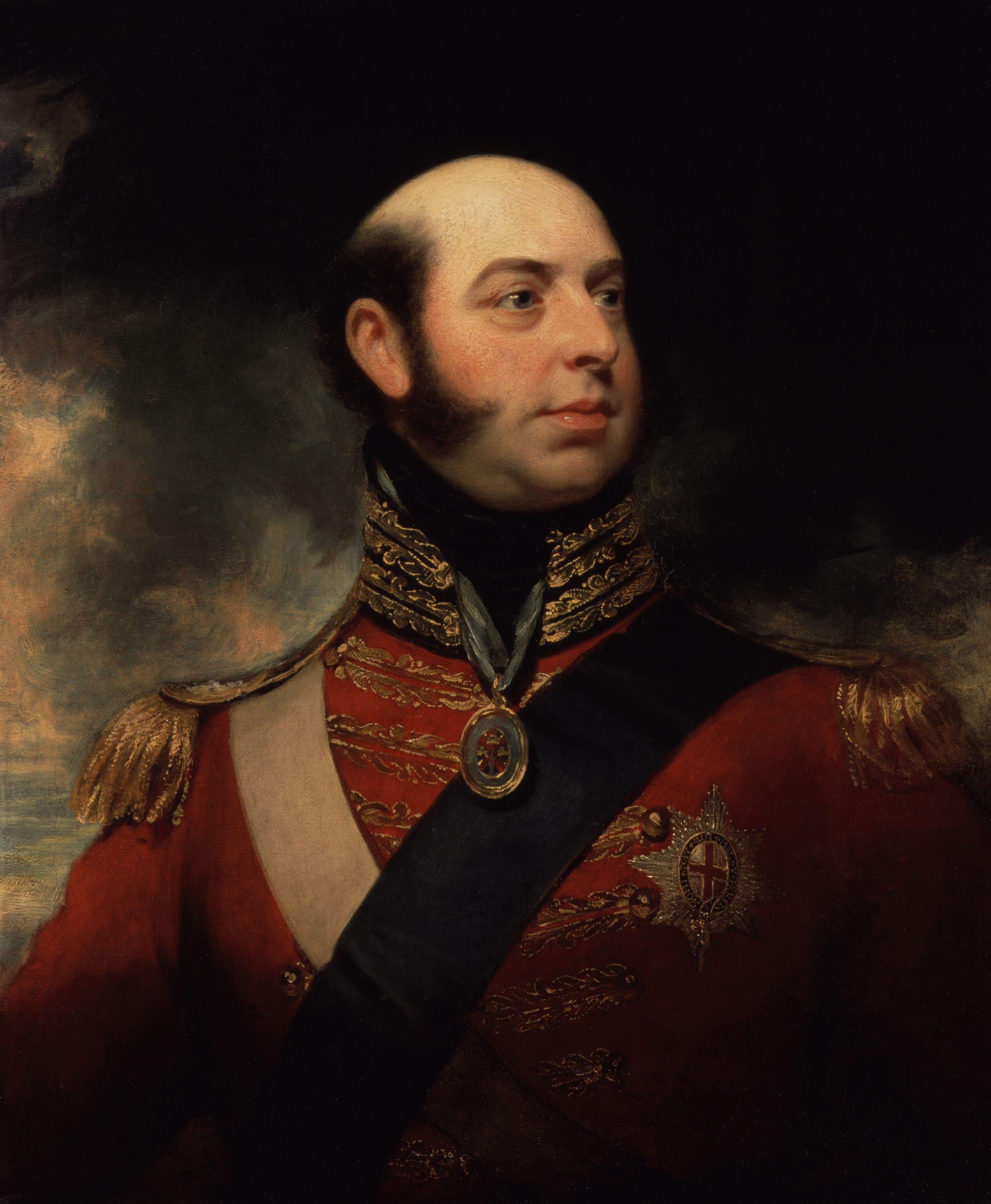
Prince Edward

== See also ==
- The Carleton
- List of oldest buildings and structures in Halifax, Nova Scotia
