= Henry Cogswell =

Henry Cogswell may refer to:

- Henry D. Cogswell (1820–1900), American dentist and crusader in the temperance movement
- Henry Hezekiah Cogswell (1776–1854), lawyer, political figure and philanthropist in Nova Scotia
