= Richard Bulkeley (civil servant) =

Irish-born administrator in Nova Scotia from 1749-1800

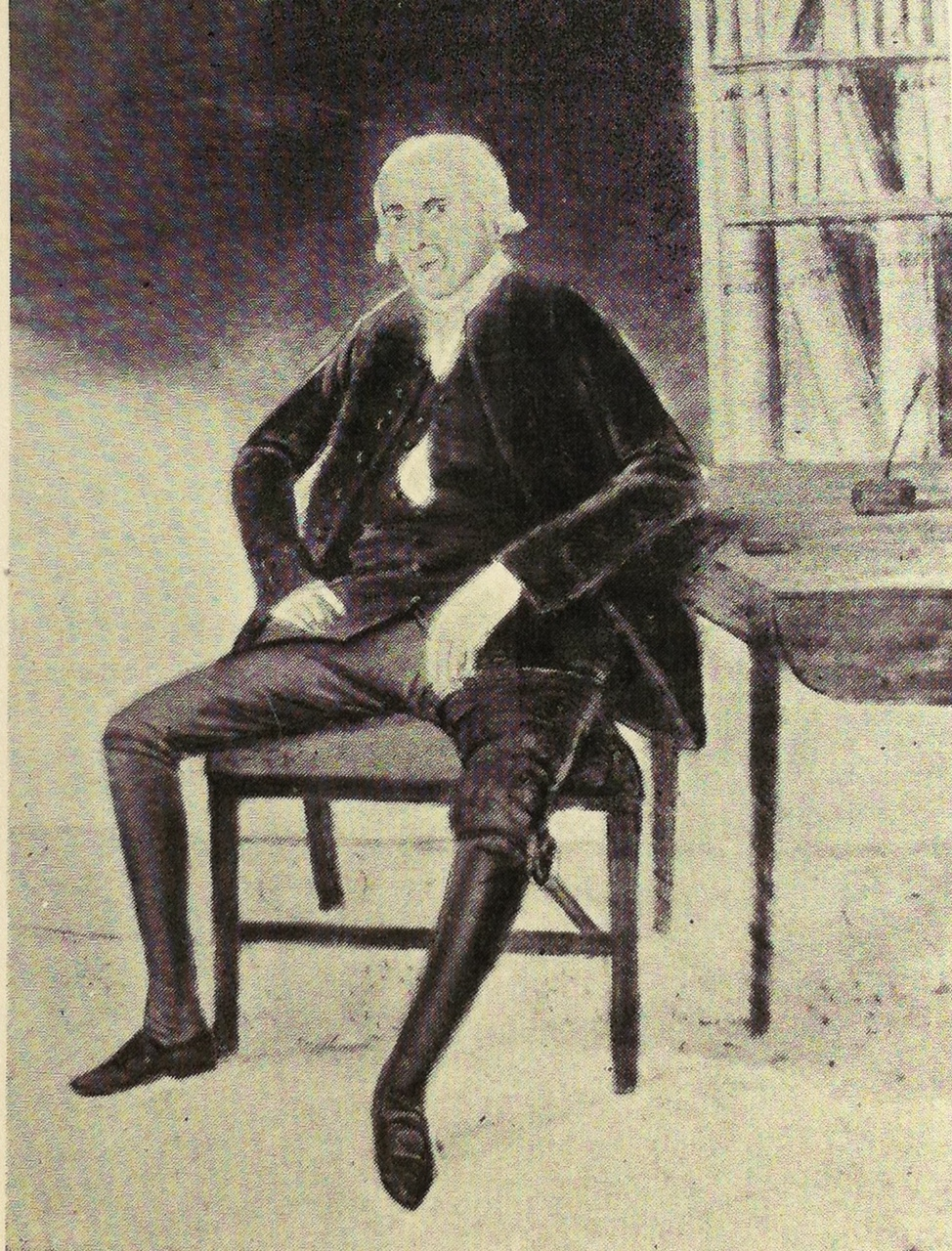
- Richard Bulkeley - self portrait
- Born: 26 December 1717; Dublin, Ireland
- Died: 7 December 1800 (aged 82); Halifax, Nova Scotia
- Burial place: St. Paul's Church (Halifax)
- Military career
- Allegiance: Kingdom of Great Britain
- Conflicts: War of the Austrian Succession; Father Le Loutre's War; Seven Years' War

Richard Bulkeley (26 December 1717 – 7 December 1800) was an influential administrator in Nova Scotia from 1749 to 1800. Historian Phyllis Blakeley writes that Bulkeley, "assisted 13 governors and lieutenant governors from Cornwallis to Wentworth. In half a century of service he took part in the founding of Halifax, the immigration of New Englanders and loyalists, and the prosperity of the French revolutionary wars." During his lifetime, known for hosting dignitaries and grand parties, he was known as "the Father of the Province." When he died, he was the last surviving settler who arrived with Cornwallis.

== Career ==
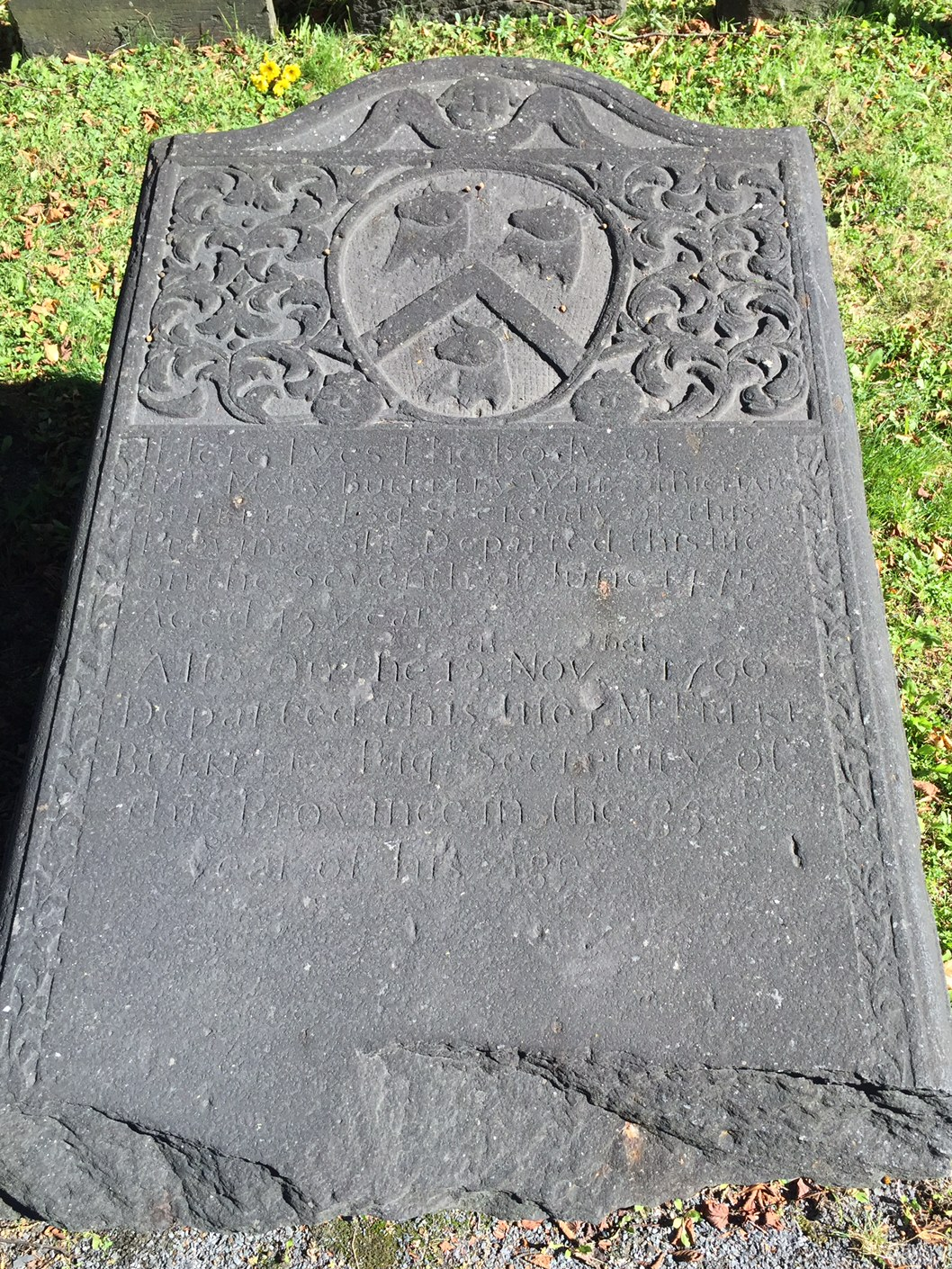
Mary (Rous) Bulkeley, d. 1775, 3 Bulls in Bulkeley Family Coat of Arms, Old Burying Ground (Halifax, Nova Scotia)

During Father Le Loutre's War he was an Aide-de-camp to three consecutive Governors of Nova Scotia: Cornwallis, Hobson and Lawrence.

During the French and Indian War he also served on the Nova Scotia Council (1759-1800). Historian Blakney writes that Bulkeley was "noted for his lavish hospitality, entertaining and many other military men during the Seven Years' War and the American revolution.

Bulkeley's first home was opposite St Paul's. The dining room could seat 50. Wolfe used his home as his headquarters prior to the Siege of Louisbourg (1758) and Quebec (1759). (In 1911, the Nova Scotia Historical Society created a plaque to mark the location at Robert Standford's premises, 156-158 Hollis Street.) He converted this residence into his library and private office once he built his new home on Argyle Street.

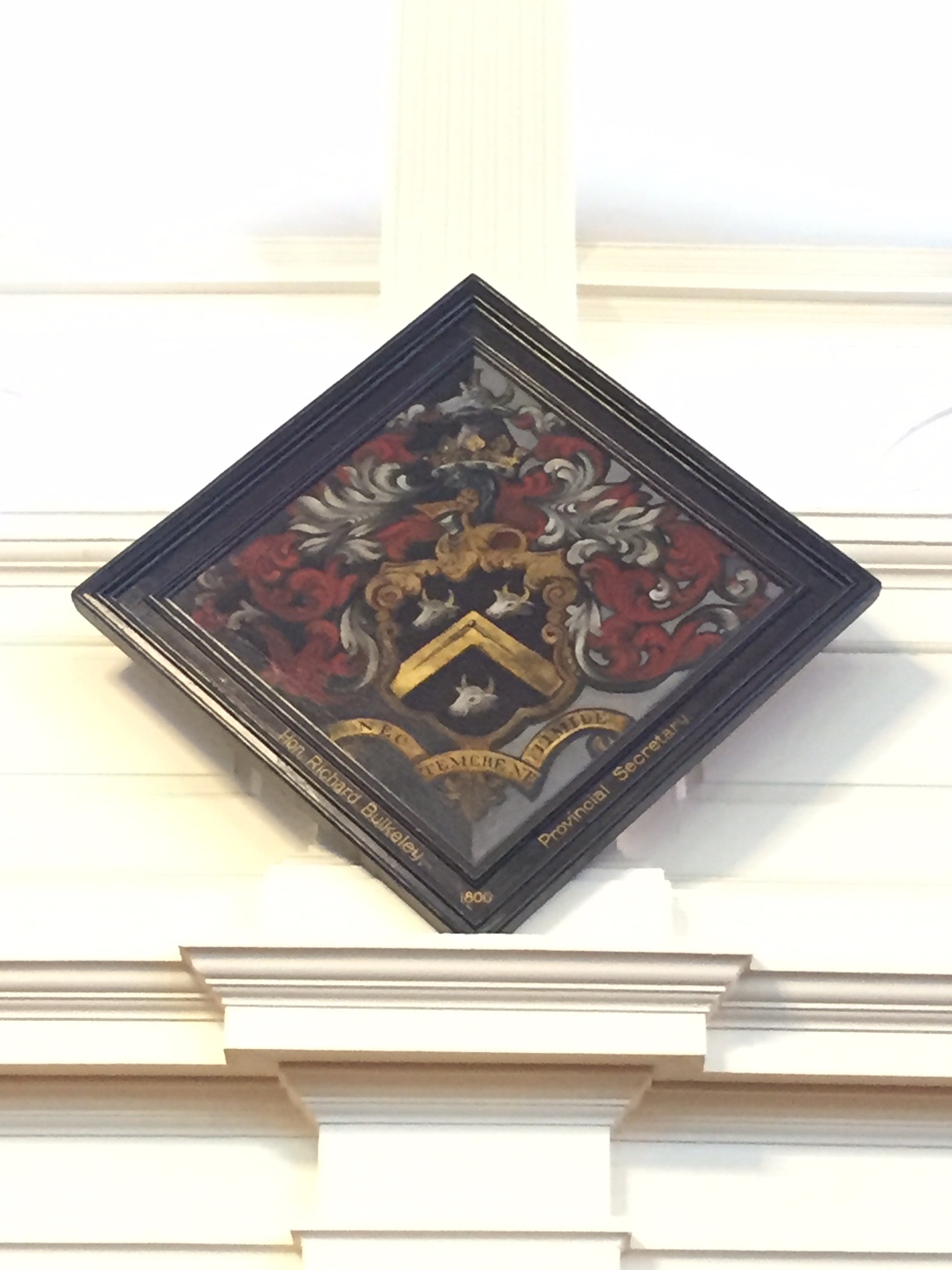
Richard Bulkeley, funerary hatchment, St. Paul's Church (Halifax), Nova Scotia

Bulkeley helped negotiate the peace treaties that led to the Burying the Hatchet ceremony, which ended 75 years of warfare between the Mi'kmaq and the British.

In the 1780s, Richard Bulkeley (governor), and about twenty others founded a chess club, which met once a fortnight at the Great Pontack (Halifax).

He served in many capacities the crown and people of Nova Scotia and was governor from 1791 to 1792; Bulkeley was succeeded by Former New Hampshire Governor Sir John Wentworth.

Bulkeley was a friend of Historian William Cobbett, who visited him in Halifax.

== The Carleton ==
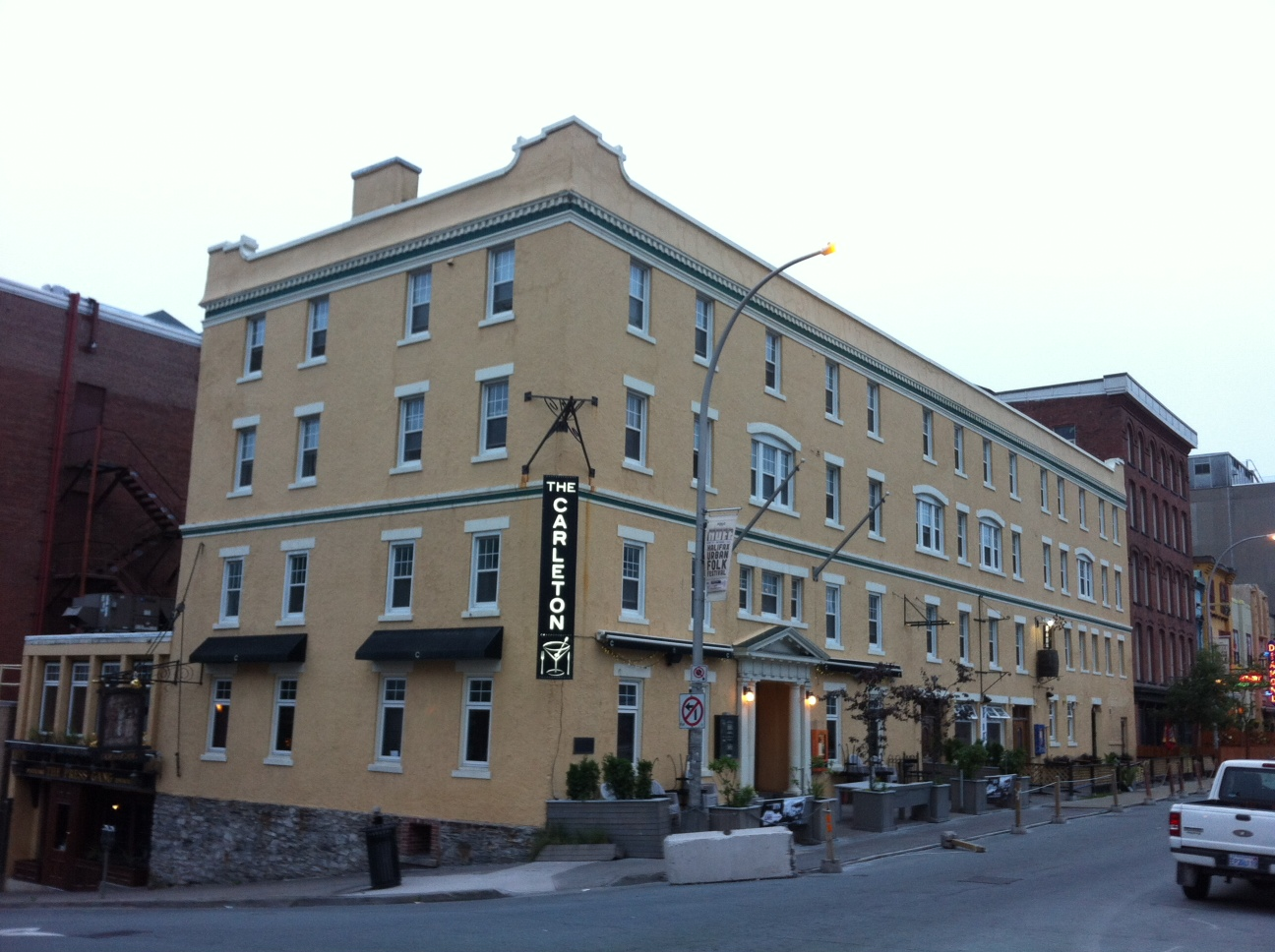
The Carleton, Halifax, Nova Scotia

Apart from two churches, Bulkeley's home is the oldest building in Halifax, Nova Scotia (1760). Since 1867 his residence has been known as "The Carleton." Bulkeley built his new home on Argyle Street from stone he brought from the ruins of Louisbourg (1758). He also had installed the black marble mantel from the Governor's house at Louisbourg. At his new home in the 1780s, Bulkeley regularly entertained the future King William IV (abolished slavery in British Empire; had an affair with Governor Wentworth's wife Francis) as well as Prince Edward (father of Queen Victoria). He also held large levees there on New Year's Day and the queen's birthday, as well as dinners on St Patrick's and St George's days." He named his home Carleton House after Guy Carleton, 1st Baron Dorchester upon his visit to Halifax in 1786. Bulkeley's widow eventually sold the residence to Henry Hezekiah Cogswell (1816).

== Life ==
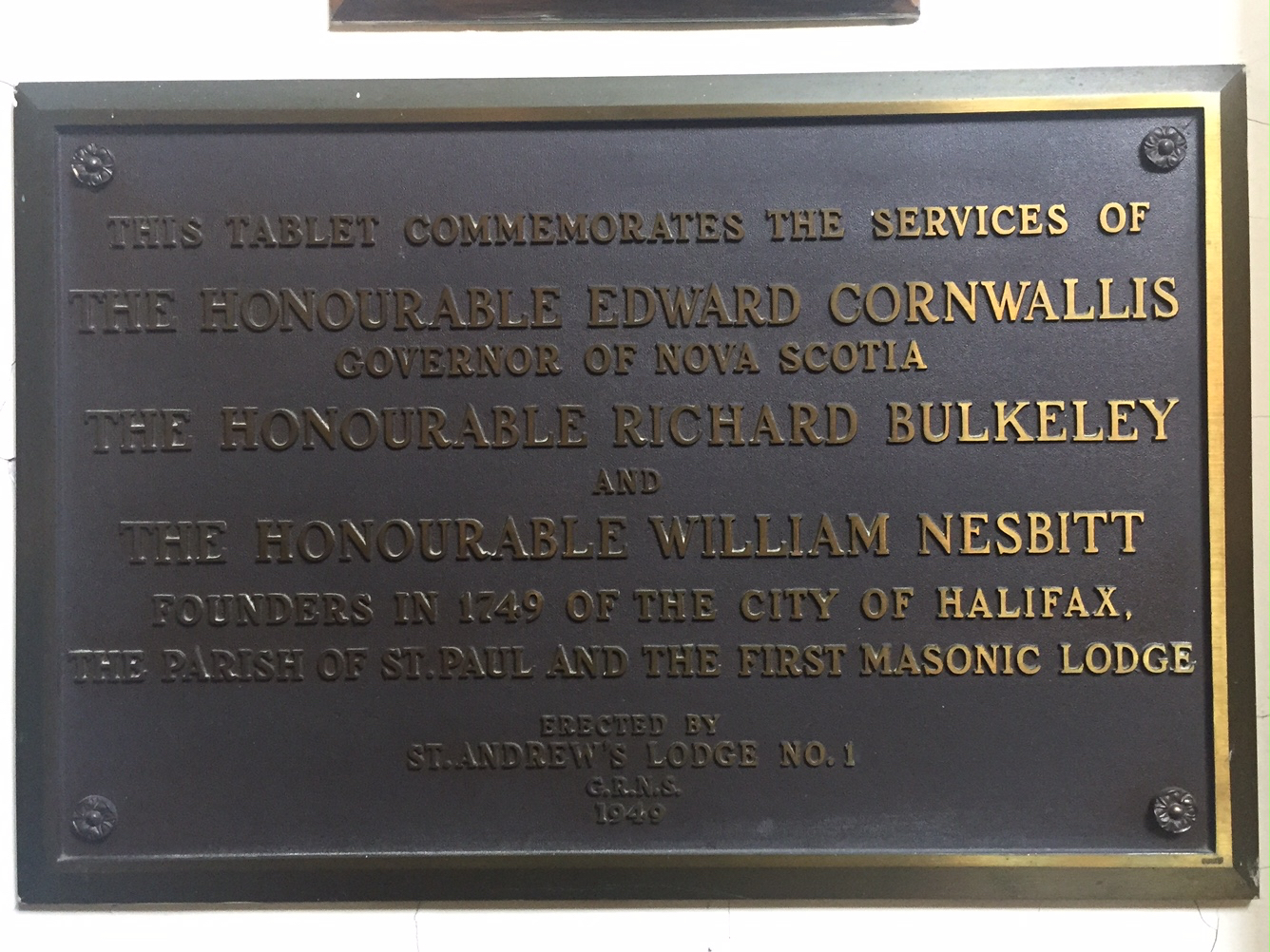
Edward Cornwallis, Richard Bulkeley, William Nesbitt Plaque, St. Paul's Church (Halifax), Nova Scotia

Bulkeley was born in Dublin, Ireland, the second son of Sir Lawrence Bulkeley and Elizabeth Freke. He married on 18 July 1750 Mary Rous, daughter of John Rous, at Halifax, Nova Scotia, and they had four sons; after her death, he married, on 26 July 1776, Mary Burgess at Halifax; and died there 7 December 1800. His burial place is reported to be marked by a rough stone in St. Paul's Church cemetery (Old Burying Ground (Halifax, Nova Scotia)), presumably close to the gravestone of his wife Mary Rous.

== Legacy ==
Bulkeley was instrumental in serving in the position or establishing the following:

- Charitable Irish Society of Halifax
- St. Paul's Church (Halifax)
- Secretary of Nova Scotia (35 years) (1759–93)
- Judge of Admiralty court (25 years)
- Member of Nova Scotia Council (41 years) (1759-1800)
- Brigadier General of Militia
- Secretary of Nova Scotia Council
- Register in Chancery
- Commander of Courts Escheat and Forfeiture
- Justice of the Peace for Nova Scotia
- Grand Master of Free-Masons
- Editor of the Halifax Gazette
- Warden of St. Paul's Church (Halifax) (50 years)
- Organist and Leader of St. Paul's choir
- Founder of King's College and Academy, Windsor
- President of Agricultural Society
- President of Chess, Pencil and Brush Clubs (30 years)
- Chairman and organizer of First Board of Fire Wards

== Links ==
- The Carleton
- Bulkeley's rational for the Expulsion of the Acadians

Political offices
Preceded by John Parr	Lieutenant-Governor of Nova Scotia (acting); 1791-1792	Succeeded by Sir John Wentworth
