= Brenton Halliburton =

Sir Brenton Halliburton
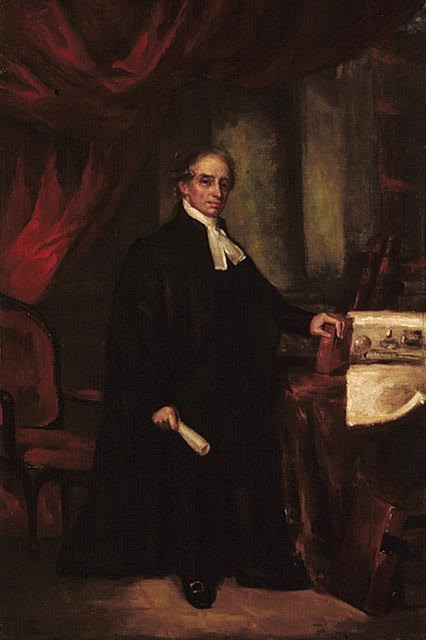

Chief Justice of the Nova Scotia Supreme Court
- In office 1833–1860
- Preceded by: Sampson Salter Blowers
- Succeeded by: William Young

Personal details
- Born: December 27, 1774 Newport, Colony of Rhode Island
- Died: July 16, 1860 (aged 85) Halifax, Colony of Nova Scotia
- Profession: Judge

Sir Brenton Halliburton (December 27, 1774 – July 16, 1860) was the eighth Chief Justice of the Supreme Court of Nova Scotia.

He was the son of John Halliburton. He married the daughter of Bishop Charles Inglis, Margaret Inglis, in 1799. He was named to the Nova Scotia Council in 1815, serving until judges were removed from the Council in 1837. His portrait was done in 1849 by Albert Gallatin Hoit. Nova Scotian artist William Valentine painted Haliburton's portrait. He presided over the Libel trial of Joseph Howe, for which his son John C. Halliburton eventually challenged Joseph Howe to a duel in Point Pleasant Park. Halliburton was also a member of the North British Society. He also served in the Royal Nova Scotia Regiment. He supported the Royal Acadian School. He lived in the home he grew up in, the Bower, that still stands in Halifax.

== Legacy ==
- namesake of Brenton St. and Brenton Point, Halifax, Nova Scotia
- his wife is the namesake of Margaretsville, Nova Scotia

== Gallery ==
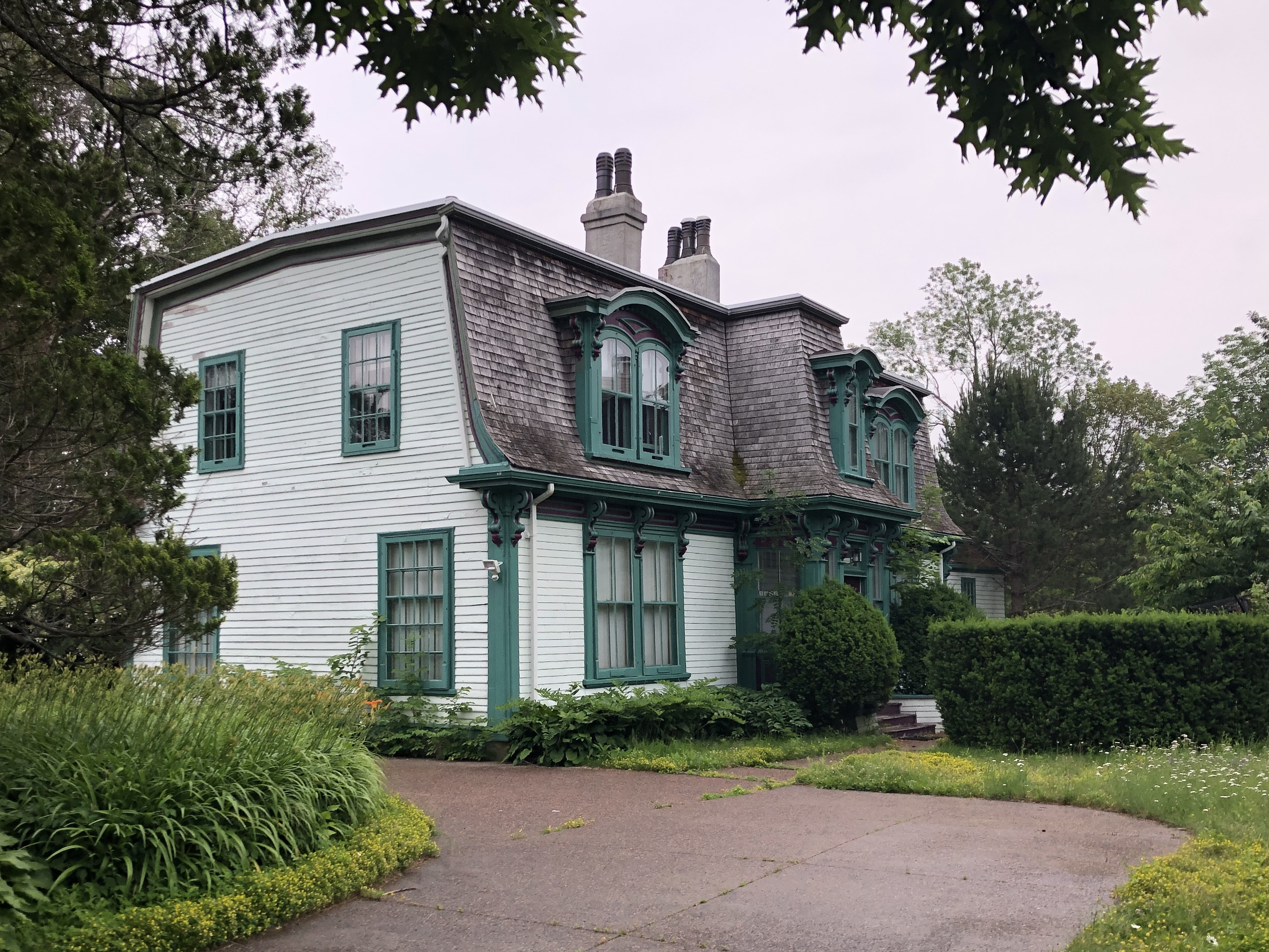
The Bower, Halifax, Nova Scotia

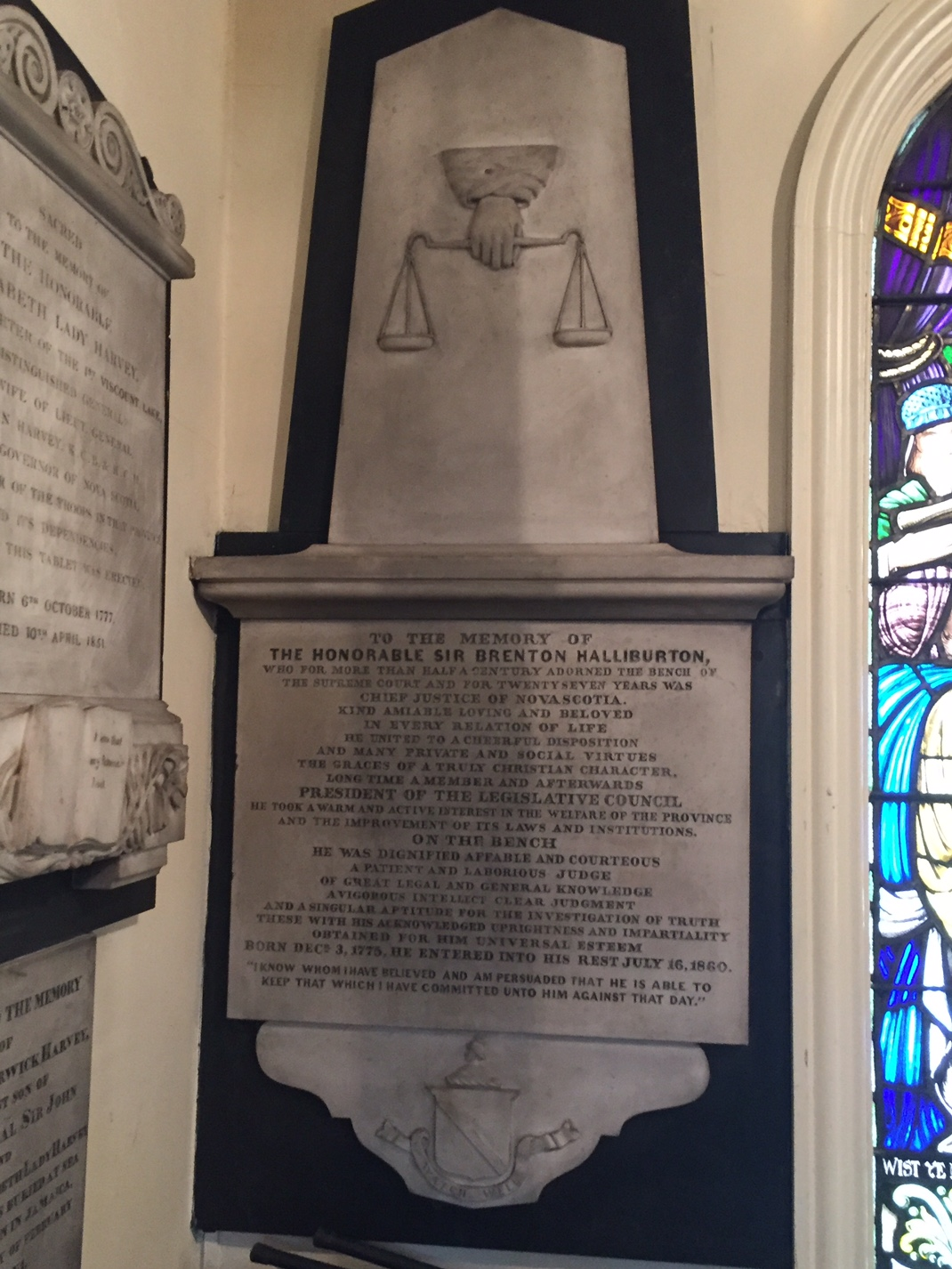
Brenton Halliburton, St. Paul's Church (Halifax), Nova Scotia

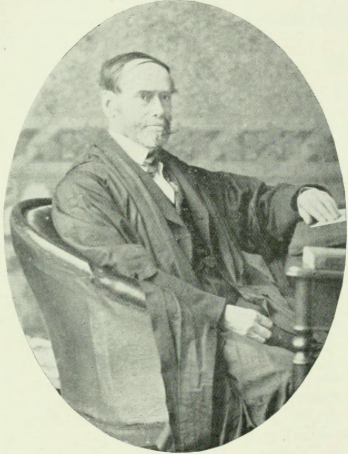
John C. Halliburton (1801-1884) - challenged Howe to a duel to defend his father's reputation
