= Isabella Binney Cogswell =

Canadian businesswoman

- Born: 6 July 1819; Halifax, Nova Scotia, British Empire
- Died: 6 December 1874 (aged 55); Halifax, Nova Scotia, Canada
- Known for: philanthropy
- Parent: Henry Cogswell

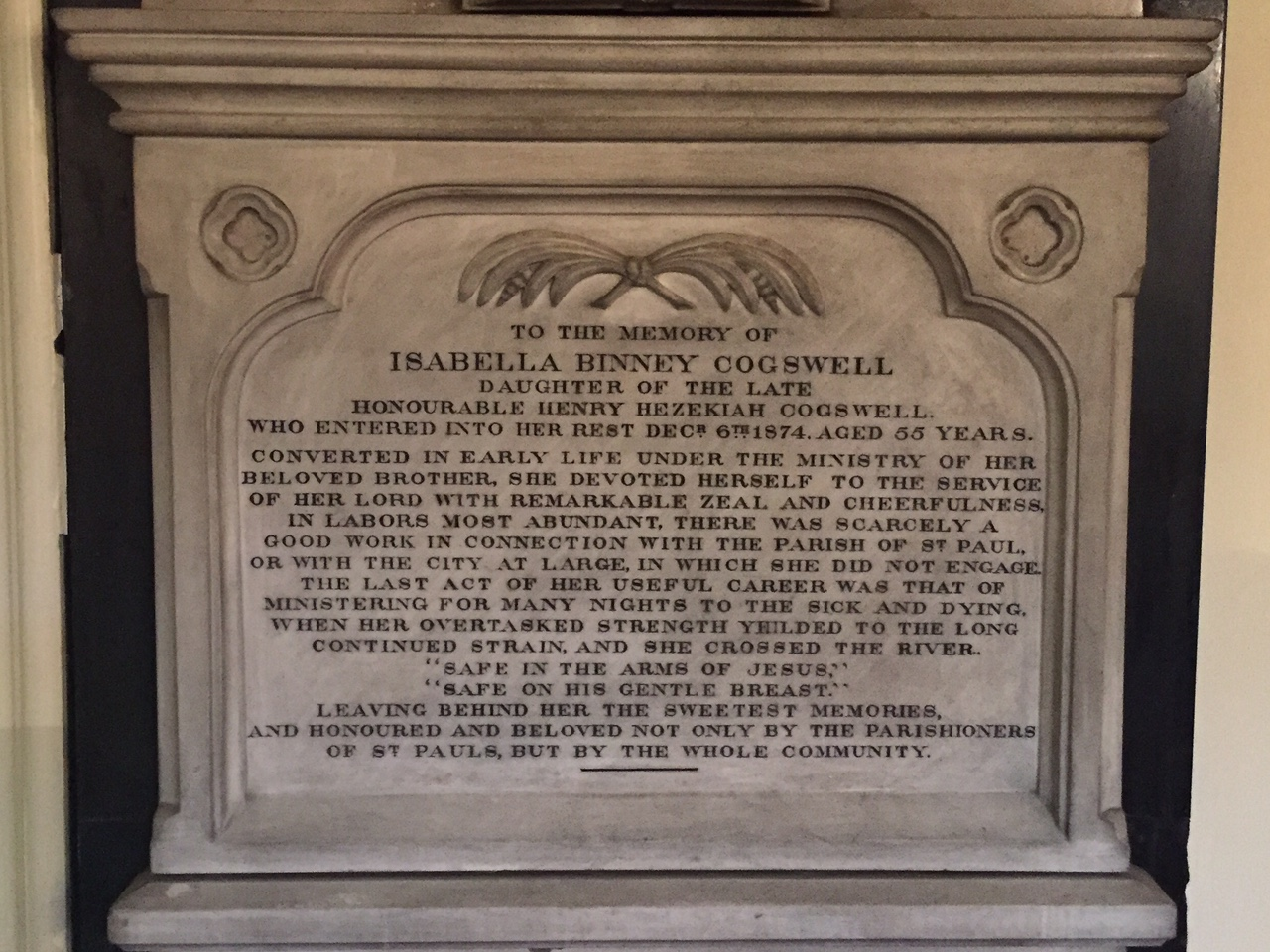
Isabella Binney Cogswell, St. Paul's Church

Isabella Cogswell (6 July 1819 – 6 December 1874) was a Canadian businesswoman. She was born in Halifax, a daughter to Henry Cogswell and Isabella Ellis.

Cogswell showed a business acumen that stood her in good stead in funding her philanthropic activities during her lifetime. A businesswoman, her business dealings helped fund a variety of causes within her native Nova Scotia. She is commemorated with a plaque in St. Paul's Church.
