= North British Society =

Club in Halifax

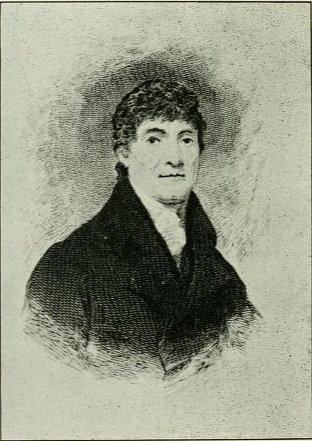
John Gillespie, 1st President of North British Society, buried at the Old Burying Ground

The North British Society (also known as "The Scots" and "Scots Club") was founded in Halifax, Nova Scotia in 1768, the oldest Scottish heritage society outside Great Britain. North British is an adjective used as an alternative to "Scottish".

== History ==
The Society was established "for the benefit of ourselves and assistance of each other, who may be afflicted with disease or any other casualty or misfortune." Since 1768, the Society has continued to support the Scottish community in Nova Scotia.

The Society met regularly at the Great Pontack (Halifax).

The Society likely commissioned the portrait of Prince Edward by William J. Weaver which now is in Province House (Nova Scotia) (1797). The Society raffled the portrait on the eve of the North British Society's local celebration of the St. Andrew's Day, when the patriotic sentiment was roused by the stunning news of Admiral Nelson's glorious naval victory over Napoleon in the Battle of the Nile.

The Society public activities include commissioning three works for Victoria Park, Halifax: the Robert Burns statue (1919), the Sir Walter Scott bust (1932), and the Sir William Alexander cairn (1957).

== Work commissioned ==
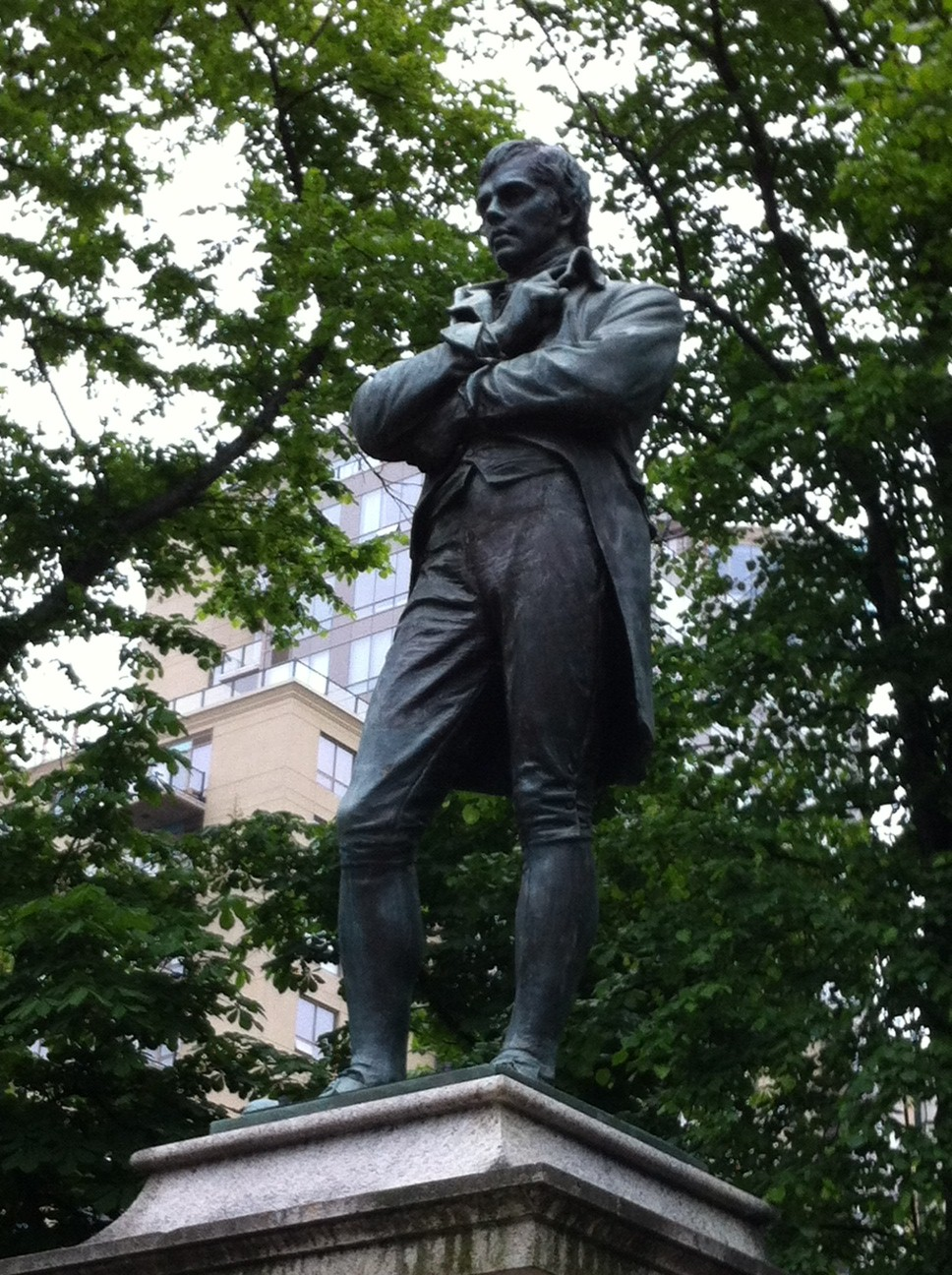
Robbie Burns by George A. Lawson (1919)

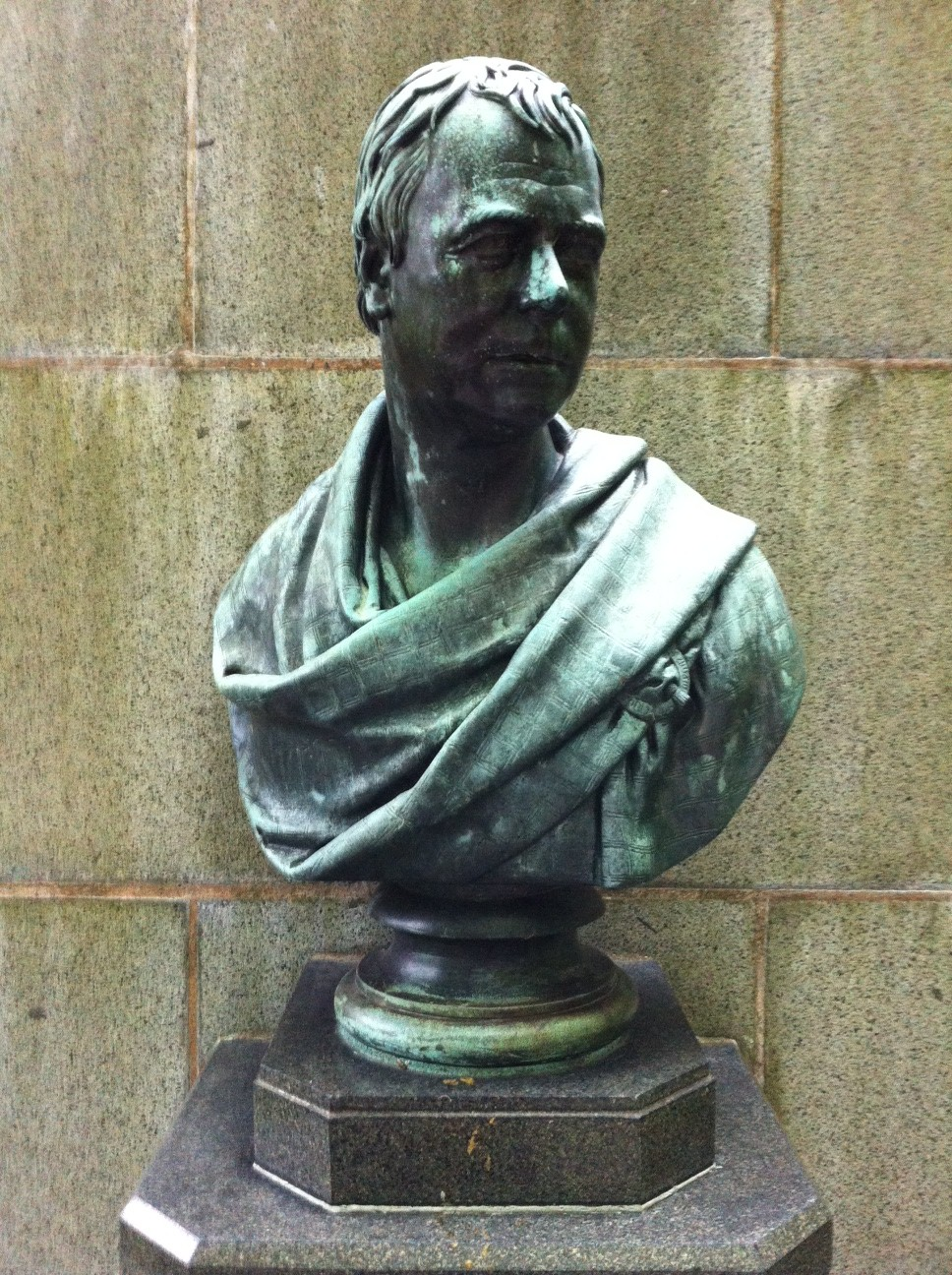
Sir Walter Scott by Sir Francis Chantrey (1932)

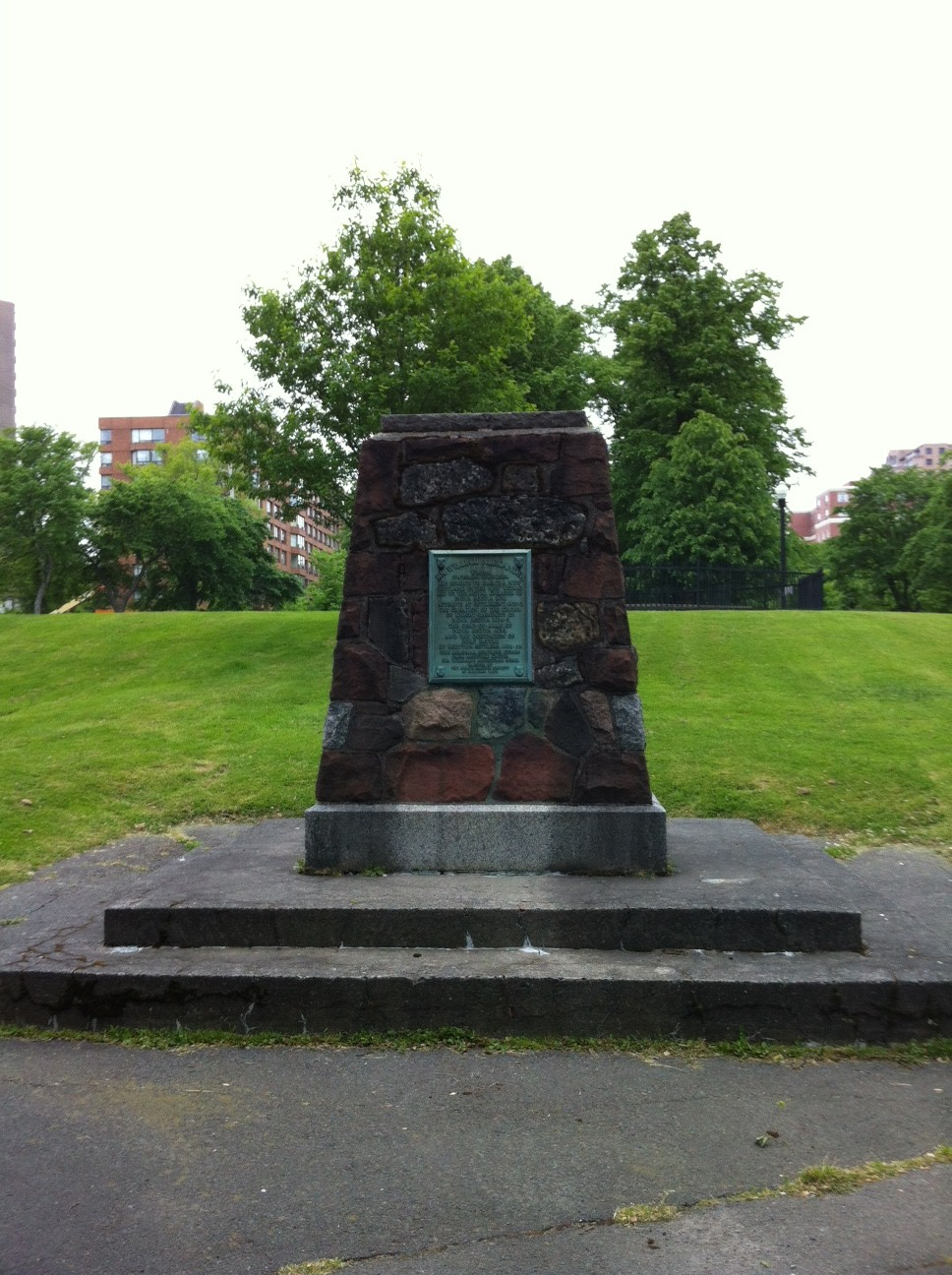
William Alexander Monument, built of stones from his Menstrie Castle (1957)

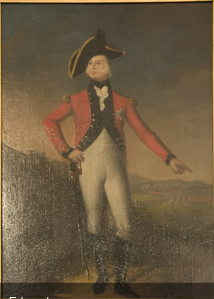
Prince Edward, Duke of Kent and Strathearn By William J. Weaver, Province House (Nova Scotia)

== Notable members ==
=== Political figure ===
- William Annand
- Sir William Young (Nova Scotia politician)
- George Henry Murray, longest serving Premier of Nova Scotia
- Charles James MacDonald

=== Doctor ===
- John Halliburton (surgeon)
- Duncan Clark (surgeon)

=== Legal Profession ===
- Judge Brenton Halliburton
- Robert Sedgewick (judge)
- Chief Justice Thomas Andrew Lumisden Strange

=== Merchant ===
- John Black (New Brunswick merchant)
- Alexander Keith (Canadian politician) and brewer
- James Fraser (businessman)
- John Esson
- Alexander Brymer
- William Bowie (merchant)
- William Murdoch (merchant)

=== Military officer ===
- James J. Bremner
- Andrew MacDonald (military officer), Rogart
- Henry Duncan (Royal Navy officer, born 1735)
- Patrick Leonard MacDougall

=== Other ===
- Archibald Gray (minister)
- Sandford Fleming
- Alexander Forrester (educationist)
- Sir Charles Frederick Fraser
- George Lang (builder)
- Andrew Brown (minister)
- Thomas Douglas, 5th Earl of Selkirk (1804)
- John Campbell, 9th Duke of Argyll

== See also ==
- Charitable Irish Society of Halifax
