= William Bowie (merchant) =

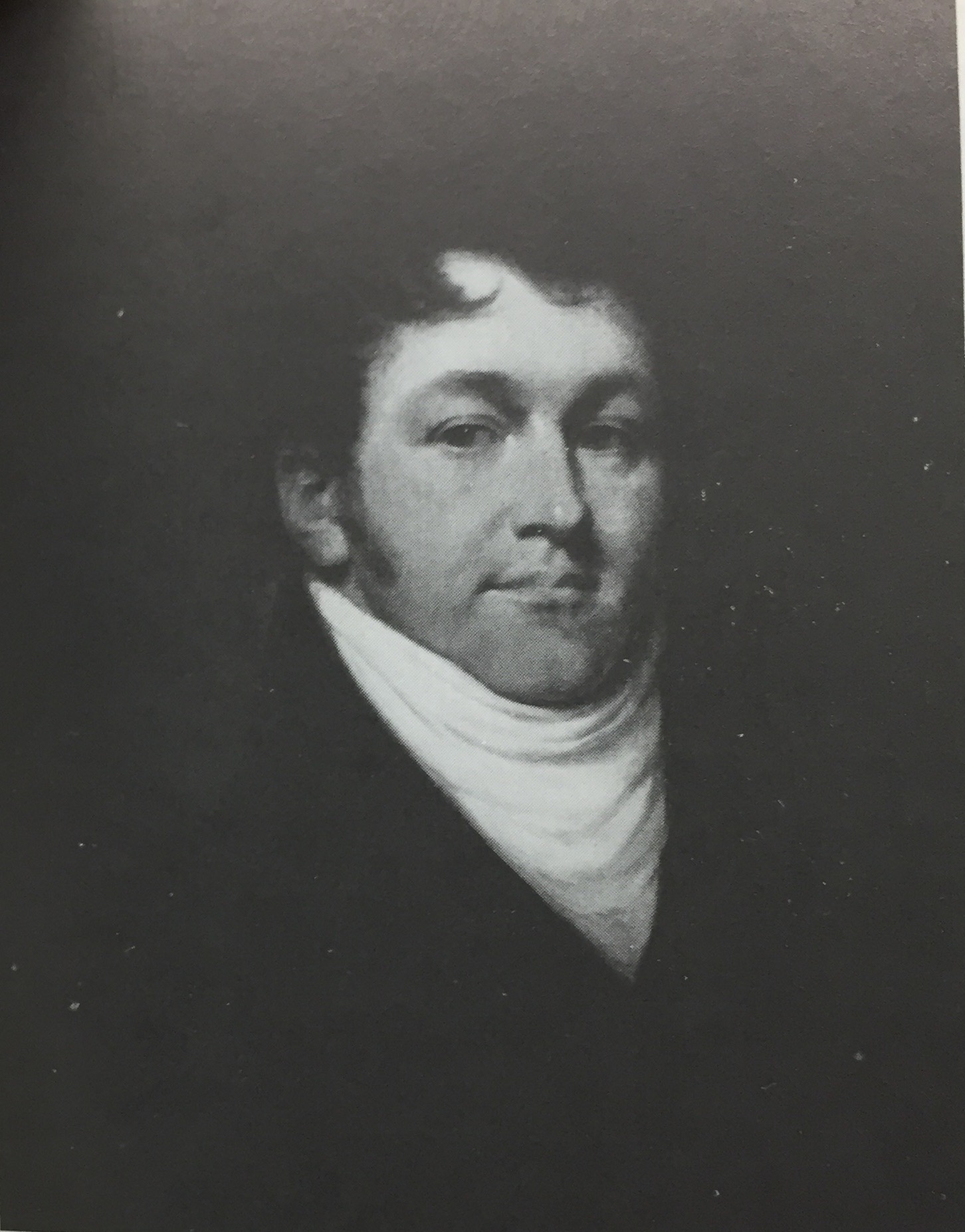
William Bowie, by Robert Field

William Bowie (1783-1819) was a prominent merchant of Halifax, Nova Scotia who was killed in the last fatal duel on record in Nova Scotia. He became president of the North British Society. Under the mentorship of Alexander Brymer, Bowie founded the firm Bowie & DeBlois and in a few years amassed a fortune and Bowie became a leading citizen in Halifax.

== Duel ==
During a supreme court case in July 1819, Bowie's opposing lawyer was Richard John Uniacke, Jr. They both made insulting remarks to each other and Uniacke challenged Bowie to a duel. William Bowie's name appears on a 1784 grant of land on today's Oak Island in Mahone Bay, along with several others. He owned lot #23 in 1784 and it is rumored that he built the slipway and storage facilities in Smith's Cove to offload the goods that privateers brought him. He and Uniacke met near the Narrows at 4:00 am on July 21. They marched twelve paces from each other. Then they fired two shots, after which Bowie was taken to a nearby barn where he died. He was age 36.

The duel and death of Bowie "shocked Halifax" and the flags of all the vessels in the harbour were hung at half mast. This was the first important trial to happen in the court at Province House. The grand jury trial proved to be "screaming farce." Such a trial would have normally been prosecuted by Uniacke's father Richard John Uniacke who was the attorney general; however, he declined. The drama of the trial was captured by the Acadian Recorder:

... about 20 minutes past 11 o'clock, the Hon. Richard John Uniacke entered the Court, supporting his son on his right arm... He advanced to the Bench and stated to the Court, under feeling which evidently almost overpowered him, that he had an important and melancholy duty to perform that whatever his feelings might be upon the occasion, they must be subservient to the laws of the land, which he did not doubt would be administered with justice and mercy."

Uniacke's only defense was his honour and the honour of his family and, as expected, he was found not guilty.

== Gallery ==
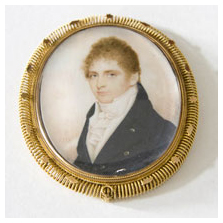
Richard John Uniacke, Jr.- Killed Bowie

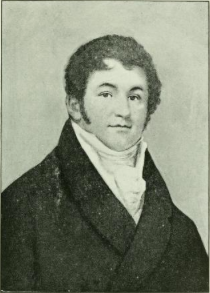
William Bowie, Halifax, Nova Scotia

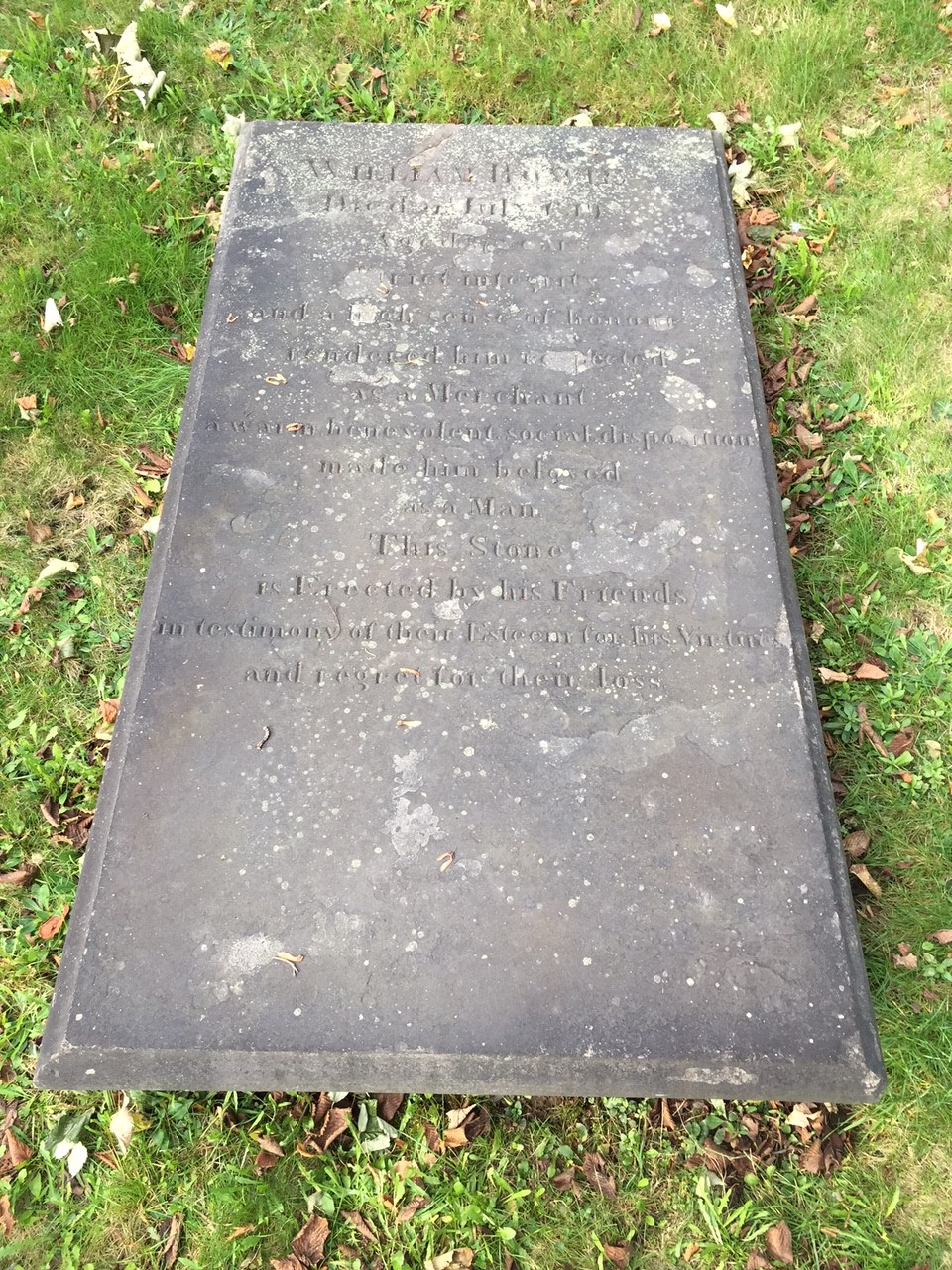
William Bowie, Old Burying Ground (Halifax, Nova Scotia)
