= The Carleton =

Building in Halifax, Nova Scotia, Canada

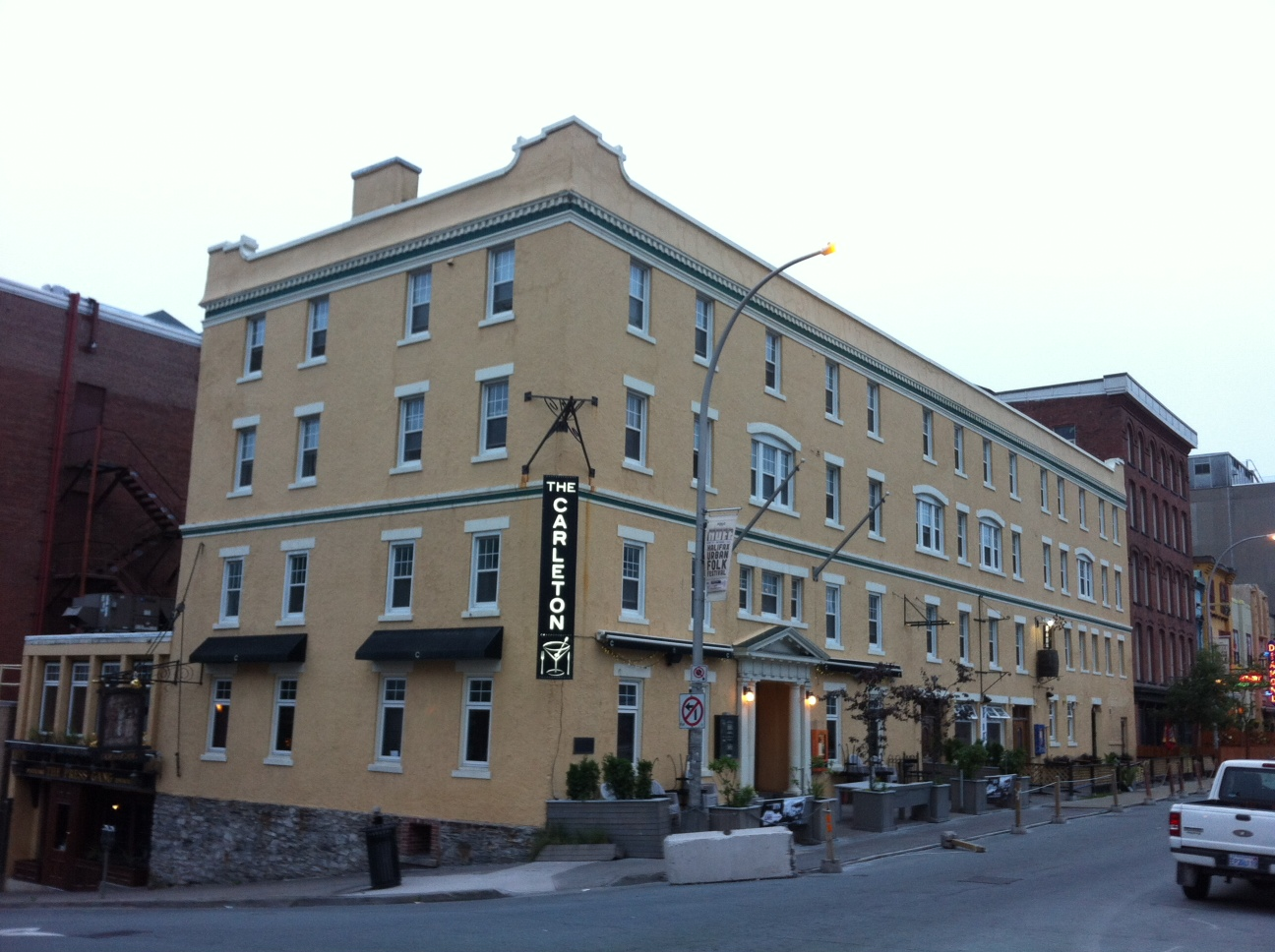
The Carleton, Halifax, Nova Scotia

The Carleton (also known as the Carleton House and Carleton Hotel) is a building on Argyle Street in Halifax, Nova Scotia, built in 1760 as the home of Richard Bulkeley. Apart from two churches, Bulkeley's home is the oldest building in Halifax, Nova Scotia (1760). It was reported to have been made from the ruins of Fortress Louisbourg. Since 1786 his residence has been known as "The Carleton".

== History ==
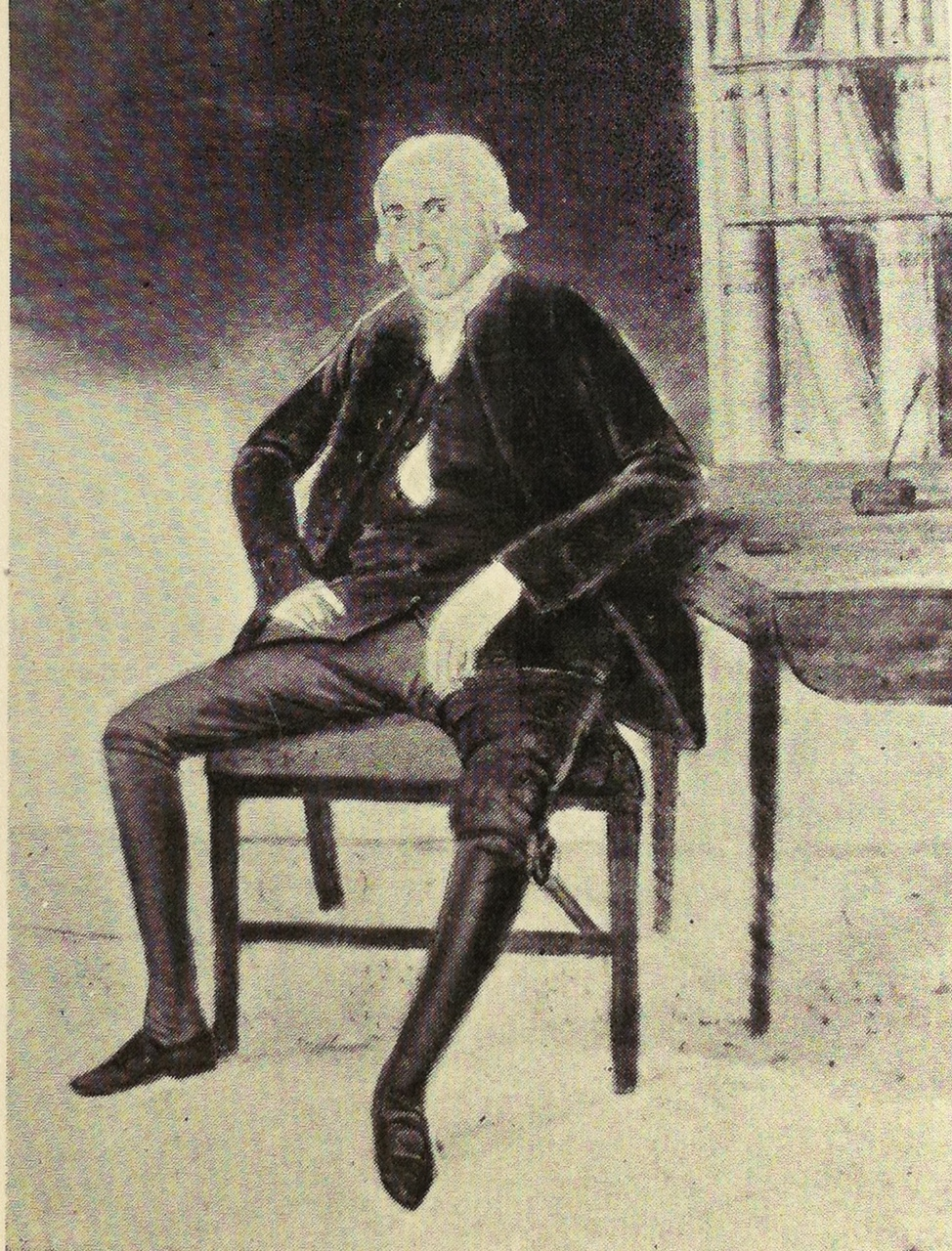
Richard Bulkleley

Bulkeley built his new home on Argyle Street on the land of Captain James Bannerman, who died during Father Le Loutre's War in the Attack at Jeddore. He also had installed the black marble mantel from the Governor's house in the King's Bastion at Louisbourg. He is also reported to have brought the stone from the ruins of Louisbourg (1758) to build the house. At his new home in the 1780s, Bulkeley regularly entertained the future King William IV (abolished slavery in British Empire; had an affair with Governor Wentworth's wife Francis) as well as Prince Edward (father of Queen Victoria). He also held large levees there on New Year's Day and the queen's birthday, as well as dinners on St Patrick's and St George's days."

He named his home Carleton House after Guy Carleton, 1st Baron Dorchester upon his visit to Halifax in 1786 and becoming governor general for the whole of British North America. (Carleton ordered the creation of the Book of Negroes and oversaw the evacuation of escaped slaves (i.e., Black Loyalists) from New York to Nova Scotia.)

Bulkeley's widow eventually sold the residence to Henry Hezekiah Cogswell (1816).

== Guests and patrons ==
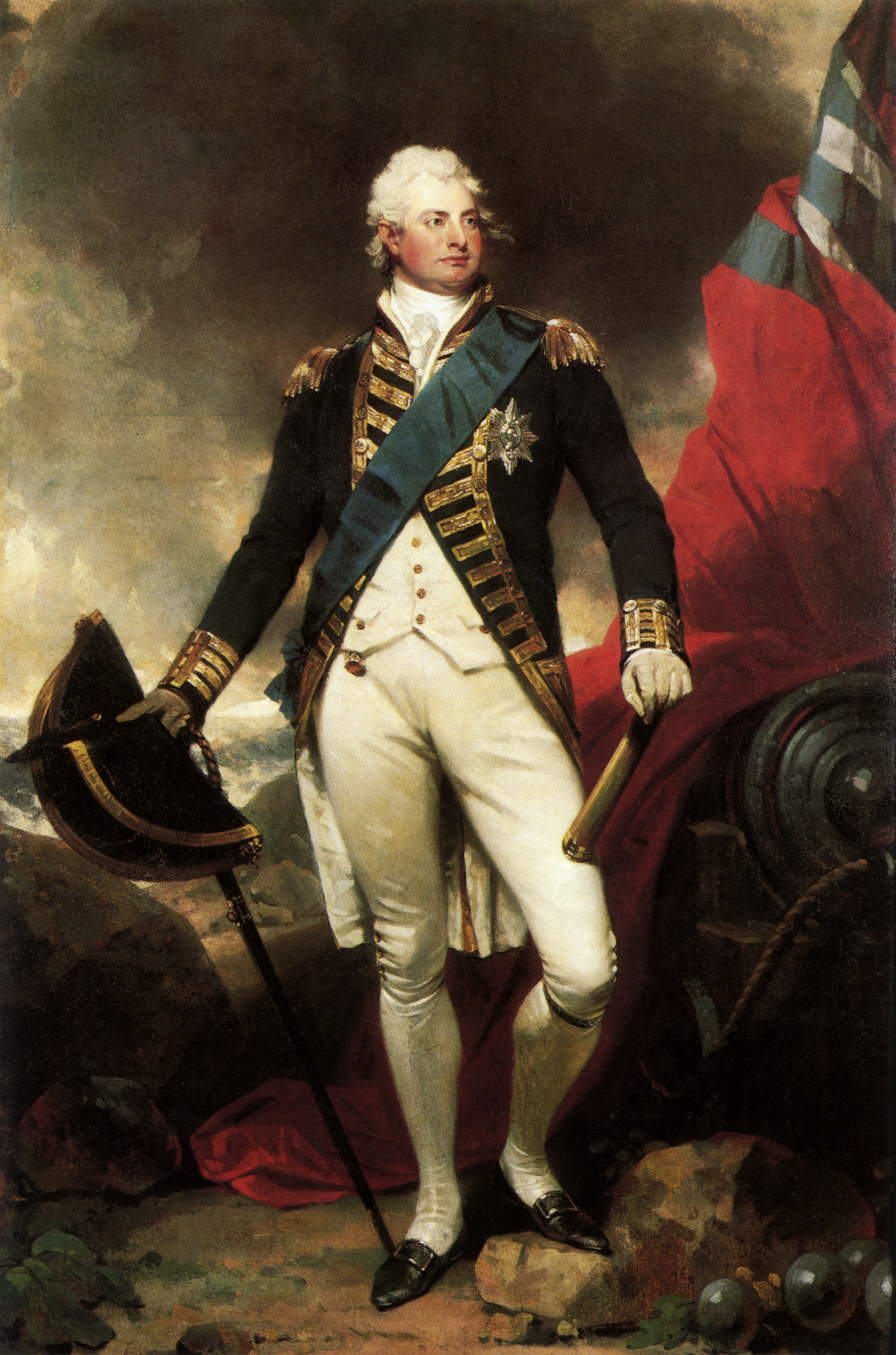
King William IV

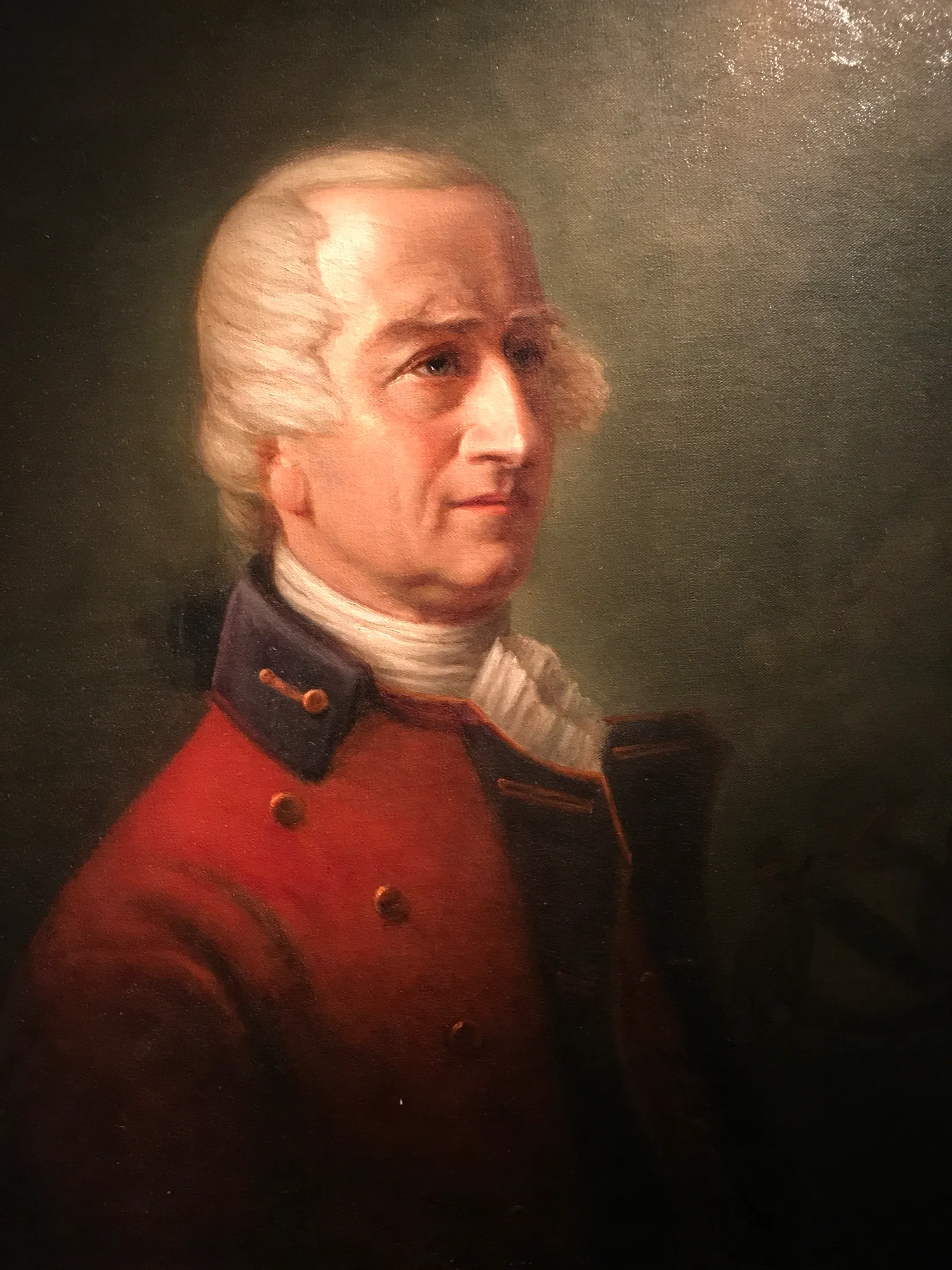
Guy Carleton, 1st Baron Dorchester

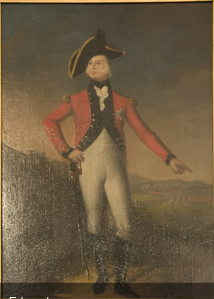
Prince Edward

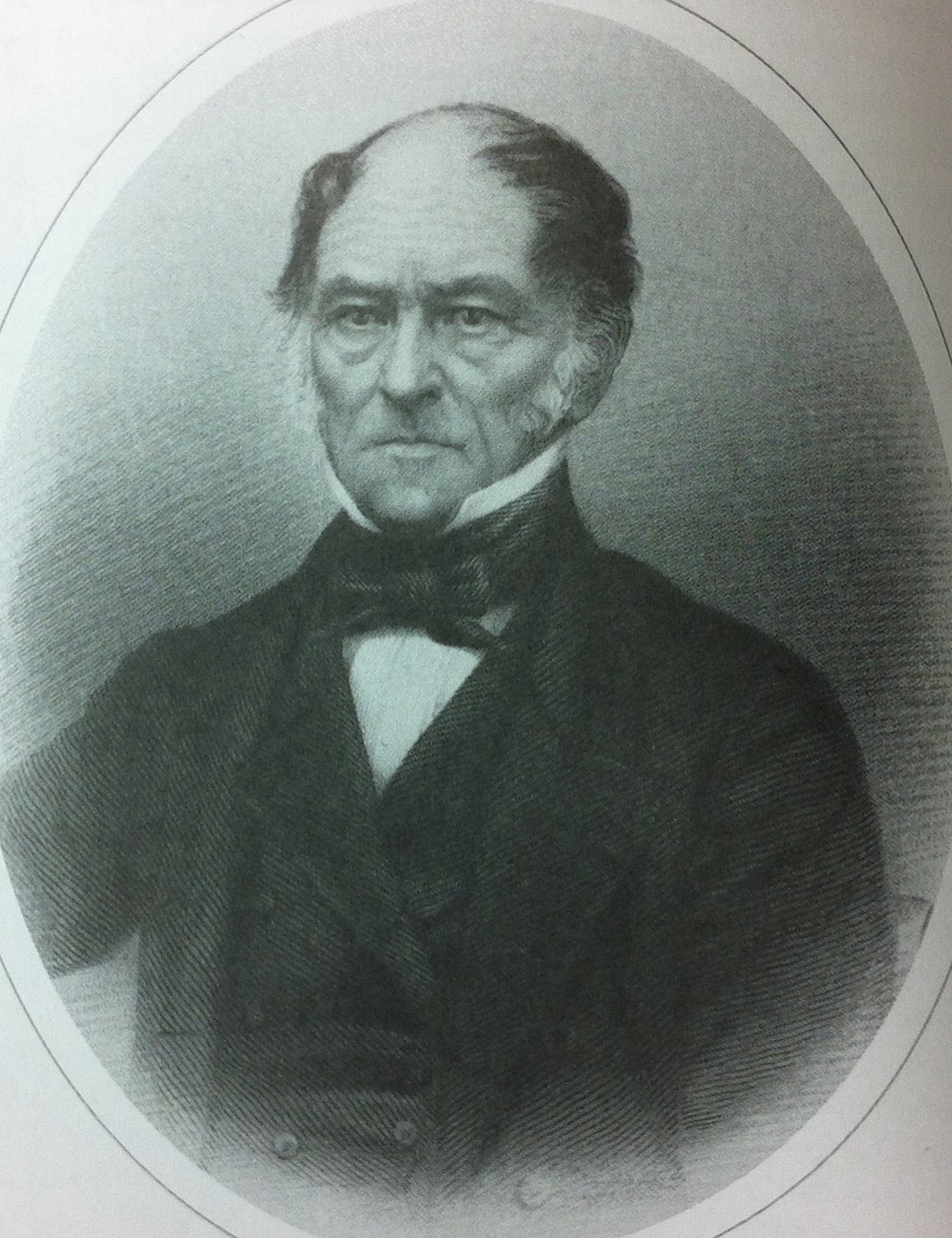
Henry Hezekiah Cogswell

== In popular culture ==
The Carleton is featured in "A Murder at Carleton House" by Chris Patrick Carolan. In this alternate history story set in 1881, the Carleton is home to a fictional gentlemen's club. The story is the first published appearance of paranormal detective Isaac Barrow.

== See also ==
- List of oldest buildings and structures in Halifax, Nova Scotia
- History of the Halifax Regional Municipality
- Great Pontack (Halifax)
