= Duncan Clark (surgeon) =

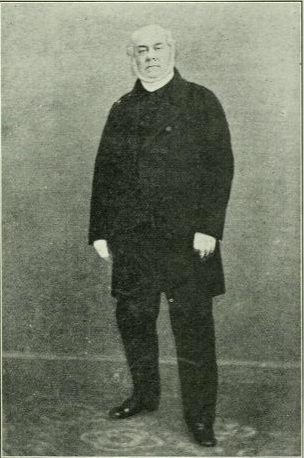
Duncan Clark (1759-1808)

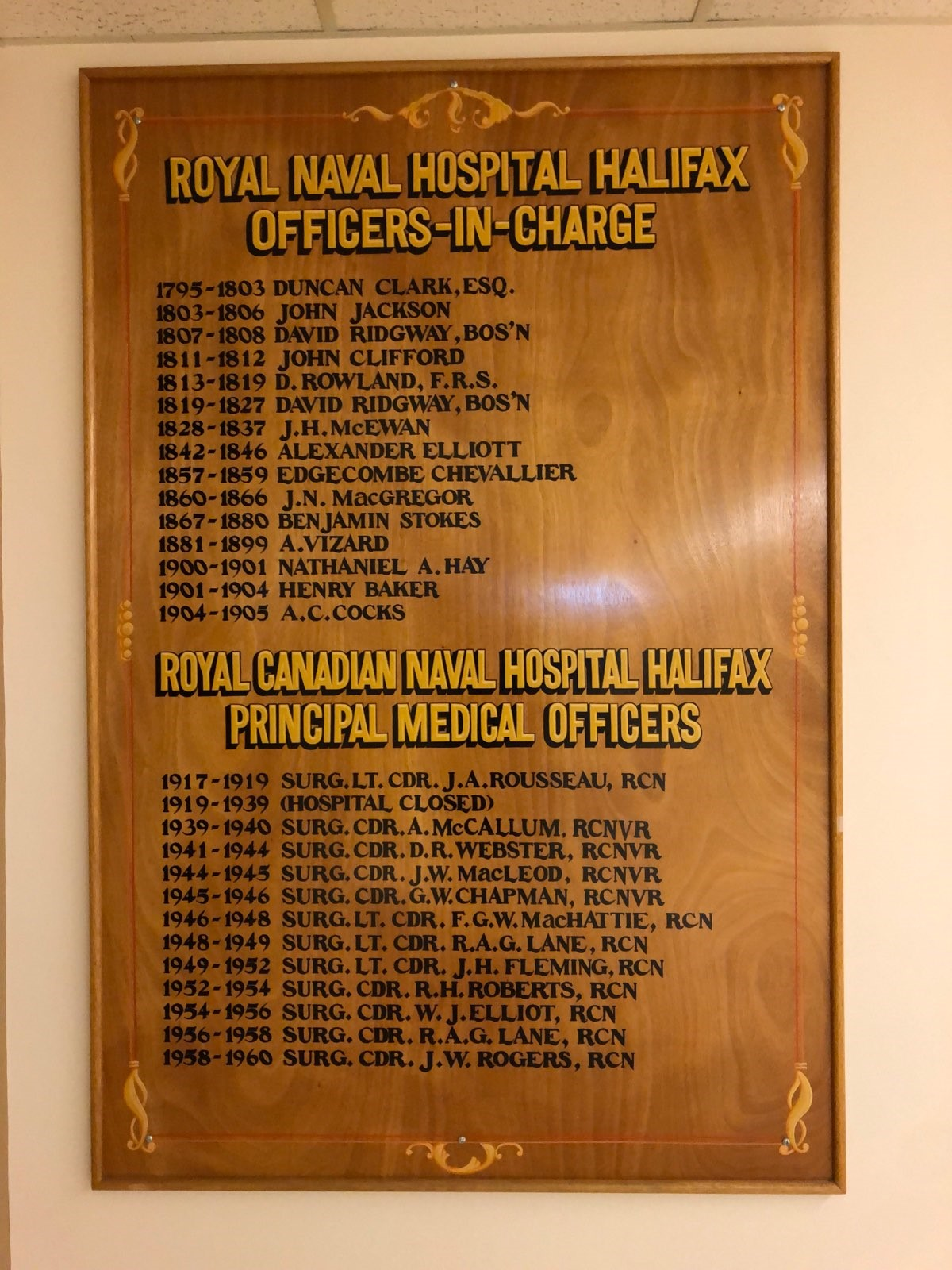
Dr. Duncan Clarke, First head of Royal Naval Hospital Halifax, Plaque to commemorate Officers-in-Charge, Health Centre, CFB Halifax, Nova Scotia

Duncan Clark (1759-1808) was a Loyalist who became an influential figure in Halifax, Nova Scotia. Duncan Clarke, first and one of the longest serving head of Royal Naval Hospital Halifax (1795-1803). He served in the 82nd Regiment of Foot and arrived in Halifax in 1778. He was a member of the North British Society, eventually becoming president. He was a frequent patron of the Great Pontack (Halifax). Clark also was the head of a Masonic Lodge for Saint John, New Brunswick and later in Nova Scotia. He was also a friend of John Halliburton (surgeon) of the doctor for Prince Edward, Duke of Kent and Strathearn.
