= John Halliburton (surgeon) =

Canadian surgeon

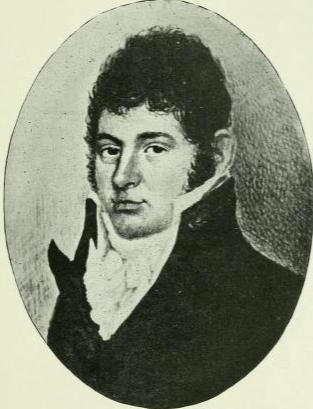
John Halliburton (1725–1808)

John Halliburton (1725–1808) was a surgeon and a Loyalist who settled in Nova Scotia. He was a member of the North British Society. He is the father of Chief Justice Brenton Halliburton and, in turn, the grandfather of John C. Halliburton (who fought a duel with Joseph Howe to protect his father's honour). He is buried in the Old Burying Ground (Halifax, Nova Scotia). Halliburton was elected a Fellow of the American Academy of Arts and Sciences in 1797. He was a close friend of Dr. Duncan Clark and shared the responsibility for the medical care of the Duke of Kent. He built his home the Bower, that still stands in Halifax.

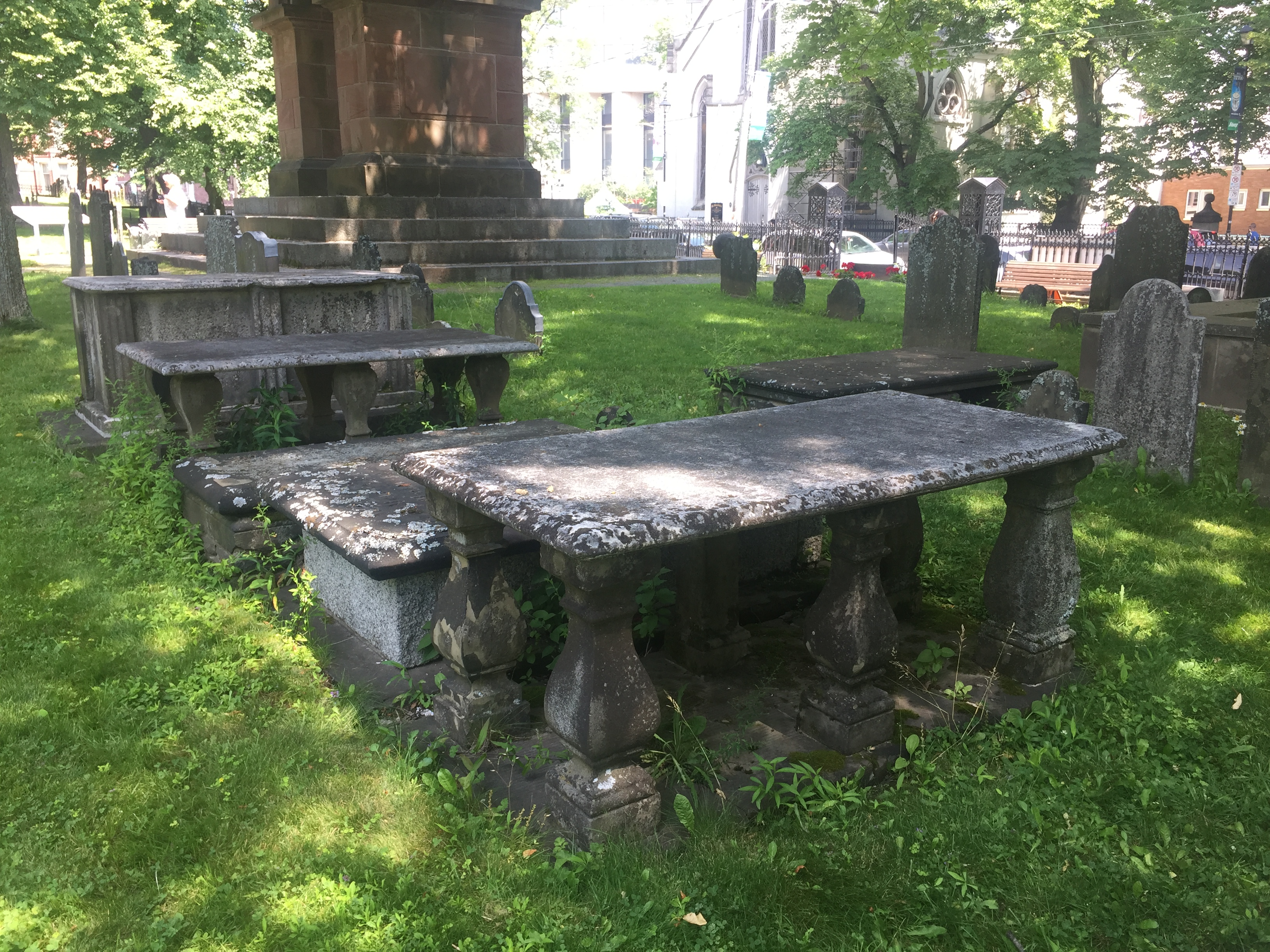
John Halliburton, Old Burying Ground, Halifax, Nova Scotia

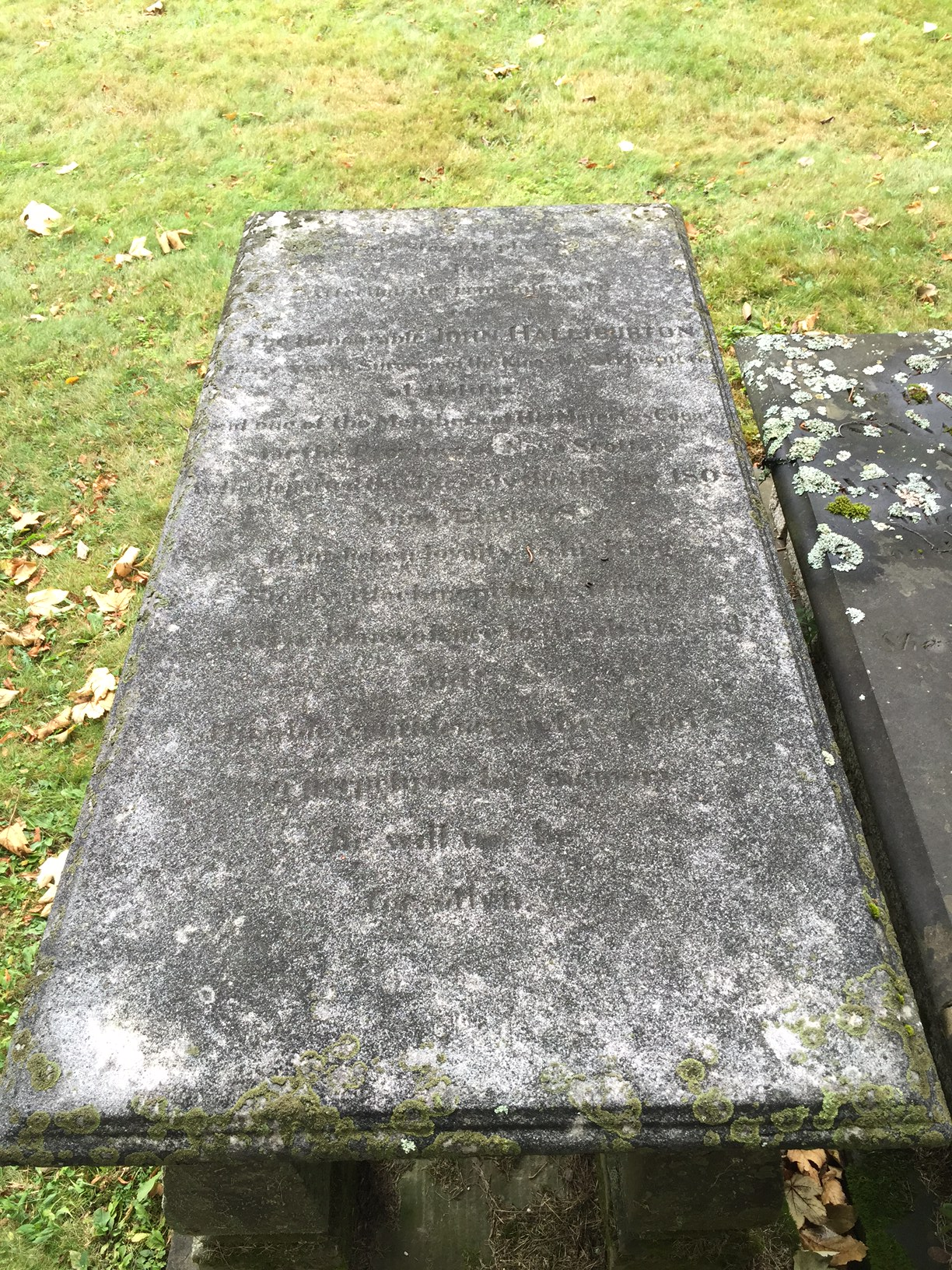
John Haliburton, Old Burying Ground (Halifax, Nova Scotia)

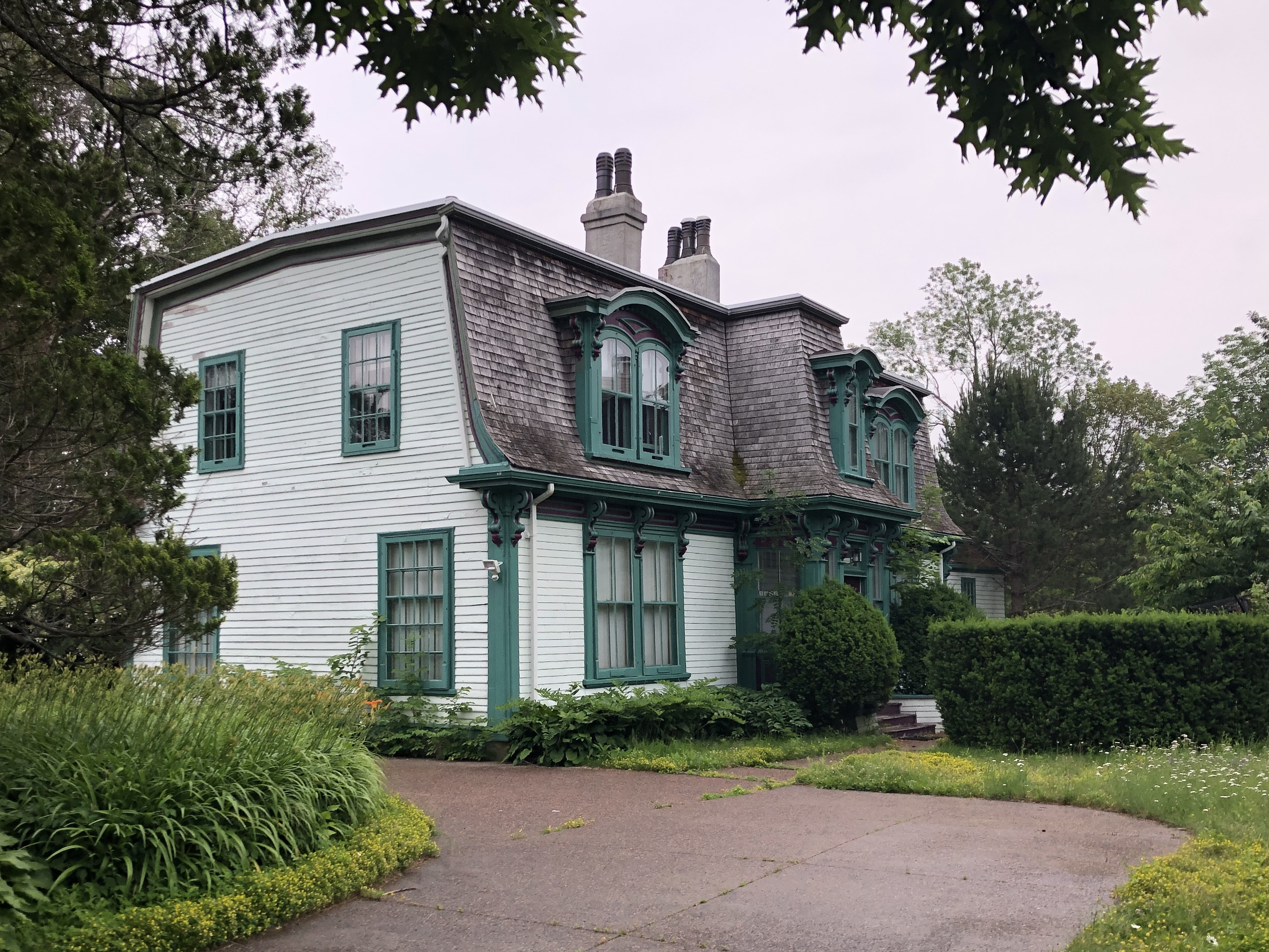
The Bowery, Halifax, Nova Scotia
