= Alexander Brymer =

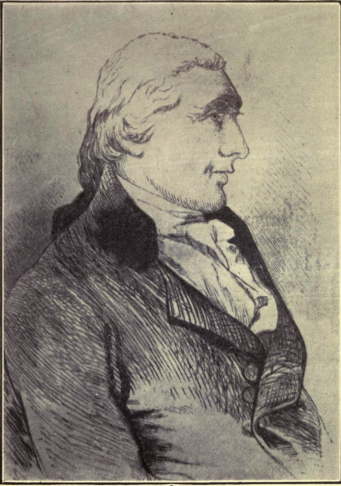
Alexander Brymer

Alexander Brymer (c.1745–27 August 1822) was a Scottish-born merchant who was influential in Halifax, Nova Scotia, Canada. He was a member of the North British Society and a mentor to fellow merchant, William Bowie. He was appointed to the Nova Scotia Council in 1782, serving until he left for England in 1801. He died 27 August 1822 in Ramsgate, England.
