= Henry Hezekiah Cogswell =

Canadian politician (1776–1854)

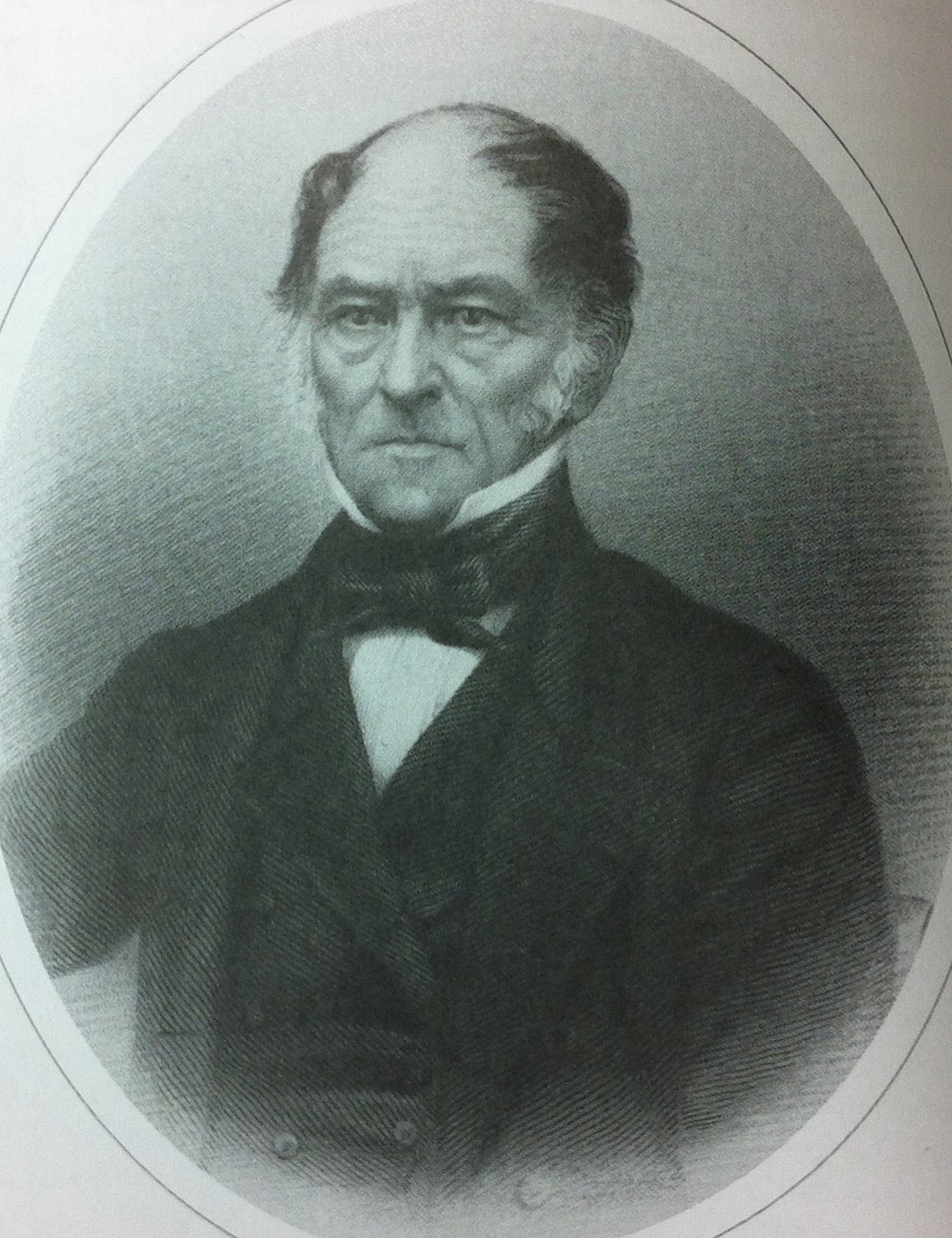

Henry Hezekiah Cogswell (April 12, 1776 – November 9, 1854) was a lawyer, political figure and philanthropist in Nova Scotia. He represented the town of Halifax in the Nova Scotia House of Assembly from 1818 to 1820. He was president of the Royal Acadian School.

== Biography ==
He was born on April 12, 1776, in Cornwallis Township, to Mason Cogswell and Lydia Huntington, and was educated at King's College. He studied law with Richard John Uniacke and was called to the bar in 1798, setting up practice in Halifax. In 1805, Cogswell married Isabella Ellis. He was named deputy provincial secretary in 1812 and, in 1818, Registrar of the Court of Chancery. In 1816, he purchased The Carleton.

With Martin Gay Black and others, he helped establish the Halifax Banking Company in 1825, serving as the first president for the bank. In 1831, Cogswell was named to the province's Council. He also served as commissioner of the vice admiralty court and president of the Halifax Board of Health. Cogswell was president of the Albion Fire and Life Insurance Company and of the Annapolis Iron Mining Company. An obvious target for political reformers, he lost most of his political appointments by 1841. Cogswell helped support the Halifax Mechanics' Institute, was a generous supporter of King's College, and contributed to Halifax charities. In his later years, he lobbied for a railway link between Halifax and Quebec City. He died at Halifax at the age of 78.

His daughter Isabella Binney Cogswell went on to become a prominent philanthropist, and his son James Colquhoun Cogswell later served as president of the Halifax Banking Company. His son William Cogswell became a highly respected author and minister in the Anglican Church.

== Legacy ==
- Namesake of Cogswell Street, Halifax

== Gallery ==
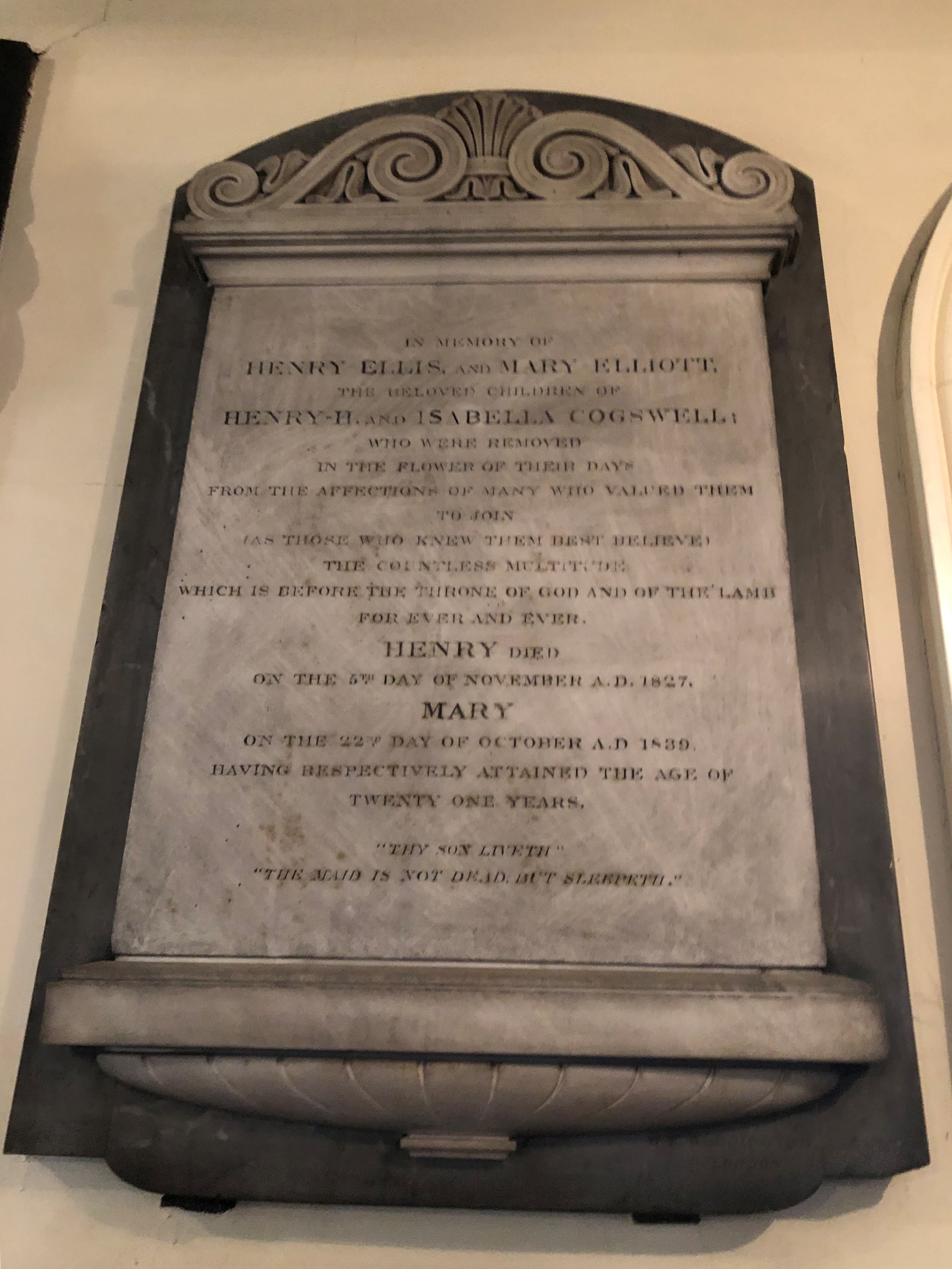
Henry H. Cogswell children's monument by William F. Woodington, St. Paul's Church, Halifax, Nova Scotia

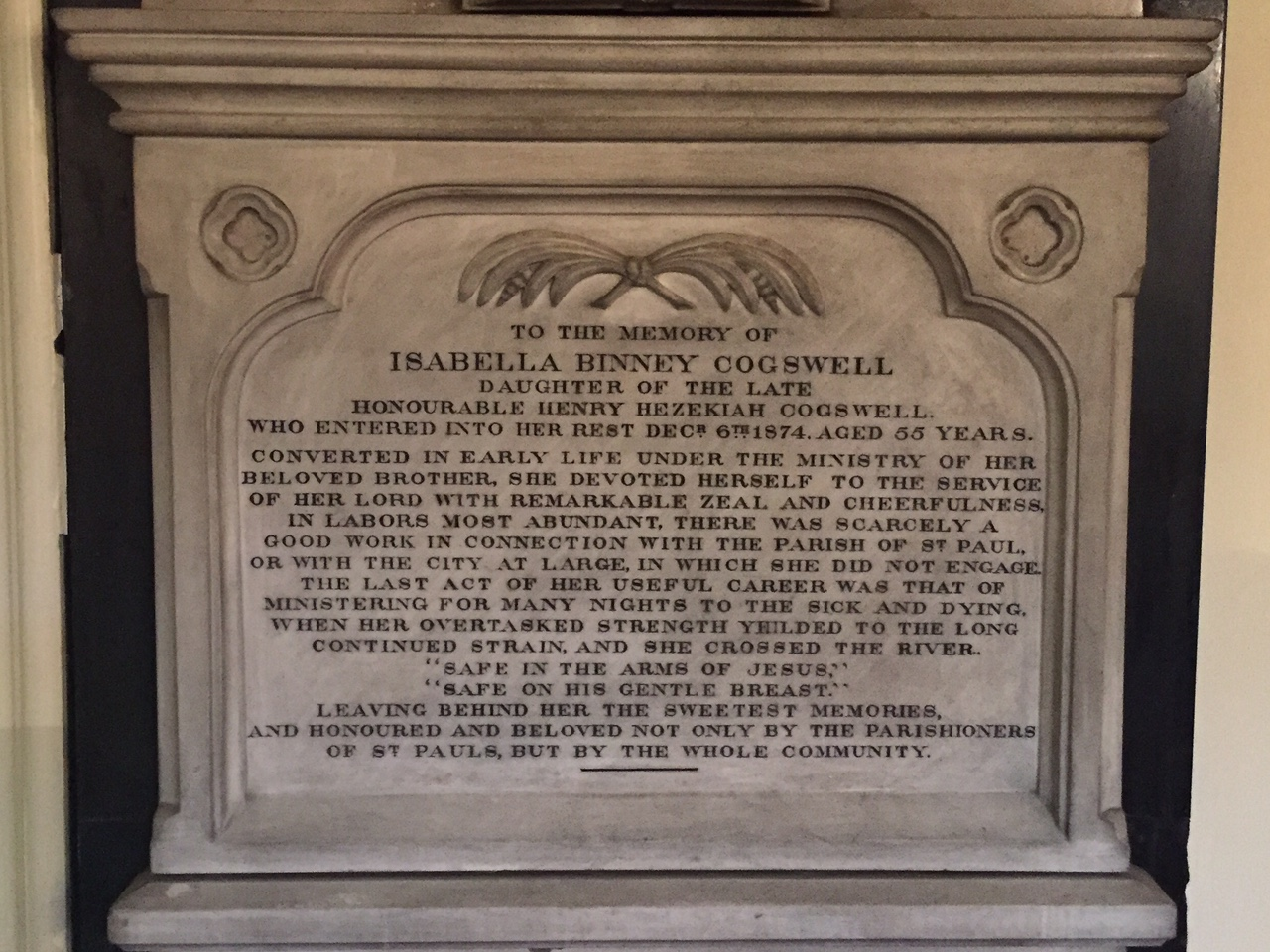
Cogswell monument to his daughter Isabella Binney Cogswell, St. Paul's Church (Halifax)

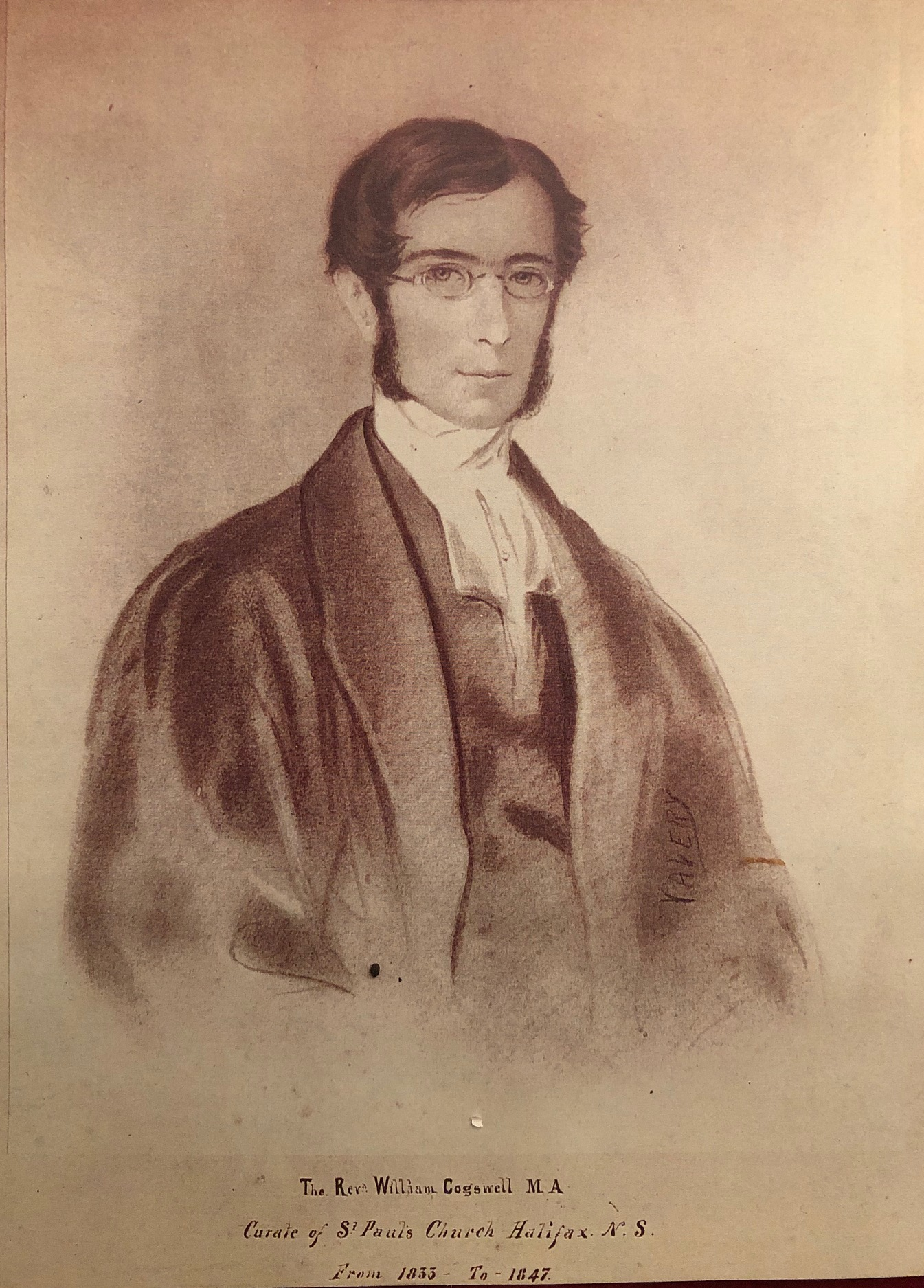
Rev. William Cogswell, St. Paul's Church, Halifax, Nova Scotia

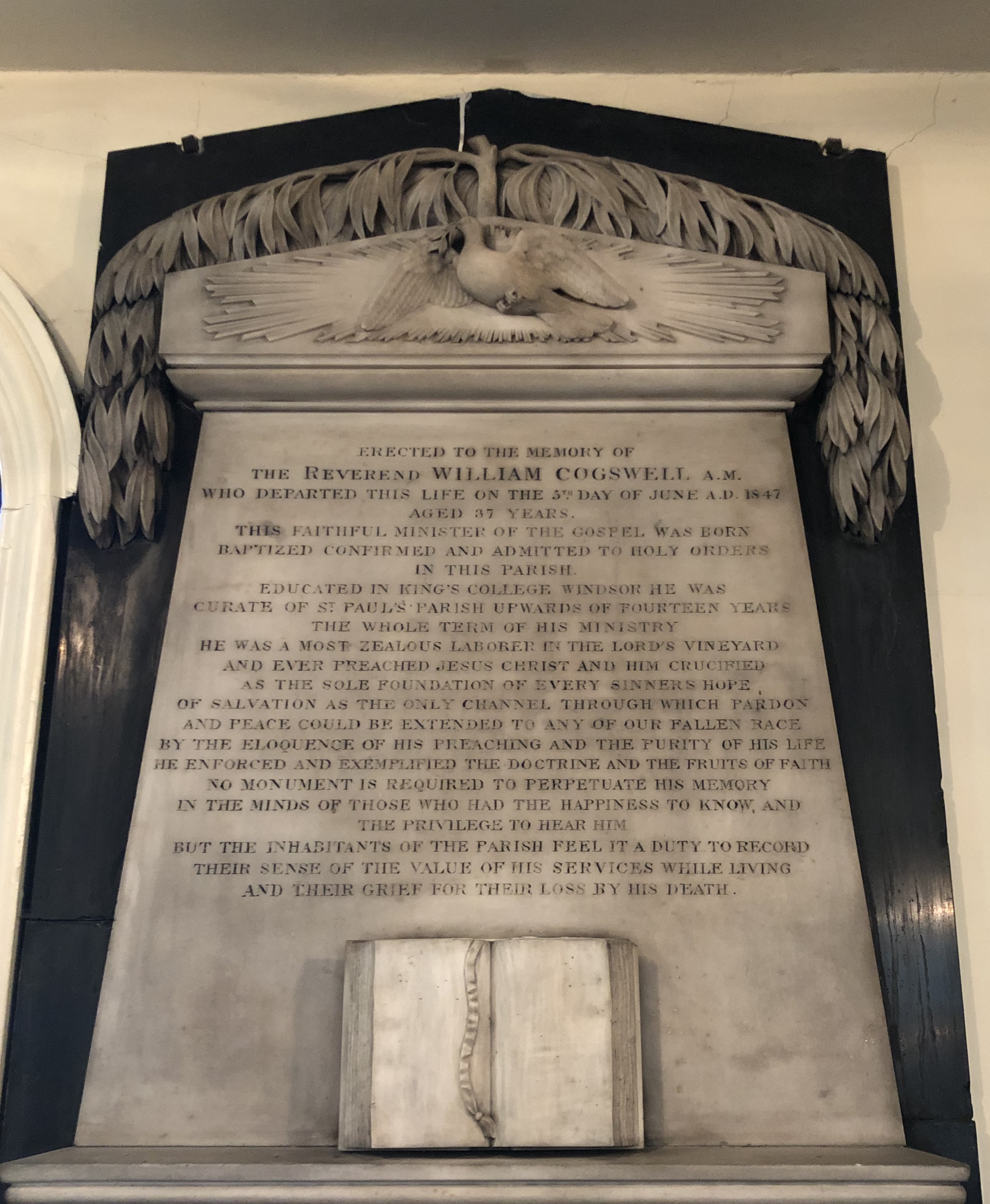
Rev. William Cogswell Monument, St. Paul's Church, Halifax, Nova Scotia

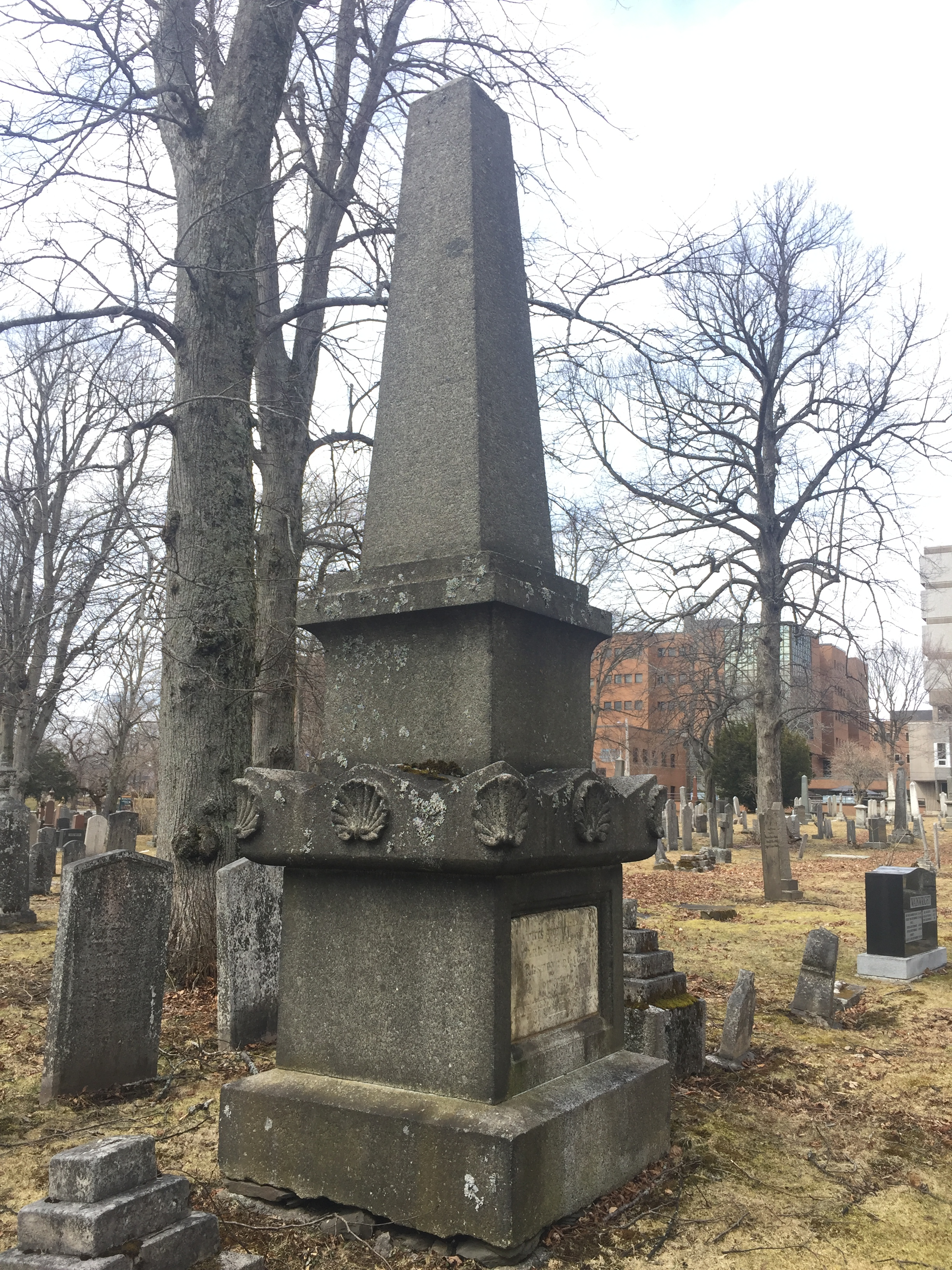
Henry Hezekiah Cogswell, Camp Hill Cemetery, Halifax, Nova Scotia
