= Old Burying Ground (Halifax, Nova Scotia) =

Cemetery in Halifax, Nova Scotia, Canada

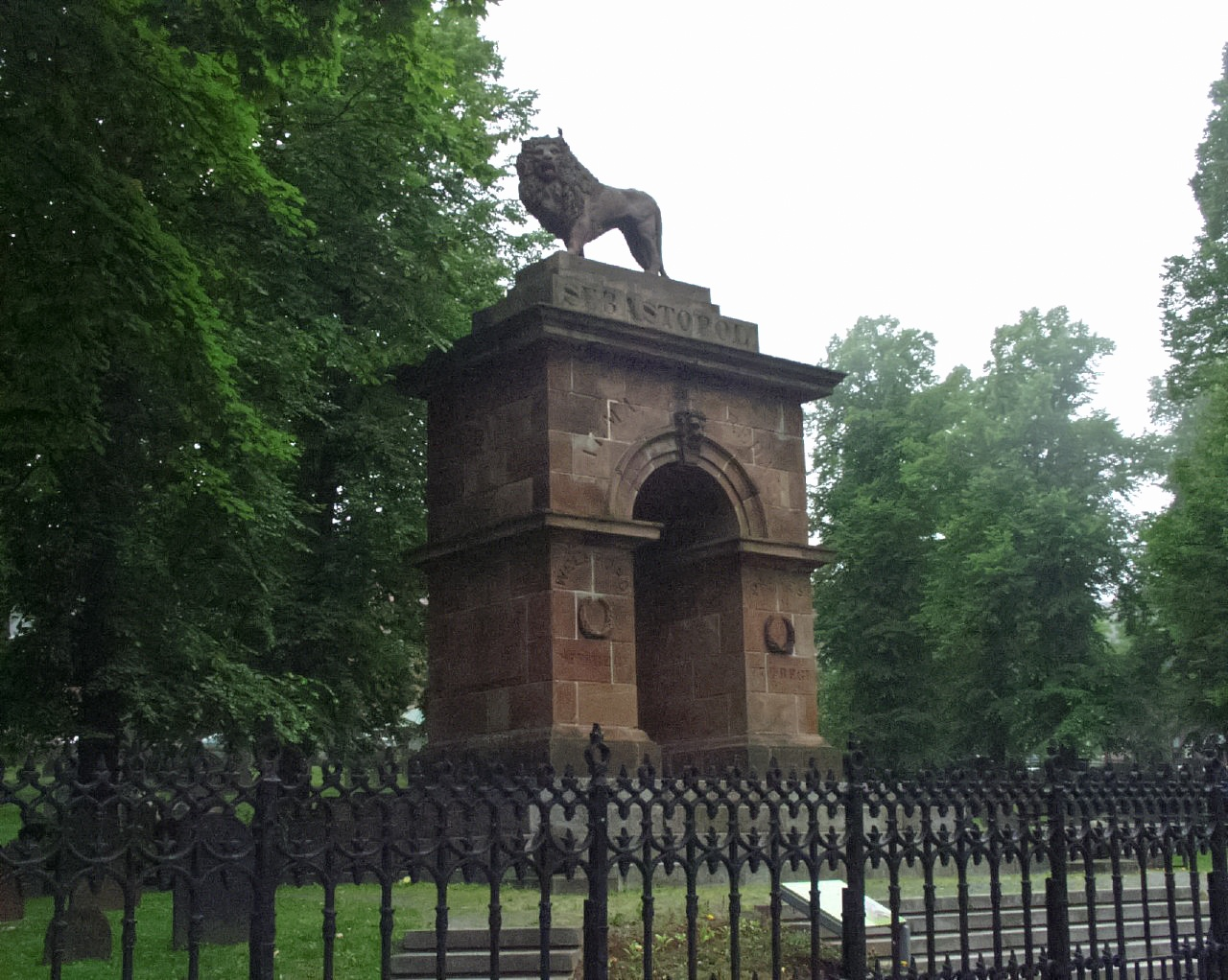
- Triumphal arch – Crimean War
- Interactive map of Old Burying Ground

Details
- Established: 1749
- Location: Halifax, Nova Scotia
- Country: Canada
- Coordinates: 44.6434°N 63.5728°W
- Type: Closed
- Owned by: St. Paul's Church (Halifax)
- No. of graves: 12,000+

National Historic Site of Canada
- Official name: Old Burying Ground National Historic Site of Canada
- Designated: 1991

Nova Scotia Heritage Property Act
- Type: Provincially Registered Property
- Designated: 1988

The Old Burying Ground (also known as St. Paul's Church Cemetery) is a historic cemetery in Halifax, Nova Scotia, Canada. It is located at the intersection of Barrington Street and Spring Garden Road in Downtown Halifax.

== History ==
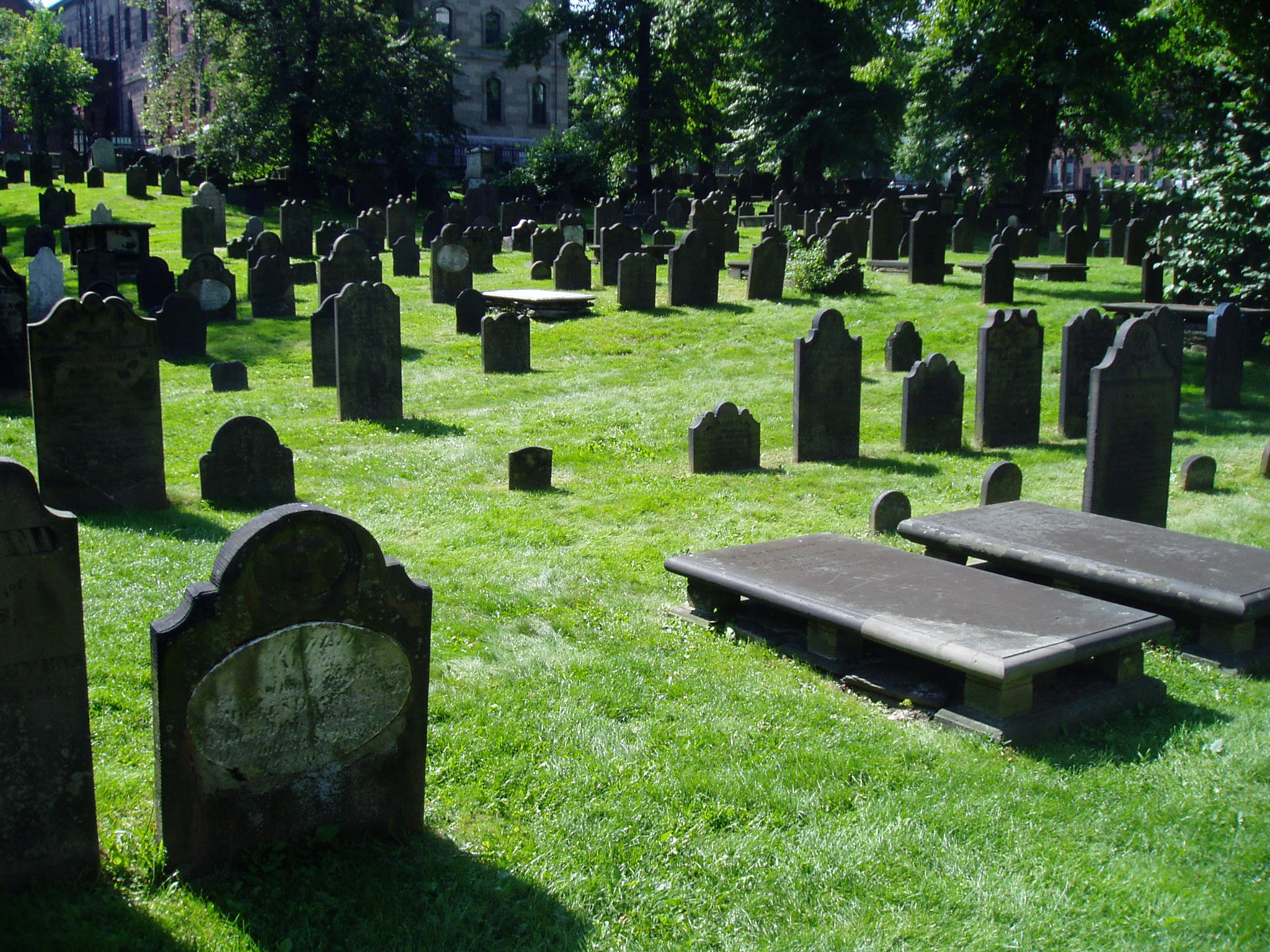
Old Burying Ground

The Old Burying Ground was founded in 1749, the same year as the settlement, as the town's first burial ground. It was originally non-denominational and for several decades was the only burial place for all Haligonians. (The burial ground was also used by St. Matthew's United Church). In 1793 it was turned over to the Anglican St. Paul's Church. The cemetery was closed in 1844 and the Camp Hill Cemetery established for subsequent burials. The site steadily declined until the 1980s when it was restored and refurbished by the Old Burying Ground Foundation, which now maintains the site and employ tour guides to interpret the site in the summer. Ongoing restoration of the rare 18th-century grave markers continues.

Over the decades some 12,000 people were interred in the Old Burial Ground. Today there are about 1,200 headstones, some having been lost and many others being buried with no headstone. Many notable residents are buried in the cemetery, including British Major General Robert Ross, who led the successful Washington Raid of 1814 and burned the White House before being killed in battle at Baltimore a few days later.

Commanders of three of the ships that served Governor Edward Cornwallis buried crew in unmarked graves: HMS Sphynx (1 crew), HMS Baltimore (1 crew) and HMS Albany (6 crew). HMS Sphynx was Cornwallis' own ship and the crew member was buried on the day his ship arrived in Halifax on 21 June 1749. HMS Albany was a 14-gun sloop commanded by Nova Scotia's senior naval officer, John Rous (1749–1753).

There are four recorded Mi'kmaq buried in the burial ground, including a Mi'kmaw Chief Francis [Muis]. There was also a "protestant indian" named John Tray, possibly from John Gorham's rangers.

There are also 167 recorded Black people buried in the graveyard, all with unmarked graves. (There is a grave marker, however, of the Huntingdonian Missionary who taught at the first school for Black students in Halifax, Reverend William Furmage.) Black people arrived with New England Planters. During the arrival of the Planters, there were 54 Black people in Halifax. 7 were buried in the cemetery from 1763 to 1775. Black Nova Scotians also arrived in Halifax with Boston Loyalists after the evacuation of Boston in 1776. During this period, 18 Black people were buried in the cemetery (1776–1782). Seventy-three free Black immigrants (and no slaves) also arrived in Halifax with the New York Loyalists after evacuation from New York in 1783. Of the 73 who arrived from New York, there were 4 burials that happened during this time period. Rev. John Breynton reported that in 1783 he baptized 40 Black people and buried many because of disease. Between the years 1792–1817 there are no recorded burials of Black Nova Scotians. The largest number of burials happen in the 1820s (72 graves), presumably the graves of the 155 Black Refugees who arrived in Halifax during the War of 1812.

The last erected and most prominent burial marker is the Welsford-Parker Monument, a Triumphal arch standing at the entrance to the cemetery commemorating British victory in the Crimean War. This is the first public monument built in Nova Scotia and is the fourth oldest war monument in Canada. It is also the only monument to the Crimean War in North America. The arch was built in 1860, 16 years after the cemetery had officially closed. The arch was built by George Lang and is named after two Haligonians, Major Augustus Frederick Welsford and Captain William Buck Carthew Augustus Parker. Both Nova Scotians died in the Battle of the Great Redan during the Siege of Sevastopol (1854–1855). This monument was the last grave marker in the cemetery.

In 1938, the Grand Lodge of Massachusetts presented and dedicated a granite monument to Erasmus James Philipps, who is the earliest known settler of Nova Scotia (c. 1721) to be buried in the cemetery. He was also the founder of Freemasonry in present-day Canada (1737).

The Old Burying Ground was designated a National Historic Site of Canada in 1991. It had earlier been designated a Provincially Registered Property in 1988 under Nova Scotia's Heritage Property Act.

== Prominent tombstones ==
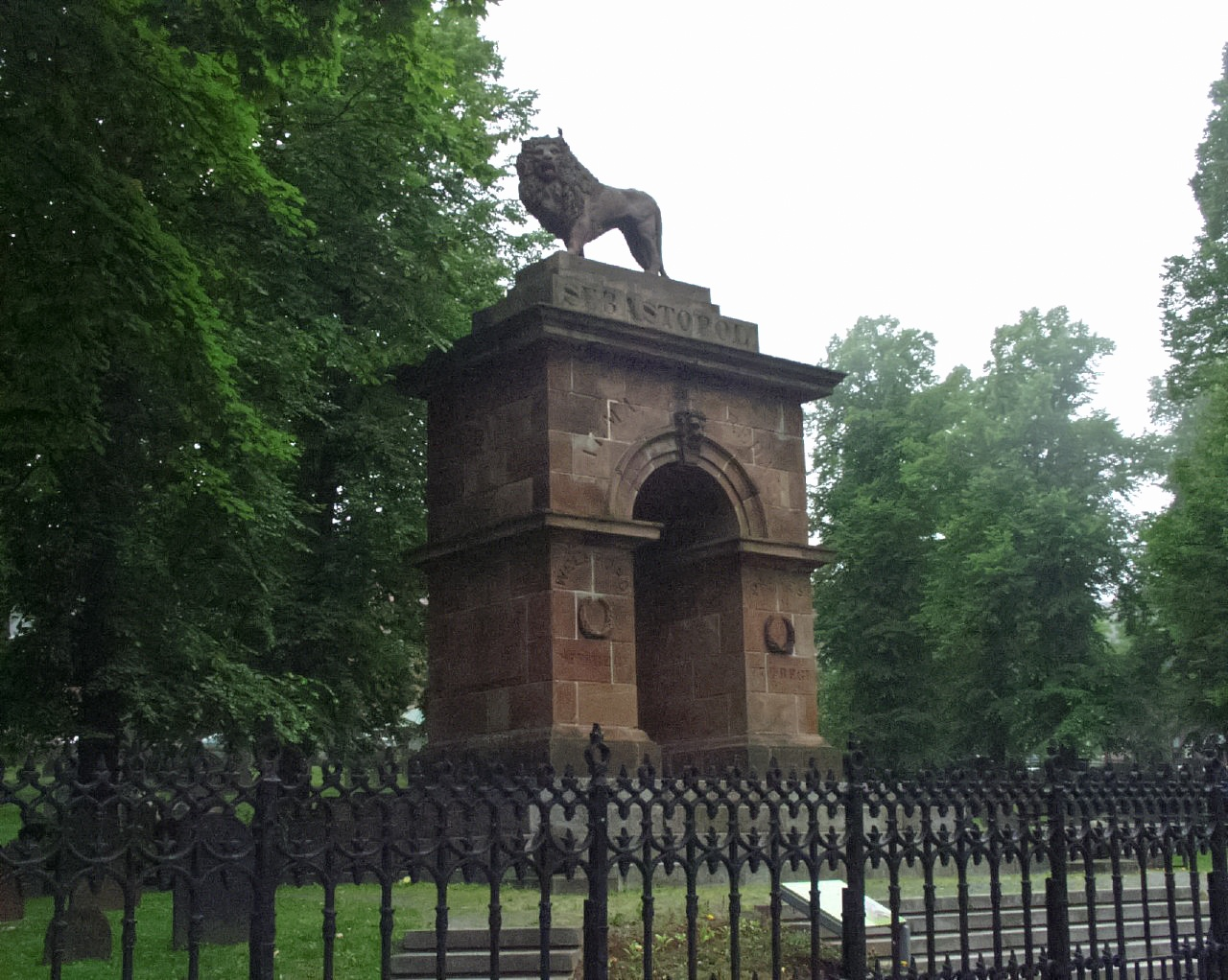
Welsford-Parker Monument

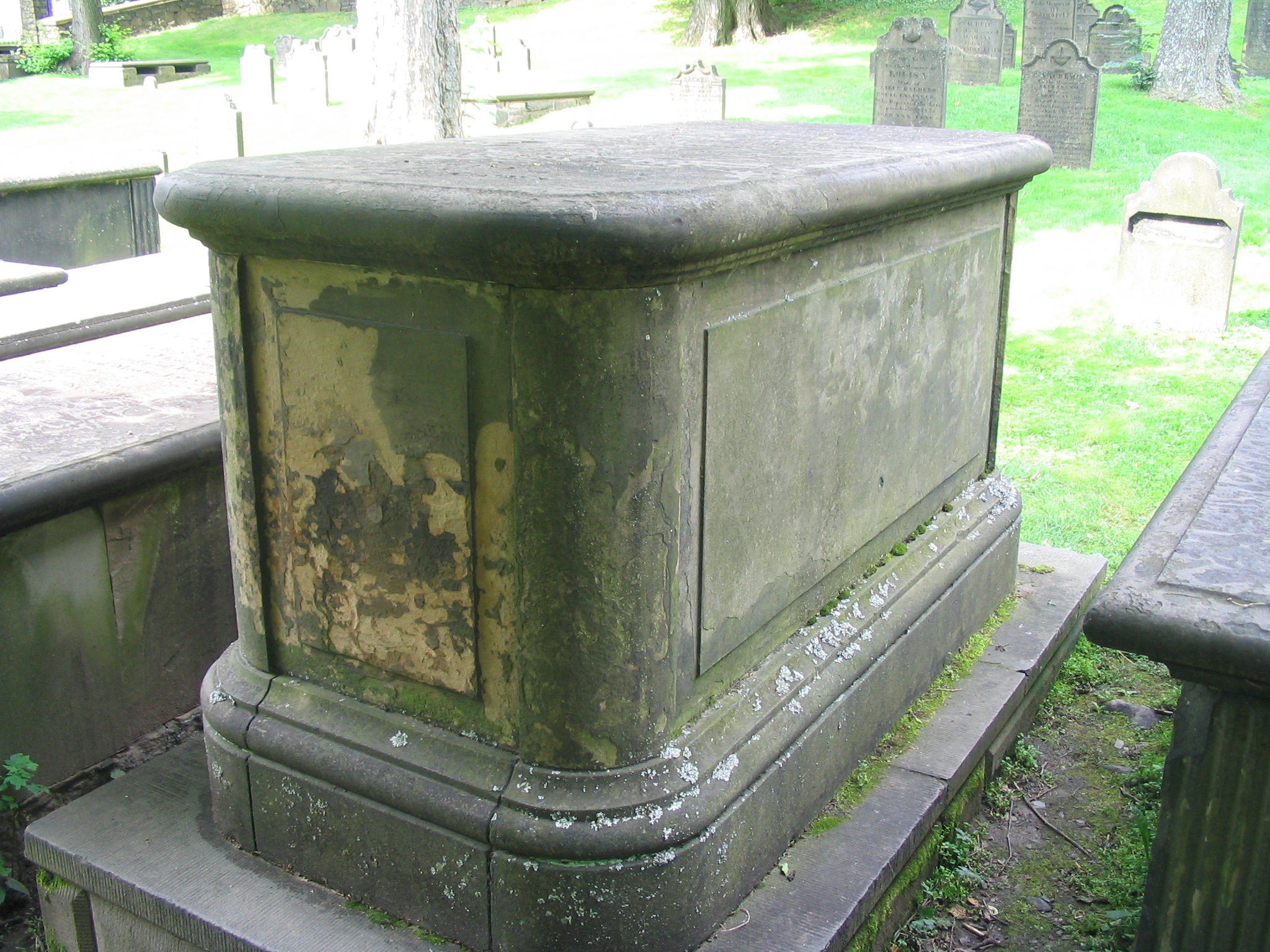
Robert Ross (British Army officer)

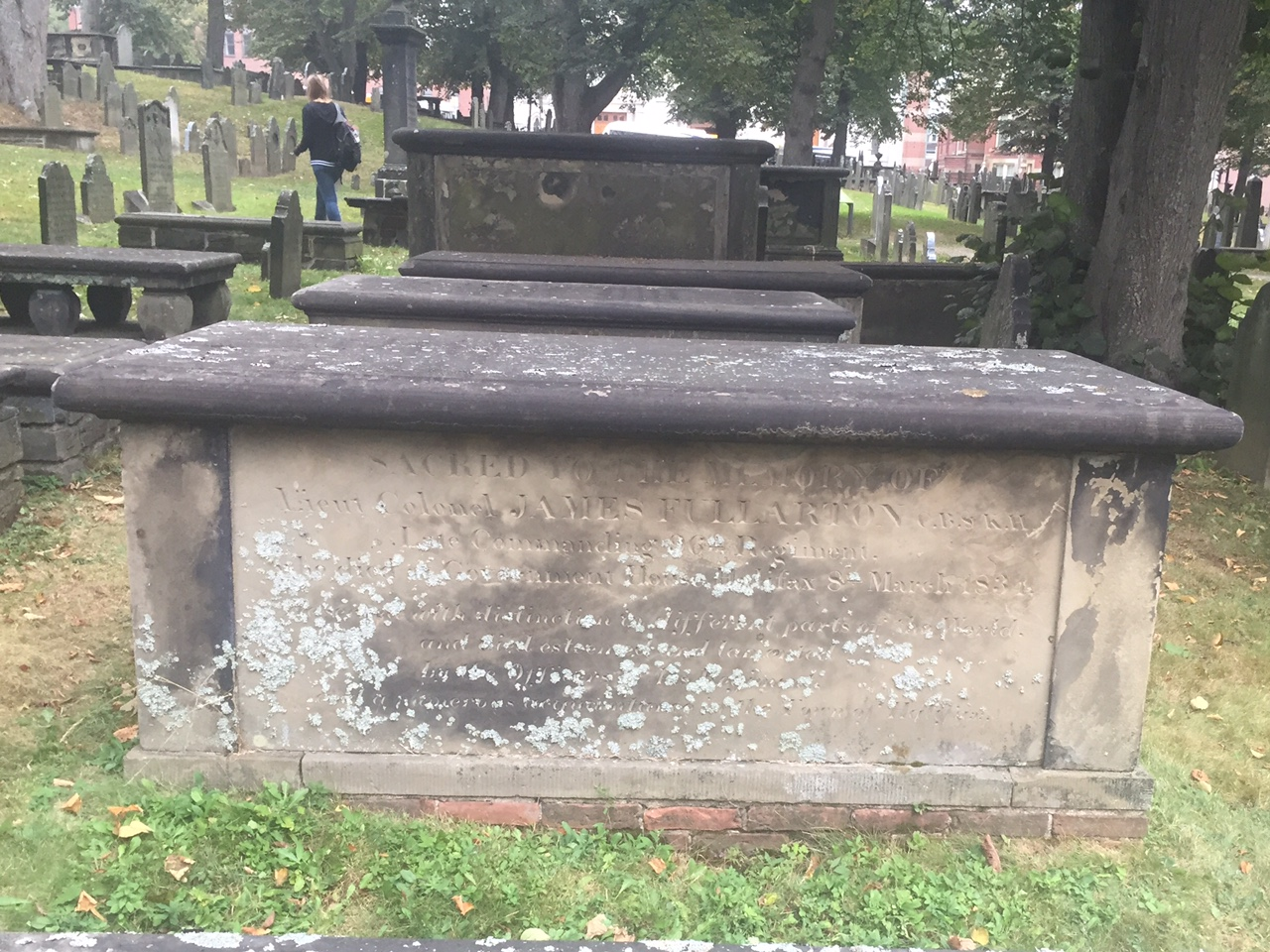
Lt. Col James Fullarton, died 1834, Battle of Waterloo (belonged to St. Matthew's)

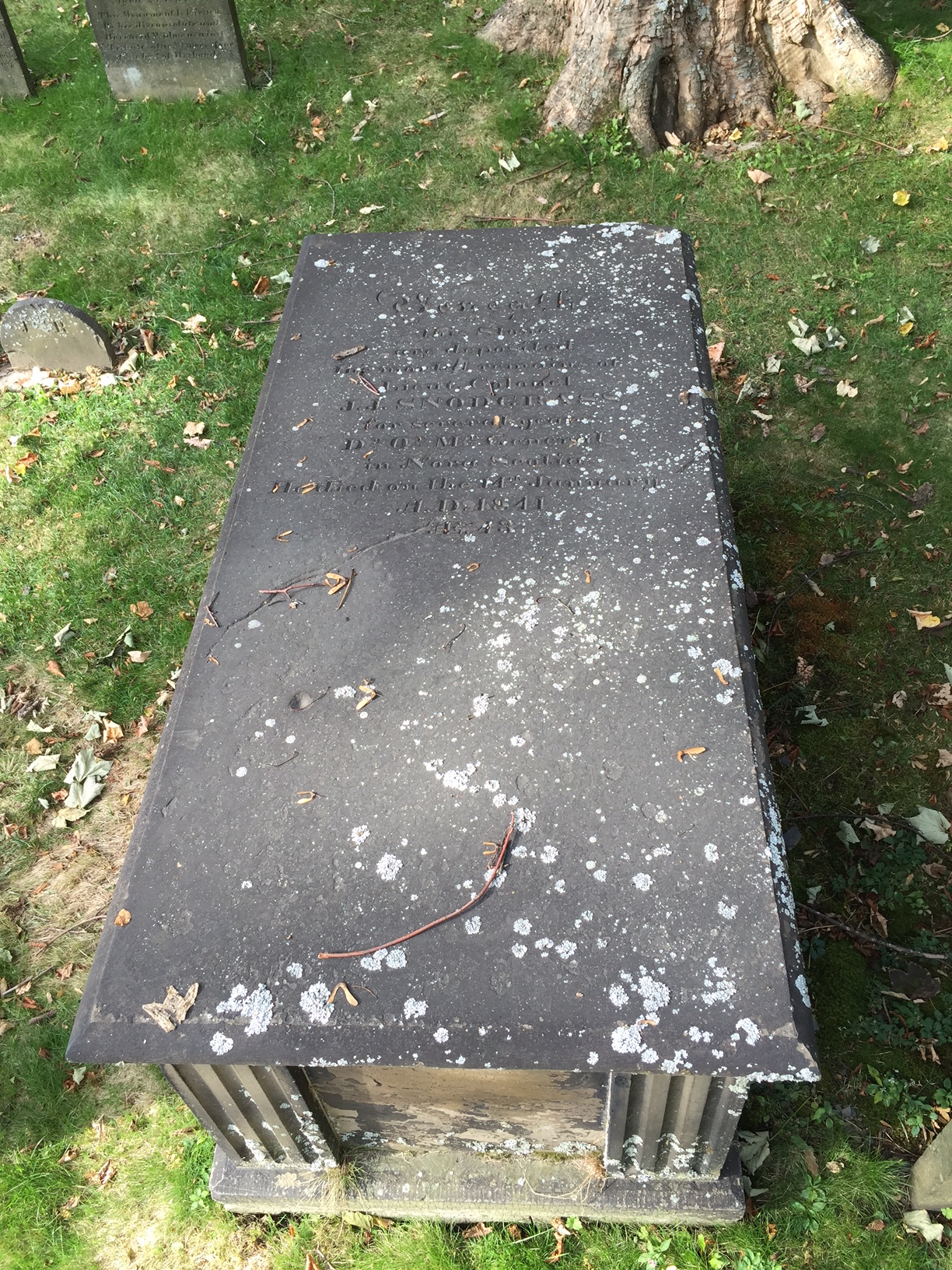
Lt. Col John James Snodgrass, died 1841, Battle of Waterloo

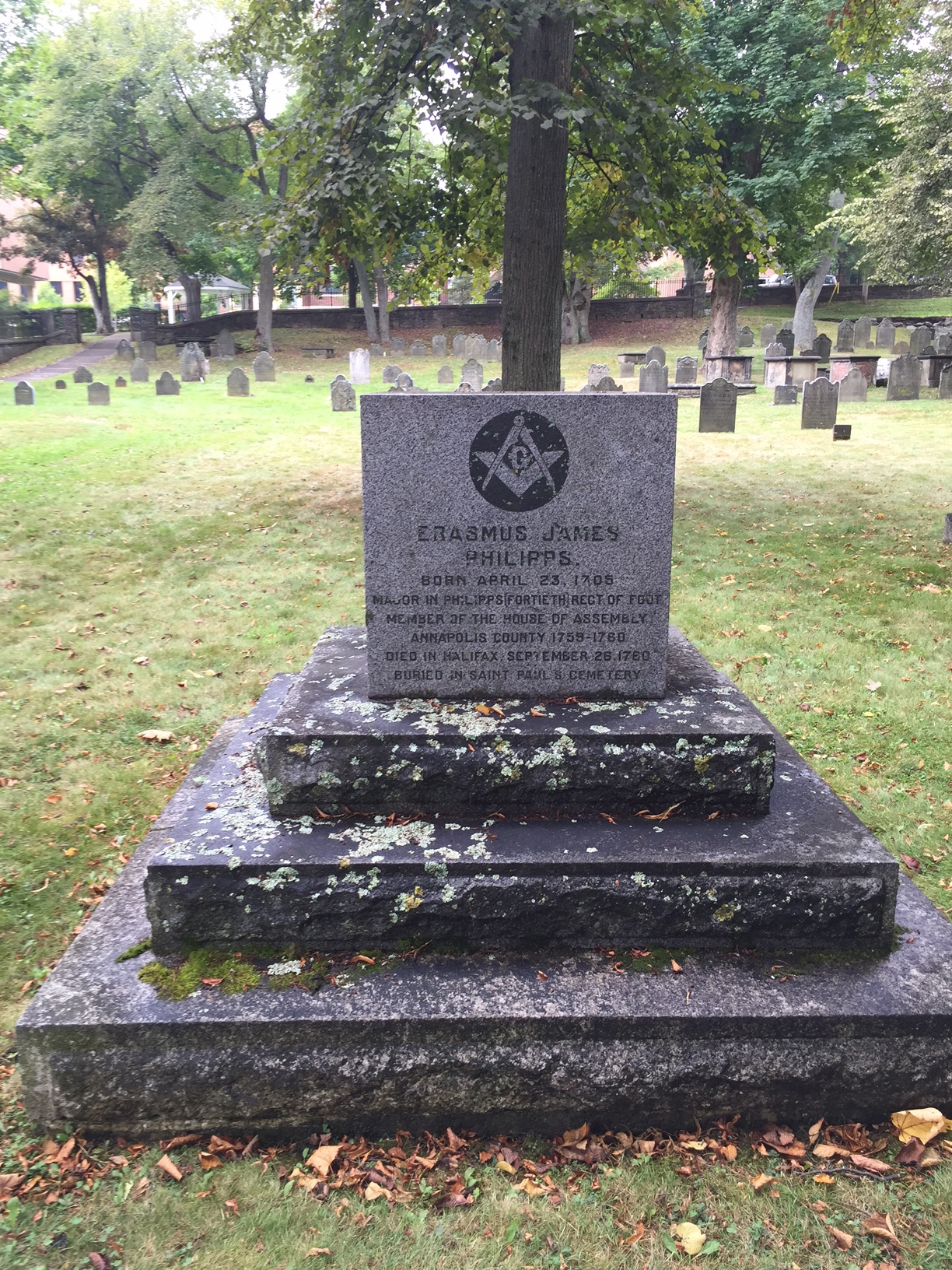
Gov. Richard Philipps nephew Capt. Erasmus James Philipps monument, died 1760, unmarked grave, 40th Regiment of Foot, participated in the Battle of Grand Pré and the Cape Sable Campaign, Nova Scotia Council (1730–1760)

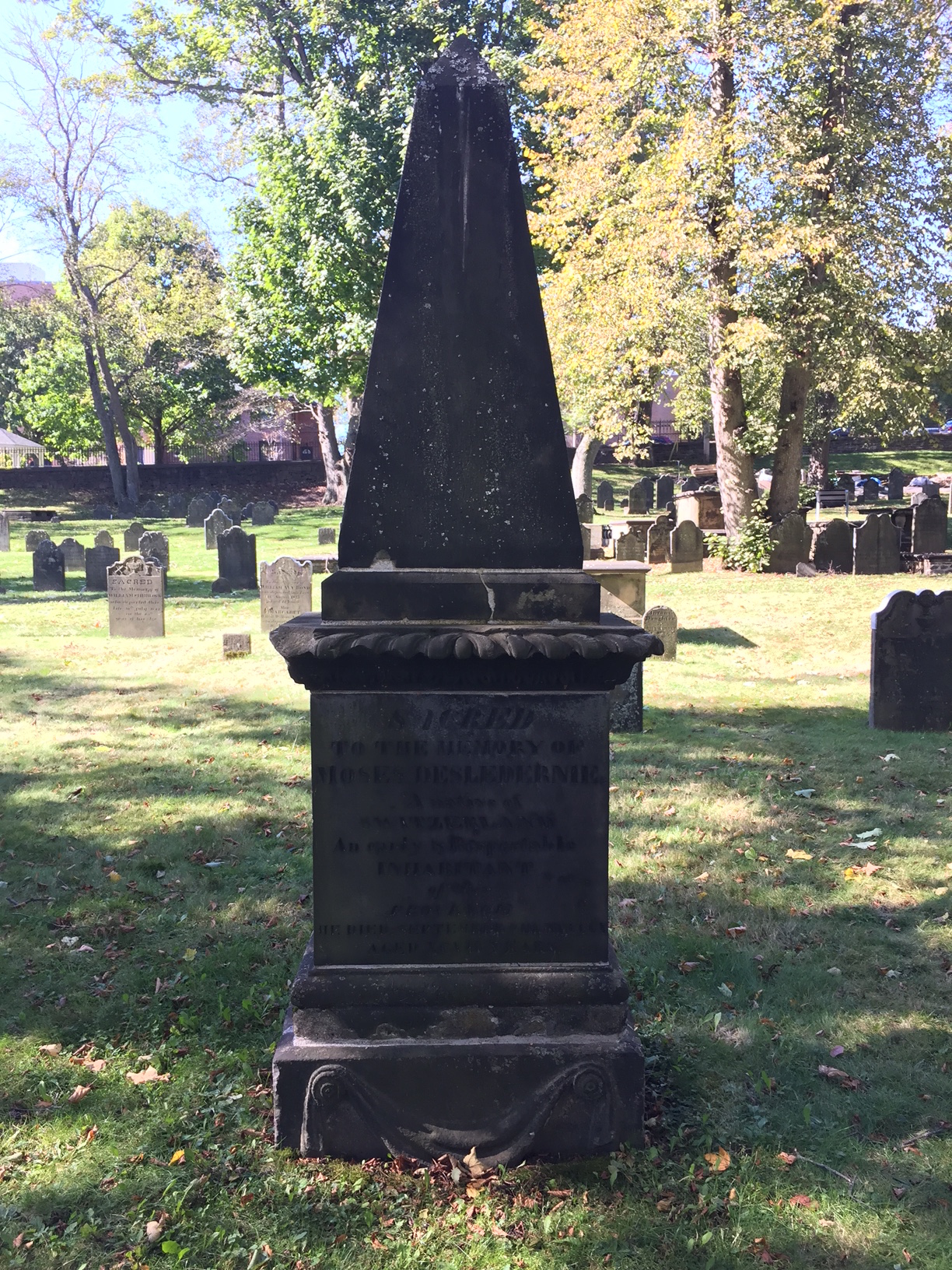
Moses Delesdernier

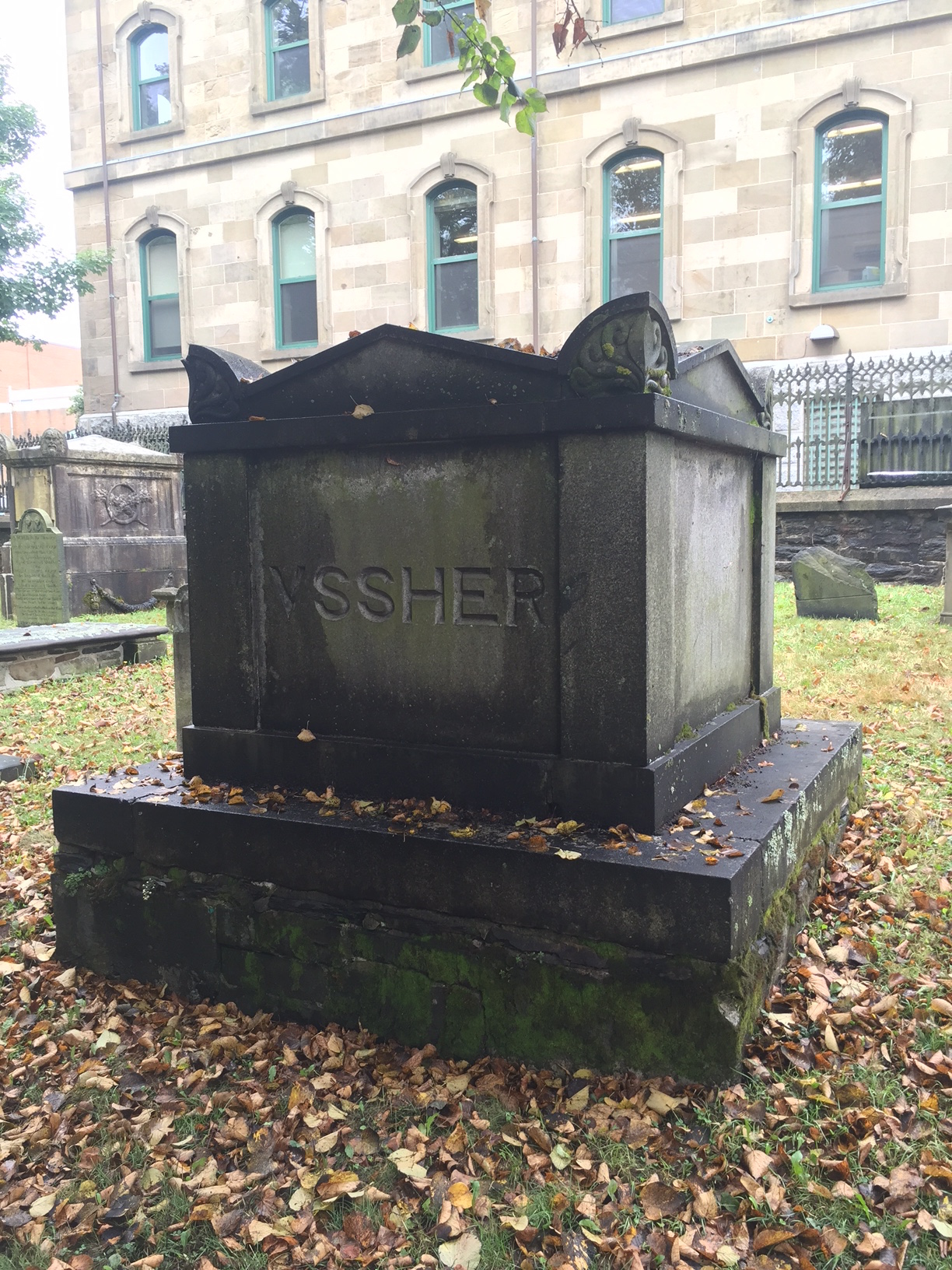
Grave of Sir Thomas Ussher's wife, Eliza Ussher, died 1835

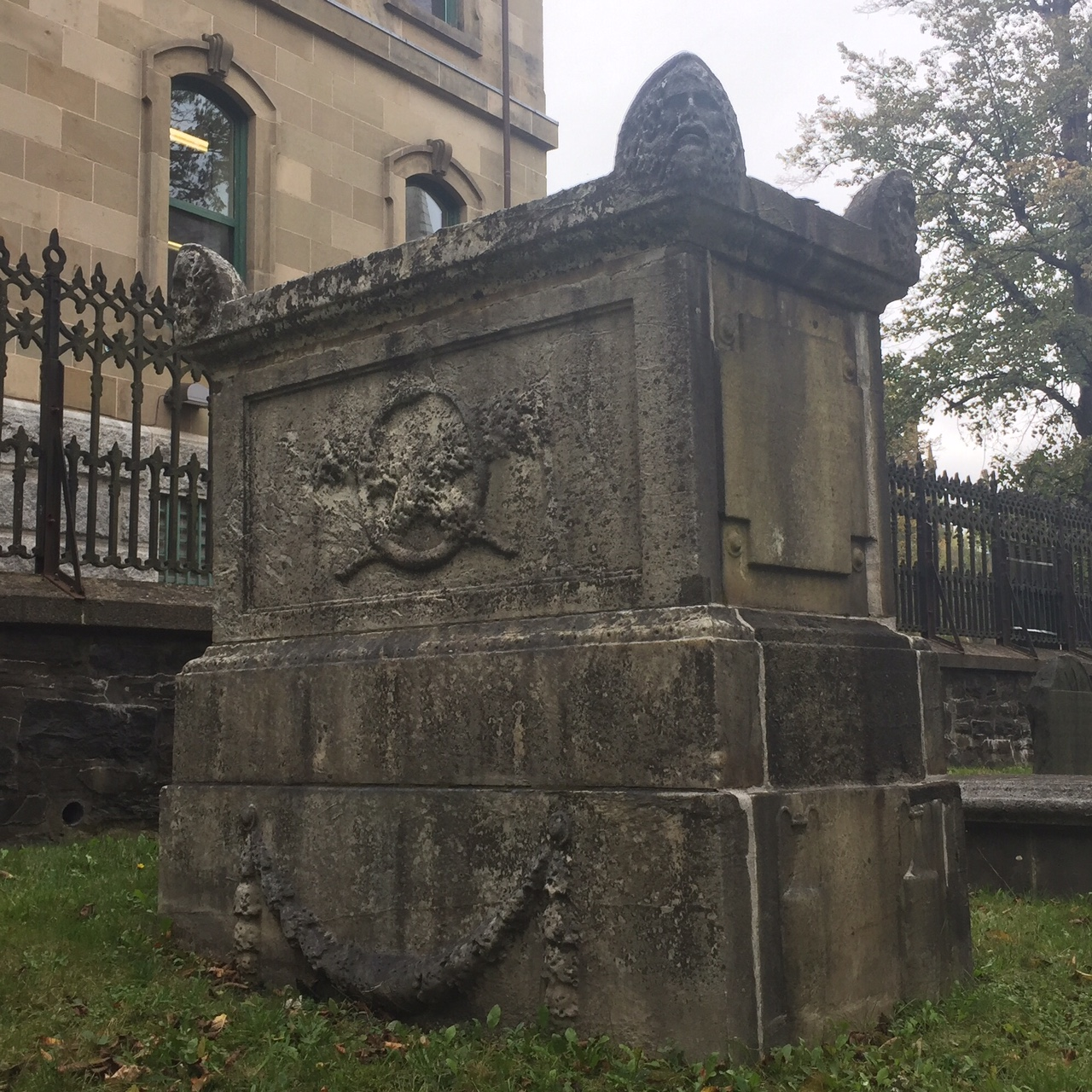
Grave of William Lawson's father and family

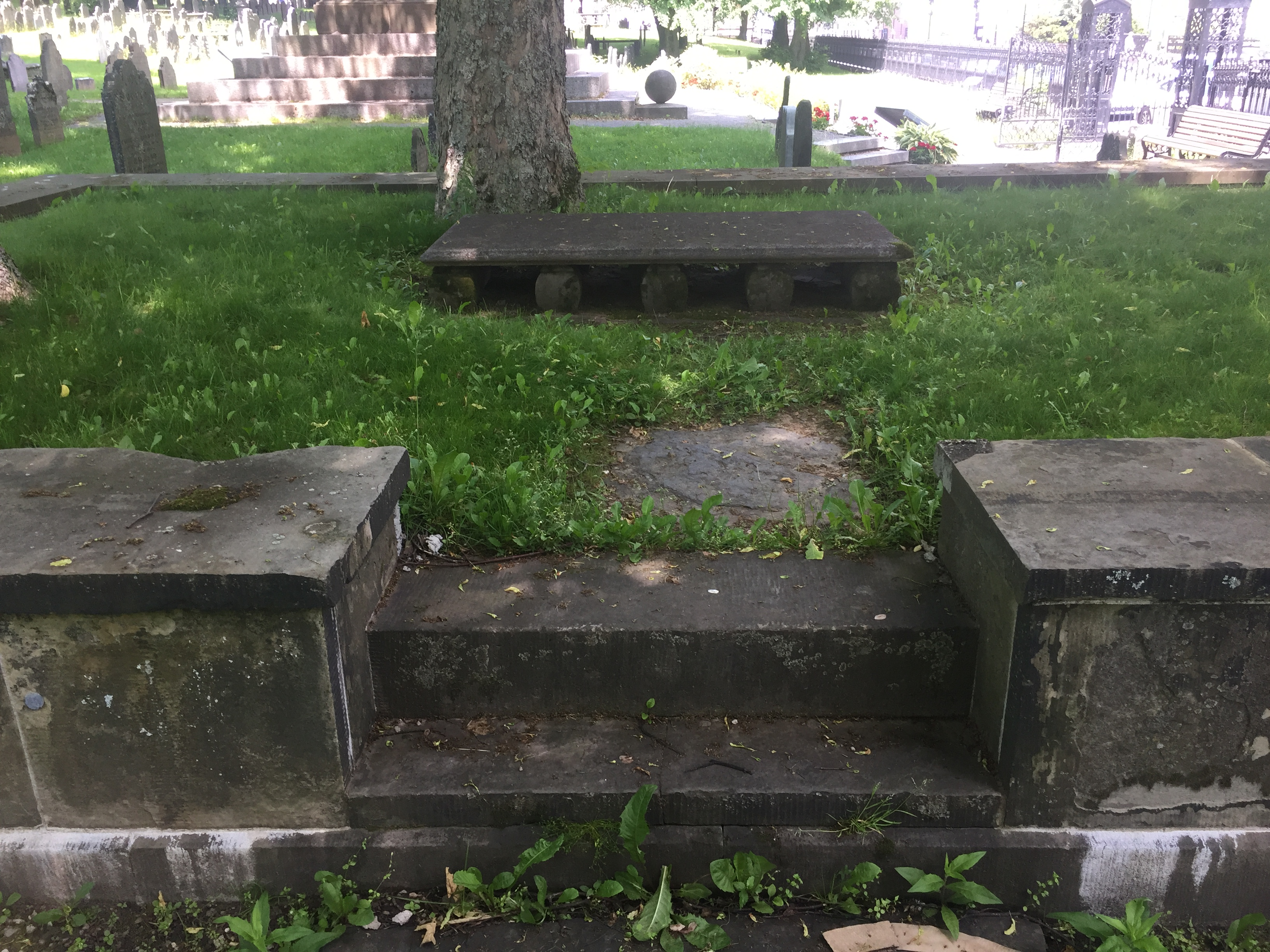
Honourable Thomas Cochran (St. Matthew's)

== Notable interments ==
=== Founding of Halifax (1749–1776) ===
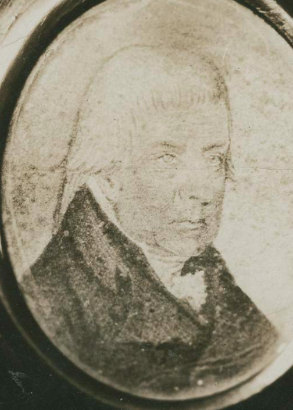
John George Pyke's father John Abraham, died 1751, scalped in Dartmouth massacre, unmarked grave

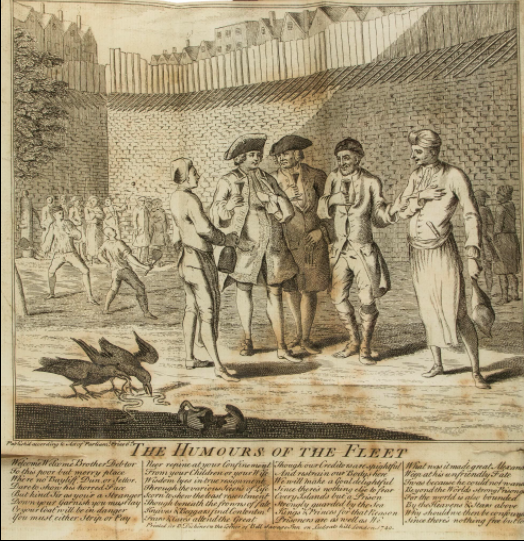
William Paget (Shakespearean actor), died 1752, unmarked grave

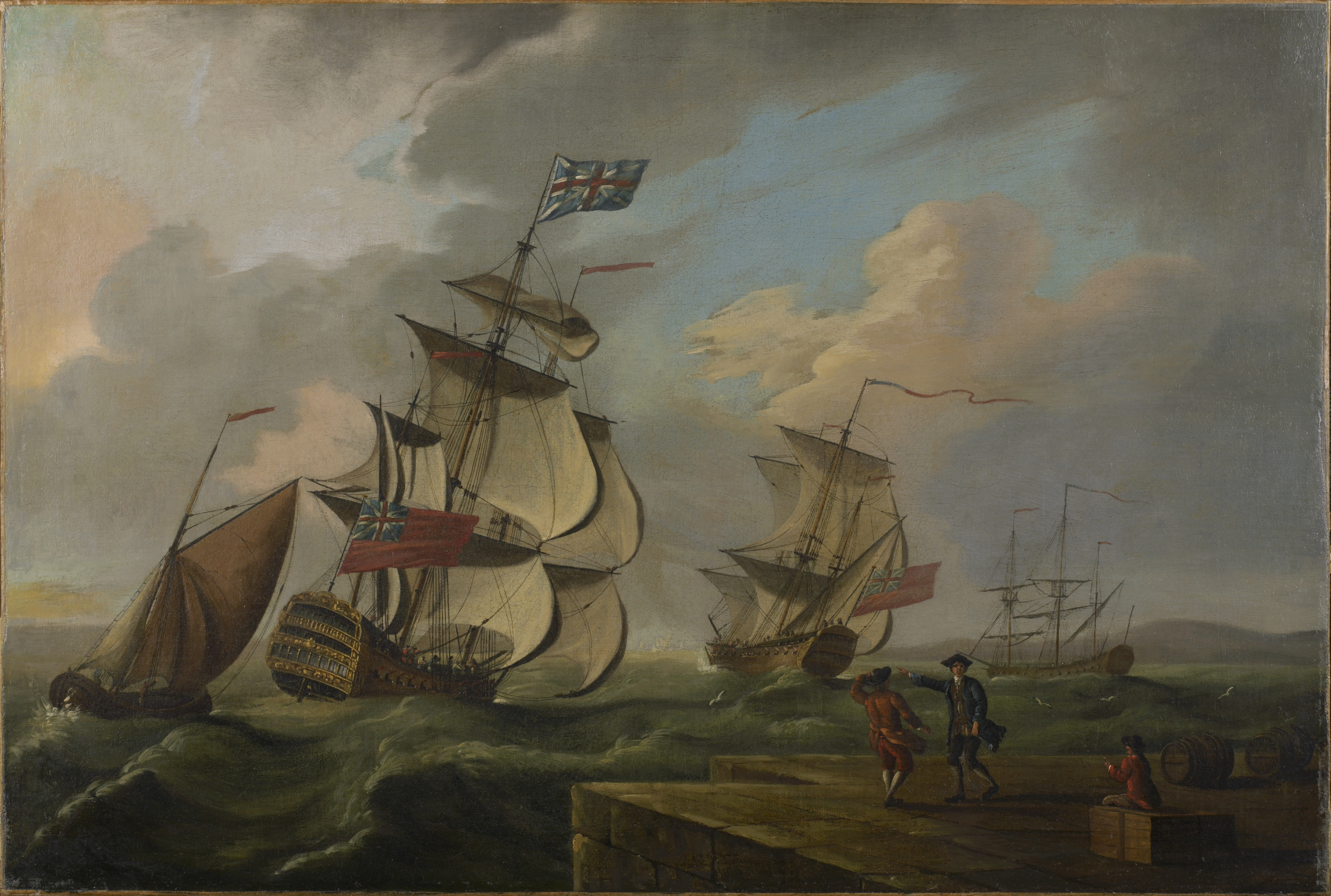
John Rous' daughter Mary, died 1775 (Rous was in the Battle at Chignecto, Siege of Louisbourg (1758))

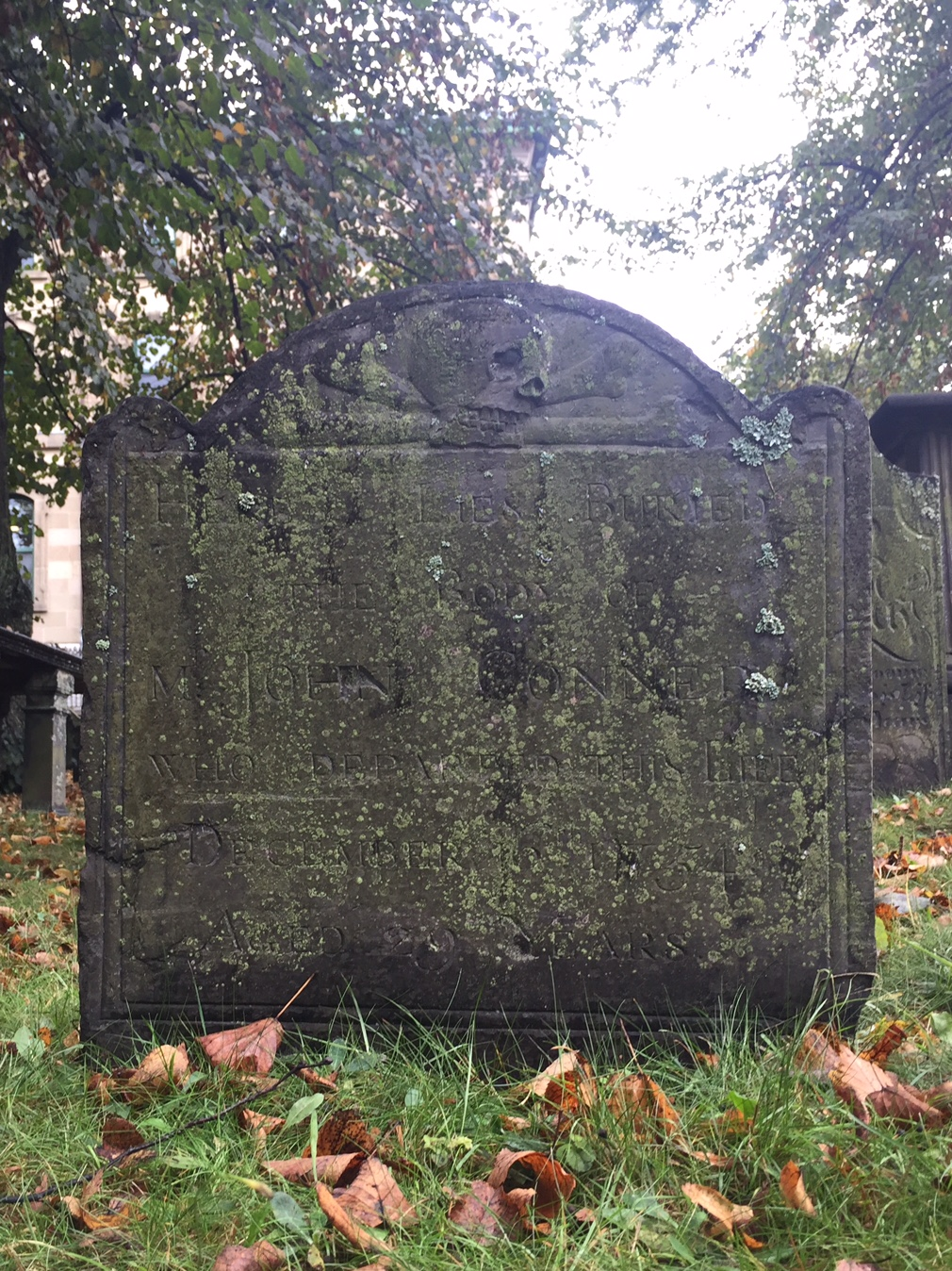
John Connor (mariner), died 1757, involved in Attack at Mocodome

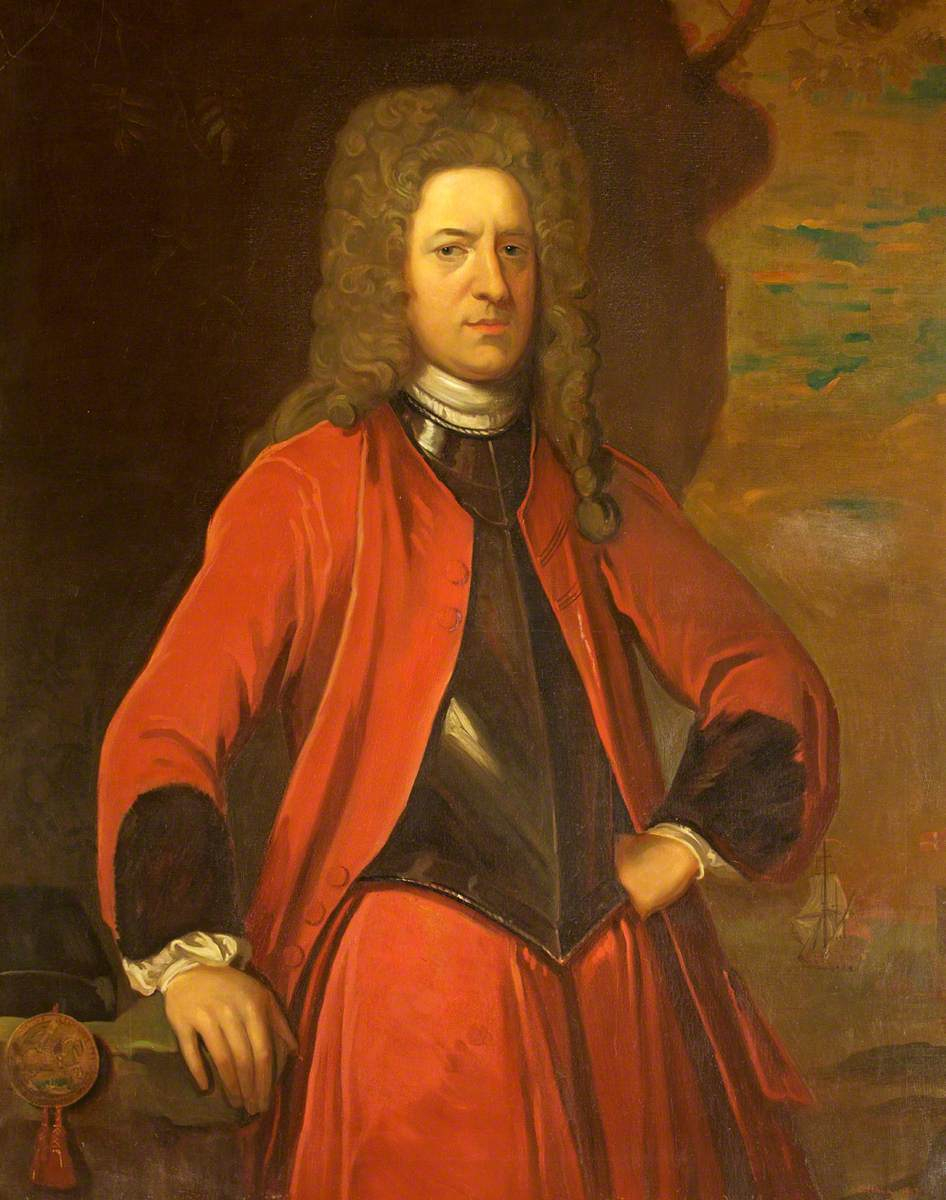
Gov. Richard Philipps's nephew Capt. Erasmus James Philipps, died 1760, 40th Regiment of Foot, participated in the Battle of Grand Pré and the Cape Sable Campaign, Nova Scotia Council (1730–1760)

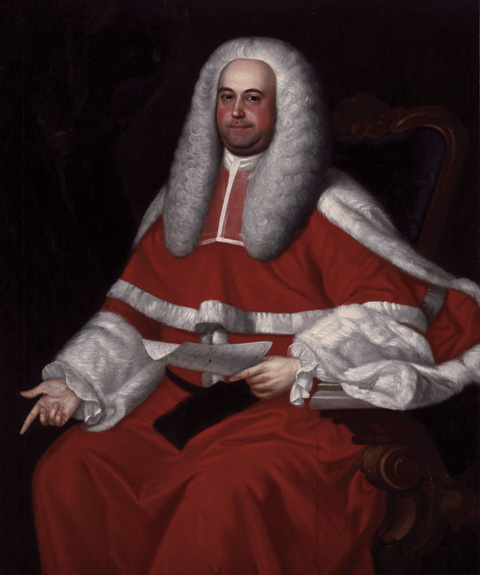
Jonathan Belcher (jurist), died 1776, participated in the Halifax Treaty with Mi'kmaq (1761)

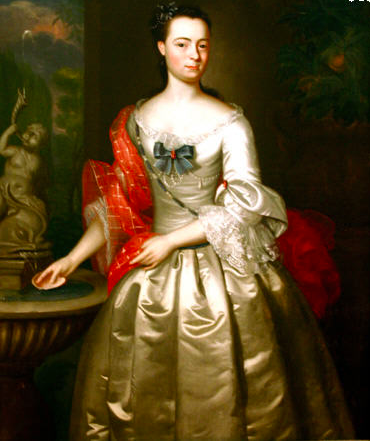
Abigail Belcher, wife of Jonathan Belcher

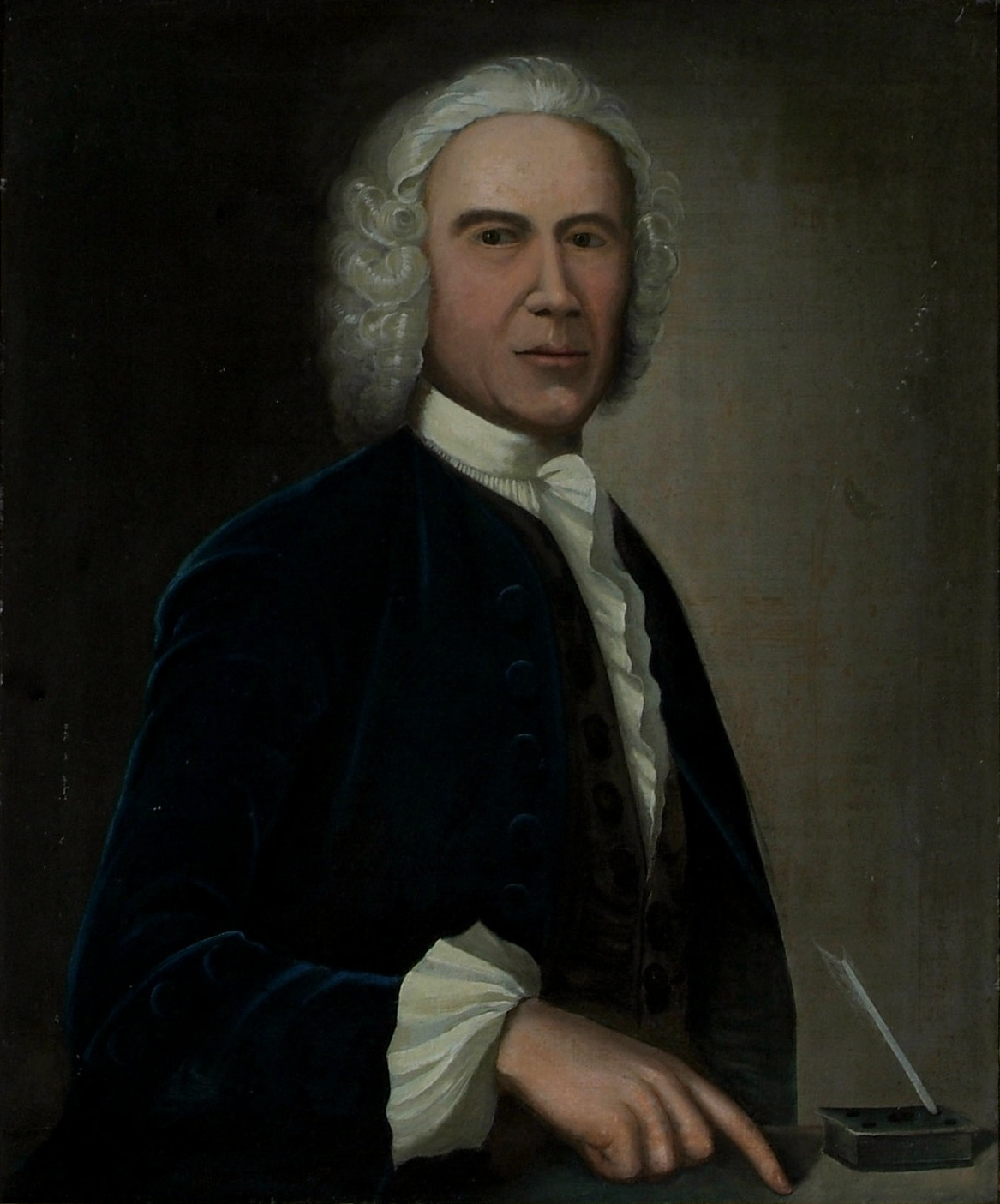
Malachy Salter, died 1781 (St. Matthew's))

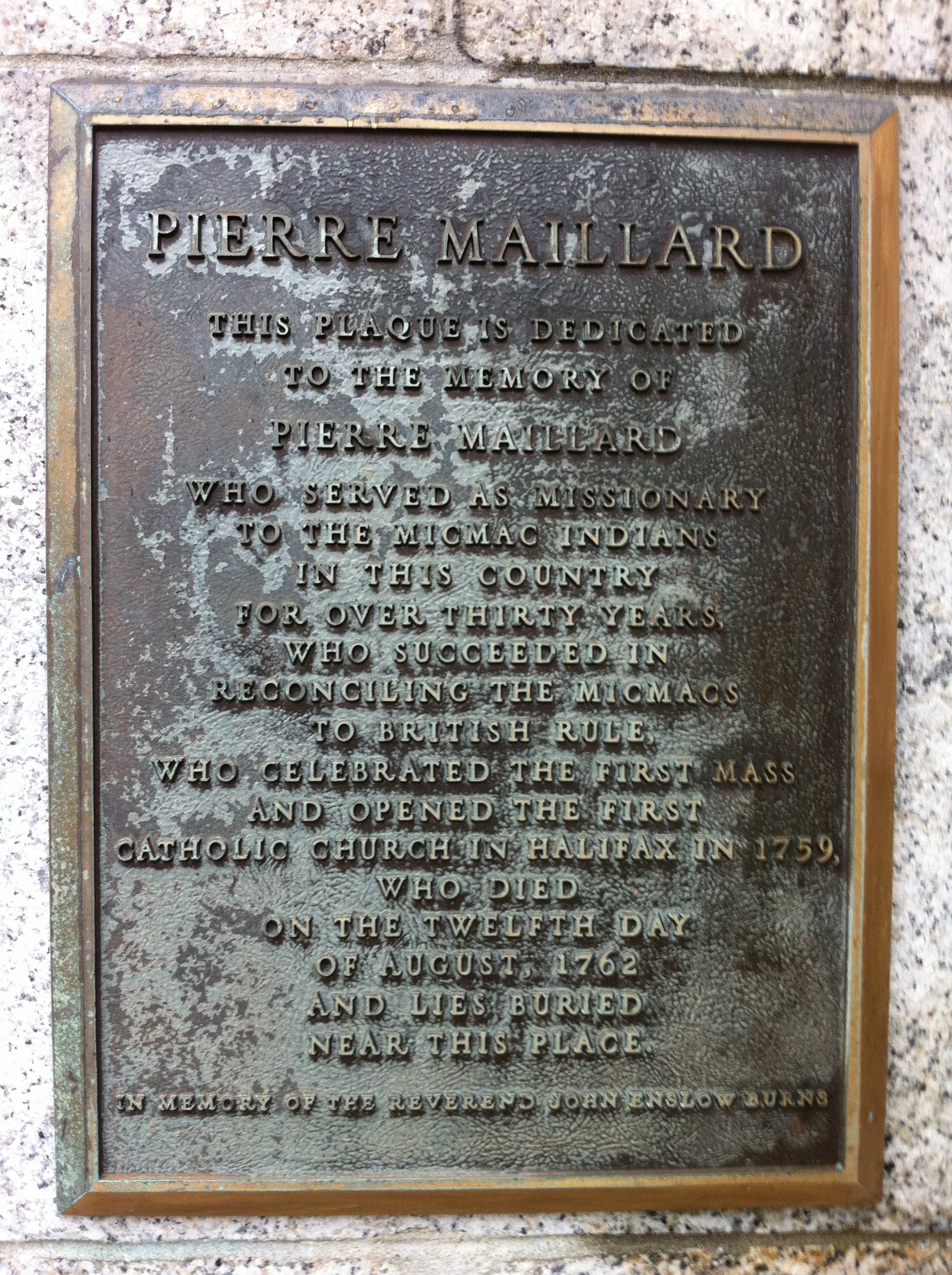
Catholic Priest Pierre Maillard was buried in the church yard.

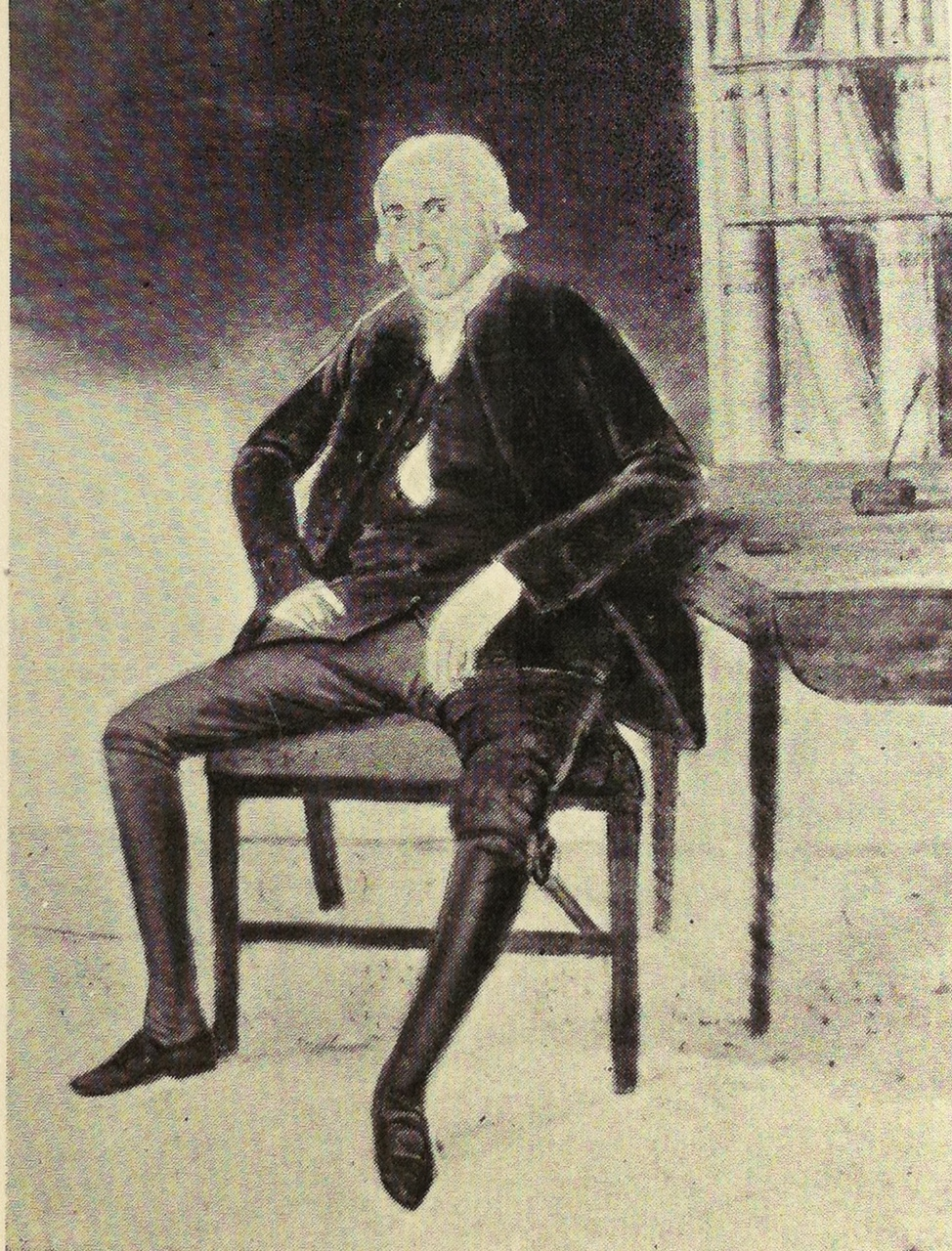
Richard Bulkeley's wife, died 1775

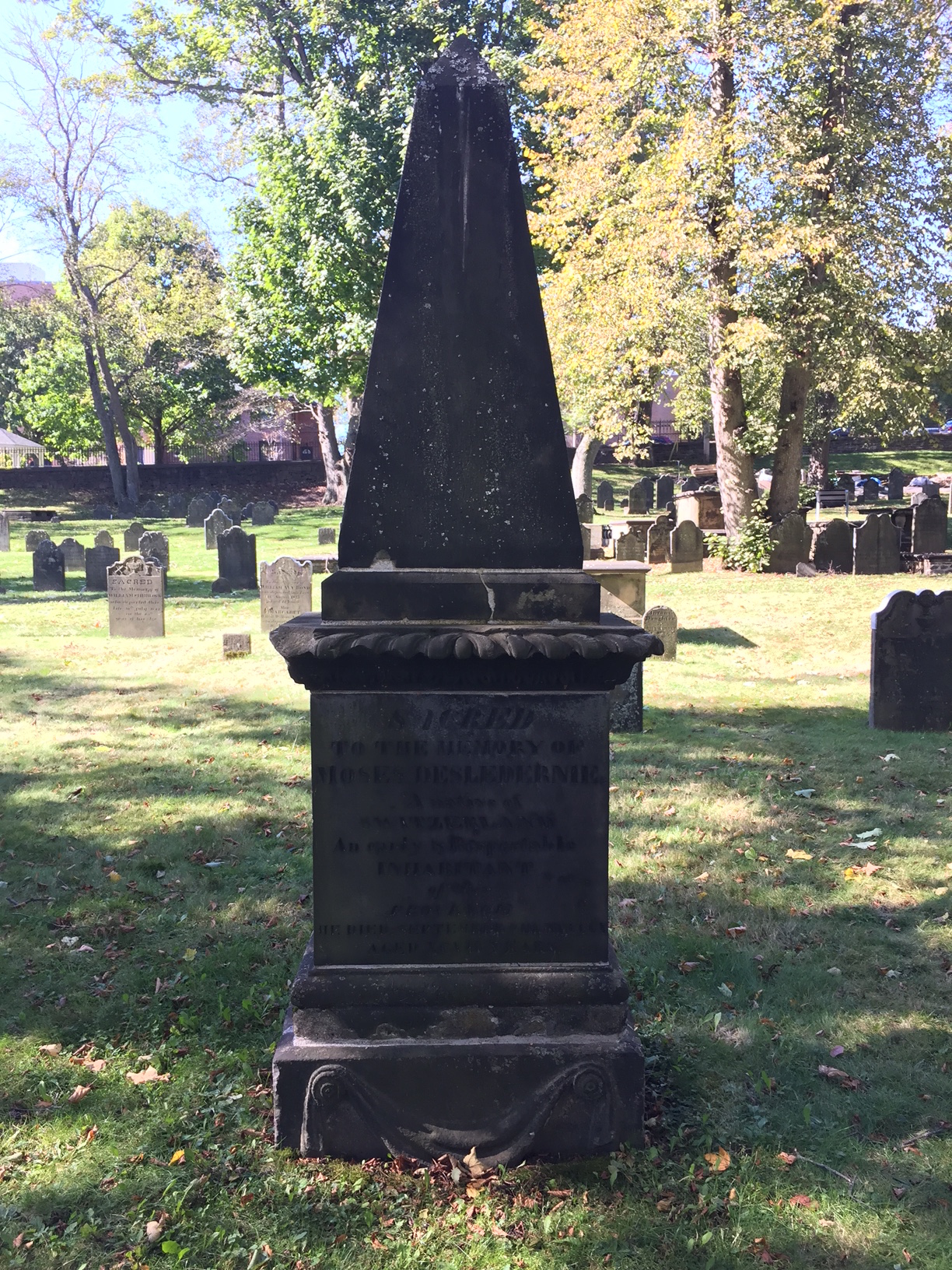
Moses Delesdernier

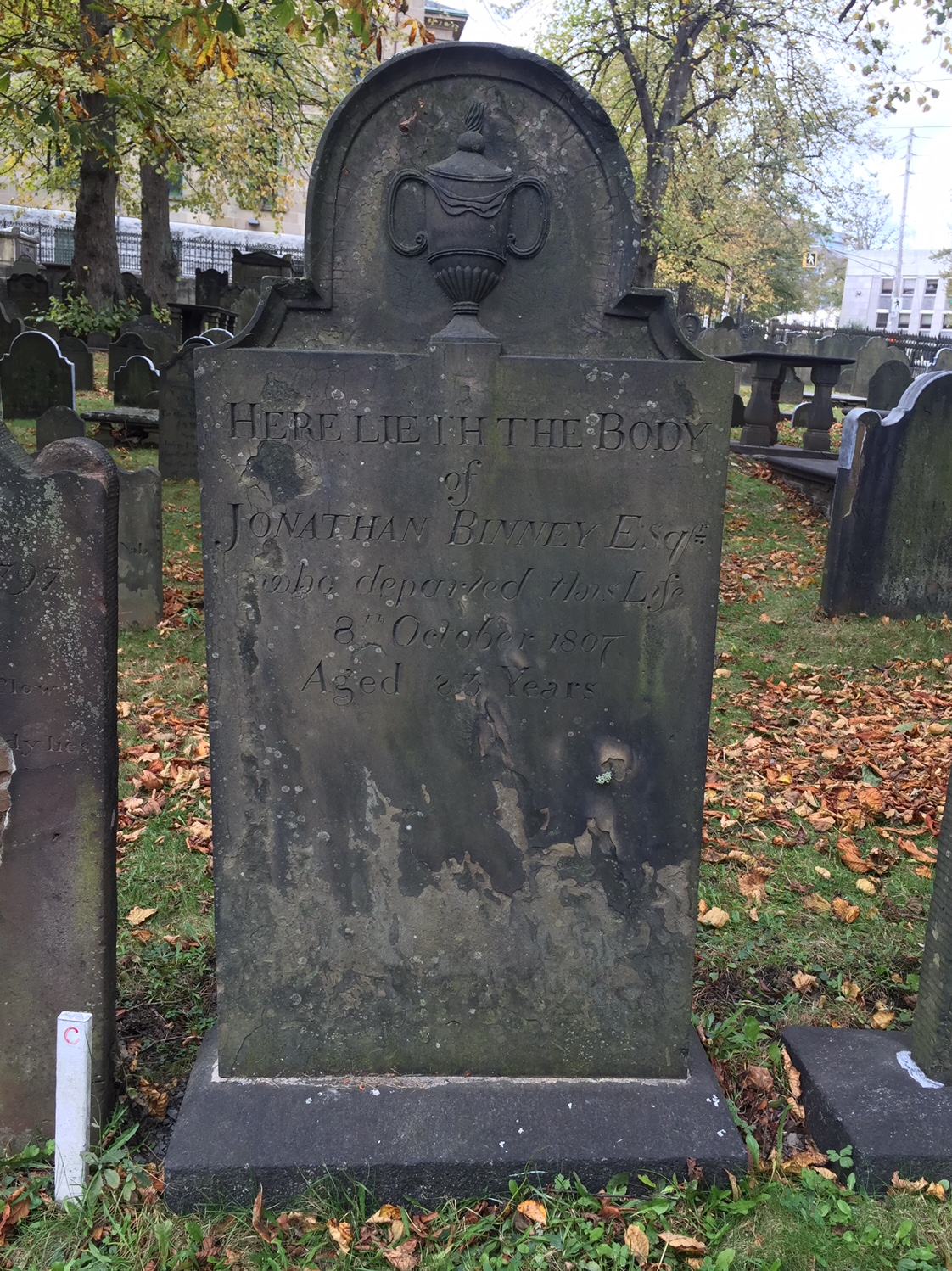
Jonathan Binney, died 1807, signed Halifax Treaty with Mi'kmaq people (1761)
- Mary Morris, wife of Charles Morris (surveyor general)
- James Brenton
- Honourable William Nesbitt
- John Fillis (belonged to St. Matthew's)
- Priscilla Ball, died 10 May 1791, Black servant, unmarked grave
- Mi'kmaw Chief Francis [Muis/ Muice], died 16 February 1781, unmarked grave
- Captain William Kensey (Kenzie, Kinsey), sloop Vulture (1753–1755), died 30 April 1755, unmarked grave – he engaged in two naval battles to stop supplies going to the French, Mi'kmaw and Acadians; the battles were against La Margarite and another against the 'Nancy and Sally'

==== Siege of Louisbourg (1745) ====
Many of those who first established Halifax arrived from Cape Breton, which the British of New England occupied since their Siege of Louisbourg (1745). The following participated in the Siege:

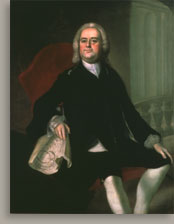
Benjamin Green, died 1772, served on the first Nova Scotia Council in Halifax (1749); signed Treaty of 1752 with Mi'kmaq

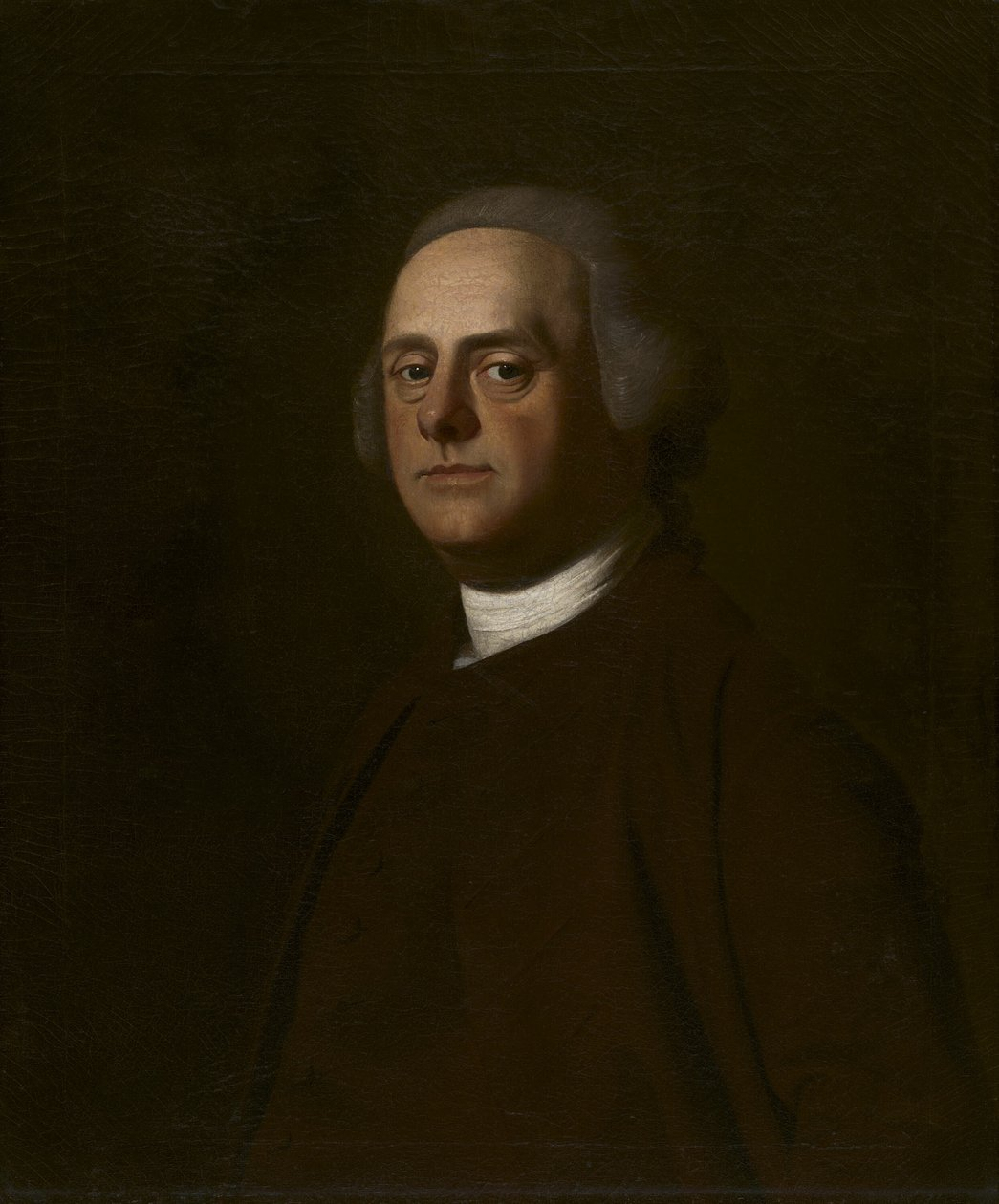
Joseph Gerrish, died 1774; also wounded at the Battle of Grand Pre; signed Halifax Treaties with the Mi'kmaq

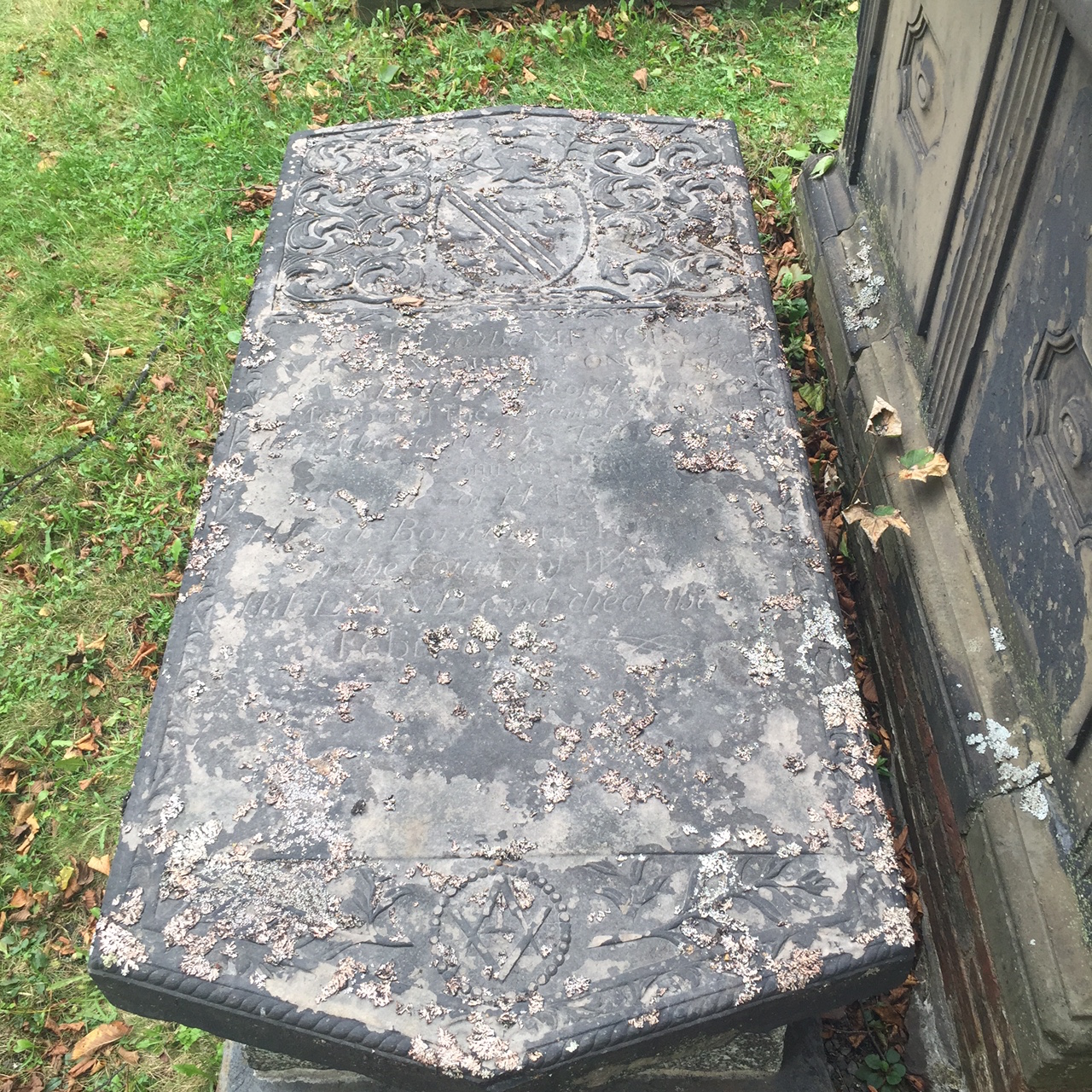
Winckworth Tonge, died 1792, also fought in Battle of Fort Beauséjour and Battle of the Plains of Abraham

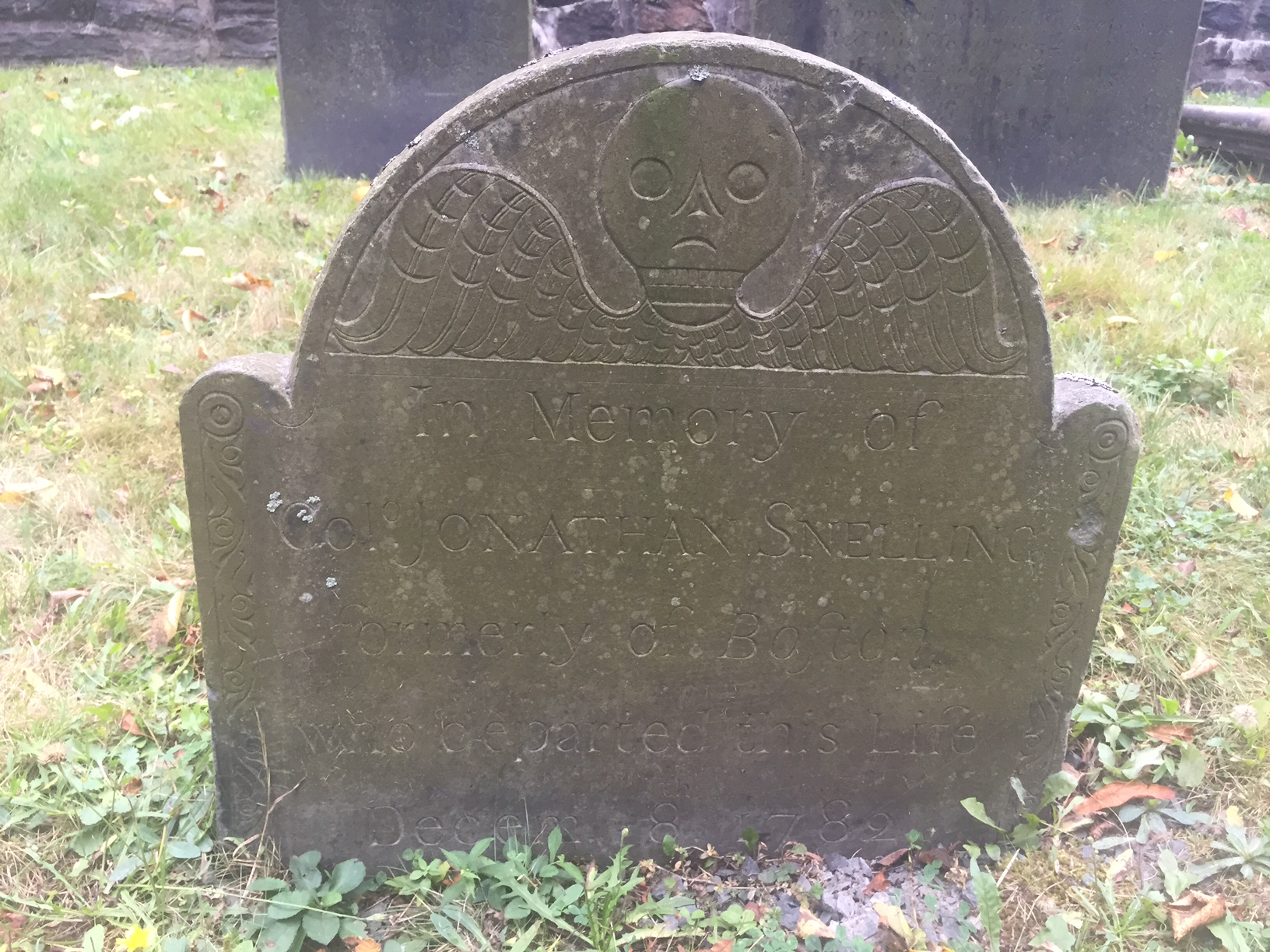
Colonel Jonathan Snelling's son Jonathan Jr. (Boston, Mass., born 28 July 1734; died 8 December 1782, in Halifax; buried 10 December 1782)
- Joseph Fairbanks, died 1790 (St. Matthew's)

=== American Revolution ===
==== Military figures ====
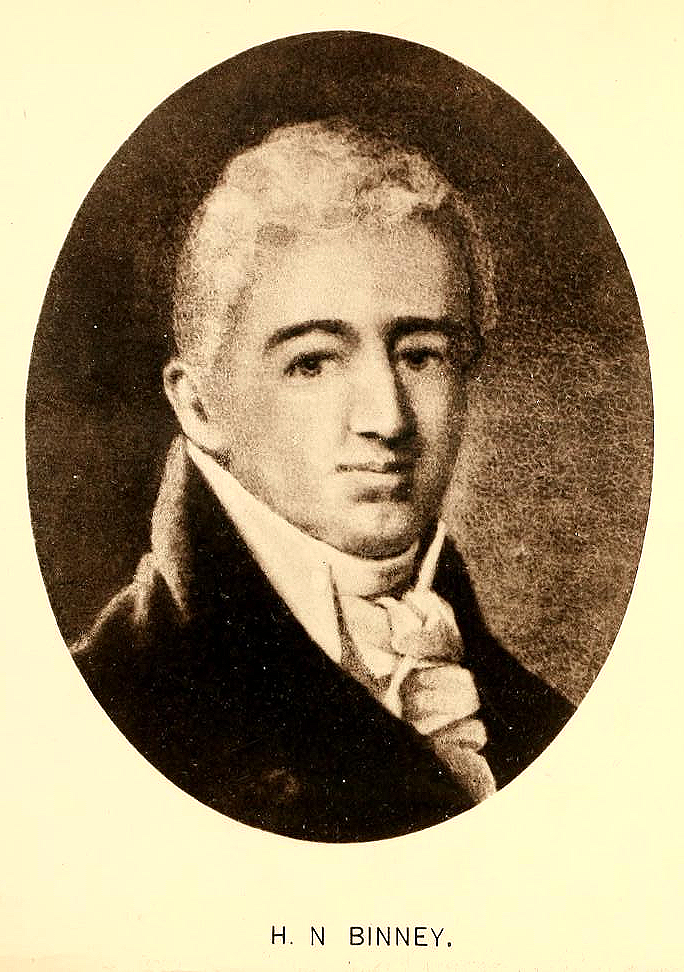
Hibbert Newton Binney, died 1842, painter, Ensign, Royal Nova Scotia Volunteer Regiment; son-in-law of John Creighton (judge)

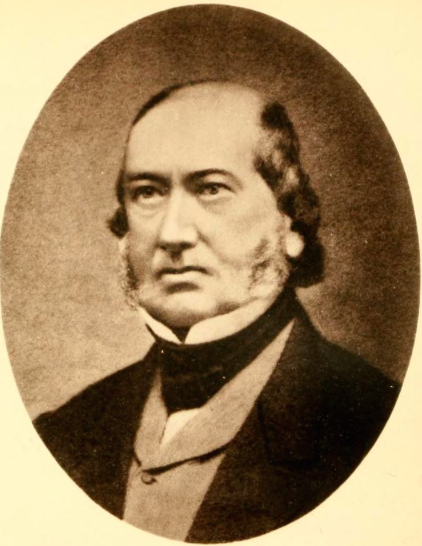
Stephen Hall Binney (1760–1836), Halifax, Nova Scotia

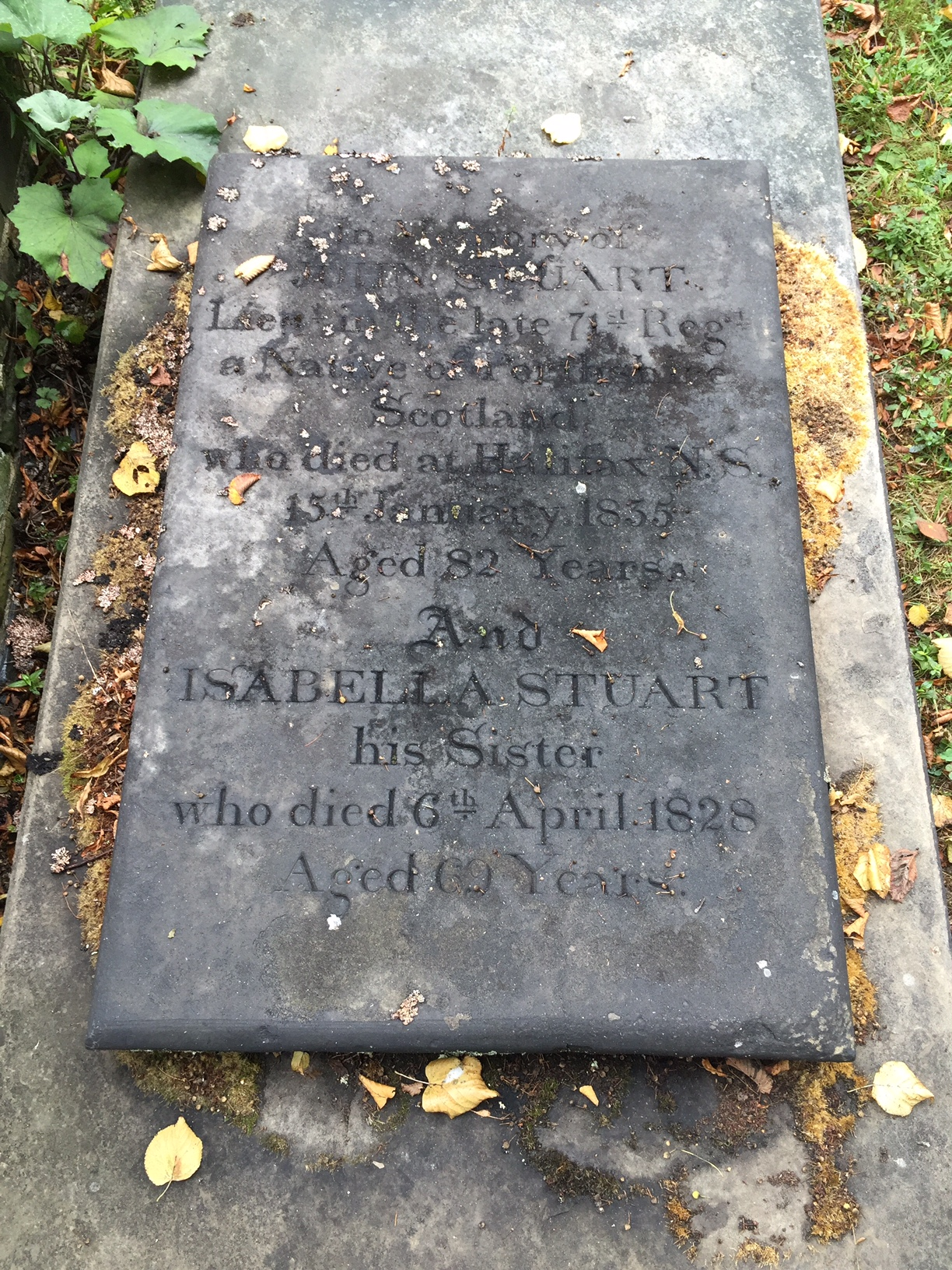
Lt. John Stuart, died 1835 71st Regiment of Foot, Fraser's Highlanders, son-in law of Dr James Boggs

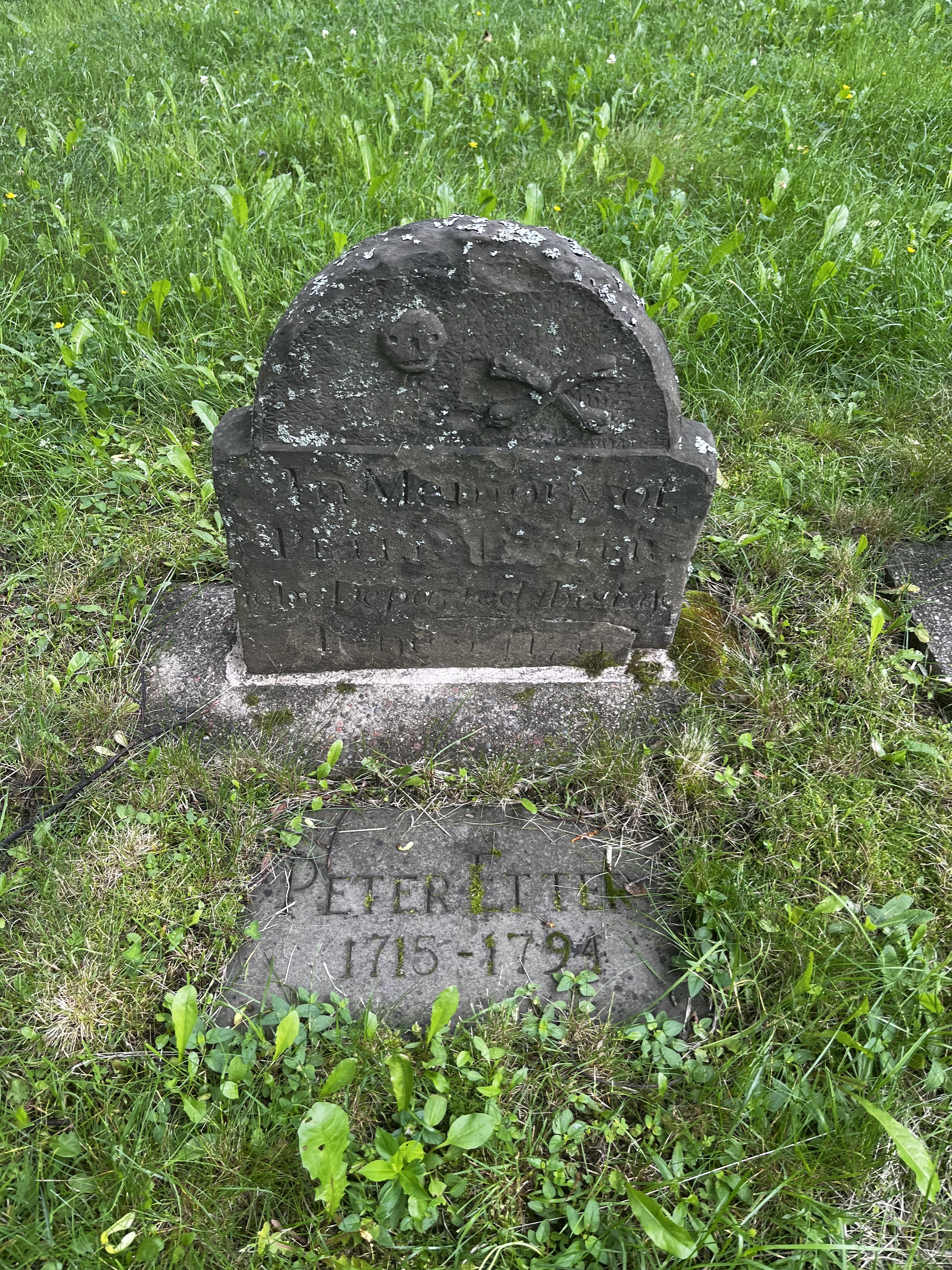
Peter Etter, died 1794, a loyalist who was friend of future President John Adams; son Peter Jr. fought with Joseph Gorham in the Royal Fencible American Regiment against the Eddy Rebellion; another son was Benjamin Etter
- John F. T. Gschwind (died 1827), surgeon for Hessians; arrived in Halifax 1781
- Charles Grant (military officer) (died 1785), 42nd Regiment of Foot – fought in the French and Indian War, Pontiac's War, and the American Revolution (New York and New Jersey campaign, the Philadelphia campaign, Battle of Stony Point, the Siege of Charleston, and the Siege of Yorktown), unmarked grave

==== Boston Loyalists ====
The following were Loyalist refugees who settled in Halifax after they were banished from New York and Massachusetts. While most Loyalist came to the region from New York (over 66%), most of the Loyalists buried with grave markers are from Boston. Reflective of the fate of many of the Loyalists, the grave of Edward Winslow (scholar) is inscribed: "his fortune suffered shipwreck in the storm of civil war". Part of the devastation of the war resulted from American family members having to choose sides. For example, the story of one American patriot listed below, Benjamin Kent. While in Boston he imprisoned his son-in-law Sampson Salter Blowers for being a Loyalist. Blowers and the rest of Kent's family (including his wife) escaped to Halifax (1776). After the war, Kent eventually moved to Halifax to be with his family, which included Chief Justice Blowers (1885). Both Blowers and Kent are buried in the Old Burying Ground.

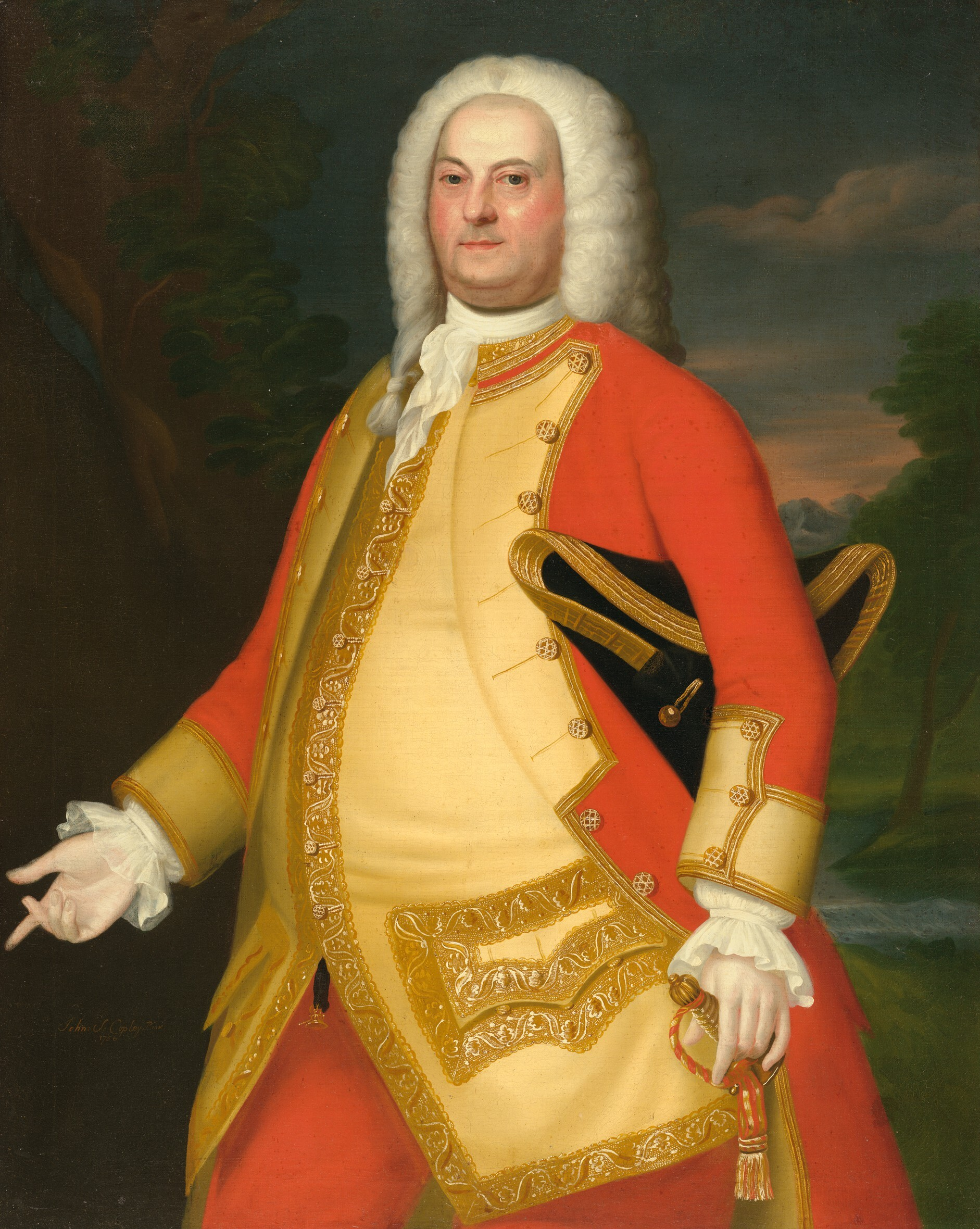
William Brattle, died 1776, the Attorney General of Province of Massachusetts Bay; "wealthiest man in Boston", owner of William Brattle House, lost gravestone

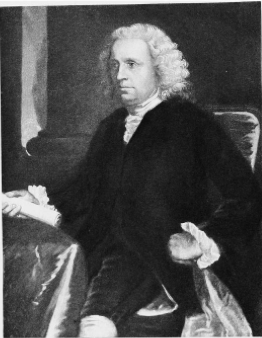
James Murray (1713–1781) by Copley;

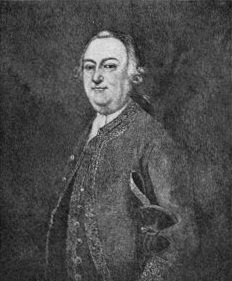
John Winslow's brother Edward Winslow (scholar), died 1784

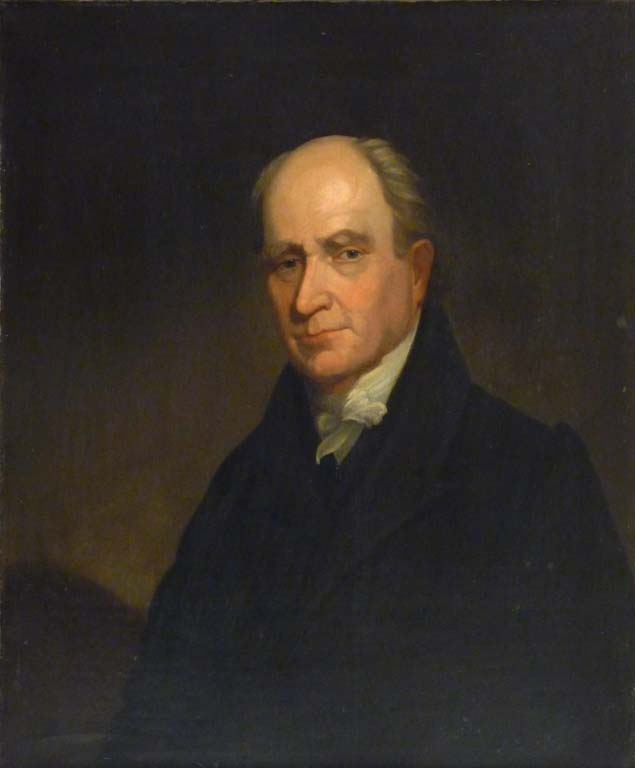
John Howe, died 1835, father of Joseph Howe

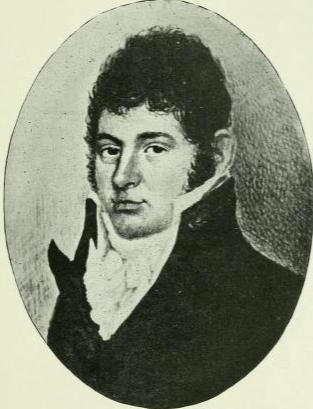
John Halliburton (surgeon), died 1808

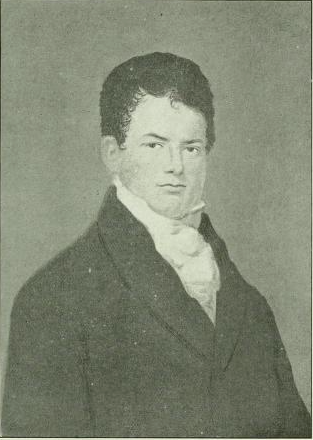
James Stewart (1765–1830)

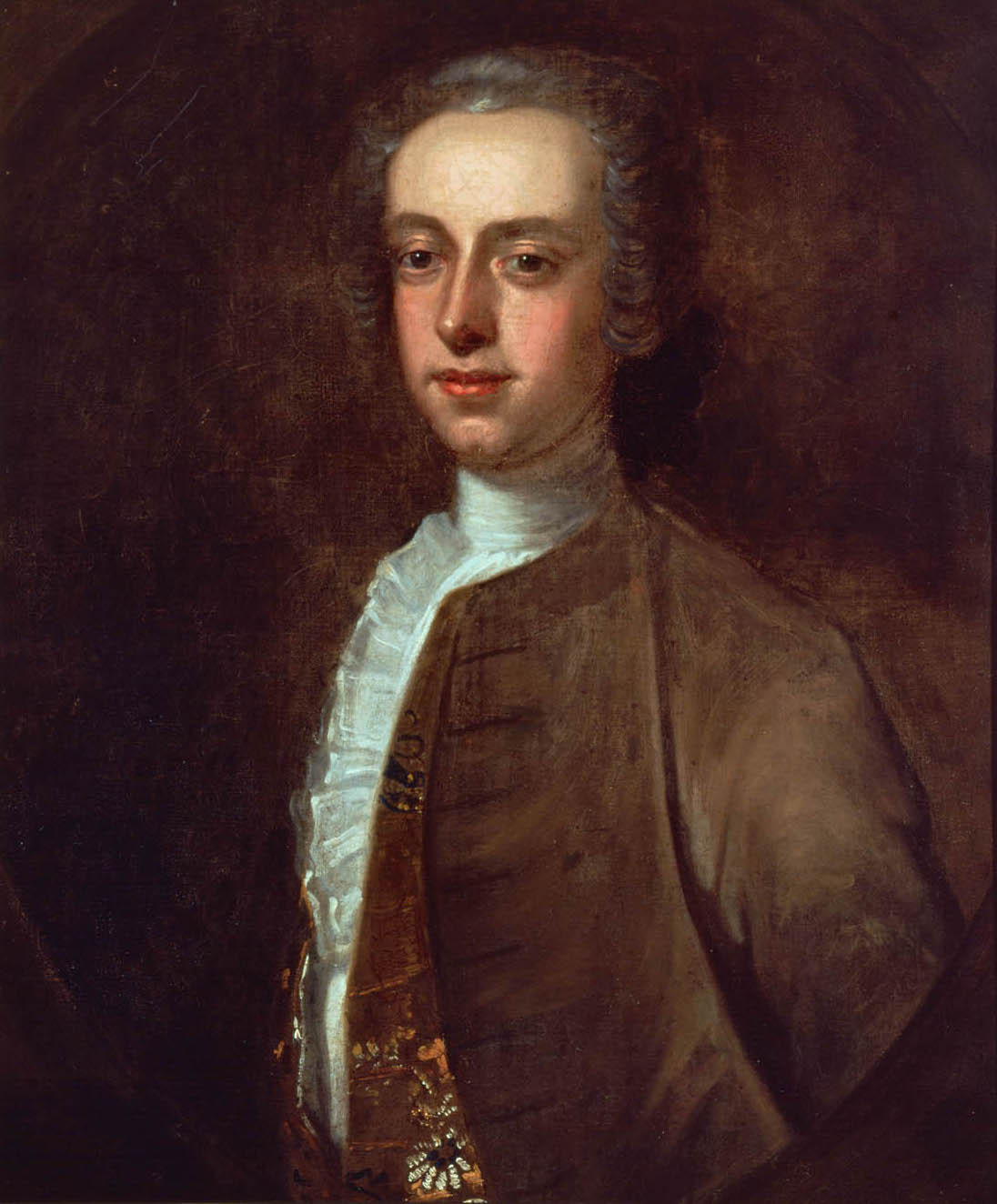
Loyalist Massachusetts Governor Thomas Hutchinson's brother Foster Hutchinson Sr., died 1799, Chief Justice of Province of Massachusetts Bay,

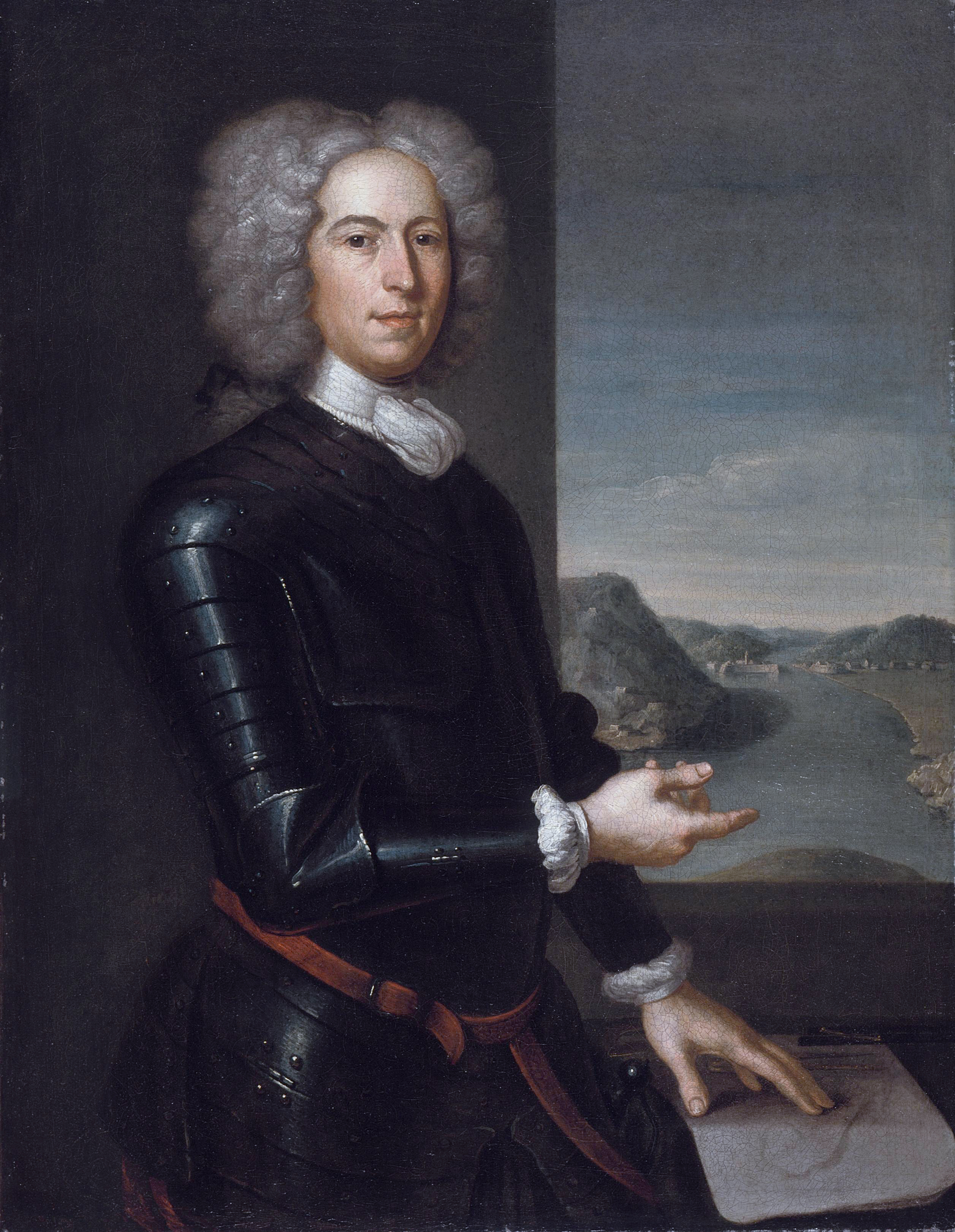
Nova Scotia Gov. Paul Mascarene's grandchild Foster Hutchinson Jr., Chief Justice, died 1815,

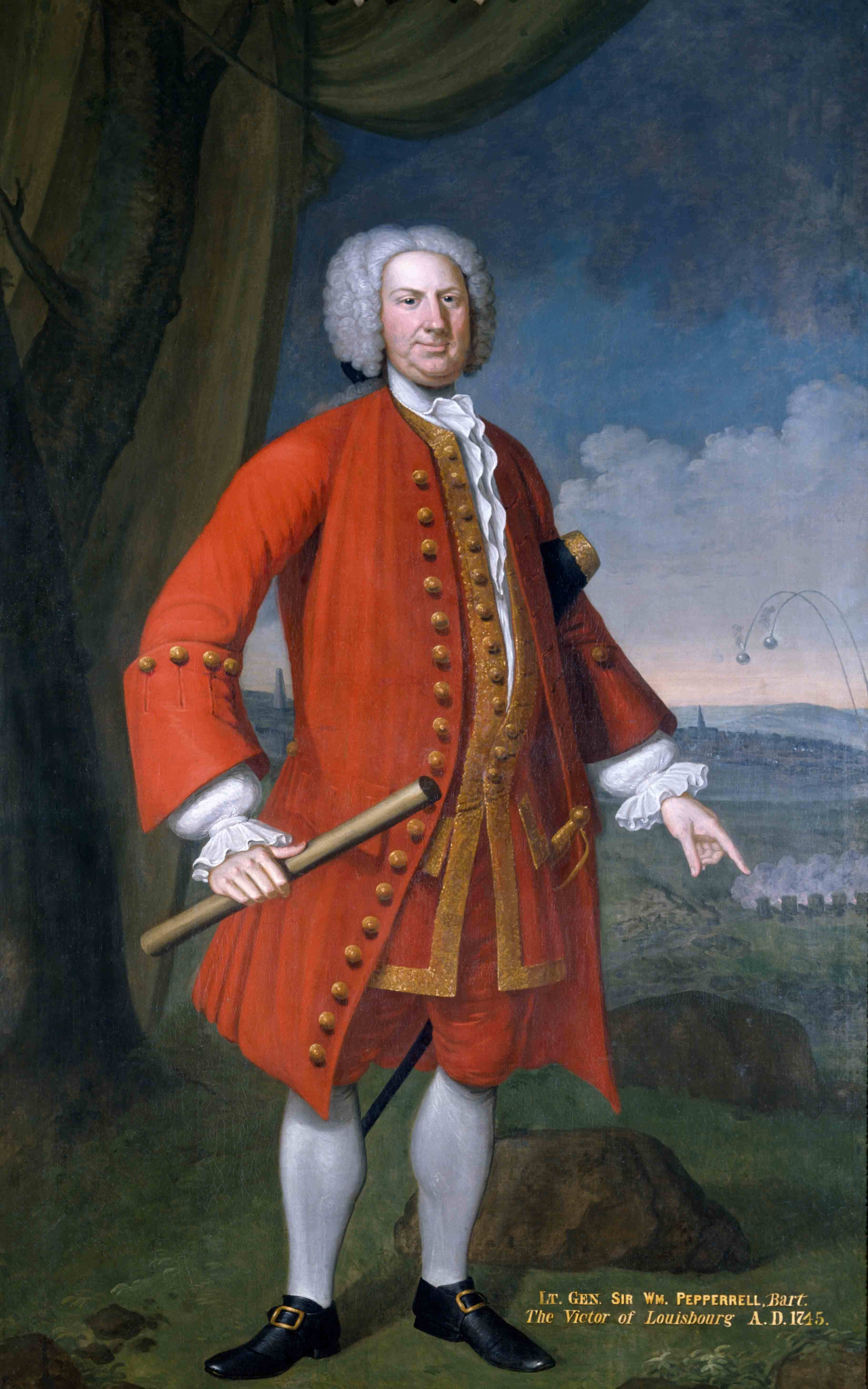
William Pepperrell's grandson William Pepperrell, died 1837, 34th Regiment of Foot

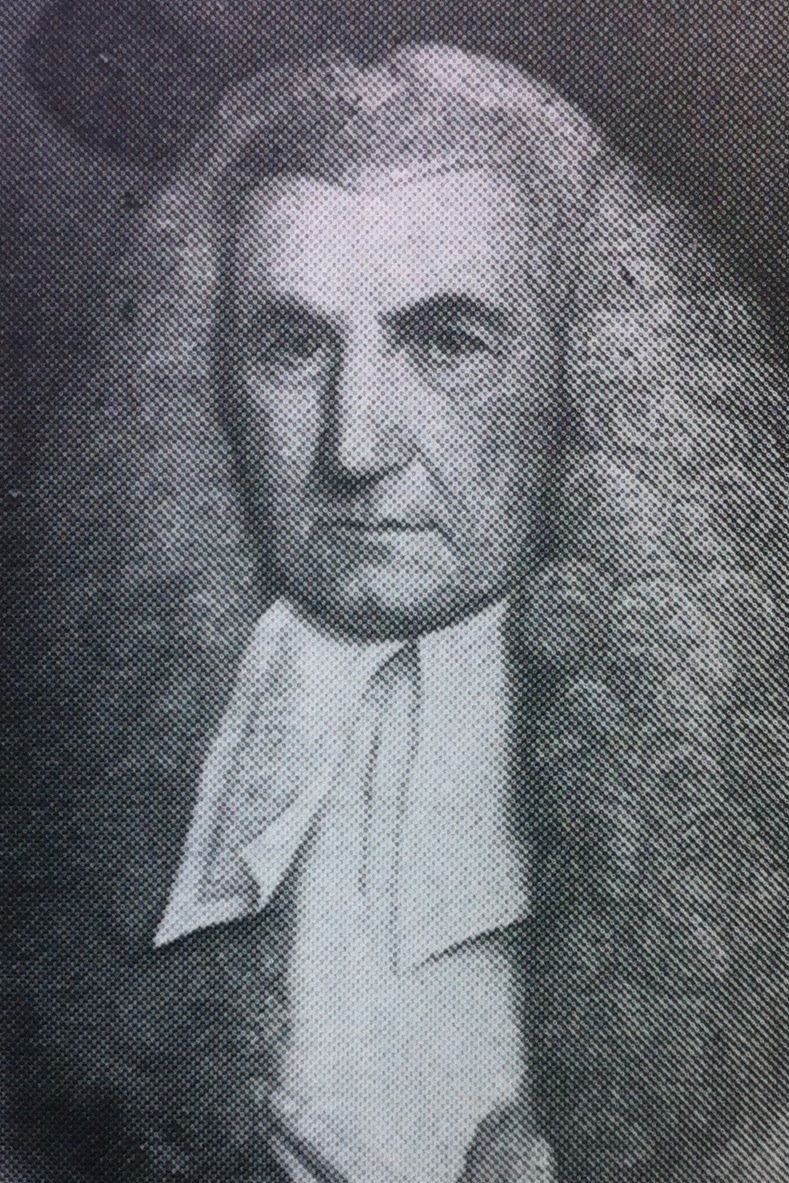
Chief Justice Sampson Salter Blowers, died 1842 – instrumental in ending slavery in Nova Scotia; son-in-law of Benjamin Kent

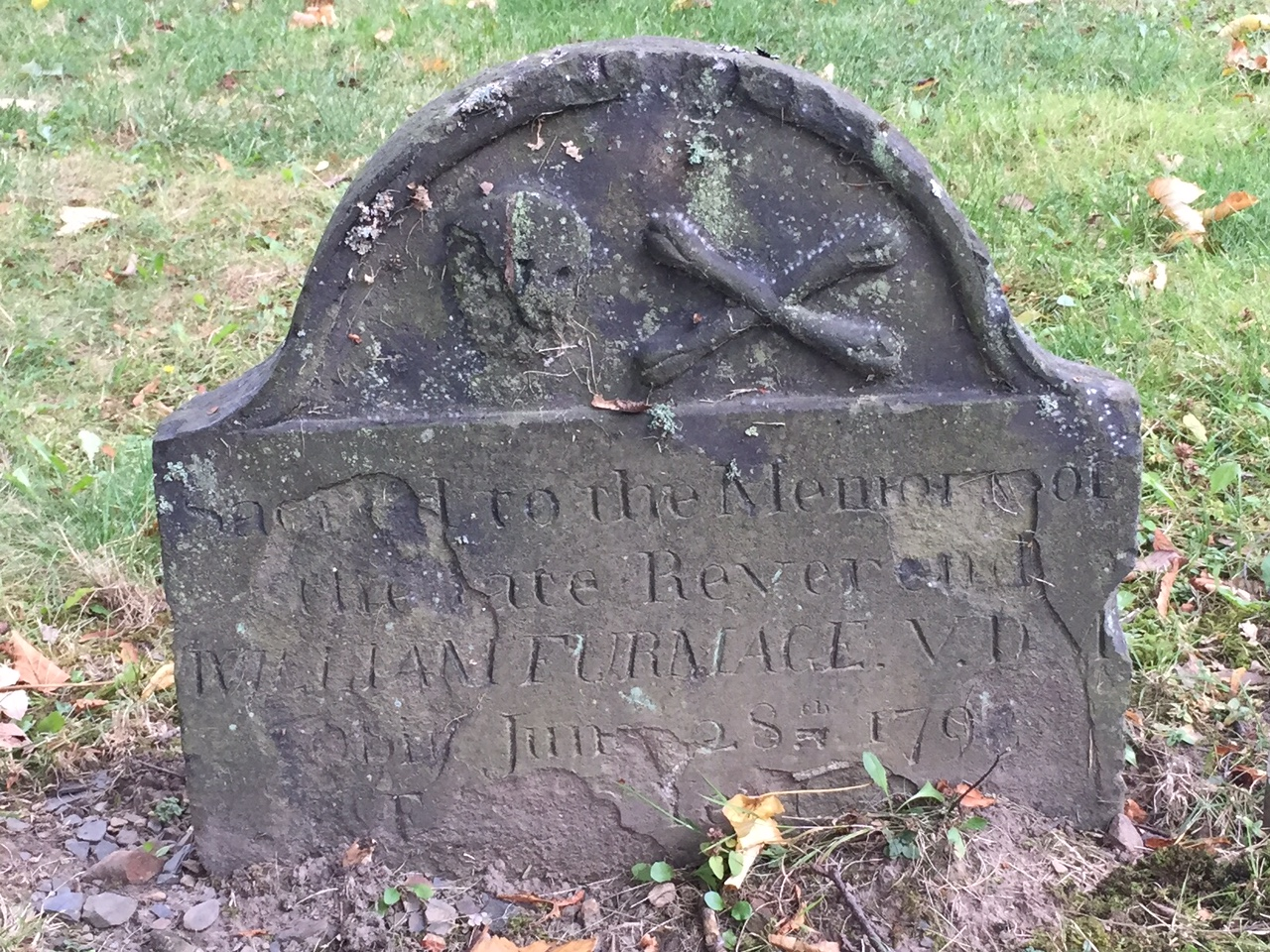
Reverend William Furmage (Firmage) (died 1793), Huntingdonian Missionary to the Black Loyalists; established first school for Black students in Halifax (1786)

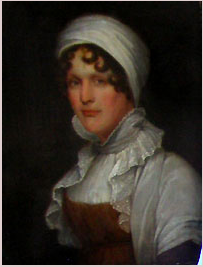
Rebecca Byles Almon, died 1852, wife of William James Almon (surgeon, Battle of Bunker Hill); oldest child of Mather Byles

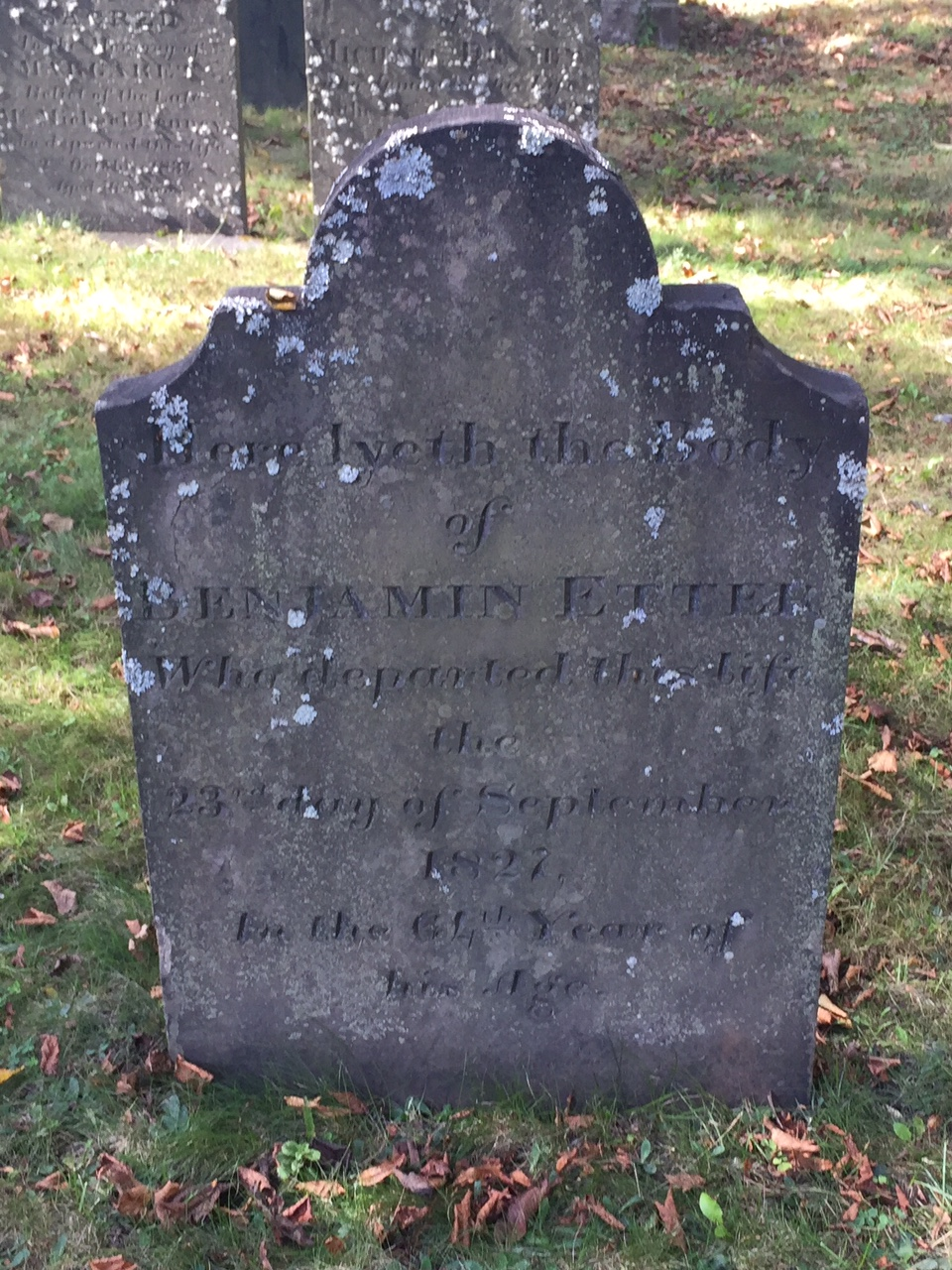
Benjamin Etter, silversmith
- Governor Paul Mascarene's grandchild William Handfield Snelling, died 1838
- Theophilus Lillie (died 26 May 1776), unmarked grave
- Byfield Lyde, (died 1776) unmarked grave
- John Lovell (loyalist) (died 17 July 1778), unmarked grave
- Christopher Minot (died 1783), unmarked grave
- George Brinley (died 1809), unmarked grave
- Jeremiah Dummer Rogers (died 1784), unmarked grave
- Archibald Cunningham (loyalist) (died 1820), unmarked grave
- Benning Wentworth (loyalist), died 1808 provincial secretary of Nova Scotia
- Capt. William Burton, 98th Regiment of Foot, died 1817 (Boston)
- Martha Howe, wife of John Howe, mother of Joseph Howe
- William Taylor, died 1810, a Boston merchant; father of James Taylor (Nova Scotia politician)
- Peter Lennox;
- Jonathan Sterns, died 1798, killed by Attorney General Richard John Uniacke
- Gilbert Stuart,
- Gregory Townsend
- William Burton (merchant) (c. 1748–1817)
- Sylvia (died 12 March 1824, age 70) black servant who resisted the American Privateers in the Raid on Lunenburg (1782)

==== Boston Patriot ====
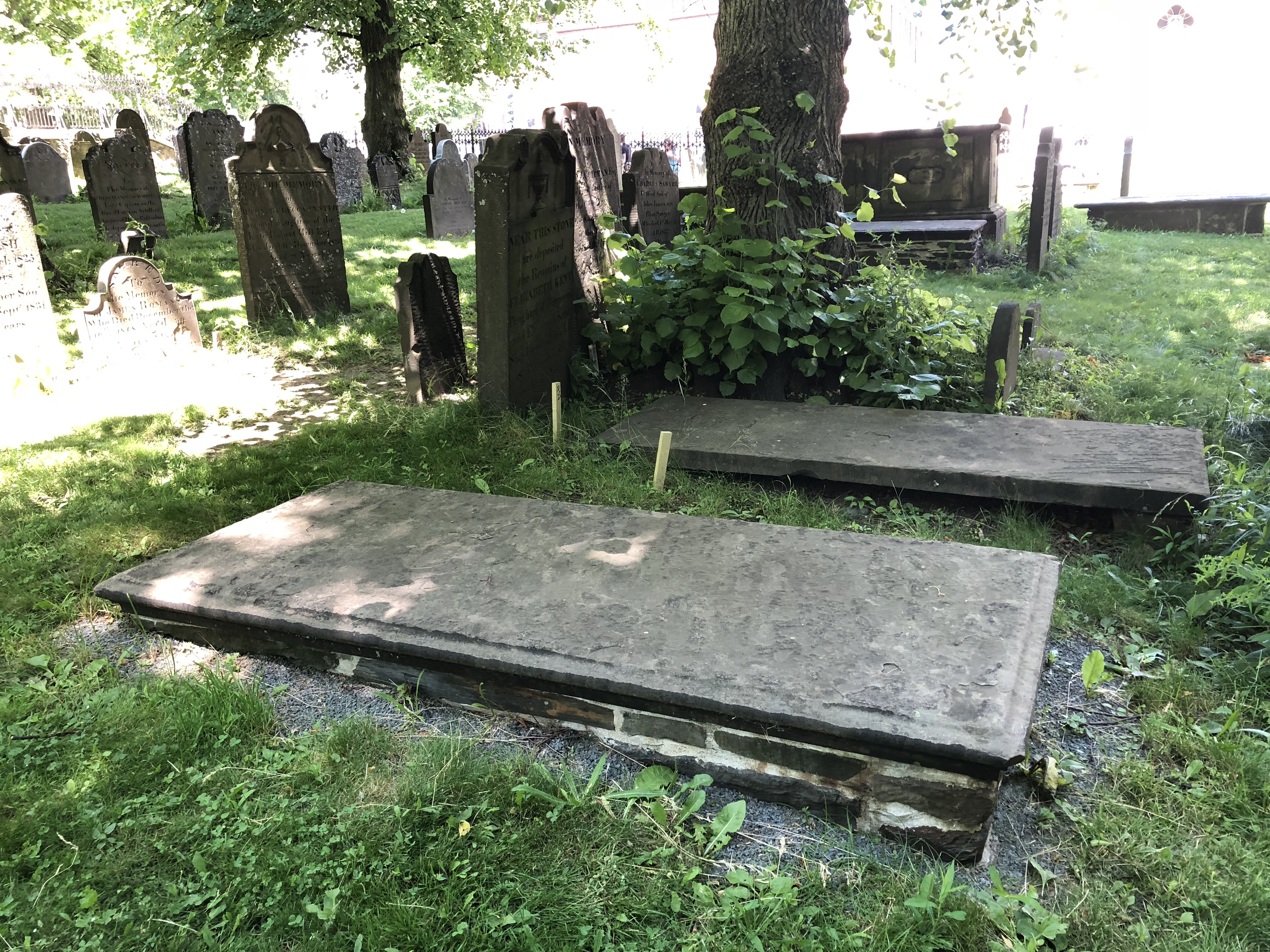
Benjamin Kent – lawyer who freed first slave in United States; First patriot Attorney General of Massachusetts

==== New York Loyalists ====
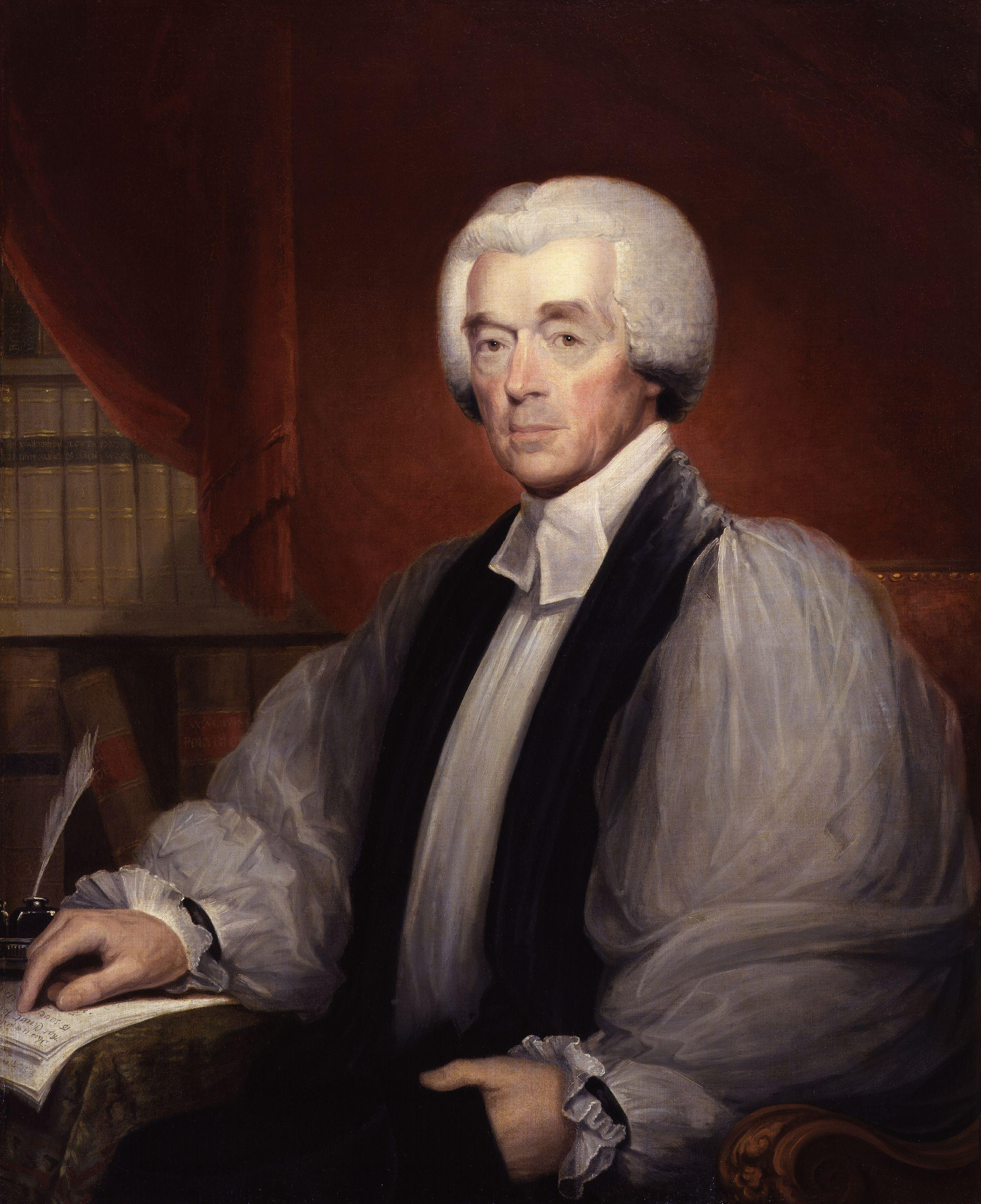
Bishop Charles Inglis' daughter Margaret (Inglis) Halliburton (and wife of Brenton Halliburton), advocated for education for Black Nova Scotians

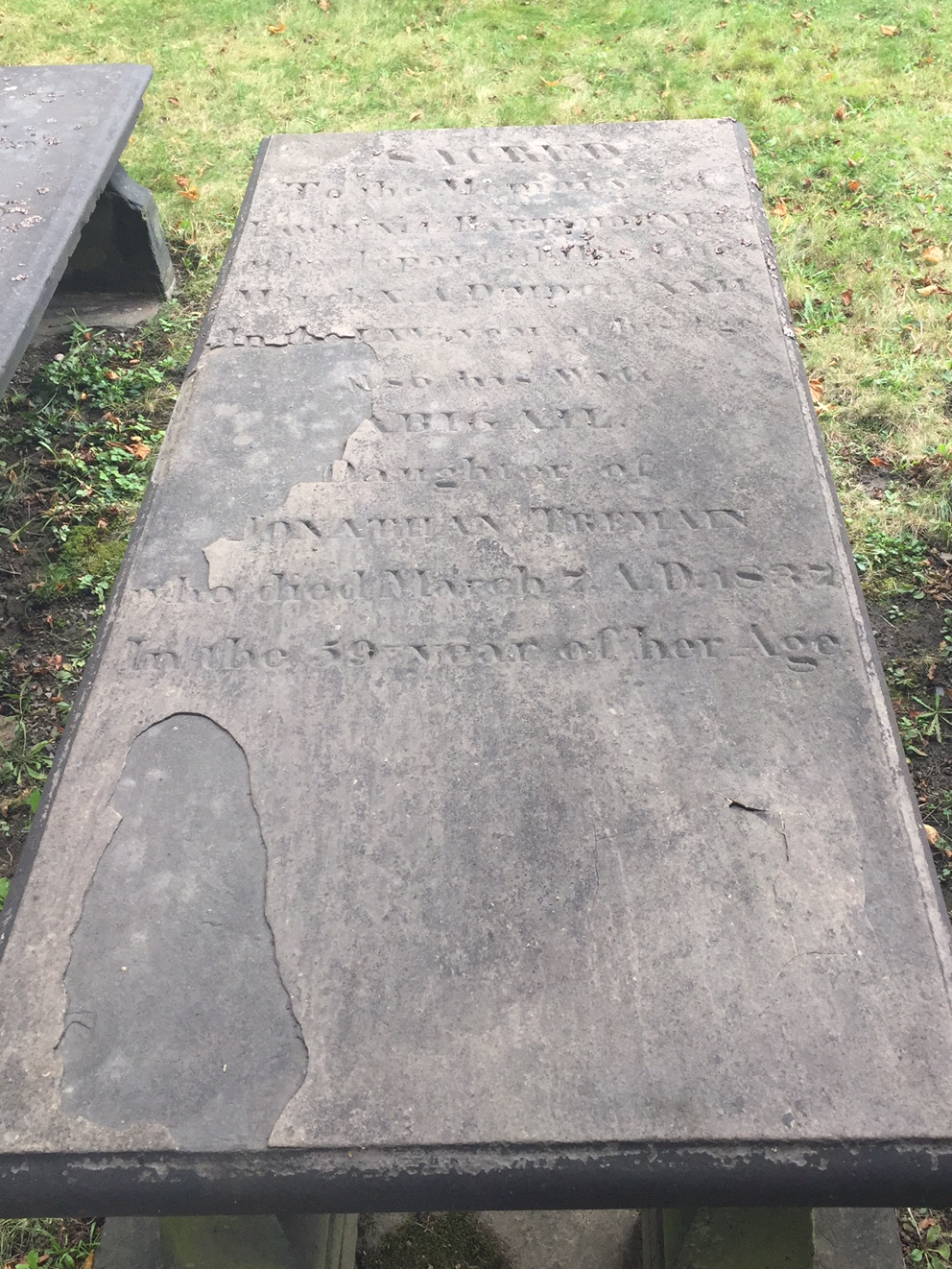
Lawrence Hartshorne, died 1822, a Quaker who was the chief assistant of John Clarkson (abolitionist) in helping the Black Nova Scotian Settlers emigrate to Sierra Leone (1792)

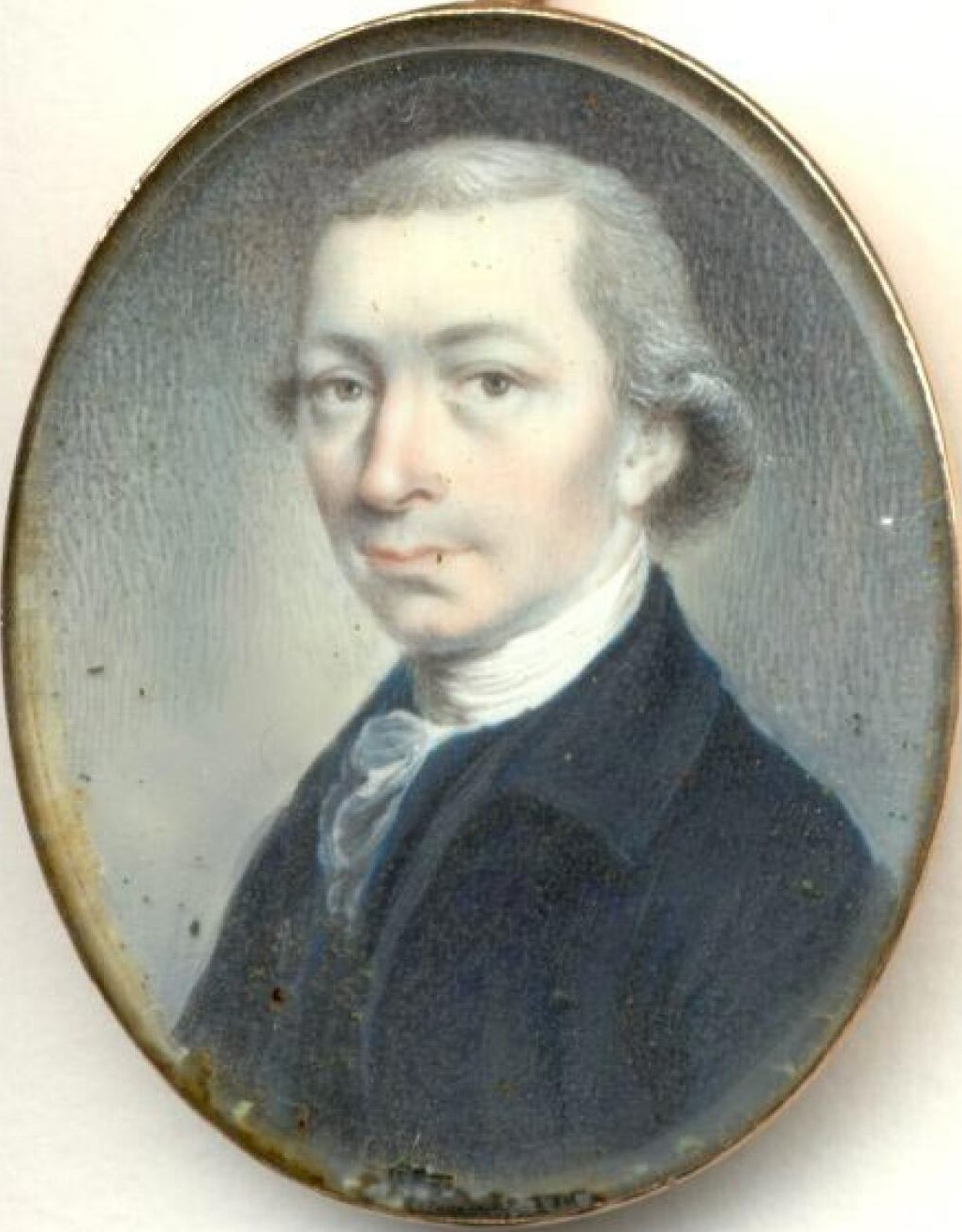
Jonathan Odell's daughter Lucy Anne

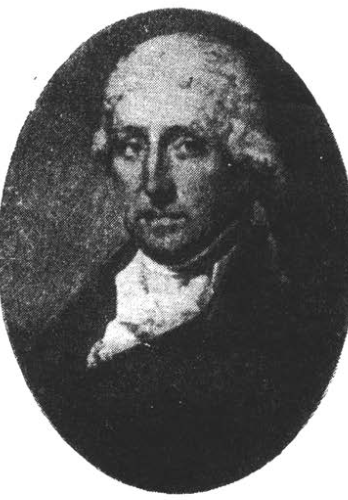
Dr. James Boggs (surgeon) – Prince Edward's surgeon
- Sarah Deblois, died 1827, Dr James Boggs' daughter-in-law
- Mary Young died 1784 (New York)
- Charles Geddes (merchant)
- Priscilla Ball, died 10 May 1791, Black servant, unmarked grave
- Daniel Bessonett

=== French Revolutionary Wars (1792–1802) ===
During the French Revolutionary Wars, Prince Edward was stationed in Halifax and personally commemorated four military personnel who died while on duty in Halifax.

==== Prince Edward Commemorations ====
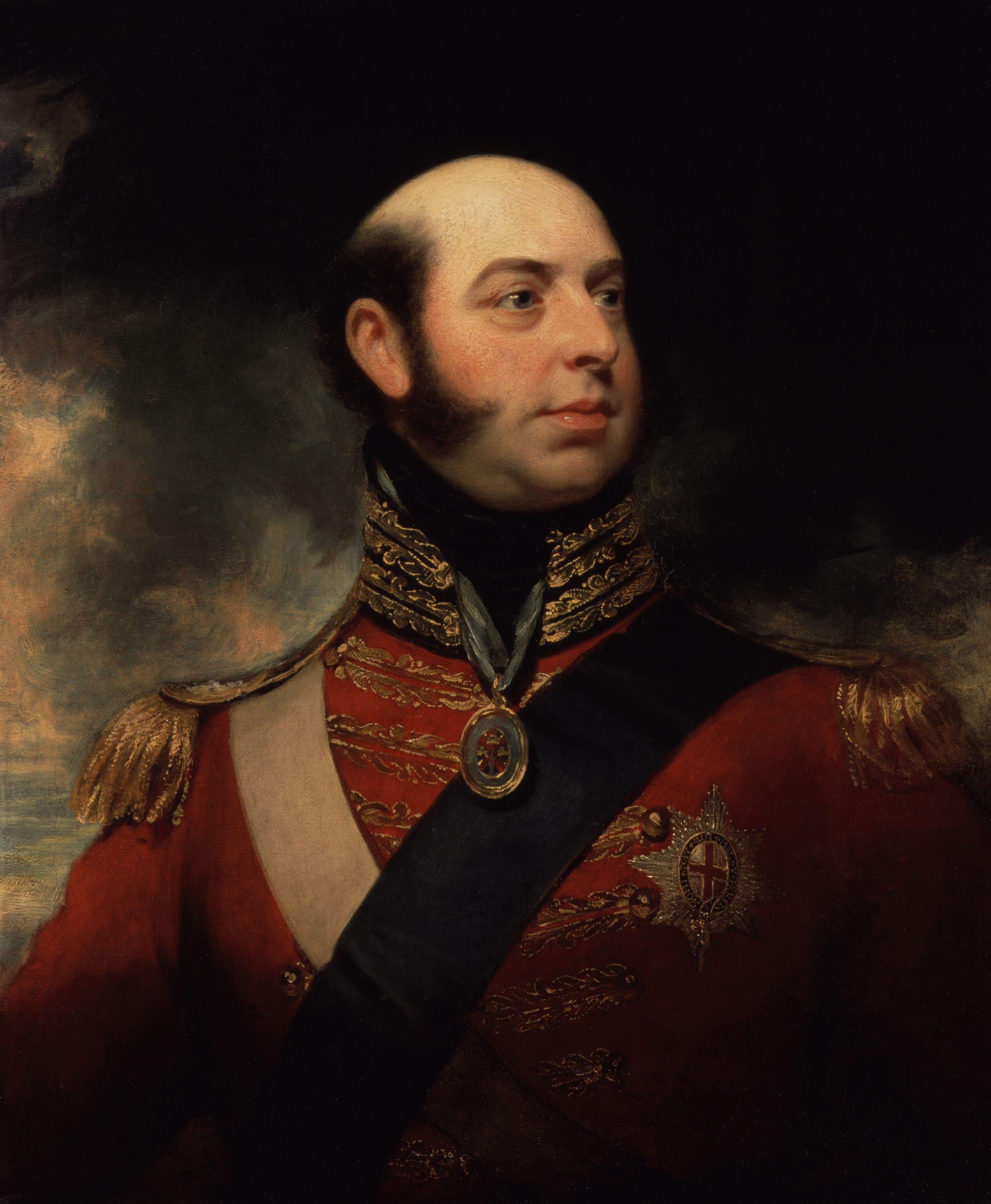
Prince Edward

- Lt. Benjamin James, Royal Nova Scotia Regiment, died while trying to rescue those who died aboard HMS Tribune (1797);
- Major Charles Domville, Royal Rifles, Dec. 1797, 7th Regiment (at Halifax from 1796 till 1799), Major 16 September 1795, died January 1798.
- Charles Thomas, H.M. 7th Royal Fusiliers regiment, died from friendly fire; (son of Nathaniel Thomas, Loyalist)
- James Brace Sutherland (c.1782 – September 25, 1798), son of Captain Andrew Sutherland; a midshipman who died in storm, age 16, in Halifax harbour on board HMS Prevoyante
- Benjamin Etter – Prince Edward's honorary aide-de-camp
- Dr. James Boggs (surgeon) – Prince Edward's surgeon

==== Other ====
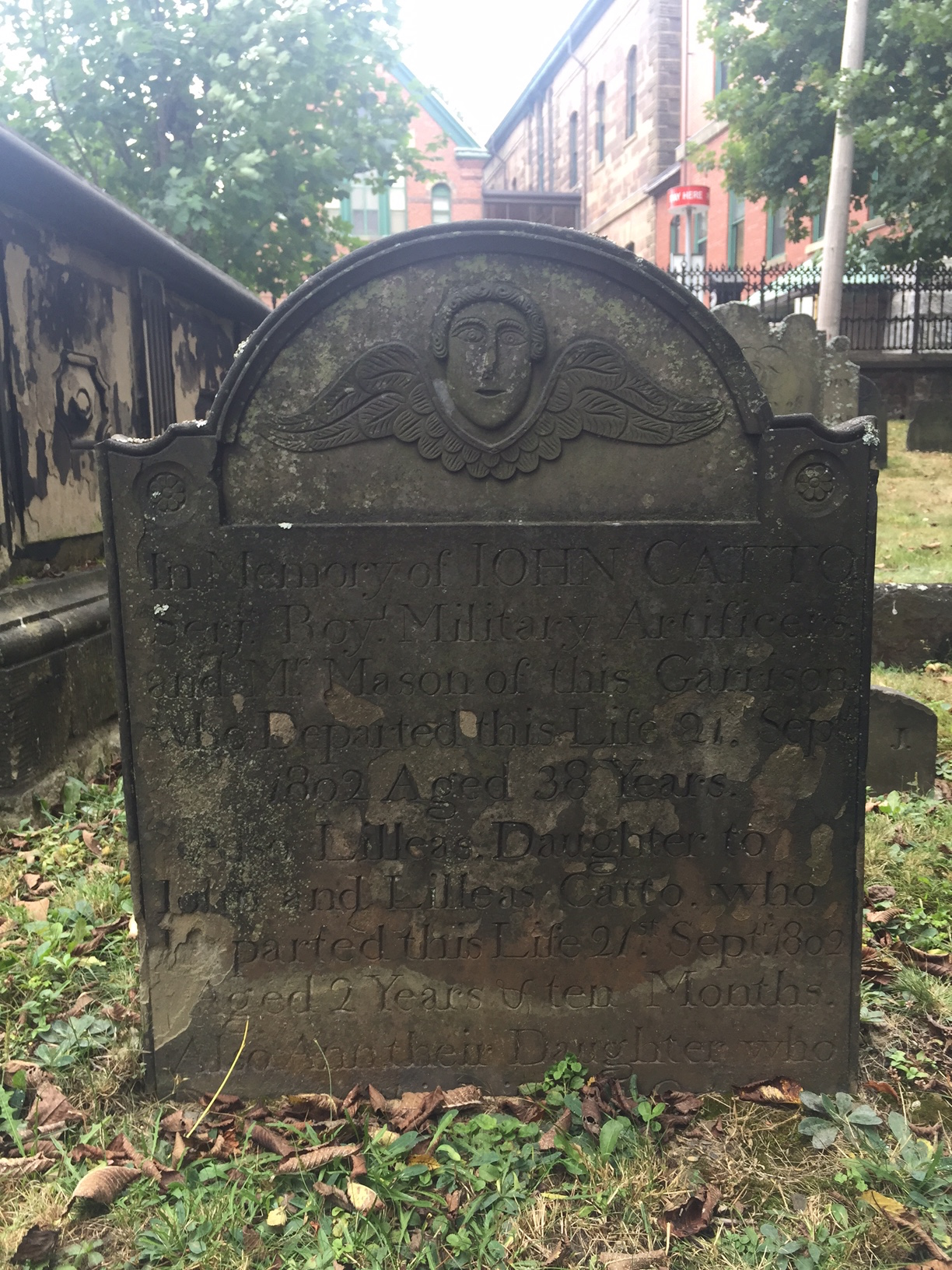
Serg. John Catto Soldier Artificer Company and Mr. Mason of Halifax Garrison, died 1802

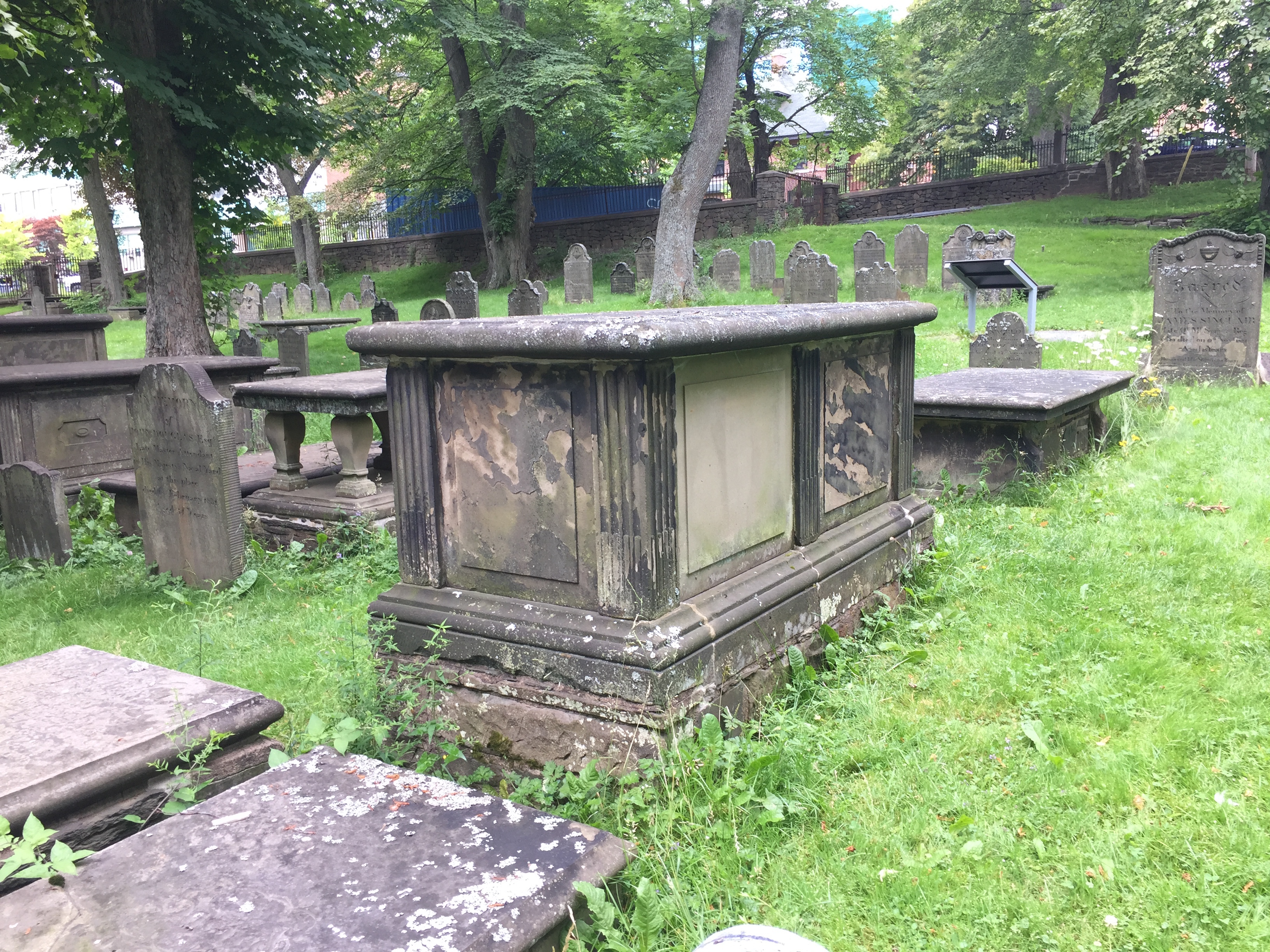
Lt. Col. Thomas Huxley (military officer)

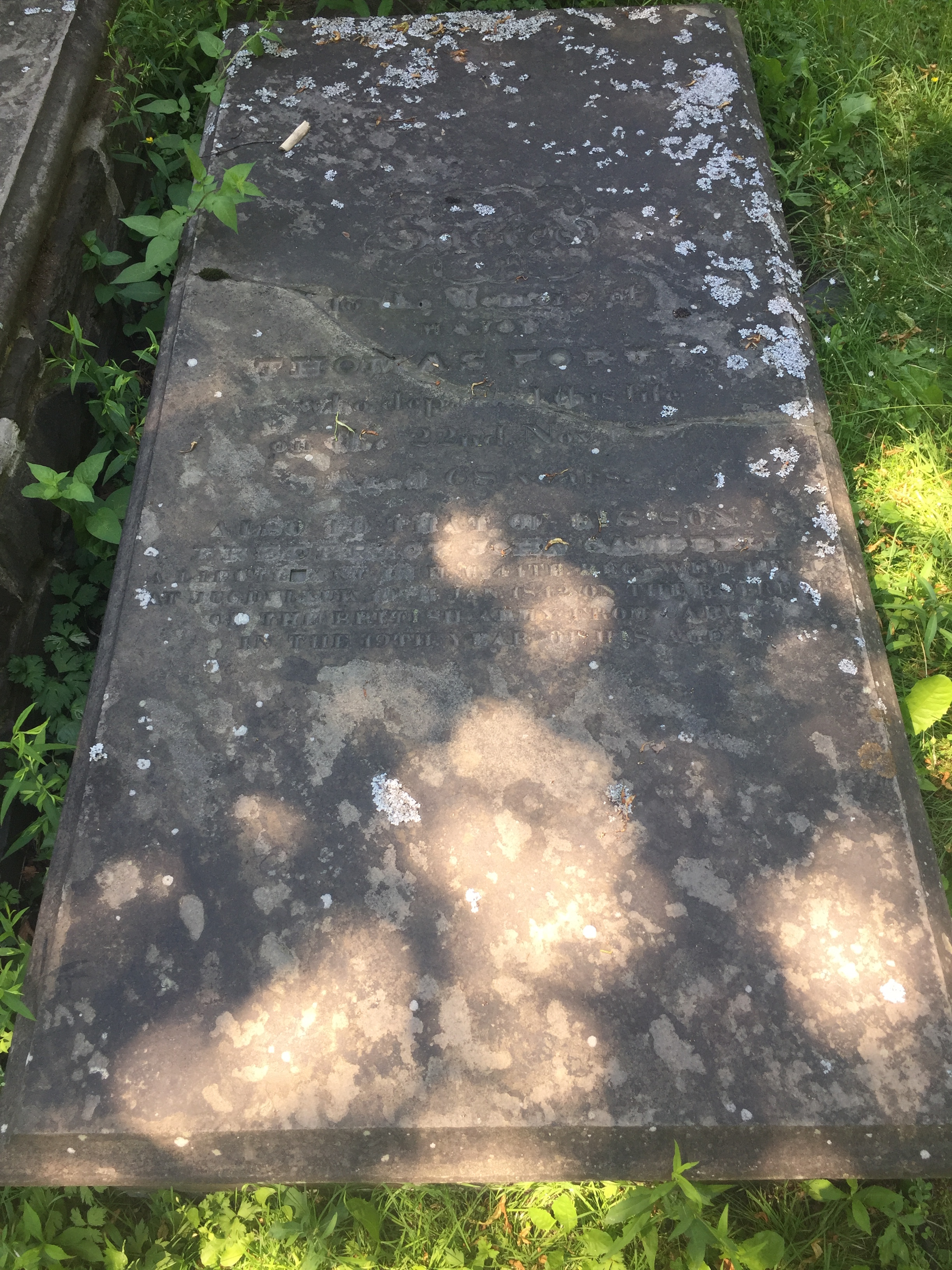
Major Thomas Fortye

=== Napoleonic Wars (1803–1815) ===
==== Battle of Trafalgar ====
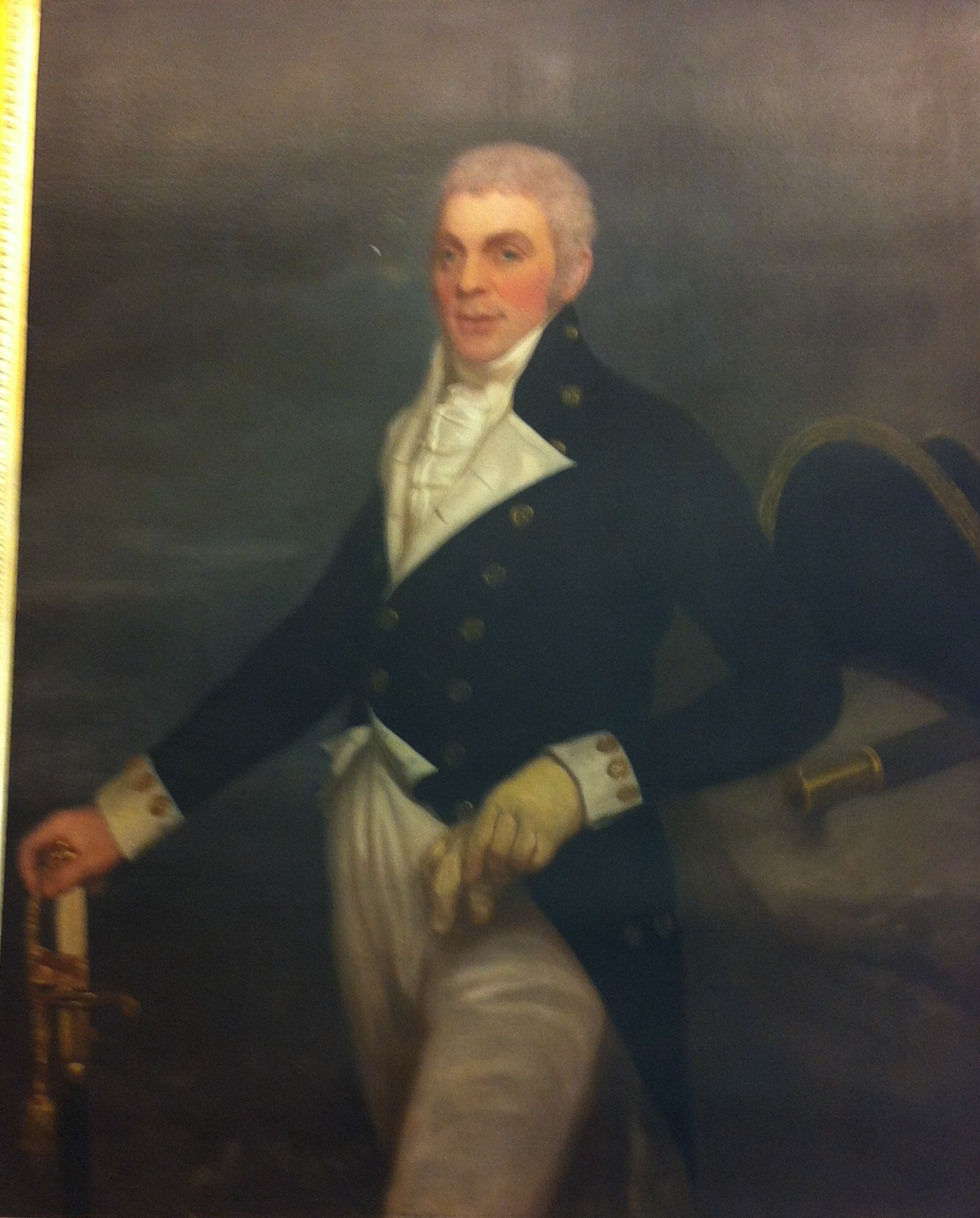
John Houlton Marshall's mother Mary (died 1813) and brother Benjamin (died 1825), John's Portrait in Province House (Nova Scotia)

==== Peninsular War ====
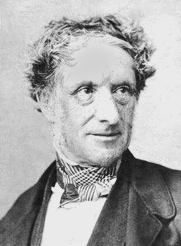
Sir Richard Westmacott's brother Architect John Westmacott, died 1816; He was wounded in the Siege of Badajoz (1812); Richard reported to have created several marble mantles in Government House

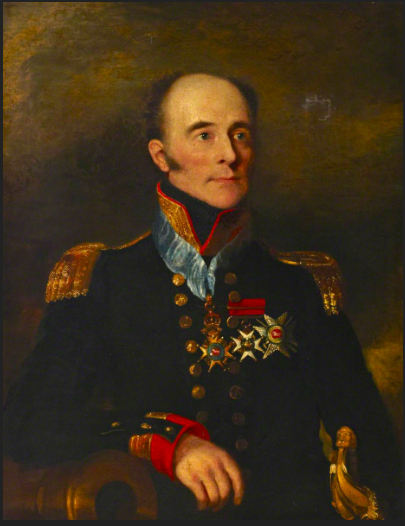
Commodor Sir Thomas Ussher's wife Eliza Ussher, died 1835, Thomas conveyed Napoleon Bonaparte into exile to Elba (1814).

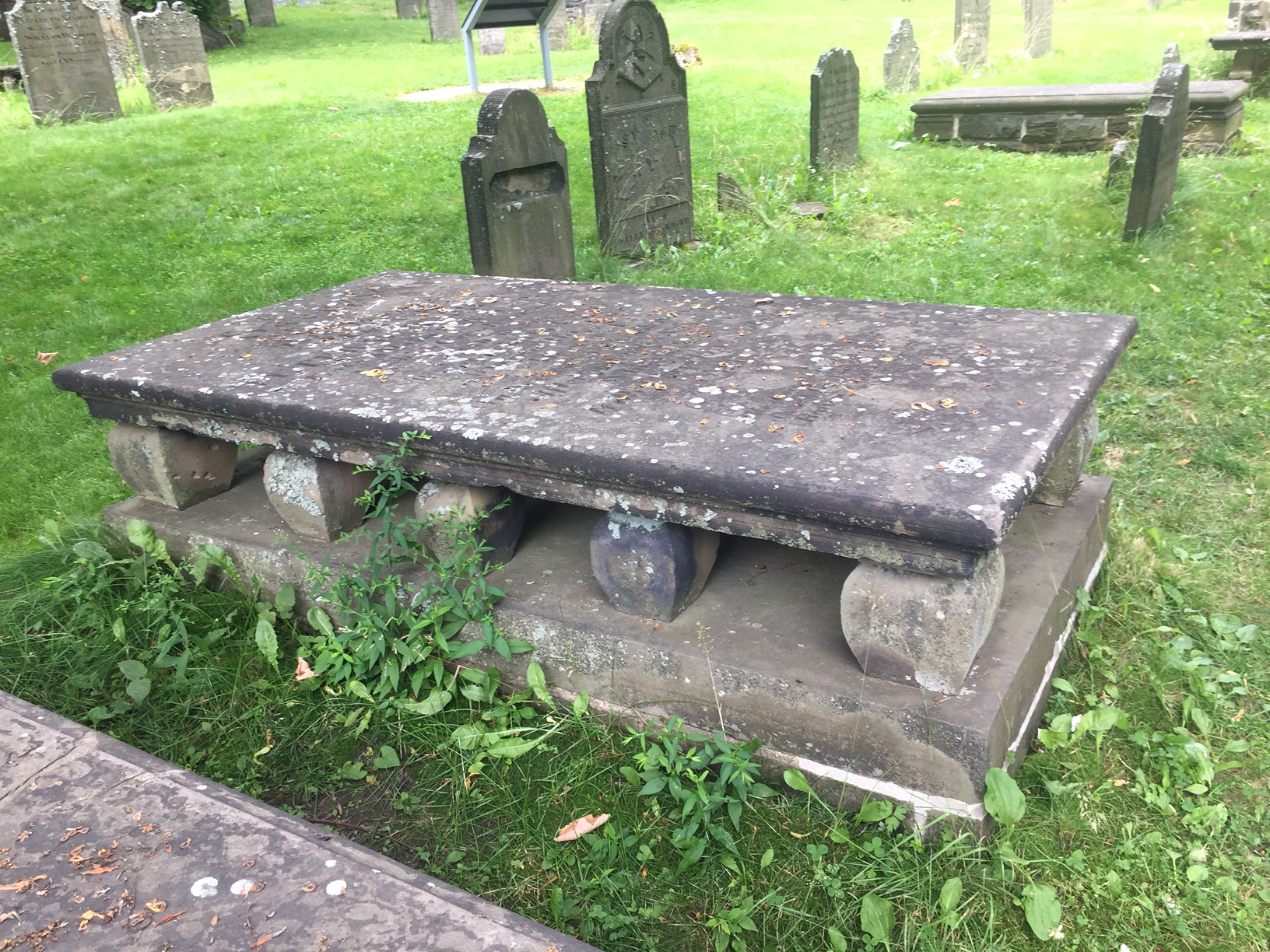
Peter Waterhouse
- Major James Butler, 62nd Regiment He fought under the command of Sir Samuel Hulse in the Peninsular War

==== War of 1812 ====
Major-General Robert Ross (British Army officer), died 12 September 1814 leading troops during the Battle of Baltimore.

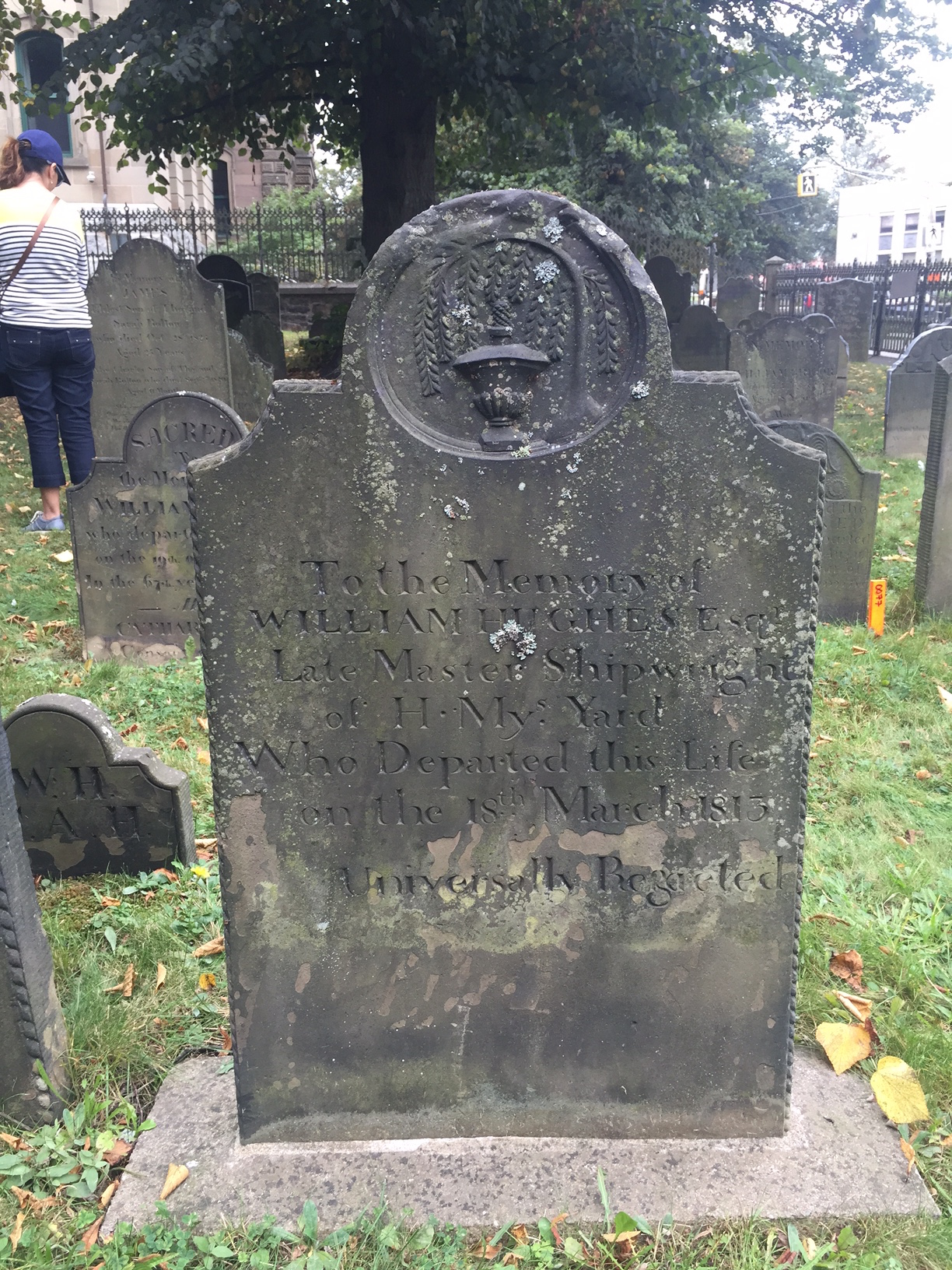
William Hughes, died 1813, Master Shipwright, HM Dockyard; assisted Prince Edward in the design of St. George's Round Church

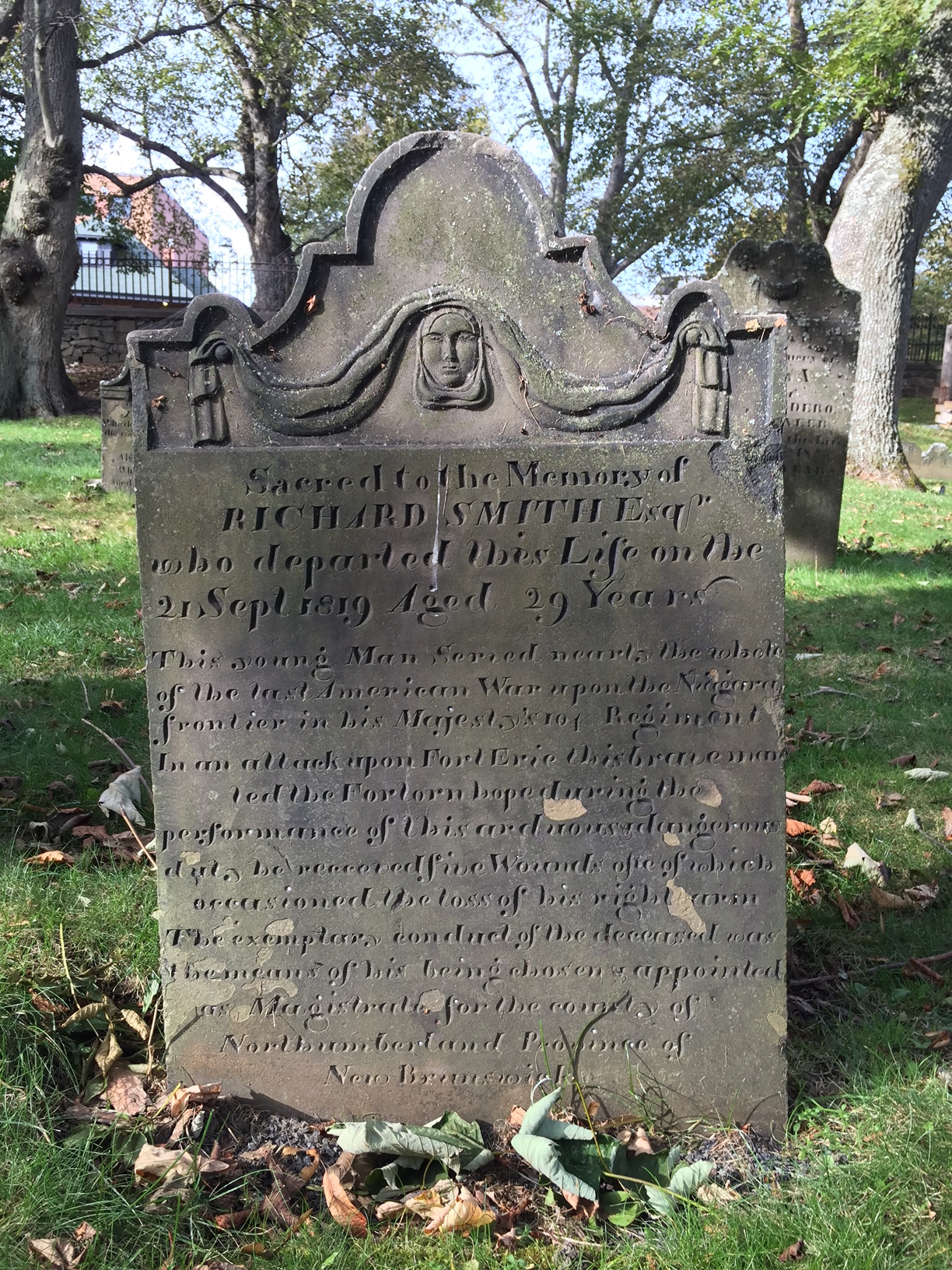
Sgt. Richard Smith, 104th (New Brunswick) Regiment of Foot; made the 600 men march from Fredericton, N.B., to Kingston, Ont. between February and April 1813; wounded five times in the Battle of Fort Erie, 1814

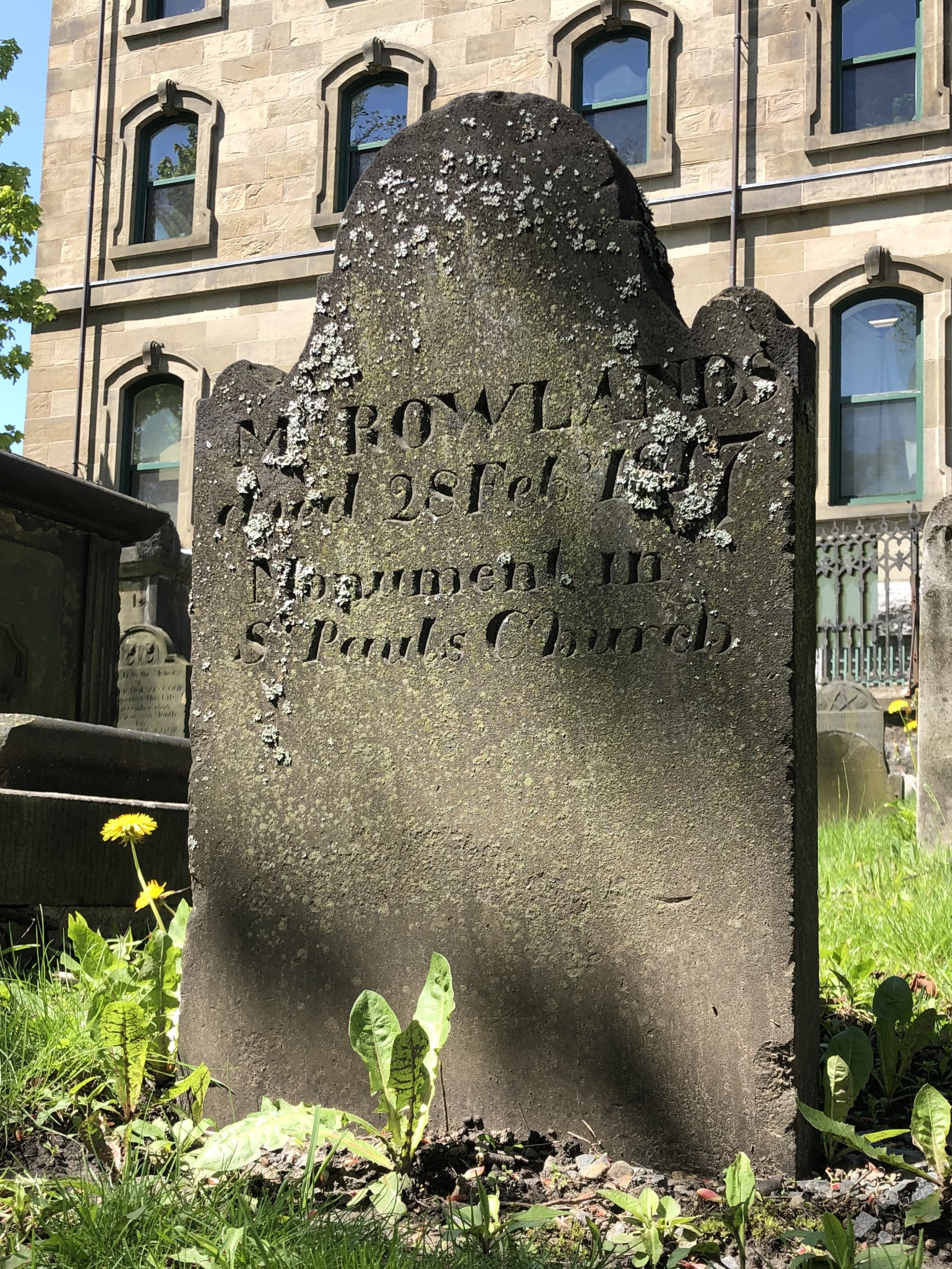
Esther Rowlands, wife of Dr. David Rowlands (surgeon), the naval surgeon for patients of HMS Shannon (1813) (plaque in St. Paul's church)
- Lieut, Col. John-Fowell (J.F.) Goodridge, 62nd Regiment of Foot (January 1768 – 12 November 1819) – monument erected by the 62nd in his memory; buried his 2-year-old in Halifax who died in fire
- William Ross, died 1822, Nova Scotia Fencibles; founder of Ross Farm, Lunenburg County, Nova Scotia, unmarked grave

===== Privateers =====
- Captain Benjamin Ellenwood, died 1815, murdered
- Captain Ebenezer Herrington, died 1812, HMS Chub, friendly fire

==== Battle of Waterloo ====
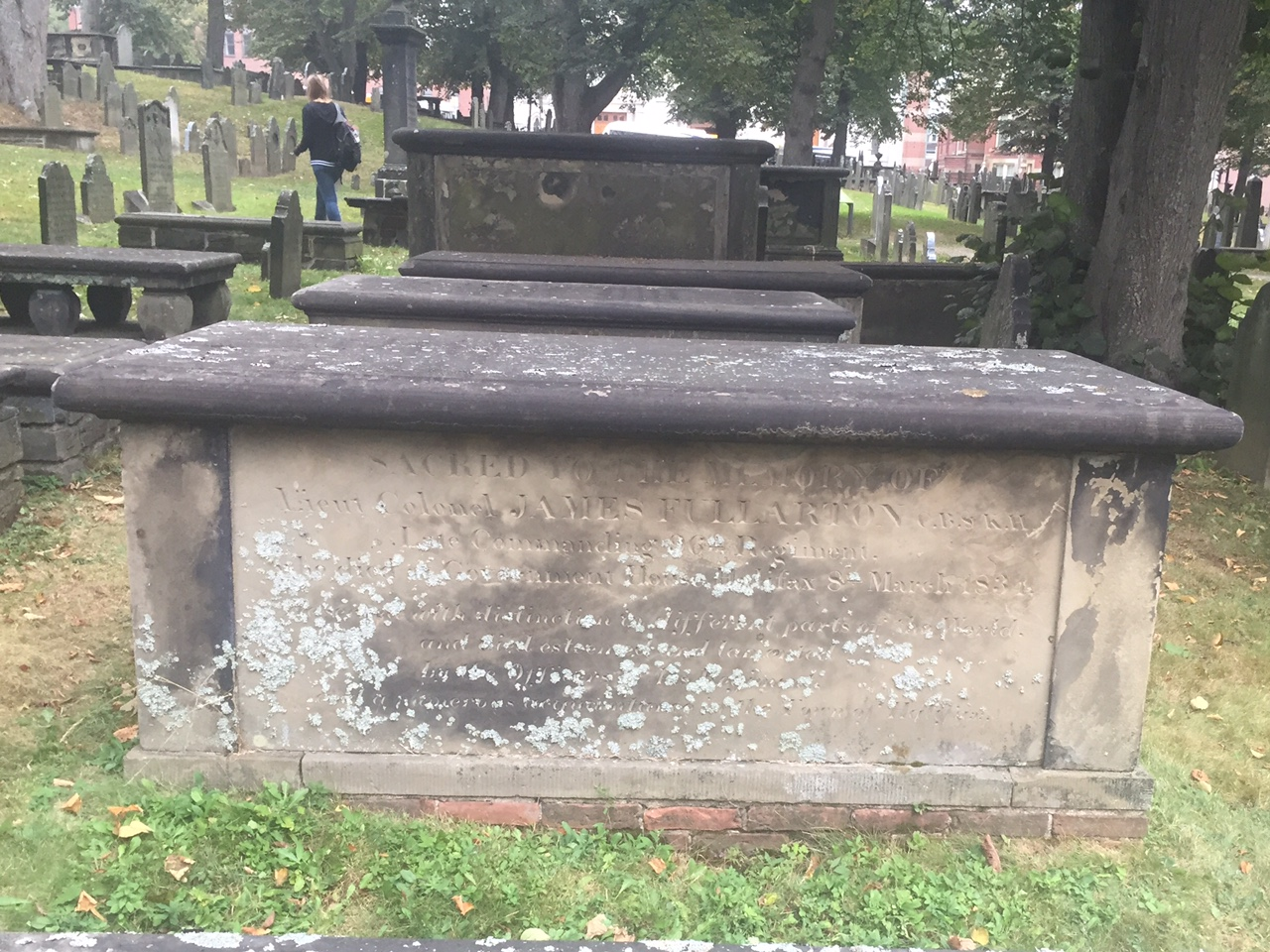
Lt. Col James Fullarton, died 1834, Battle of Waterloo

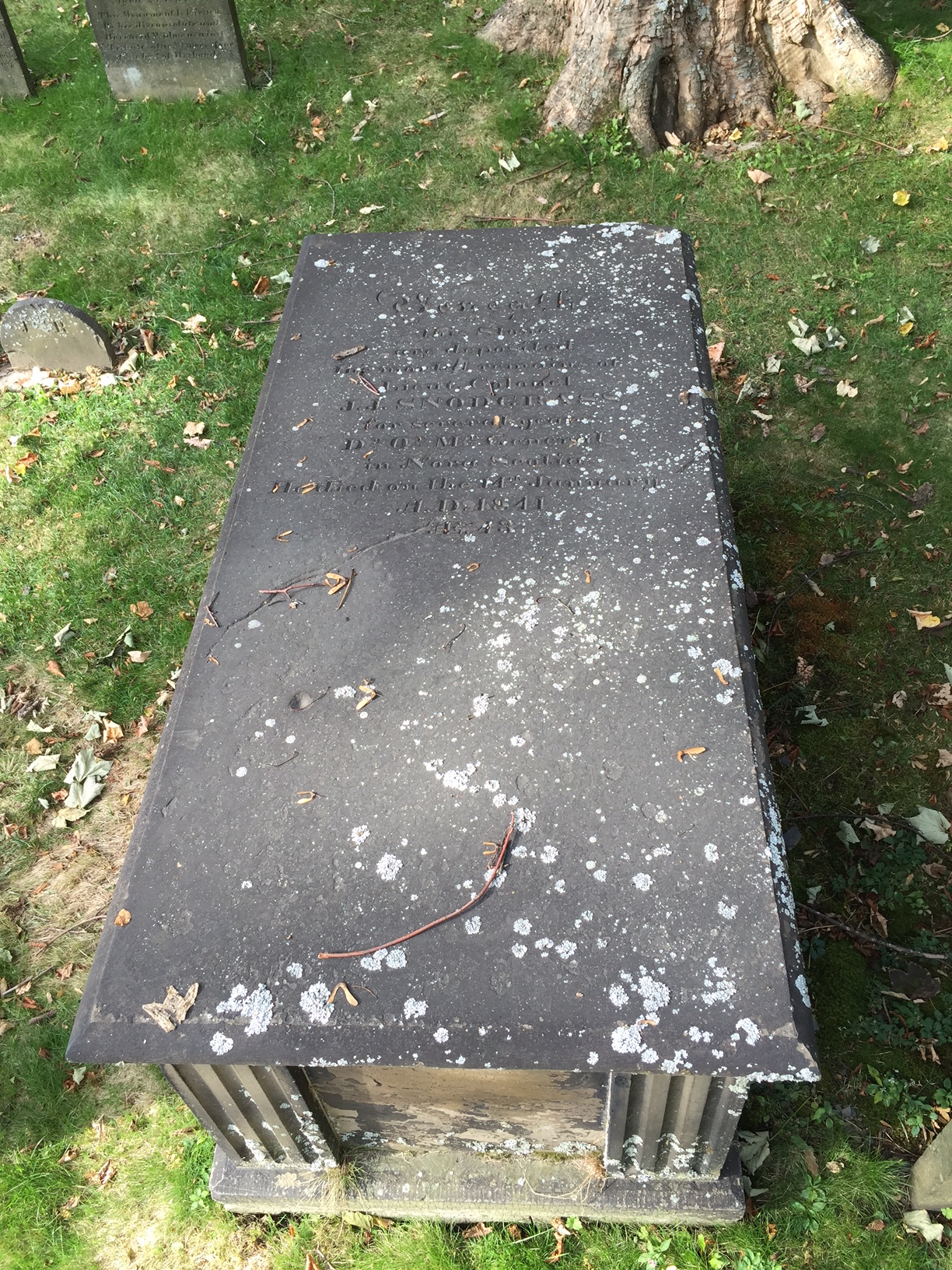
Lt. Col John James Snodgrass, died 1841, Battle of Waterloo

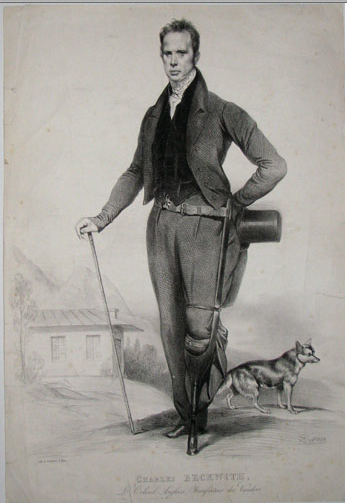
Lt. Col. John Beckwith's (infant) siblings; lost his leg in the Battle of Waterloo
- Lieut. William Johnson Thornhill, 03 Jan. 1812 99th (Prince of Wales's Tipperary) Regiment of Foot – His Commander James Orde was court marshalled in Halifax for abusing his soldiers.

=== Military Officers (1816–1844) ===
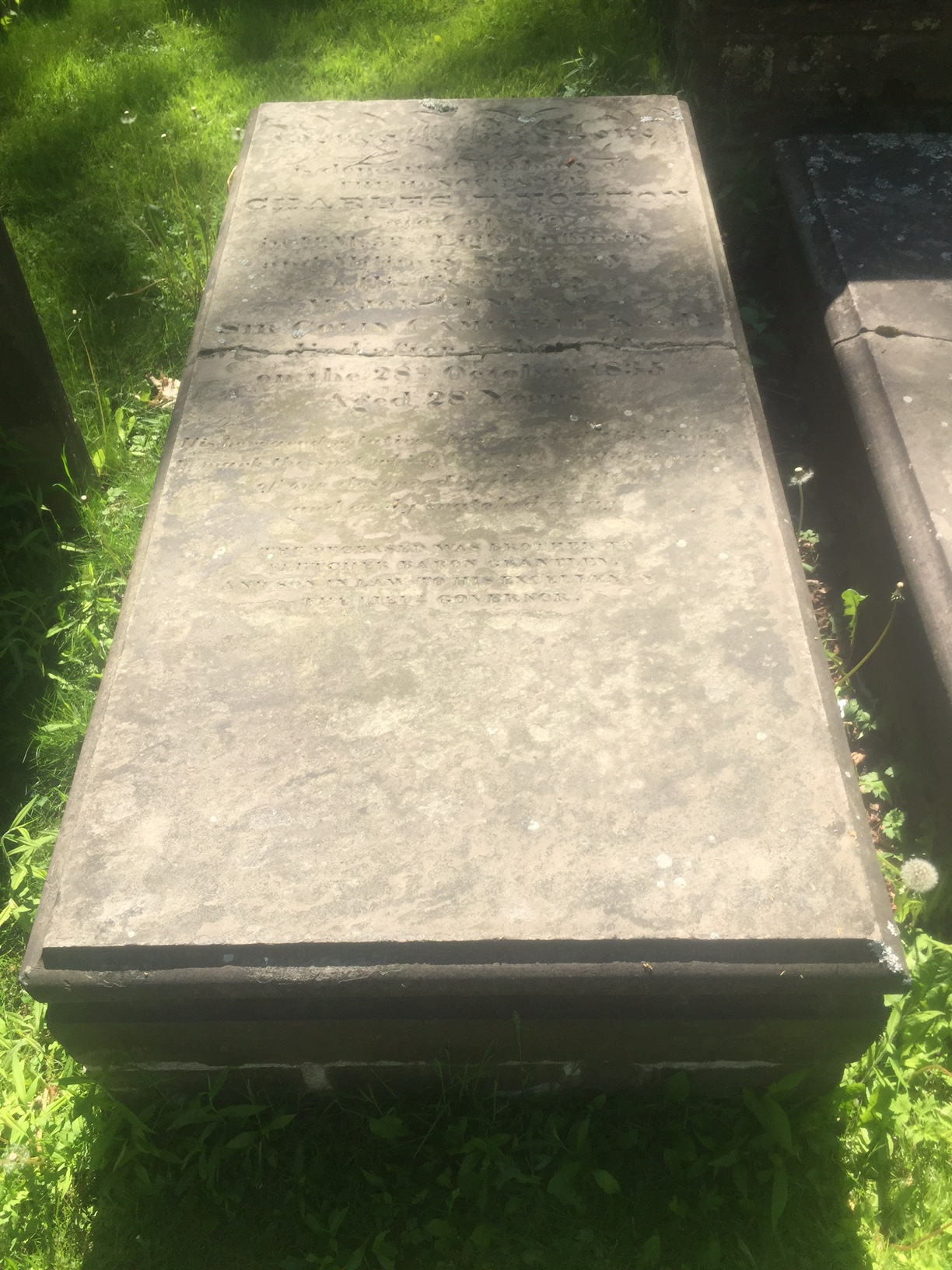
Charles Francis Norton died 1835; son-in-law of Sir Colin Campbell; brother-in-law of writer Caroline Norton
- Hon. William Cropton, died 1838, (2C) 85th Infantry; Brother to Baron Crofton, The Crofton Baronetcy, of Mohill in the County of County Leitrim (Plaque in St. Paul's)
- Commander John George Dewar, HMS Rose. died 1830 (also plaque in St. Paul's church) Plaque also in North Middleton churchyard
- John Thompson, Surgeon, HMS Saracen, died 1818
- Serg William George, 74th (Highland) Regiment of Foot, died 1828
- William Pepperell, Quarter Master of the 34th Regiment of Foot, died 1837
- Elizabeth Pepperrell, wife of William Pepperrell the younger
- Col Sgt. John Reilly, 64th (2nd Staffordshire) Regiment of Foot, died 1842
- John Ross, R.N., died 1844
- Lieut. Charles A. Ross, R.N., died 1828
- Lieut. James Philips, RN, died 1821
- Westmount, Capt. John 4 May 1816, Royal Staff Corps

=== Other ===
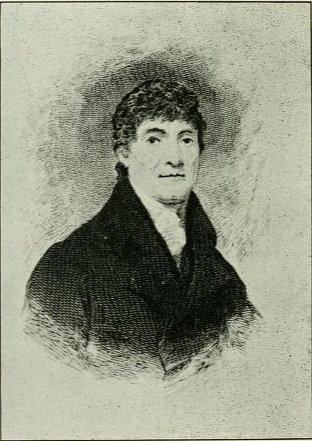
John Gillespie, died 1772, 1st president of North British Society

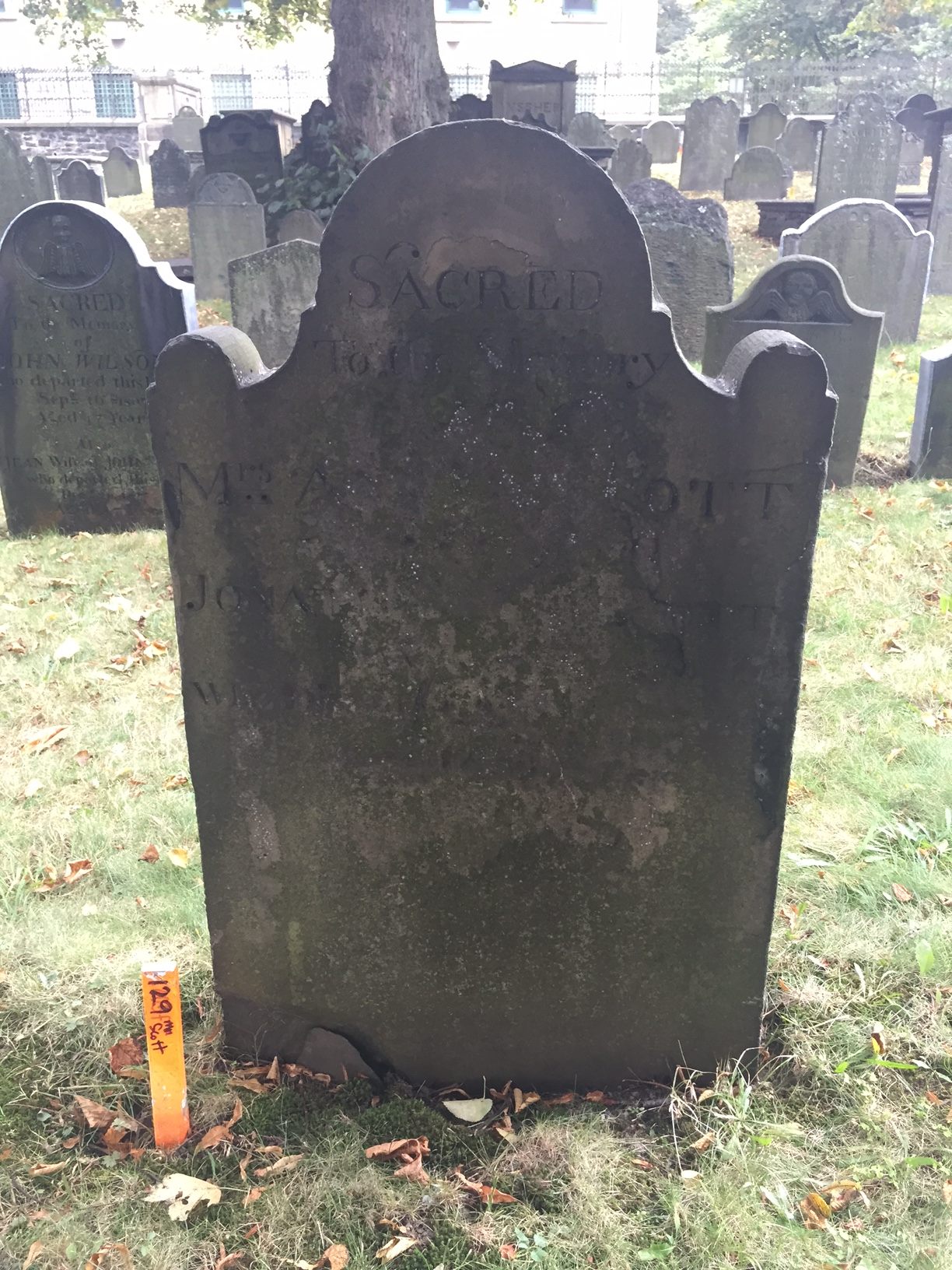
Ann Scott (died 1776), midwife, gravestone: "She will be greatly missed by the people of Halifax"

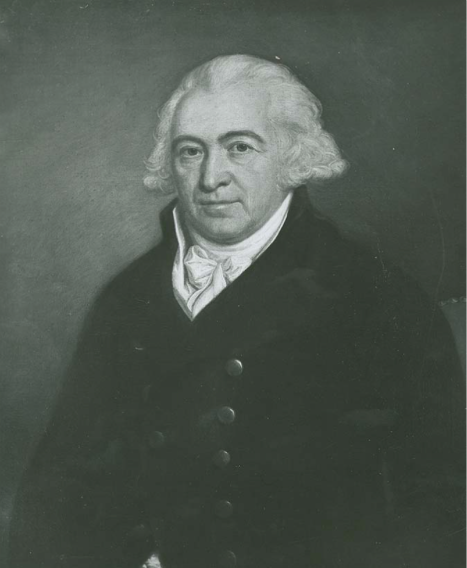
Hon Thomas Cochran, died 1801, and his family. (St. Matthew's)

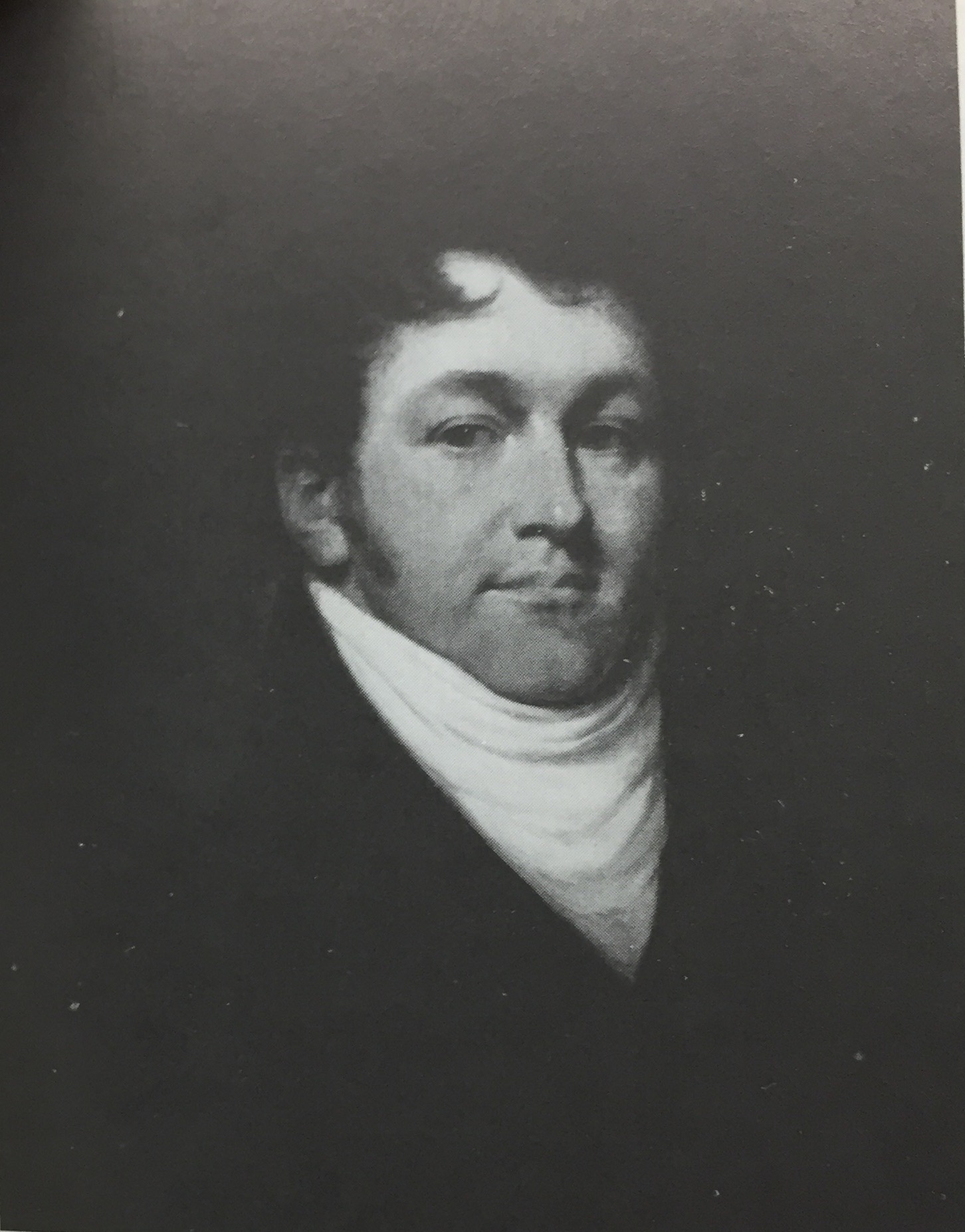
William Bowie (merchant), died 1819, (killed by Richard John Uniacke Jr. in the last duel in Nova Scotia)

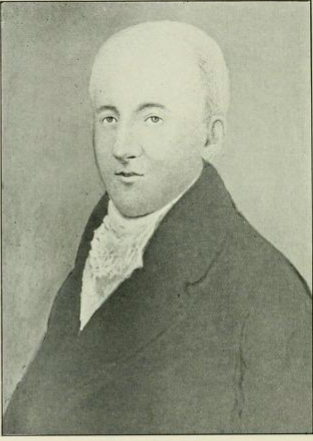
Hon James Fraser, died 1822

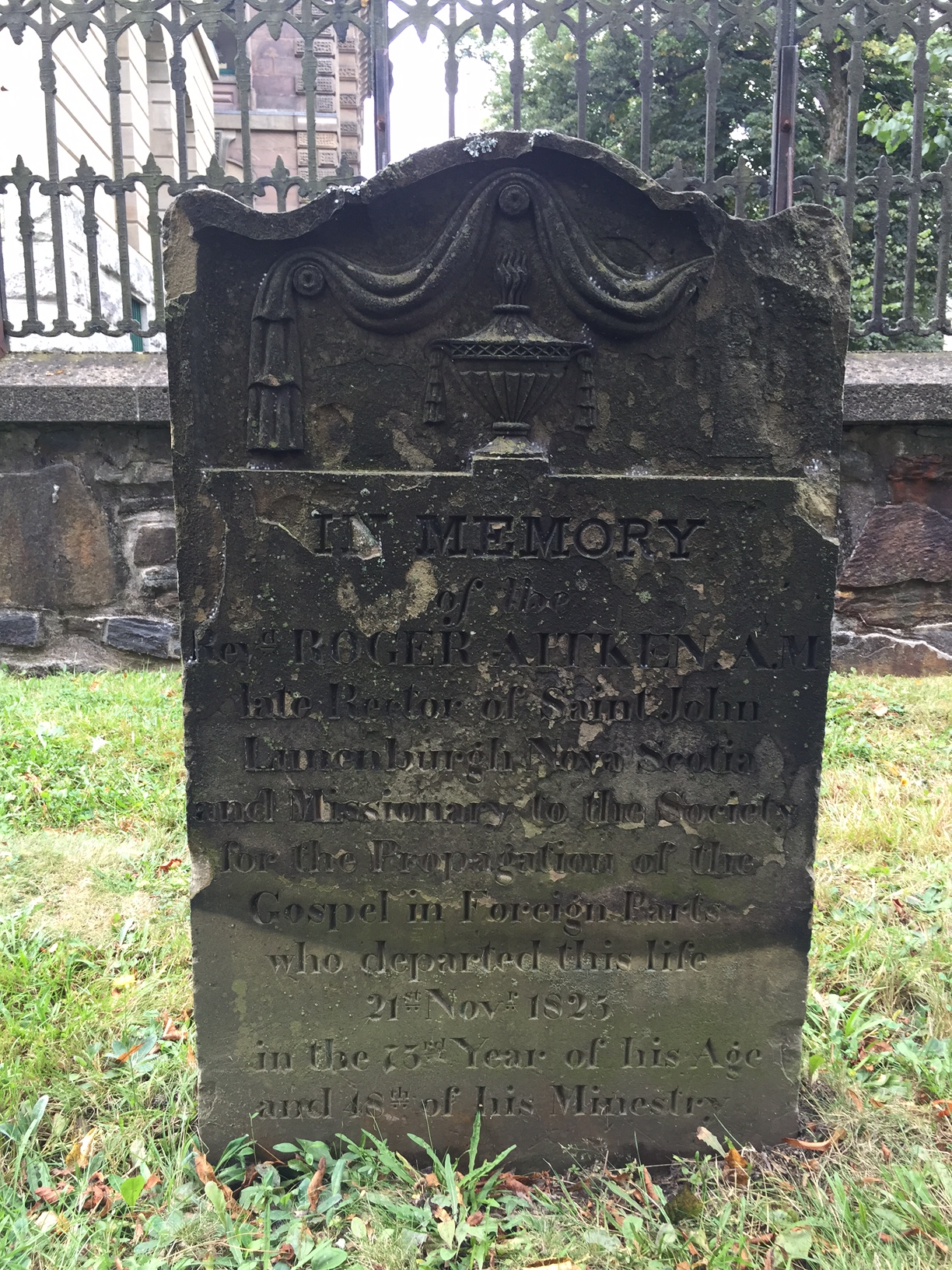
Rev. Roger Aitken (died 1825), missionary at Lunenburg for Society for the Propagation of the Gospel in Foreign Parts (SPG), St. John's Anglican Church (Lunenburg)

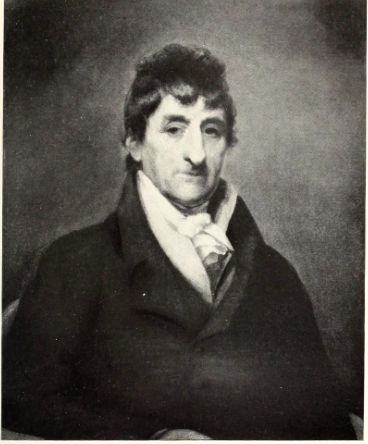
John Lawson, died 1828, father of William Lawson, first president of the Bank of Nova Scotia

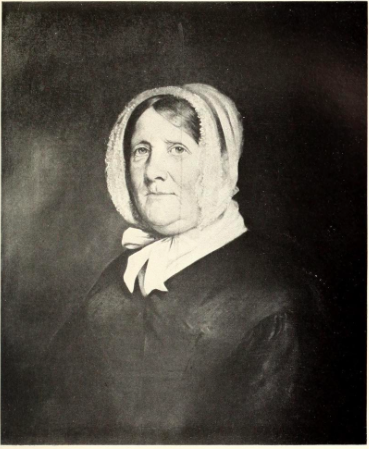
2nd Elizabeth Lawson, died 1819, wife of John Lawson

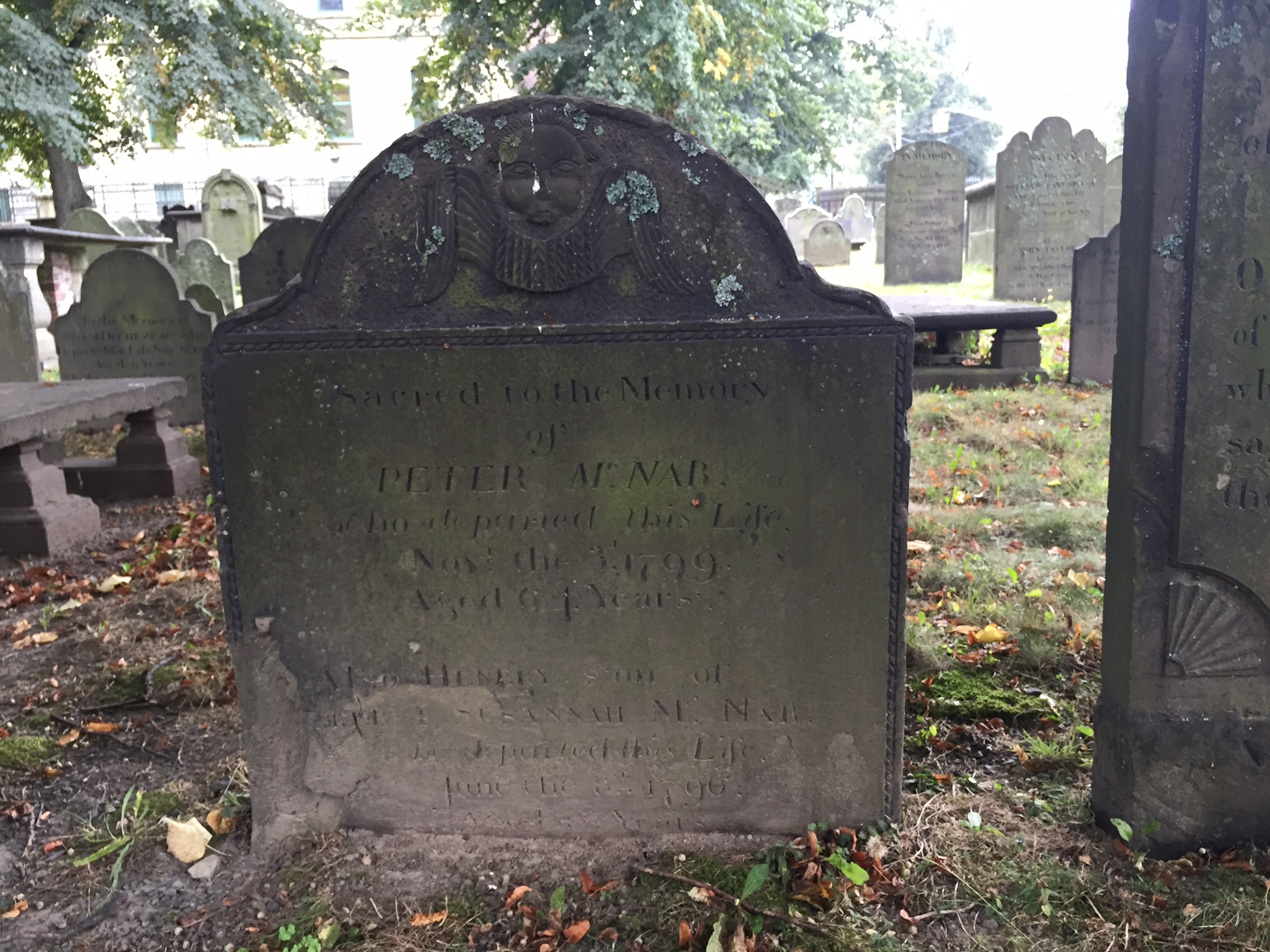
Peter McNab, namesake of McNabs Island

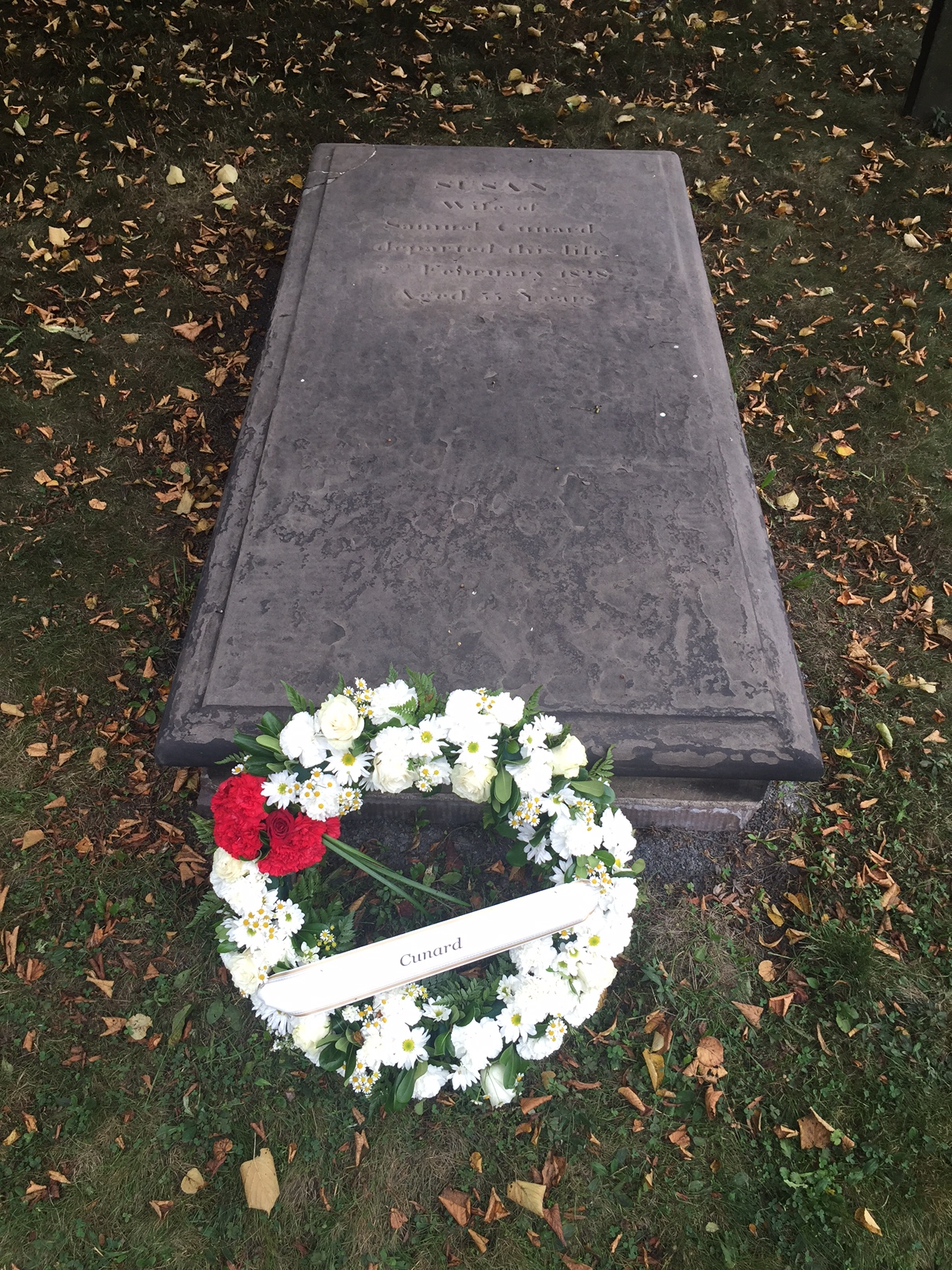
Susan Cunard, wife of Samuel Cunard, died 1828

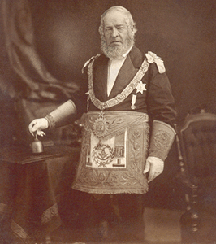
Brewer Alexander Keith's first wife Sarah Ann, died 1832, and the first two children with his second wife

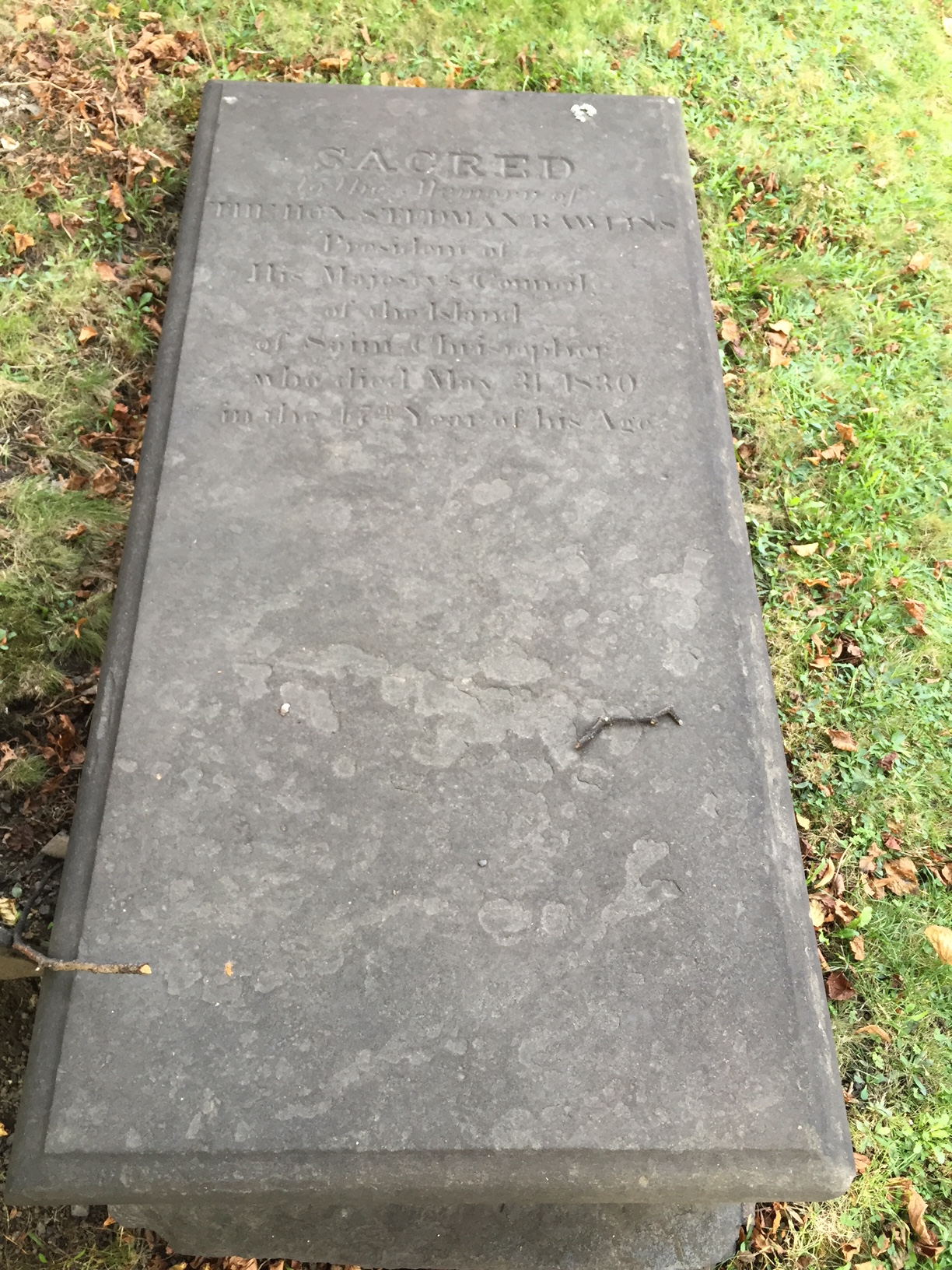
Hon Stedman Rawlins, Slave/ Plantation Owner; died 1830, President of His Majesty's Council of the Island of St. Christopher

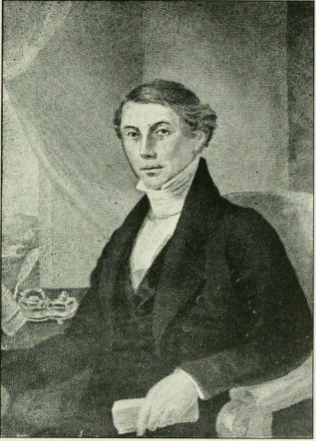
Rev Archibald Gray, died 1831, St. Matthew's United Church (Halifax) for 35 years

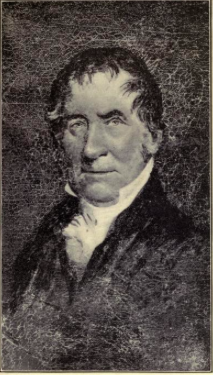
John Albro, died 1839

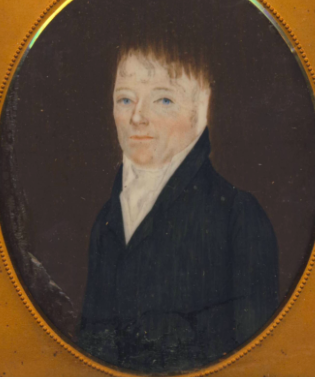
Jonathan Prescott's son Samuel Thomas Prescott, died 1816 (St. Matthew's)
- Mary Welsford, mother of Major Augustus Welsford (Welsford-Parker Monument)
- Charles Morris (1759–1831)
- William Annand, father of William Annand
- Dr. Samuel Head, first doctor born in Nova Scotia
- Robert Collins (died 26 March 1812) and his wife Sarah (Wisdom) Collins (died 31 January 1812), namesake of Collins Grove, Dartmouth
- James Gautier
- Honorable Charles Hill (jurist) died 1825; brother-in-law of Thomas Cochran (Nova Scotia politician); director of the Shubenacadie Canal Company
- John Thomas Twining, died 1832, son of John Thomas Twining
- Phoebe Perkins, died 1820, wife of Rev. Cyrus Perkins, Rector of Annapolis, 1807–1817,

== Sculptor James Hay ==
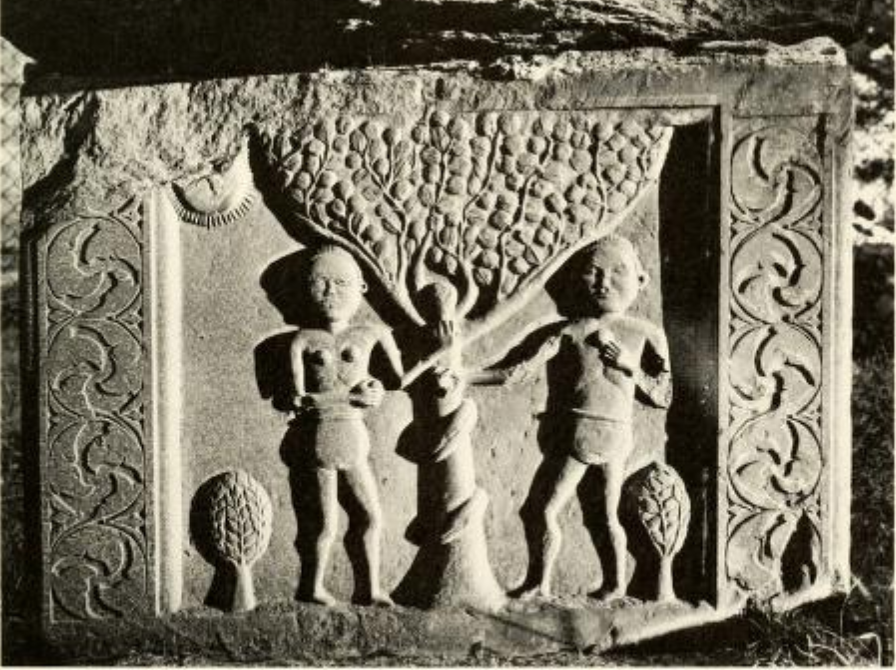
James Hay carving of Mary Bulkeley Grave. Old Burying Ground, Halifax, Nova Scotia

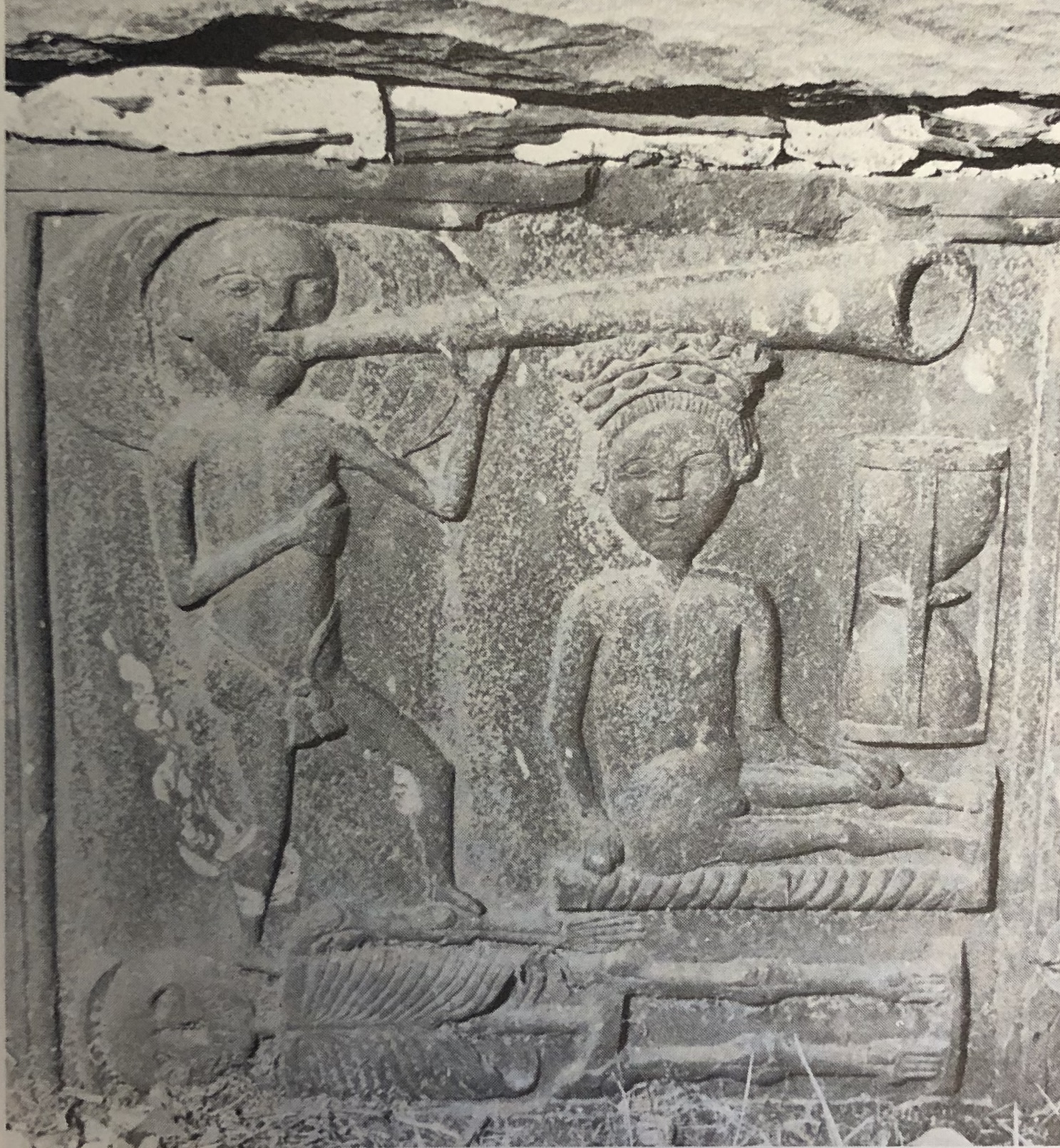
Mary Bulkeley's Grave, Gabriel, Old Burying Ground, Halifax, Nova Scotia

There are various gravestones by stone carvers from London and the local region. Museum curator Deborah Trask asserts that one of the first stone sculptors, James Hay (1750–1842), likely made the gravestone of Richard Bulkeley's wife Mary. On one side Hay carved the angel Gabriel trumpeting, symbolic of the resurrection. The religious text: "In a moment, in a twinkling of an eye at the last trump; for the trumpet shall sound, and the dead shall be raised incorruptible, and we shall be changed" (1 Cor. 15:52). (The trumpeting motive is also on the gravestone of the Lawson children). On the opposite side of the gravestone is an image in the garden of Eden. The religious text: "For as in Adam all die, even so in Christ shall all be made alive." (1 Corinthians 15:22). The image is taken from "The Child's Guide" (London, 1725).

== Depictions in media ==
In Lucy Maud Montgomery's Anne of the Island, Anne moves to Kingsport (Halifax, Nova Scotia) on the mainland and enrols at Redmond (Dalhousie University). She takes lodgings in an apartment that looks out over "Old St. John's Cemetery" – the Old Burying Ground:

They went in by the entrance gates, past the simple, massive, stone arch surmounted by the great lion of England.... They found themselves in a dim, cool, green place where winds were fond of purring. Up and down the long grassy aisles they wandered, reading the quaint, voluminous epitaphs, carved in an age that had more leisure than our own.

The text goes into some depth about the gravestone carvings and styles:

Every citizen of Kingsport feels a thrill of possessive pride in Old St. John's, for, if he be of any pretensions at all, he has an ancestor buried there, with a queer, crooked slab at his head, or else sprawling protectively over the grave, on which all the main facts of his history are recorded. For the most part no great art or skill was lavished on those old tombstones. The larger number are of roughly chiselled brown or gray native stone, and only in a few cases is there any attempt at ornamentation. Some are adorned with skull and cross-bones, and this grizzly decoration is frequently coupled with a cherub's head. Many are prostrate and in ruins. Into almost all Time's tooth has been gnawing, until some inscriptions have been completely effaced, and others can only be deciphered with difficulty. The graveyard is very full and very bowery, for it is surrounded and intersected by rows of elms and willows, beneath whose shade the sleepers must lie very dreamlessly, forever crooned to by the winds and leaves over them, and quite undisturbed by the clamor of traffic just beyond.

== See also ==
- Old Parish Burying Ground (Windsor, Nova Scotia)
- Fort Moncton – oldest British military gravestones in region
- Garrison Cemetery (Annapolis Royal, Nova Scotia)
- Royal Navy Burying Ground (Halifax, Nova Scotia)
- Hillcrest Cemetery (Lunenburg, Nova Scotia)
- St. John's Anglican Church (Lunenburg)
- Little Dutch (Deutsch) Church – St. George's Cemetery
