= Apohaqui, New Brunswick =

Human settlement in New Brunswick, Canada

Coordinates: 45°42′4.11″N 65°35′58.95″W

Location of Apohaqui in New Brunswick

Apohaqui (/ˈæpəhɑːk/ AP-ə-hawk) is an unincorporated community in Kings County, New Brunswick, Canada. It is located on the Kennebecasis River at the confluence of the Millstream River extending approximately from Foxhill to a kilometre east of Riverbank Cemetery on both sides of the Kennebecasis, so that it resides in both Sussex and Studholm parishes on the south and north, respectively.

Apohaqui is home to the Apohaqui Elementary School, Apohaqui Recreation centre and Jones Memorial Park, and Apohaqui Community Church.

== Local Administration ==
Apohaqui north of the river resides in the local government district of Butternut Valley, whereas areas to the south reside in the rural district of Kings.

A special service area on the south side delineates properties taxed to help fund the Apohaqui Millstream Recreation Council which operates community facilities on the north side of the river.

== History ==
Called Studville at first for Major Gilford Studholme, and later when parish lines were laid out became known as Studholm.

Studholm became a station on the European and North American Railway and was renamed Apohaqui by the railway management.

The name Apohaqui may originate from the Wolastoqey word Apologʼaneek. It may also relate to a Wolastokiyik name for junction of two streams.

The Mi’kmaq settled in the Maritime region about 2500 years ago. They shared what is now New Brunswick with the Wolastoqiyik (Maliseet), who settled along the Saint John River. The Wolastokqiyik made extensive use of this river system to travel, hunt and fish. It is said that they would cover amazing distances by portaging in their canoes. Unlike the Mi’kmaq, who often moved their camps, the Wolastoqiyik built permanent villages. Here they grew corn, beans and squash. Their closest encampment was in Apohaqui, a neighbouring village of Sussex. The Maliseet people traveled the Millstream and Kennebecasis Rivers in canoes and lived in the village on the low banks opposite the junction of these rivers. For many years since, others found tools and arrow heads used by the Maliseet people.

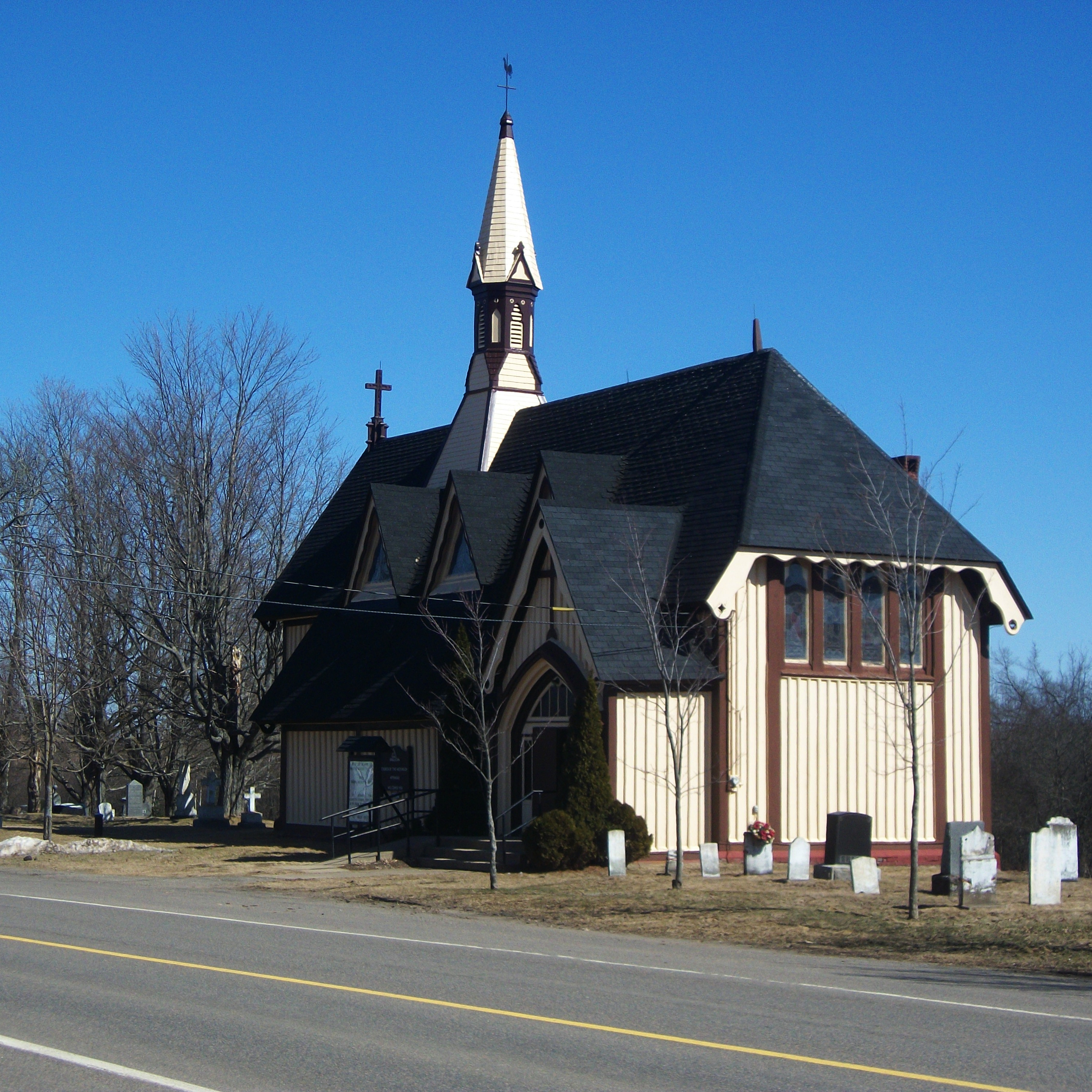
Anglican Church in Apohaqui.

Major Studholm, in command of Fort Howe, welcomed the Loyalists in 1783 and helped them settle in Saint John and surrounding areas including Apohaqui. Major Studholm died in 1792 and was buried in an unmarked grave on a hill in Apohaqui. He had no heirs and it was believed he was quite wealthy. People thought that his money was buried beside his grave and his ghost guards it safely. Treasure-seekers dug in the dead of the night in search of the major's gold but were frightened by the major carrying his treasure on his ghostly horse.

In the early 19th century, Archibald McDonald started the first school in Apohaqui in a room of a house. He opened his school early in the morning and closed at sundown six days a week. In 1868, the first Apohaqui School was built (this building is now a home).

For high school students to go to school, they had to catch the train to Sussex (this train station is now used as an exhibition building at the 8th Hussars Sports Centre in Sussex). In the winter, the students would walk to the school trustee's house to ask for a half-day holiday to go skating. In the summer the children would swim in the river. Many people in Apohaqui worked at Jones mill.

The original Jones Brothers Store was built in the 1870s but burned in 1893. The fire burned many important buildings in Apohaqui. The Jones Store was rebuilt.

== Notable people ==
It is the hometown of former premier of New Brunswick Frank McKenna and former mayor of the city of Saint John Norm McFarlane. Apohaqui is located in southern New Brunswick, about 60 kilometres east of Saint John.

== See also ==
- List of communities in New Brunswick
