= St. John River expedition =

Military action in the American Revolutionary War

- Part of the American Revolutionary War
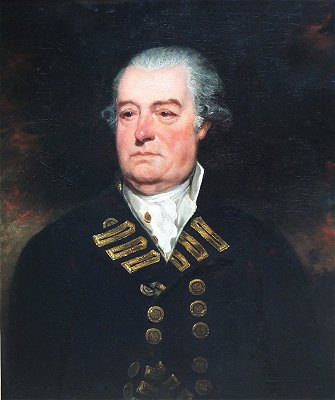
- Admiral Mariot Arbuthnot, Lieutenant Governor of Nova Scotia - sent troops to end John Allan's operations
Date	June 2–30, 1777
Location	Saint John, then Nova Scotia, now New Brunswick 45°16′22″N 66°04′20″W
Result	British victory

Belligerents
United States	Great Britain

Commanders and leaders
John Allan	Gilfred Studholme; Michael Francklin

Strength
about 100 militia	120 troops

Casualties and losses
12 killed	1 killed

The St. John River expedition was an attempt by a small number of militia commanded by John Allan to bring the American Revolutionary War to Nova Scotia in late 1777. With minimal logistical support from Massachusetts and approximately 100 volunteer militia and Natives, Allan's forces occupied the small settlement at the mouth of the Saint John River (present-day Saint John, New Brunswick, then part of Sunbury County, Nova Scotia) in June 1777.

The settlement's defense was weakened by the war effort and that Americans quickly occupied it and took prisoner British sympathizers. Almost a month later, under command of Brigade Major Studholme and Colonel Francklin, British forces successfully drove off the occupying Americans, forcing Allan to make a difficult overland journey back to Machias, Maine. Allan's incursion was the last significant American land-based assault on Nova Scotia during the war, which remained loyal throughout the war.

== Historical context ==
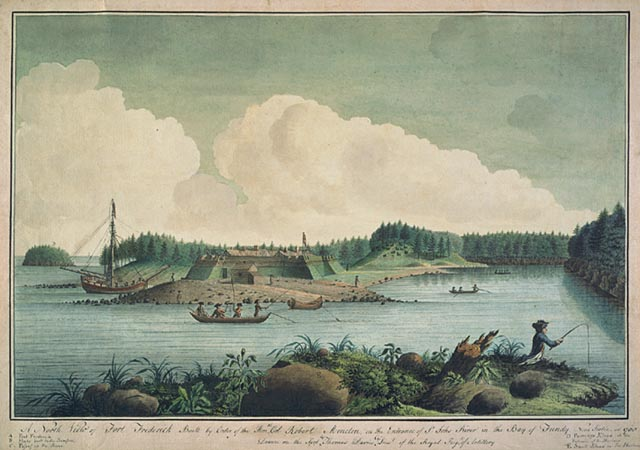
Fort Frederick (1758–1775) was built on the ruins of the French Fort Menagoueche, and destroyed by an American militia in the American Revolutionary War.

In 1776, when the American Revolutionary War began, there was a small British settlement at the mouth of the Saint John River, where the modern city of Saint John, New Brunswick is located. The territory was at the time part of Nova Scotia, and was defended by a small garrison stationed at Fort Frederick. When the war broke out, the garrison was withdrawn to Boston. Under the command of Stephen Smith, an American militia from Machias, Massachusetts (now part of Maine) immediately attacked and burned Fort Frederick. In late 1776, Jonathan Eddy raised a mixed force of Indians, Massachusetts Patriots, and Nova Scotian sympathizers, and unsuccessfully besieged Fort Cumberland, which protected the land approach to Halifax from the west. Privateers also became active in raiding both Nova Scotia shipping and its communities. By the end of 1776, the Americans had taken nearly 350 prizes and raided the Nova Scotian communities of Yarmouth, Digby, and Cornwallis.

In early 1777, John Allan, an expatriate Nova Scotian, was authorized by the Second Continental Congress to organize an expedition to establish a Patriot presence in the western part of Nova Scotia (present-day New Brunswick). Although Congress authorized him to recruit as many as 3,000 men, the Massachusetts government was only prepared to give him a colonel's commission and authority to raise a regiment in eastern Massachusetts to establish a presence in the Saint John River valley. Allan's intention was to establish a permanent post in the area and to recruit the local Maliseet and European settlers to join the American cause. He hoped to recruit a large enough force to launch another assault on Fort Cumberland.

== Expedition ==
Colonel Allan left Machias with a party in four whale boats and four birch canoes, on May 30, 1777. The party, including Indians, numbered 43 men. More than half of Allan's troops had served under Eddy at Fort Cumberland. By the morning of June 2, reinforced by 13 canoes, Allan had proceeded eastward along the coast to Mechogonish (Duck Cove), west of the mouth of the Saint John. Having ascertained that there were no ships or garrison at the mouth of the Saint John, Allan dispatched a party of 16 men under Captain West, who marched 3 miles (4.8 km) through the woods, crossed the river above the Reversing Falls in bark canoes, and made their way to Portland Point, where they surprised and captured James Simonds and William Hazen, two of the Saint John settlement's founders and leading businessmen. Col. Allan and his party remained for about a month on the Saint John recruiting Maliseet Indians. Whilst engaged in his negotiations, which primarily took place at the Maliseet encampment known as Aukpaque (just upriver from present-day Fredericton, New Brunswick), Allan had posted nearly all his men, some 60 in number, at the mouth of the Saint John, under command of Captains Dyer and West.

Allan's intention of establishing a permanent post was cut short when British authorities in Halifax learned of his operation from a Loyalist who escaped Allan's men. The Lieutenant Governor of Nova Scotia, Admiral Marriott Arbuthnot, sent several British war vessels to the mouth of the river. On Monday, June 23, under command of Brigade Major Gilfred Studholme and Colonel Michael Francklin, the British sloop-of-war HMS Vulture arrived, and a few days later she was joined by the frigates Milford and Ambuscade, with a strong detachment of the Royal Fencible Americans and the 84th Regiment of Foot (Royal Highland Emigrants) on board. On the morning of June 30, about 120 men left the ships in barges. They landed at Mahogany Bay (now known as Manawagonish Cove, southwest of Saint John) and then marched 2.5 miles (4.0 km) in the direction of the falls, and had a brief skirmish with Allan's men in the vicinity of the present village of Fairville. In the short firefight, twelve Americans and one member of the 84th regiment were killed. The Americans quickly retreated up the river. Dyer, West, and Allan returned to Machias by way of the Oromocto and Magaguadavic rivers.

== Aftermath ==
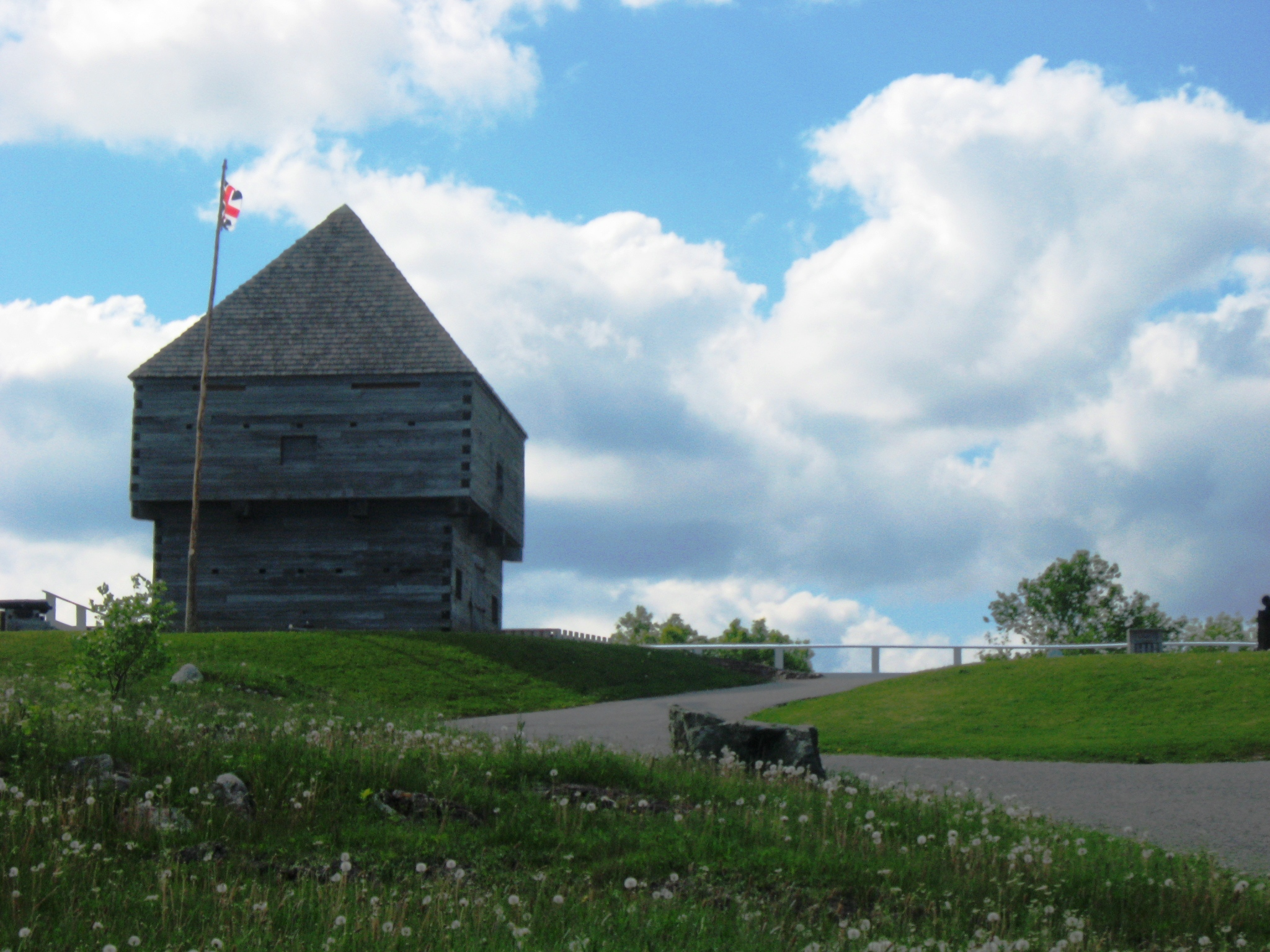
Fort Howe, Saint John, New Brunswick (1777)

Col. Allan's untiring efforts to gain the friendship and support of the Indians, during the four weeks he had been at Aukpaque was somewhat successful. There was a significant exodus of Maliseet from the region to join the American forces at Machias. On Sunday, July 13, 1777, a party of between 400 and 500 men, women, and children, embarked in 128 canoes from the Old Fort Meduetic (8 miles below Woodstock) for Machias. The party arrived at a very opportune moment for the Americans, and afforded material assistance in the defence of that post during the attack made by Sir George Collier on the 13th to 15 August. The British did only minimal damage to the place, and the services of the Indians on the occasion earned for them the thanks of the council of Massachusetts.

After Allan's expedition the British settlers on the Saint John demanded a better defense from Halifax. In response, Major Studholme was sent to provide a permanent military presence (fortuitously frustrating plans by raiders from Machias to further plunder the Saint John settlement), and Fort Howe was built under his auspices in late 1777. The fort protected Saint John for the rest of the war, and the area became a major settlement for expatriate Loyalists after the war. William Hazen and his associates were influential in efforts to retain the loyalty of area Indians to the British cause.

Nova Scotia was not subjected again to land-based invasions, but there continued to be raiding by privateers throughout the war. Later raids on Nova Scotia happened at Liverpool and Lunenburg. Naval battles also took place off the coast of Nova Scotia, including a battle off Halifax and another off present-day Sydney.

== See also ==
- American Revolution - Nova Scotia theatre
- Military history of Nova Scotia
- Military history of the Maliseet people
