= Royal Fencible American Regiment =

Royal Fencible American Regiment of Foot a.k.a. Royal Fencible Americans, RFA
- Active: 1775 - 1783
- Country: Great Britain
- Allegiance: King George III
- Branch: Provincial corps, American command
- Type: Battalion
- Role: Infantry
- Size: 5 companies
- Garrison/HQ: Fort Cumberland, July 1776 - Oct. 1783
- Mottos: PRO REGE ET LEGE (Eng.: For King and Law)
- Engagements: Siege of Fort Cumberland; Saint John River expedition

Commanders
- Notable commanders: Joseph Goreham; Thomas Batt; Gilfred Studholme

The Royal Fencible American Regiment of Foot (or RFA) was a Loyalist battalion of infantry raised in 1775 to defend British interests in the colony of Nova Scotia. The RFA was commanded by Lt. Col. Joseph Goreham throughout its existence. The most notable achievement of the RFA (and its only combat as a regiment) was the successful defense of Fort Cumberland during the Eddy Rebellion in November, 1776, which prevented the revolution in the other American colonies from moving into Nova Scotia.

== Formation ==
Goreham was a prominent landowner in Nova Scotia in 1775, as well as a former officer of Gorham's Rangers during the French and Indian War. Noting the growing tensions in New England and especially Boston between the government and the patriot movement, he wrote the following to Gov. Francis Legge:

Proposed to raise a Battalion of Light infantry or Royal Fensible Americans, To consist of Five Companies.

1 Lieut. Col. Commandant and Captain, 4 Captains, 1 Capt. Lieut., 4 Lieutenants, 5 2d Lieutenants or Ensigns, 15 Serjeants, 15 Corporals, 5 Drummers, 300 Privates, 1 Adjutant, 1 Surgeon, 1 Surgeon's Mate.

That they be clothed and armed as Light Troops and put on the same Establishment of Pay as the late 80th, Gage's Light Infantry and [this] Corps to be employed on the like Services.

"Fencible" troops differed from militia in that they were full-time soldiers and were paid; however they differed from regulars in that they were exempt from overseas service. They were, in effect, a full-time secondary defense force (defensive = fencible). As a former Ranger, Goreham proposed that his regiment serve as light infantry. In the event they served as garrison troops for the regiment's existence.

Goreham's proposal was accepted in April 1775, and recruiting began in Boston, Newfoundland and in and around Halifax; the Boston men were shipped to Halifax in October. At that time the approximately 200 men of the RFA comprised a large portion of the total British forces available in Nova Scotia. This situation changed briefly when Gen. Howe's army arrived in Halifax from Boston in April, 1776, but this army left again for New York in June. Meanwhile, rumours of rebellion stirring in the Cumberland region arrived in Halifax, prompting the authorities to dispatch Goreham's regiment to Fort Cumberland in late May, first overland to Windsor and then by ship via Minas Basin and Chignecto Bay.

Fort Cumberland (originally built by the French as Fort Beauséjour in 1750) was in an advanced state of disrepair by 1776. Goreham set his men to reconstruction, both the buildings and the earthworks, but work went slowly due to the shortage of supplies and equipment, and lack of assistance from the local population, who were mostly pro-patriot. With winter approaching, Goreham had his men put more effort into the accommodations than the fortifications. In spite of this, the fort would be a hard nut to crack by any rebel force without artillery.

=== Battle of Fort Cumberland ===
The fort was strategically important to the British as it guarded the overland route to peninsular Nova Scotia and also the upper reaches of the Bay of Fundy. The rebel forces, led by Colonel Jonathan Eddy, planned to capture the fort, seizing its artillery and stores, as a first step in an overland march via Fort Edward in Windsor to Halifax, raising rebel sympathizers along the way. As there were some sympathizers in the colony, the plan was feasible.

Goreham had deployed an outpost of 14 Fencibles under command of Lt. John Walker, a long time friend of Goreham, to Chipoudy (now Shepody, New Brunswick) in September, about 20 miles (30 km) northwest of the fort, to warn of any approach by rebel forces from New England. On the evening of Oct. 29 Eddy's arriving force of about 150 men overwhelmed the outpost, with one officer of the RFA, 2nd Lt. Solomon King, killed, and the rest taken prisoner. Lt. Walker was wounded. Eddy's men suffered no casualties. Goreham finally became aware of the rebel presence on November 4 when a boat carrying a relief party and supplies for the outpost returned early with the news. By this point Eddy's force had effectively cut all overland communications from the fort, making it impossible to send reports of the invasion to Halifax.

Meanwhile, winter supplies, plus arms and ammunition, for the garrison had arrived on the sloop Polly, escorted by the frigate HMS Juno, on October 31; Juno departed for Halifax on November 3. Polly was brought up a creek near the fort and unloading began with the ship lying in the mud at low tides.

Eddy's army staged its next coup on the night of Nov. 6/7 when a party of 30 men, led by Zebulon Roe, set out to capture the Polly. After a difficult approach march over the tidal flats, with the tide rising, Roe's men took the RFA party aboard by surprise and captured the sloop without firing a shot. Waiting for the rising tide, Roe's men captured a work team and several officers coming to the ship. Finally as the fog lifted around 7am, the rebels were able to sail and tow Polly out of the creek, followed by cannon fire from the fort, which fell short. In all, Goreham lost 49 officers and men captured. Added to the men lost at the outpost, the RFA garrison was down 25% of its strength, plus most of the Polly's provisions.

On Nov. 9 Michael Francklin, the former lieutenant-governor, got word of the invasion from residents around the Minas Basin; he passed these reports to Halifax where planning got underway to relieve the fort. Meanwhile, Eddy presented an ultimatum that Goreham surrender the fort on Nov. 10; Goreham replied with a demand that Eddy surrender instead. His bluff having failed, Eddy began planning for battle.

Although the RFA was down to a strength of 172 all ranks, plus some armed civilians, it's unlikely that Eddy was able to persuade more than about 80 of his men to actually participate in any of the following attacks, so numbers were very much on Goreham's side. The first attack began at 4 AM on November 13. A Maliseet warrior of Eddy's force managed to slip inside the fort, but was wounded by an RFA officer before he could open the main gate, foiling Eddy's plan. After about two hours Eddy disengaged. The warrior, who escaped, was the only casualty on either side. The second attack began in the early morning of November 22. This time the rebels set fire to several buildings to the north of the fort. With a brisk wind blowing from that direction, it was hoped that the fire would spread to the fort, and it very nearly did so. Only desperate but effective fire-fighting by the garrison prevented disaster, and Eddy's men somehow failed to exploit their opportunity. Again there were no fatal casualties on either side. Finally on the morning of Nov. 27 the rebels tried to seize several dozen head of cattle from the marsh below the fort. This attempt was intercepted by two parties of picked men from the Fencibles. In the running fight that followed, several of Eddy's men were killed; the RFA lost one man, Peter Calahan, died of wounds and two others wounded.

Later that morning the entire situation changed with the arrival of the sloop HMS Vulture, including a company of Royal Marines under Cpt. Branson plus Maj. Thomas Batt and Cpt. Gilfred Studholme of the RFA, who had been on duty at Fort Edward. Before dawn on November 29 Maj. Batt led a mixed force of Marines and 74 men of the Fencibles, led by Cpt. Studholme, in a sortie from the fort against the rebel positions on Camp Hill. Somehow Eddy had not noticed the arrival of Vulture and the rebels were taken by surprise. When the alarm was finally sounded, the Fencibles "gave a loud Huzzah and ran like lions" towards Eddy's headquarters, according to Batt's report to Goreham. Eddy was nearly captured and rebel resistance was broken. The homes of many rebels and sympathizers were burned. The RFA lost one man, Michael Dickie, killed, one died of wounds, and three wounded; one Marine was wounded, and at least three of Eddy's men were killed, with several others taken prisoner. Batt was later commended by King George for his conduct.

== Later service ==
Most of the RFA remained at Fort Cumberland for the duration of the war. In September 1777 a company under command of Studholme was part of an expeditionary force to the Saint John River. Sent in response to a rebel expedition to the area, they captured some New England rebels and drove others up the river to secure that part of Nova Scotia (now New Brunswick). Men of the RFA, under Studholme's direction, constructed Fort Howe near the river mouth, and garrisoned it until the end of the war.

In 1777 Goreham had a major dispute with Batt, probably due to Goreham's terms of amnesty granted to the rebels on December 1, 1776, which were also disapproved of by some parties in Halifax.

The regiment was disbanded on October 10, 1783, at Halifax and Fort Howe. Officers and men received land grants, plus tools and provisions, if they chose. Studholme was appointed agent for these arrangements. Fourteen other ranks took up grants in Remsheg (today Wallace, NS) while 57 officers and other ranks are listed as having settled in New Brunswick.

== Uniforms ==
For nearly two years after its formation, the men of the RFA mostly wore civilian clothing, essentially, whatever they were wearing when enlisted. This caused them great hardship in winter, and Goreham permitted them to wear blankets or rugs in lieu of greatcoats when on sentry at Fort Cumberland. They would have looked very much like their rebel opponents during the siege. Their first uniforms arrived in early 1777, green coats faced white, with white smallclothes, in common with most other Loyalist corps of the American command at that time. Officers wore silver lace. By 1780 the regiment was wearing red coats faced black, probably with white lace for other ranks.

== In popular culture ==
- Thomas H. Raddall's novel His Majesty's Yankees (Doubleday, New York, 1942) is centered around the Siege of Fort Cumberland.

== See also ==
- List of British fencible regiments
- Nova Scotia Fencibles

== Bibliography ==
- Piers, Harry; "The Fortieth Regiment, Raised at Annapolis Royal in 1717; and Five Regiments Subsequently Raised in Nova Scotia"; Collections of the Nova Scotia Historical Society, vol. XXI, Halifax, NS, 1927, pp 152–58.
- Clarke, Ernest; The Siege of Fort Cumberland, 1776; McGill-Queen's University Press, Montreal & Kingston, 1995. ISBN 0-7735-1867-3
- Chartrand, René; American Loyalist Troops 1775-84; illust. by Gerry & Samuel Embleton; Osprey Publishing Ltd., Oxford, UK, 2008. ISBN 978-1-84603-314-8
