= Eddington, Maine =

Town in Maine, United States

- Town
- Location within Maine Location within the United States
- Coordinates: 44°48′24″N 68°37′21″W
- Country: United States
- State: Maine
- County: Penobscot
- Founder: Jonathan Eddy
- Named for: Jonathan Eddy

Area
  - Total: 26.54 sq mi (68.74 km^{2})
  - Land: 24.99 sq mi (64.72 km^{2})
  - Water: 1.55 sq mi (4.01 km^{2})
- Elevation: 240 ft (73 m)

Population (2020)
  - Total: 2,194
  - Density: 88/sq mi (33.9/km^{2})
- Time zone: UTC-5 (Eastern (EST))
  - Summer (DST): UTC-4 (EDT)
- ZIP code: 04428
- Area code: 207
- FIPS code: 23-22535
- GNIS feature ID: 582461
- Website: www.eddingtonmaine.gov

Eddington is a town located on the eastern side of the Penobscot River in Penobscot County, Maine, United States. As of the 2020 census, the town had a population of 2,194.

== History ==
The town was founded by and named after Jonathan Eddy, a militia captain in the French and Indian War, a colonel in the American Revolutionary War, and the first magistrate in the area. Eddy and most of the town's other original settlers migrated to the town from Nova Scotia, where they had supported the rebel cause against the majority British Loyalist population. Eddy tried to make Nova Scotia—the 14th American colony—join the revolution by leading the Siege of Fort Cumberland. After the siege failed, Eddy and others emigrated to the District of Maine and were given land grants in present-day Eddington. Later in the war, Eddy successfully defended Maine from a British attack in the Battle of Machias (1777).

== Geography ==
According to the United States Census Bureau, the town has a total area of 26.54 square miles (68.74 km^{2}), of which 24.99 square miles (64.72 km^{2}) is land and 1.55 square miles (4.01 km^{2}) is water.

== Demographics ==
Historical population
Census	Pop.	Note	%±
1800	167		—
1810	205		22.8%
1820	271		32.2%
1830	405		49.4%
1840	595		46.9%
1850	696		17.0%
1860	856		23.0%
1870	776		−9.3%
1880	746		−3.9%
1890	729		−2.3%
1900	663		−9.1%
1910	611		−7.8%
1920	527		−13.7%
1930	487		−7.6%
1940	571		17.2%
1950	664		16.3%
1960	958		44.3%
1970	1,358		41.8%
1980	1,769		30.3%
1990	1,947		10.1%
2000	2,052		5.4%
2010	2,225		8.4%
2020	2,194		−1.4%
U.S. Decennial Census

=== 2010 census ===
As of the census of 2010, there were 2,225 people, 930 households, and 643 families living in the town. The population density was 89.0 inhabitants per square mile (34.4/km^{2}). There were 1,037 housing units at an average density of 41.5 per square mile (16.0/km^{2}). The racial makeup of the town was 97.8% White, 0.6% African American, 0.5% Native American, 0.5% Asian, and 0.7% from two or more races. Hispanic or Latino of any race were 0.3% of the population.

There were 930 households, of which 28.2% had children under the age of 18 living with them, 54.2% were married couples living together, 10.4% had a female householder with no husband present, 4.5% had a male householder with no wife present, and 30.9% were non-families. 23.5% of all households were made up of individuals, and 8% had someone living alone who was 65 years of age or older. The average household size was 2.37 and the average family size was 2.76.

The median age in the town was 44.1 years. 20% of residents were under the age of 18; 6.1% were between the ages of 18 and 24; 25.7% were from 25 to 44; 33.2% were from 45 to 64; and 15.1% were 65 years of age or older. The gender makeup of the town was 49.7% male and 50.3% female.

=== 2000 census ===
As of the census of 2000, there were 2,052 people, 825 households, and 595 families living in the town. The population density was 81.7 inhabitants per square mile (31.5/km^{2}). There were 920 housing units at an average density of 36.6 per square mile (14.1/km^{2}). The racial makeup of the town was 97.95% White, 0.15% African American, 0.49% Native American, 0.29% Asian, 0.00% Pacific Islander, 0.29% from other races, and 0.83% from two or more races. 0.39% of the population were Hispanic or Latino of any race.

There were 825 households, out of which 30.2% had children under the age of 18 living with them, 58.5% were married couples living together, 8.7% had a female householder with no husband present, and 27.8% were non-families. 21.1% of all households were made up of individuals, and 6.7% had someone living alone who was 65 years of age or older. The average household size was 2.46 and the average family size was 2.84.

In the town, the population was spread out, with 22.1% under the age of 18, 6.4% from 18 to 24, 30.9% from 25 to 44, 27.5% from 45 to 64, and 13.0% who were 65 years of age or older. The median age was 40 years. For every 100 females, there were 98.6 males. For every 100 females age 18 and over, there were 96.3 males.

The median income for a household in the town was $40,250, and the median income for a family was $45,966. Males had a median income of $31,105 versus $22,445 for females. The per capita income for the town was $19,113. 6.7% of the population and 3.2% of families were below the poverty line. Out of the total population, 5.5% of those under the age of 18 and 4.6% of those 65 and older were living below the poverty line.

== Notable people ==
- Jonathan Eddy, American Revolutionary War colonel; town namesake; buried in Eddington
- Norman Kelley, operatic tenor; born and raised in Eddington
- Peter Lyford, state legislator
