= Carleton Martello Tower =

Martello Tower in Saint John, New Brunswick

- Saint John, New Brunswick, Canada
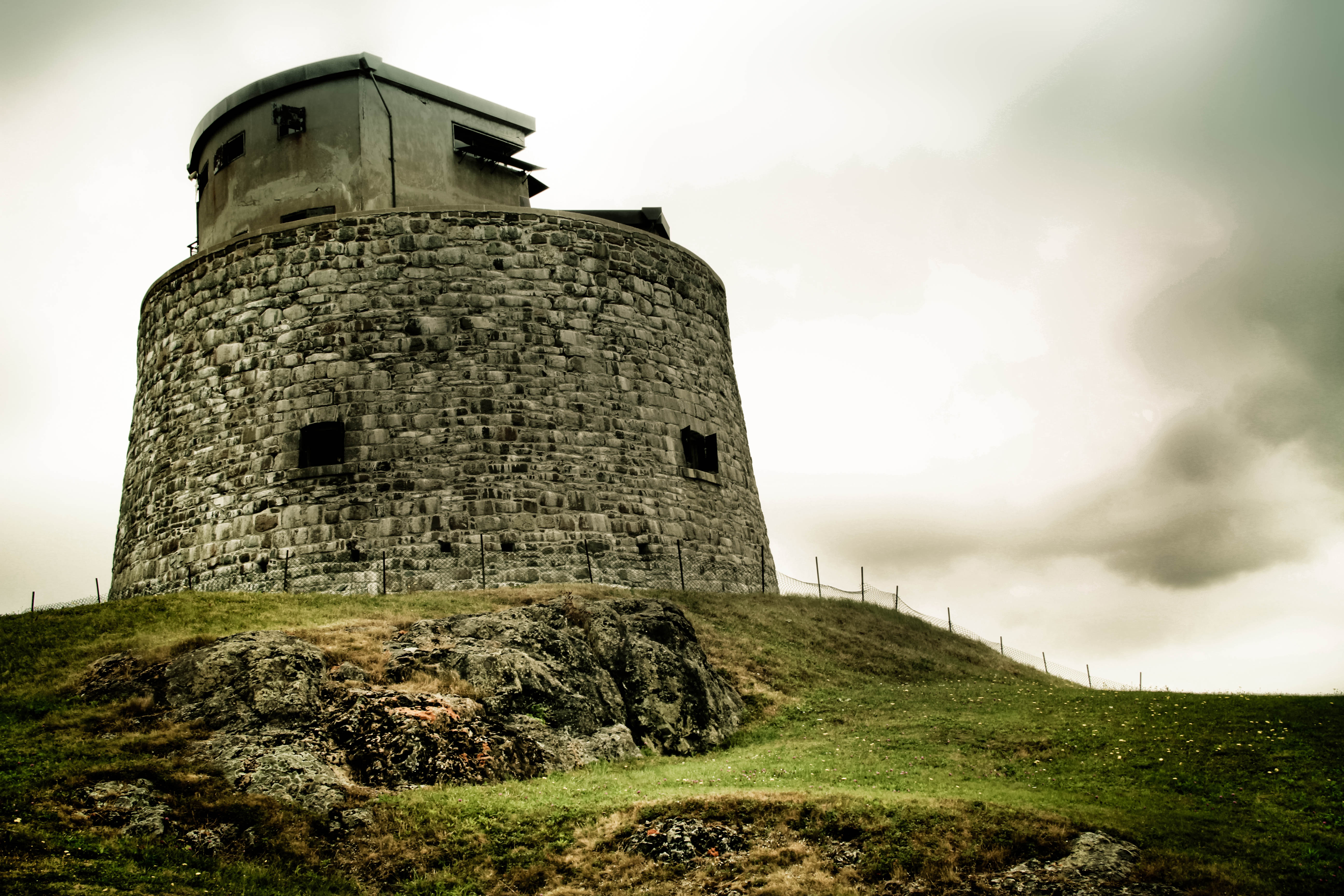
- Carleton Martello Tower

Site information
- Type: Martello Tower

Location
- Coordinates: 45.2521°N 66.0760°W

Site history
- Built: 1813
- In use: 1813-1944
- Materials: masonry
- Battles/wars

National Historic Site of Canada
- Official name: Carleton Martello Tower National Historic Site of Canada
- Designated: 1930

Carleton Martello Tower in Saint John, New Brunswick, is one of the nine surviving Martello Towers in Canada. The tower dates from the War of 1812 and played a significant role in conflicts until the Second World War. The site now features a restored powder magazine, a restored barracks room, and exhibits in the tower and in the visitor centre. The tower's roof offers a view of the city of Saint John and its harbour. Carleton Martello Tower is one of the oldest buildings in the city and has been designated as a National Historic Site of Canada since 1930. It has been open to the public since 1963.

== History ==
Construction of the tower began in 1813, during the War of 1812, on a rocky cliff to guard the land approaches to the city. It was intended to defend against an overland invasion from the United States, but the tower was not completed until 1815, after the war had ended. The tower was a circular masonry structure, 30 ft. high and 50 ft. in diameter. The plans called for it to receive three 4-pounder and two 24-pounder guns but these were never installed.

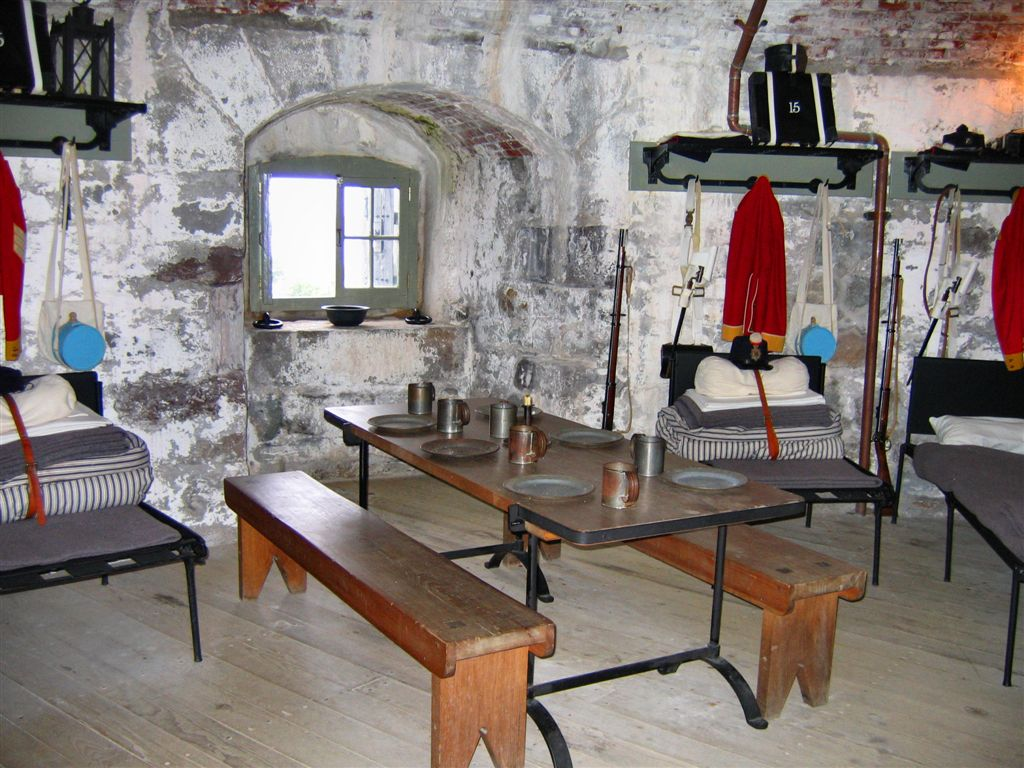
Interior of Carleton Martello Tower

Carleton Martello Tower was the third link to the defences of the city of Saint John, together with Fort Howe, protecting the river narrows, and Fort Dufferin, guarding the harbour entrance near Partridge Island.

In 1846, a bombproof magazine was built inside the tower, enabling it to serve as a powder magazine from 1859 to 1866. In 1866 it received two 32-pounder guns that the New Brunswick Regiment of Garrison Artillery manned to defend the city in the event of Fenian raids. The guns were removed in 1877.

From 1866 to 1869, the tower served as a barracks. During World War I it served as a detention centre for deserters of the 69th Battalion from November 1915 until April 1916.

In late 1939, at the beginning of World War II, the 8th Anti-Aircraft Battery placed some machine guns on the upper level of the tower. In August 1941 a two-storey concrete structure was placed on top of the tower to enable the tower to function as a Fire Command Post, in which role it remained until August 1944. On 20 April 1942 the tower received a No. 3 Mark 4 telescope and a No. 10 Director. On 1 May 1943 a Mark II Position Finder was added to the fire control equipment on the tower. Soldiers of the 3rd New Brunswick Coast Brigade manned the tower from 1941 until it ceased operations in 1944.
