= Battle of Machias (1777) =

1777 American Revolutionary War battle

- Part of the American Revolutionary War
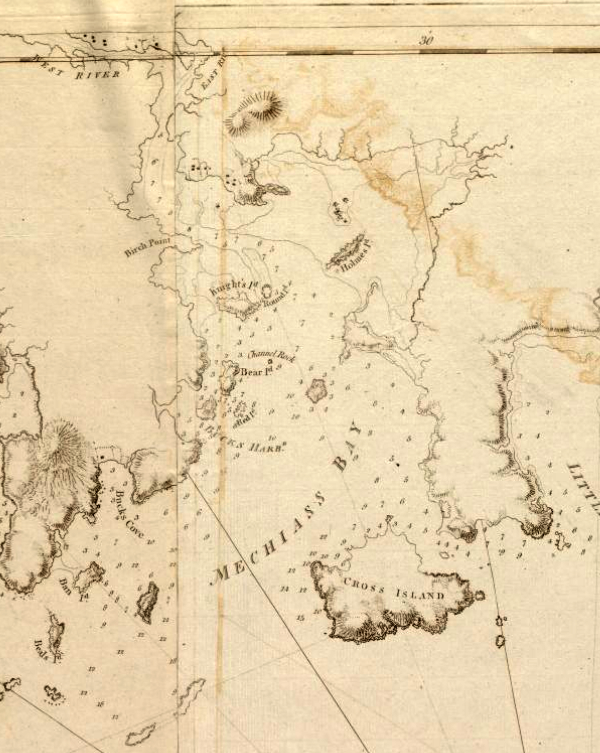
- A 1776 nautical chart of Machias Bay; Machias is at the very top. Machias Bay is on the coast of eastern Maine. Machiasport is located near the outlet of the Machias River into the bay. Upriver and north from Machiasport, the river branches, leading left (west) to Machias, and east to East Machias.
Date	August 13–14, 1777
Location	Machias, Maine 44°42′50.58″N 67°27′39.1″W
Result	See Aftermath

Belligerents
Great Britain	United States; Penobscot; Passamaquoddy; Maliseet

Commanders and leaders
Sir George Collier	Jonathan Eddy; Stephen Smith; John Allan

Strength
3 frigates 1 brig 1 sloop-of-war 123 marines	Local militia; allied Native Americans

Casualties and losses
3 killed 18 wounded	1 killed 1 wounded

The Battle of Machias (August 13–14, 1777) was an amphibious assault on the town of Machias in the Massachusetts District of Maine by British forces during the American Revolutionary War. Local militia aided by Indian allies successfully prevented British troops from landing. The raid, led by Commodore Sir George Collier, was executed in an attempt to head off a planned second assault on Fort Cumberland, which had been besieged in November 1776. The British forces landed below Machias, seized a ship, and raided a storehouse.

The result of the raid was disputed. Collier claimed the action was successful in destroying military stores for an attack on Fort Cumberland (although such stores had not been delivered to Machias), while the defenders claimed that they had successfully prevented the capture of Machias and driven off the British.

== Background ==
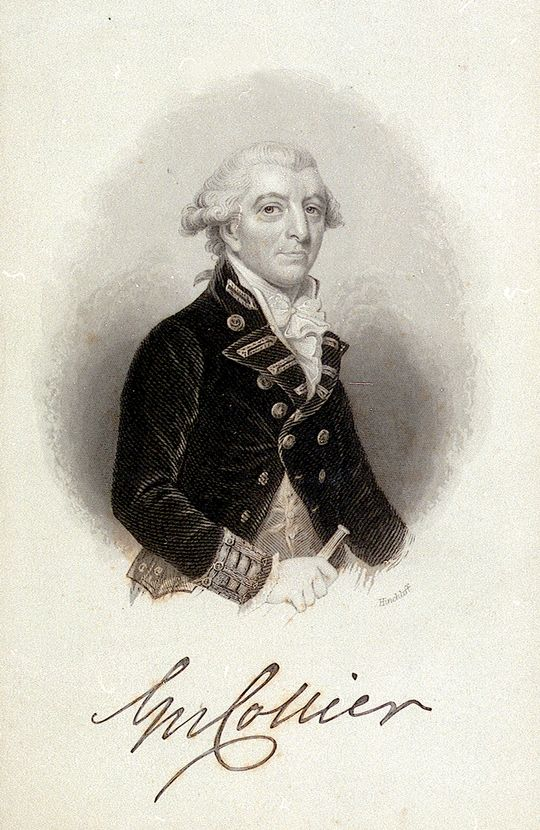
Sir George Collier

The community of Machias, located in the Massachusetts District of Maine, was a persistent thorn in the side of British naval authorities since the start of the American Revolutionary War. In June 1775, its citizens rose up and seized a small naval vessel, and the community had ever since been a base for privateering.

In 1777, John Allan, an expatriate Nova Scotian, was authorized by the Second Continental Congress to organize an expedition to establish a Patriot presence in the western part of Nova Scotia (present-day New Brunswick), on the opposite shore. Although Congress authorized him to recruit as many as three thousand men, the Massachusetts government was only prepared to give him a colonel's commission and authority to raise a regiment in eastern Massachusetts to establish a presence in the St. John River valley. Allan based his effort in Machias, and had by June landed some forty men in the area. However, British authorities in Halifax had received some intelligence of Allan's intended mission, and a larger British force arrived at the St. John River on June 23. Men that Allan had left at the settlements near the mouth of the river skirmished with the British but then withdrew upriver. Allan was forced to make a difficult overland journey back to Machias after his small force retreated up the river. He was joined on this journey by a number of sympathetic Maliseet Indians that he had persuaded to join the American cause. In early August the Massachusetts Provisional Congress voted to disband forces recruited for Allan's expedition because of the imminent threat posed by the army of General John Burgoyne in upstate New York.

Papers documenting Allan's fairly elaborate plans, including a projected attack on Fort Cumberland, were taken during the conflict on the St. John River and fell into the hands of Captain Sir George Collier, second-in-command to Admiral Mariot Arbuthnot in the naval station at Halifax. This spurred Collier to act, since there had already been one attempt on Fort Cumberland the previous year. He therefore organized an assault on Machias, Allan's base of operations and the source of many of his recruits. Because Collier and the commander of land forces at Halifax, General Eyre Massey, did not get along, Collier decided to launch the expedition without taking on any British Army troops. He sailed from Halifax in late July in the frigate HMS Rainbow, accompanied by the brig HMS Blonde, planning to use the marines aboard those ships in ground operations. He was joined by the frigate HMS Mermaid and the sloop HMS Hope while making the passage to Machias.

The defense of Machias consisted of local militia under the command of Colonel Jonathan Eddy, the leader of the 1776 attack on Fort Cumberland. He had been warned that the British were organizing an attack. The militia laid a log boom across the Machias River, and constructed several earthen redoubts further upriver, armed with cannons taken from local privateers. The defense was coincidentally reinforced by forty to fifty Maliseet, Passamaquoddy, and Penobscots that Colonel Allan had called to Machias to explain what had gone wrong with his expedition.

== Battle ==
Collier's fleet arrived at the mouth of the river early on August 13. He boarded 123 marines onto the Hope, and ordered her and the Blonde up the river. Word of this reached the militia, and thirty-five men mustered to oppose them. The ships reached the log boom, and a firefight began between the two forces. The militia resistance was sufficient to keep the British from attempting a landing that day. Early the next morning, under the cover of fog, the marines were landed. They cut the log boom, seized a sloop carrying lumber, and set fire to a storehouse, seizing stores of flour, rice, corn, shoes, and ammunition before returning to the ships.

The two ships then moved further up the river until they reached the town itself. All along the way they were harassed by musket and cannon fire from the shore, as the militia and their Indian allies positioned themselves to dispute possible landing sites. When darkness set in, the Indians reportedly began chanting and shouting in an attempt to magnify their numbers. At this point, "To the great Surprise and Astonishment of every one[,] in Less than half an Hour after Coming to an Anchor, the Brig & Sloop Both Gote under way without firing a Gun" and "made down the River against the Tide of flood." The Hope, however, ran aground while making its way downstream in the twilight. The militia hauled a swivel gun to a nearby shore, and peppered her with shot the next morning before she was refloated by the tide and made her way into Machias Bay.

== Aftermath ==
Colonel Allan ascribed the militia's success to British concerns that they might be entering a trap. He also grandiosely likened the encounter to another battle, writing "not an Action during the War Except Bunker Hill there was such a slaughter". American estimates of British casualties ran from forty to one hundred, while claiming their own casualties at one killed and one wounded. The British reported their losses as three killed and eighteen wounded, which were mainly incurred when the Hope grounded.

After departing from Machias, Collier cruised the Maine coast, capturing smaller American ships, and raided communities on the Sheepscot River. There he captured a frigate laden with mast timbers destined for France. In his report Collier declared the mission a success and claimed to have successfully forestalled another invasion of Nova Scotia. He also believed that with another one hundred men "the destruction [of Machias] would have been compleat." General Massey, whose troops had been preparing to participate in the expedition but were excluded by Collier's abrupt departure from Halifax, wrote that Collier "wanted the whole honour of destroying Machias," and that he "stole out of Halifax, made a futile attack on Machias, was most shamefully drove from thence".

Machias was not attacked again during the war, although it became somewhat isolated when the British occupied Castine in 1779, establishing the colony of New Ireland. Collier returned to successfully defend New Ireland from the American patriot Penobscot Expedition. (Machias and other parts of eastern Maine were successfully occupied by British forces during the War of 1812, where again the British created the colony of New Ireland, but were returned to United States control after the war.)

== See also ==
- Military history of Nova Scotia
