= Fort Frederick (Saint John, New Brunswick) =

Coordinates: 45.262°N 66.073°W

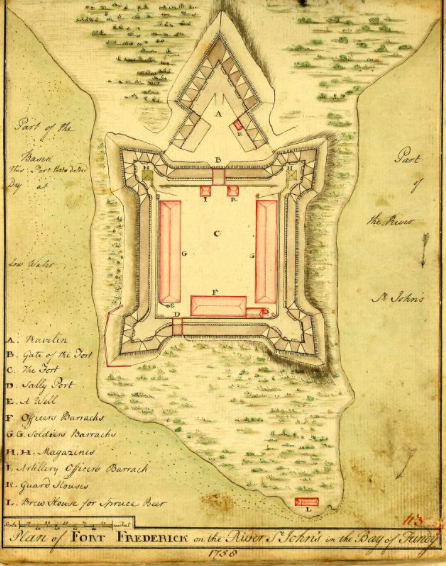
Fort Frederick St John River, New Brunswick

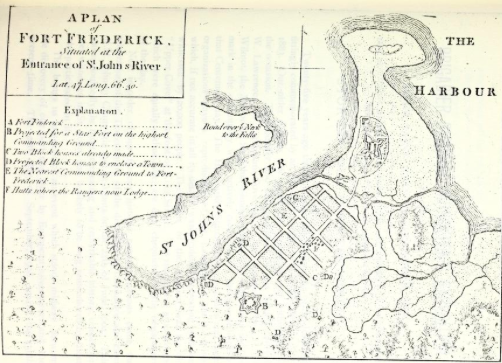
Fort Frederick, Saint John, New Brunswick

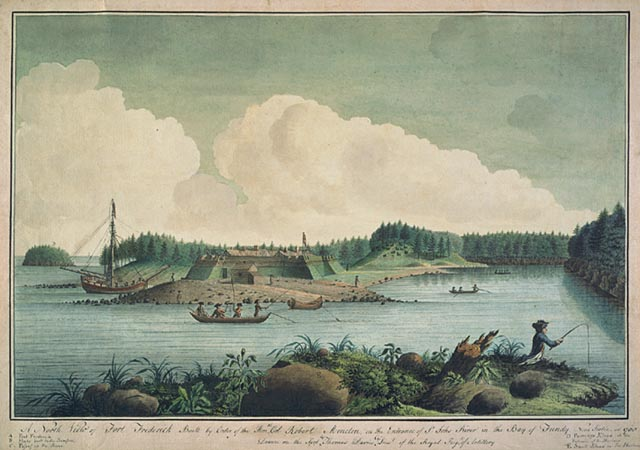
St. John River Campaign: The Construction of Fort Frederick (1758) by Thomas Davies

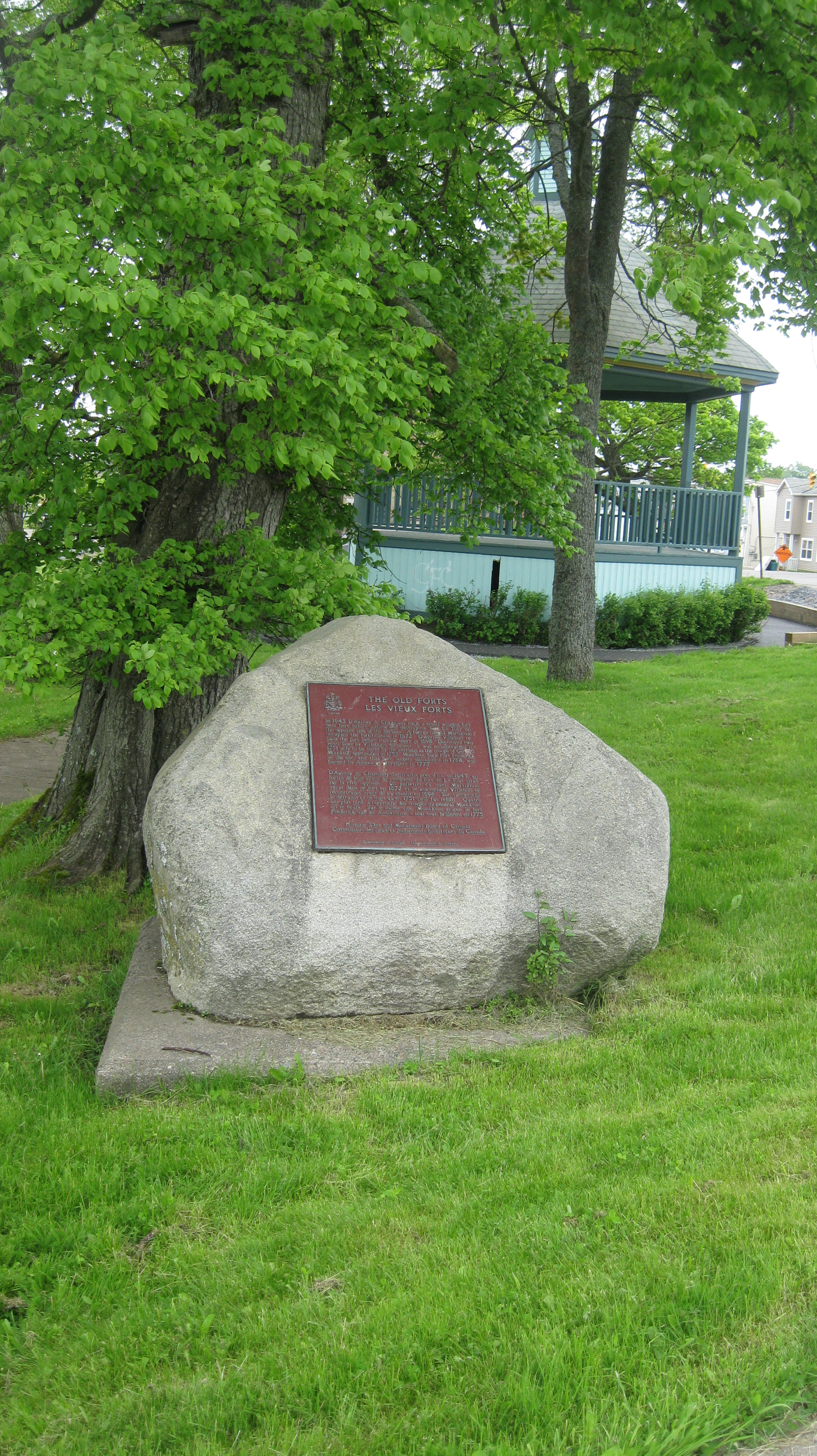
Monument to Fort Frederick and other forts on the same site, Saint John, New Brunswick

Fort Frederick (1758—1777, earlier Fort Menagoueche, superseded by Fort Howe in 1777) was a British fort at what is now Saint John, New Brunswick, Canada. It was built during the St. John River Campaign of the French and Indian War. It was one of three significant forts which the British built on the major rivers in the Northeast to cut off the natives' water way to the ocean to prevent attacks on the British settlers (see also Fort Halifax and Fort Pownall).

On September 13, 1758, Robert Monckton and a strong force of regulars and rangers (Gorham's Rangers, Danks' Rangers and Rogers' Rangers) left Halifax, and arrived at the mouth of the St. John River a week later. He established a new base of operations by reconstructing Fort Menagoueche, which had been destroyed in 1755, and which he renamed Fort Frederick. Establishing Fort Frederick allowed the British to virtually cut off the communications and supplies to the villages on the St. John River. (Fort Frederick (Maine) was decommissioned the following year.)

During the American Revolution, American Privateers pillaged and burned Fort Frederick in the Raid on St. John (1775). After the St. John River expedition, under the command of Gilfred Studholme, the fort was replaced with Fort Howe to the north across the St. John River in 1777.

== Commanders ==
- Major Roger Morris
- Lt Col Arbuthnot
- Lt Tong
- Ensign Jeremiah Mears

== See also ==
- Military history of Nova Scotia
