= Gilfred Studholme =

British military officer (1740–1792)

Gilfred Studholme (1740–1792) was a British military officer who commanded forces on the Saint John River, Nova Scotia during the American Revolution. He was commissioned in the Loyal Nova Scotia Volunteers at the outbreak of the war and later served as a captain in the Royal Fencible Americans and promoted to Brigade-Major. Studholme rescued Joseph Gorham in pushing back the American attack in the Battle of Fort Cumberland. After the St. John River expedition, Studholme replaced Fort Frederick with a fort he built on higher ground, which was named Fort Howe. At this fort, Studholme was helpful to Michael Francklin in ensuring peace with the Mi'kmaq and Malecites (1780). After the war, he was appointed by Governor John Parr to "the care and superintending" of the loyalist settlers on the Saint John. He was eventually named to the first Executive Council of the new province of New Brunswick (1784).

== Legacy ==
- namesake of Studholm Parish, New Brunswick

== See also ==
- Military history of Nova Scotia
- Nova Scotia in the American Revolution
