= Jonathan Eddy =

American military officer and politician

- Born: 1726; Norton, Massachusetts
- Died: 1804 (aged 77–78); Eddington, Maine
- Burial place: Eddington, Maine
- Military career
- Allegiance: Kingdom of Great Britain; United States of America
- Service years: 1755–1783
- Rank: Colonel 1775–1777
- Conflicts: French and Indian War; Battle of Beausejour; American Revolutionary War; Battle of Fort Cumberland; Battle of Machias

Jonathan Eddy (c. 1726–1804) was an American military officer and politician who served in the French and Indian War and the American Revolutionary War. After the French and Indian War, he settled in Nova Scotia as a New England Planter, becoming a member of the General Assembly of Nova Scotia. During the American Revolutionary War, he was strongly supportive of the rebellion against the Crown. He encouraged the residents of Nova Scotia to join in open revolt against King George III and England. He led a failed attempt to capture Fort Cumberland in 1776 and was forced to retreat to Massachusetts, the place of his birth. The following year, he led the defense of Machias, Maine during the Battle of Machias (1777). After the war, he established the community now known as Eddington, Maine in 1784, where he died.

== French and Indian War ==
Jonathan Eddy was born in Norton, Massachusetts in 1726 or 1727. In 1755, he enlisted in the Massachusetts militia and participated in Robert Monckton's successful capture of Fort Beauséjour on the Isthmus of Chignecto in the French and Indian War. He received a militia captain's commission in 1758, when he apparently saw no action, and again in 1759, when his company was garrisoned at Fort Cumberland (the name Fort Beauséjour was switched after its capture). After the war, Eddy returned home to Norton, only to return to Cumberland as a New England Planter in 1763. From 1770 to 1775 he served in the Nova Scotia House of Assembly, representing Cumberland Township.

== American Revolution ==
When the American Revolutionary War began in Massachusetts in 1775, Eddy openly supported the rebellion. Following Governor Francis Legge's crackdown on seditious persons, and seeing an opportunity, Eddy fled to his riding in Cumberland. He made frequent excursions to see Samuel Adams and the General Court of Massachusetts, as well as to General George Washington. There, he was met with varying degrees of support for his proposed rebellion. Adams pledged full support, troops, weapons, ammunition and more, while Washington was less enthusiastic, failing to promise direct support for the venture. He was eventually able to convince the Massachusetts legislature to provide logistical support in the form of small arms (muskets) and other military supplies.

In the summer of 1776, Mariot Arbuthnot, the new governor of Nova Scotia, ordered Colonel Joseph Goreham's Royal Fencible American Regiment to secure Fort Cumberland and keep watch for any signs of an American invasion of the province. Eddy, knowing he was being monitored by authorities loyal to the Crown, fled to Massachusetts where he was made a full colonel in the Continental Army and was given authority to raise a regiment of his own with the sole purpose of the invasion of Nova Scotia through Cumberland and Truro and then east into Halifax.

=== Siege of Fort Cumberland ===
Shortly after General William Howe's army departed Nova Scotia to attack New York in 1776, Eddy made his move. His force of 180 American militiamen, Natives, and Nova Scotians marched on Fort Cumberland. They attempted to storm the fort on November 13, 1776, but were repulsed. Two more attempts were made on November 22 and 23, but on November 28 HMS Vulture arrived at the head of the Bay of Fundy with British marines aboard and relieved the fort in a joint operation with the RFA garrison. Eddy and his militia force were scattered, eventually regrouping near the Saint John River. Eddy and many of his supporters who had lived near the fort had their properties destroyed in retaliation.

Eddy spent the remainder of the war managing the defense of Machias in the District of Maine (then a part of Massachusetts), and was awarded a tract of land in the Ohio Country in 1801 for his role in the war. He moved to Stoughtonham after the war, where he served in the Massachusetts legislature. In 1784 he established a settlement on the eastern bank of the Penobscot River that grew to become Eddington, Maine, where he died in 1804.

== See also ==
- Military history of Nova Scotia
