= Fort Howe =

Coordinates: 45°16′36″N 66°04′23″W

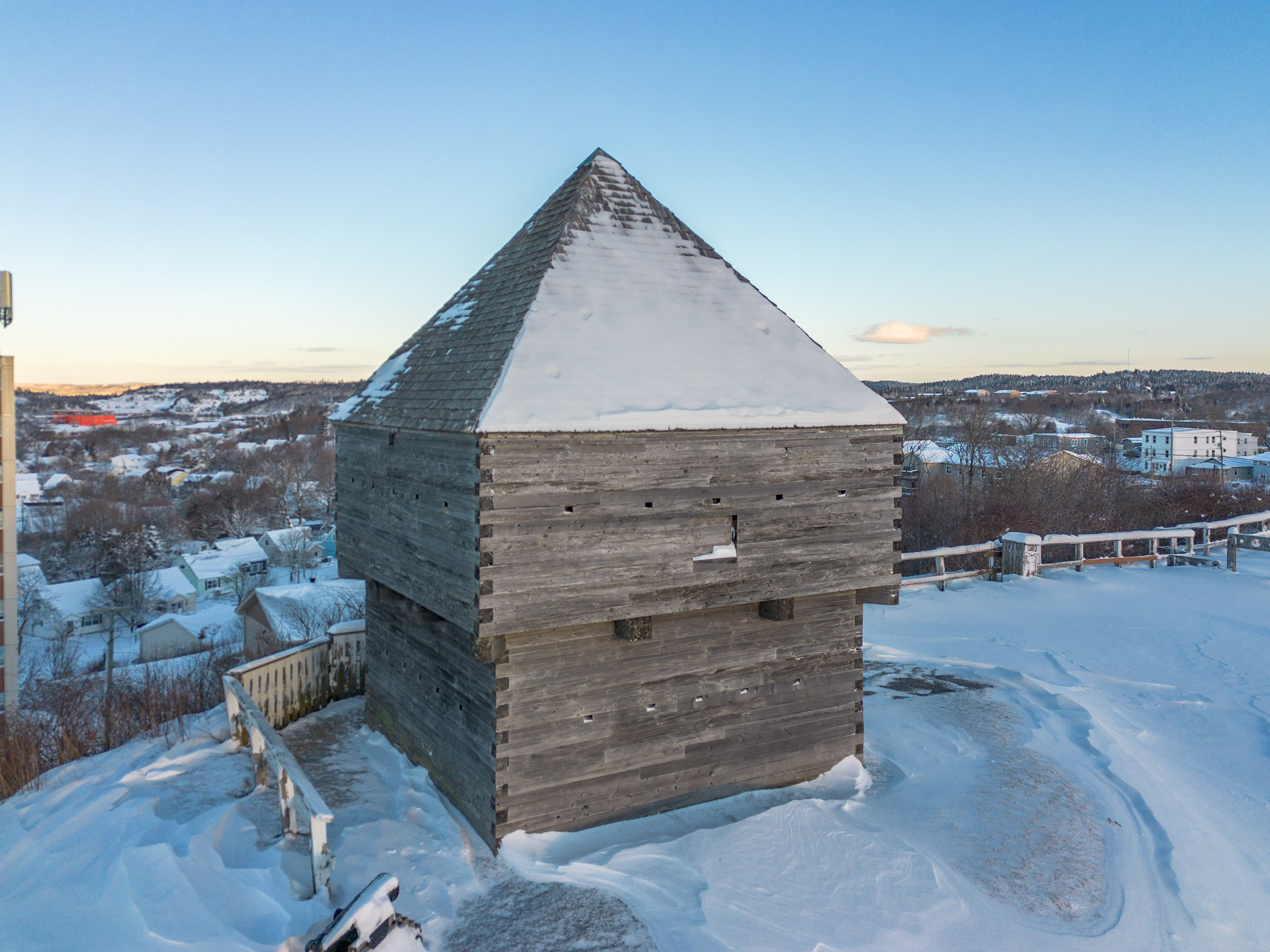
- Fort Howe in 2026
- Interactive map of Fort Howe
- Location: Saint John, New Brunswick, Canada

History
- Built: 1777

Site notes
- Website: Fort Howe

National Historic Site of Canada
- Designated: 1914

Fort Howe (1777 — present historic site) was a British fort built in Saint John, Nova Scotia, (Note: In the part of Nova Scotia that became New Brunswick in 1784) during the American Revolution. It was erected shortly after the American siege in 1777 to protect the city from further American raids. The 18th and 19th century British Army fortification stood at the mouth of the Saint John River where it empties into the Bay of Fundy. A replica blockhouse has been constructed approximately 250 metres to the northeast of the original structure.

The fort initially held eight cannons, barracks for 100 men, two blockhouses, and an outer wall composed of fascines, sticks and sod. By 1778, the fort consisted of a more substantial blockhouse and barracks located within a palisade, as well as an abatis. A further third blockhouse was constructed at the east end of the hill, which was the continuation of a ridge formed by the St. Croix Highlands - a coastal extension of the Appalachian Mountains along the north shore of the Bay of Fundy. Upon completion of the fort the British Army named it "Fort Howe", after Sir William Howe, Commander-in-Chief of the British Army in America between 1775 and 1778. The fortification provided watch over the strategic river mouth and offered protection for surrounding rural communities from American privateers and marauding forces.

== History ==
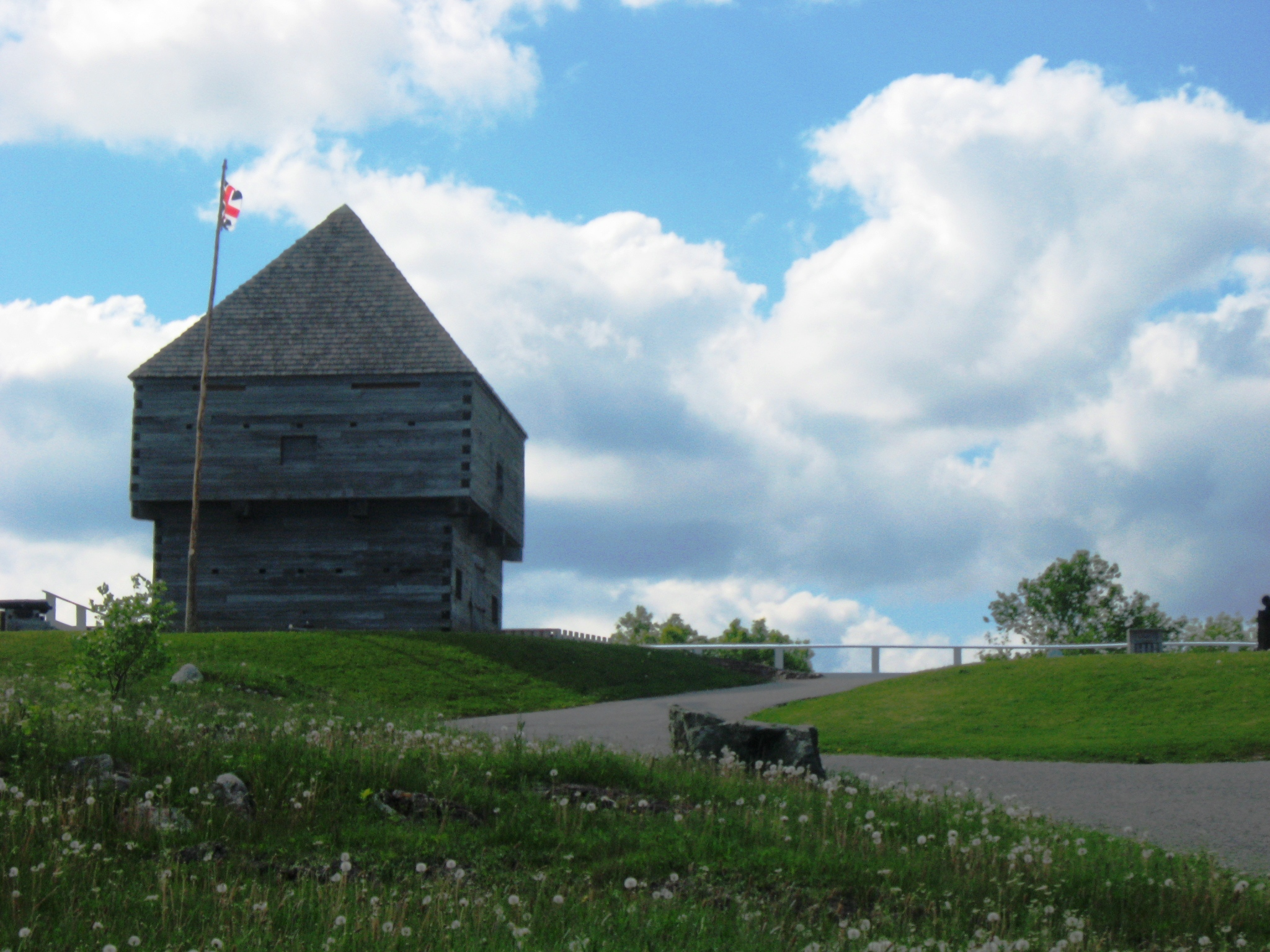
Fort Howe pictured in 2006

=== American Revolution ===
Early on in the American Revolution, the Americans made a land attack on Nova Scotia in the Battle of Fort Cumberland. After the battle, the Americans again tried to attack Nova Scotia with the Siege of Saint John (1777). Ninety Americans, under the leadership of former Nova Scotian Col. John Allan, arrived at the mouth of the Saint John River. This advanced guard was to fortify their base and await the arrival of the main body of troops. The Americans took a number of British prisoner. American privateers and Indians threatened settlers on the Saint John River.

In response, Major John Small personally led a force to drive out the Americans. On June 30, 1777, under the command of Captain Hawker, four British ship with the 84th Regiment of Foot (Royal Highland Emigrants) arrived on the scene under the command of Major Gilfred Studholme. When the 84th Regiment landed at Saint John on June 30, 1777, the Americans retreated to the woods. The 84th marched through the woods and were ambushed by the American. Twelve Americans and one member of the regiment were killed. The 84th overcame Allan's force at Aukpaque (near Fredericton), some of its baggage and arms taken, but only three Americans captured. The Saint John estuary was later plundered again, when Fort Howe was erected there and garrisoned with fifty men under Studholme.

Weeks later, on July 13, 1777, American privateers again attacked Saint John and were repulsed by the 84th. In August 1777, the Americans attacked yet again and were successful, carrying off 21 boatloads of plunder. As a result, Major Gilfred Studholme arrived in Saint John harbour in November 1777 with orders either to repair Fort Frederick or to build a new fort. Because of the low-lying position of Fort Frederick and the damage done to it by the rebels the previous year, Studholme decided to erect a new fortification, and his 50 men, helped by local inhabitants, began the construction of Fort Howe.

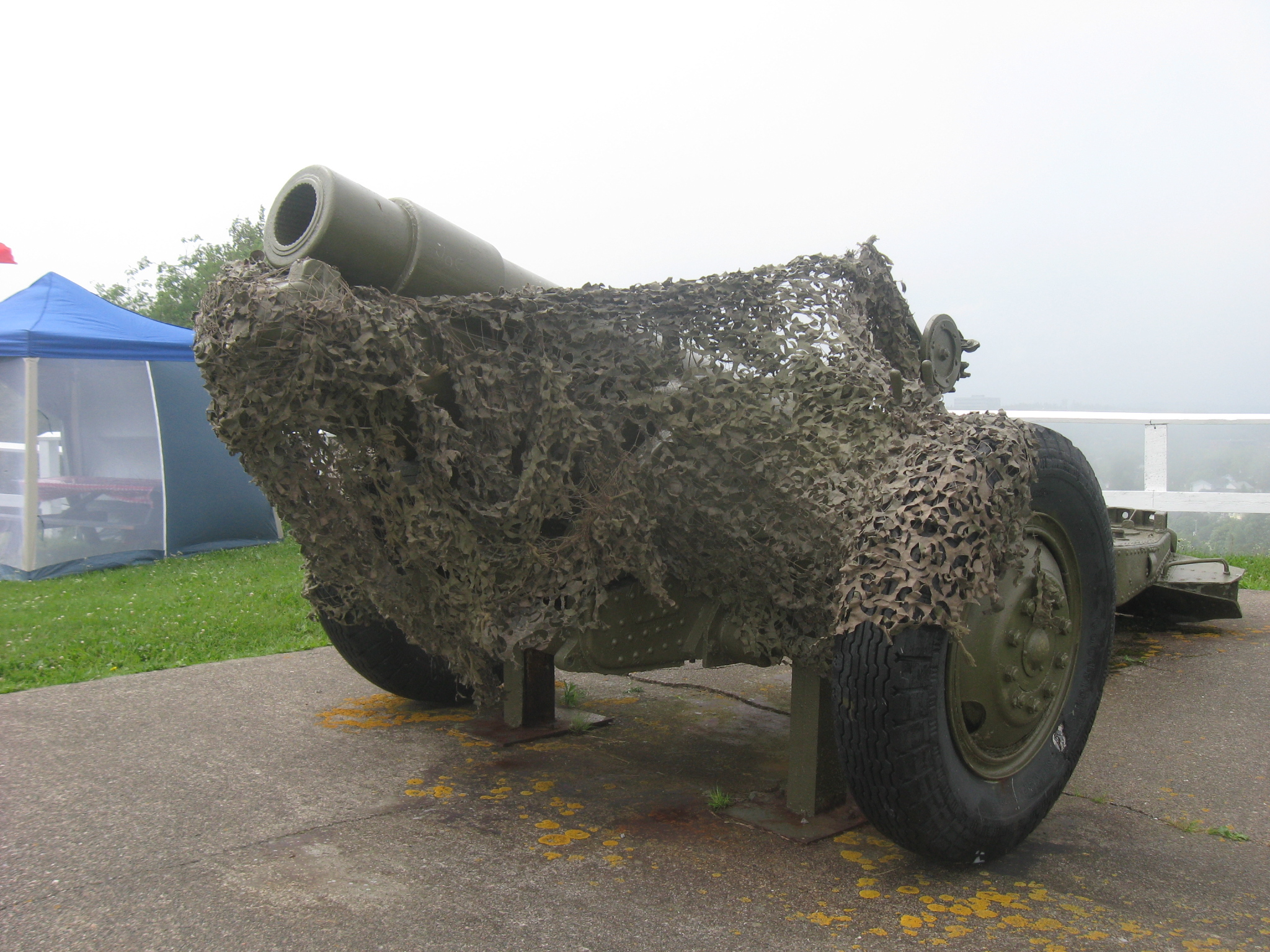
World War II era medium field howitzer

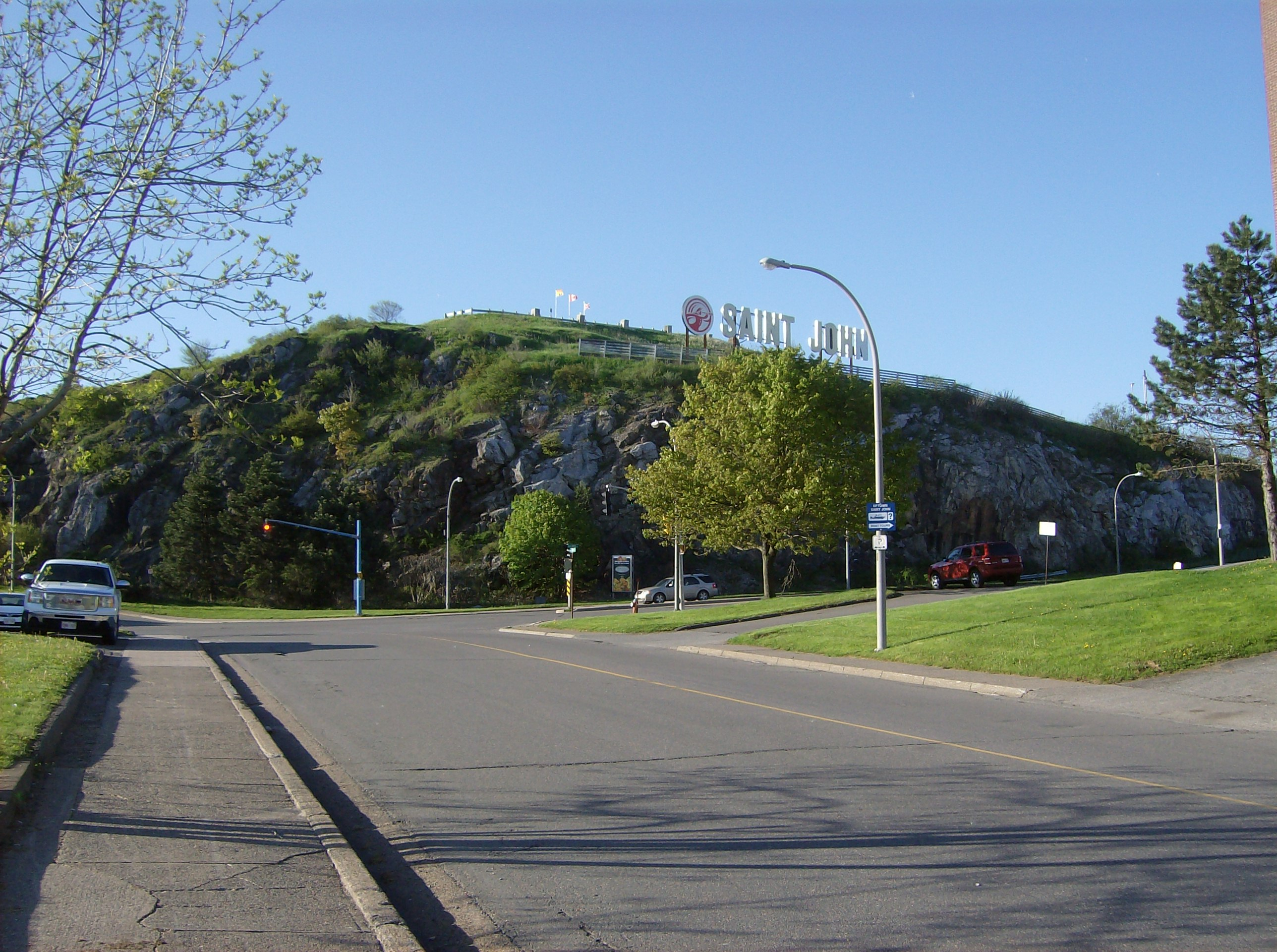
Fort Howe hillside

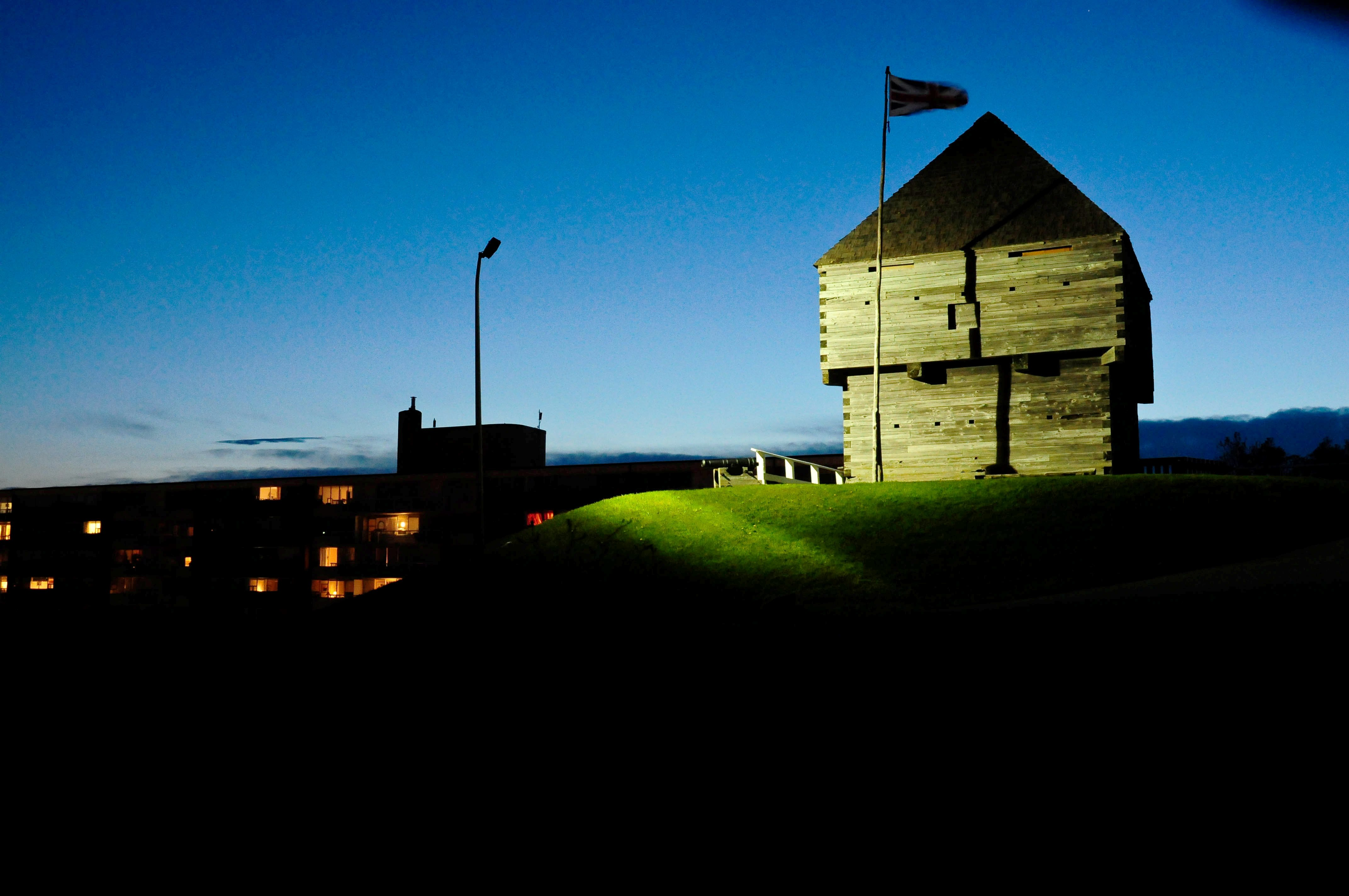
Fort Howe blockhouse at sunset

Following the signing of the Treaty of Paris in 1783, numerous Loyalist refugees from the American Revolutionary War moved to the area surrounding Fort Howe because of the protection it afforded, founding the communities of Parrtown and Carleton. Fort Howe became the military headquarters for the area of the lower Saint John River valley.

In 1784, the British government responded to the wishes of the Loyalists settling in the area by designating the entire portion of the colony of Nova Scotia north of the Bay of Fundy as the new colony of New Brunswick. The cannons of Fort Howe were fired (on a rare occasion) on November 21, 1784, when they offered a 17-gun salute welcoming the colony's first governor, Brigadier General Thomas Carleton (officially governor from 1786 to 1817).

In 1785, Parrtown and Carleton were merged by royal charter to form the city of Saint John. Fort Howe served as the first civic jail for the municipality. Fort Howe's cannon batteries were again fired in celebration upon hearing news of Admiral Nelson's 1805 victory at the Battle of Trafalgar.

=== War of 1812 ===
A series of defences to guard Saint John Harbour were developed in response to the Napoleonic Wars. Fort Howe became the linchpin in a system consisting of itself (protecting the river narrows), the Carleton Martello Tower, guarding the harbour from another rise on the west side of the river, and Fort Dufferin, guarding the harbour entrance near Partridge Island. Fort Howe's barracks also housed British Army troops and Royal Navy sailors who participated in raids along the coastline of present-day Washington and Penobscot counties in Maine (then part of Massachusetts), and provided support to an important blockhouse guarding the frontier on the St. Croix River at St. Andrews.

Fort Howe's cannons were again fired in celebration upon news of the Duke of Wellington's victory at the Battle of Waterloo in 1815. Following the War of 1812, Fort Howe fell into disuse as more modern defence facilities were better able to defend Saint John from attack, notably the Martello Tower on the west side of the harbour. It, like Fort Dufferin were allowed to gradually deteriorate over the ensuing century as nature reclaimed the land and buildings. Following Confederation in 1867, most British troops were removed from the city in favour of domestic militia and remaining harbour defences were largely abandoned in place.

=== World War 2 ===
The Second World War saw the site of Fort Howe host its final military activities when the Canadian 8th Anti-Aircraft Battery placed a 3.7 inch gun atop the hill overlooking the river mouth as part of Canada's coastal defence plan. The Canadian Army's Ordnance Corps also built an instrument repair shop nearby. Following the war, the last blockhouse and this repair shop were lost to fire and the site was mostly levelled.

== National Park and National Historic Site ==
Fort Howe has the distinction of being the first historic site in the national park system. The site was designated a National Historic Park, named Fort Howe National Park, on March 30, 1914 partly at the urging of James B. Harkin, first Commissioner of Dominion (National) Parks. It had been federal property already, under the Department of Militia and Defence, making the transition easier. One rationale for its creation was to introduce the national park concept to eastern populations, but its historic resources proved problematic. For one, the Parks Branch had no experience managing a historic site, and its primary concern was to create an urban recreational park. Historic resources were incidental. For another, Fort Howe itself "was not a very important historic site", and was used to acquire "undistinguished property."

Its tentative creation, along with a recommendation to establish Beaver Dams National Battlefield Park (1914) and the formation of Fort Anne National Park (1917), provided some of the impetus for the Parks Branch to formalize its heritage policy. One significant result of this was the creation of the Historic Sites and Monuments Board of Canada in 1919, an advisory body which would assess historic sites.

Early on, Harkin was uncomfortable with Fort Howe in the park system, and, with the site deemed inferior to others more worthy of inclusion, and "never very successful", the fort was eventually given to the city of Saint John in 1930, abolishing the national park. In 1966, Fort Howe was designated a National Historic Site on the advice of the federal historic sites board, but did not rejoin the national park system. Since then, there have been several schemes to rebuild the fortification in its entirety to depict its hey-day during the American Revolutionary War.

As part of the city's commemoration of the centennial of Confederation in 1967, the Saint John chapter of the Imperial Order Daughters of the Empire and the city erected a full-size replica of one of Fort Howe's blockhouses upon the site. Several original or replica 18th century cannons, as well as one of the Second World War anti-aircraft batteries, are located on the site, which is a popular lookout for tourists and residents in the hill-top park overlooking the city and harbour.

The fort is affiliated with the Canadian Museums Association, the Canadian Heritage Information Network, and the Virtual Museum of Canada.
