= 7th General Assembly of Nova Scotia =

A writ for the election of the 7th General Assembly of Nova Scotia was issued on Jan. 22, 1793, returnable by March 20, 1793. The assembly convened on March 20, 1793, held seven sessions, and was dissolved on October 11, 1799.

== Sessions ==
Dates of specific sessions are under research.

== Governor and Council ==
- Governor-in-Chief of British North America:
  - Guy Carleton
  - Robert Prescott -named December 15, 1796
  - Sir Robert Milnes -named July 30, 1799
    - Lieutenant Governor: Sir John Wentworth

Technically, Gov. Carleton was appointed not as governor general, but as Governor of Quebec, New Brunswick, Nova Scotia, and St. John's Island (four simultaneous appointments). Since a governor only has power when actually in their jurisdiction, the three additional appointments were effectively meaningless, with Lt. Gov. Wentworth serving as acting governor.

The members of the Council are currently under research.

== House of Assembly ==
=== Officers ===
- Speaker of the House:
  - Thomas Henry Barclay of Annapolis Township -resigned June 7, 1799
  - Richard John Uniacke of Queens County -elected June 7, 1799.
- Clerk of the House: James Boutineau Francklin
- Sergeant at Arms: Adolphus Veith -appointed March 10, 1790

=== Division of seats ===
The customary assignment of seats was continued: 4 seats assigned to Halifax County, 2 seats to the other counties and to Halifax Township, and 1 seat to the other townships, for a total of 39 seats.

=== Members ===
| Electoral District | Name | First elected / previously elected | Notes |
|---|---|---|---|
| Amherst Township | Thomas Lusby | 1793 | |
| Annapolis County | Thomas Millidge | 1793 | |
| Annapolis County | James Moody | 1793 | |
| Annapolis Township | Thomas Barclay | 1793 | resigned June 7, 1799, appointed Consul-General in New York for the North Eastern States of America. |
| Barrington Township | John Sargent | 1793 | took seat March 25, 1793. |
| Cornwallis Township | William Baxter | 1793 | |
| Cumberland County | William Freeman | 1793 | |
| Cumberland County | Samuel Embrie | 1793 | |
| Digby Township | Henry Rutherford | 1793 | |
| Falmouth Township | Jeremiah Northup | 1775 | |
| Granville Township | Alexander Howe | 1793 | |
| Halifax County | Jonathan Sterns | 1793 | died May 23, 1798. |
| Halifax County | James Stewart (1798) | 1798 | by-election June 15, 1798, took seat June 15, 1798. |
| Halifax County | James Michael Freke Bulkeley | 1793 | died November 13, 1796. |
| Halifax County | Charles Morris | 1788, 1797 | by-election February 13, 1797, took seat June 6, 1797. |
| Halifax County | Lawrence Hartshorne | 1793 | |
| Halifax County | Michael Wallace | 1785 | |
| Halifax Township | John George Pyke | 1793 | |
| Halifax Township | William Cochran | 1785 | |
| Hants County | Hector MacLean | 1793 | |
| Hants County | William Cottnam Tonge | 1793 | |
| Horton Township | Samuel Leonard | 1793 | |
| Kings County | Jonathan Crane | 1784 | election declared invalid March 30, 1793. |
| Kings County | Benjamin Belcher | 1793 | declared elected and took seat March 30, 1793. |
| Kings County | Elisha DeWolf | 1793 | |
| Liverpool Township | Samuel Hart | 1793 | |
| Londonderry Township | Robert McElhinney | 1790 | |
| Lunenburg County | John William Schwartz | 1773 | |
| Lunenburg County | Edward James | 1793 | |
| Lunenburg Township | John Bolman | 1793 | |
| Newport Township | Shubael Dimock | 1793 | |
| Onslow Township | Charles Dickson | 1776 | died September 3, 1796. |
| Onslow Township | Daniel Eaton (1797) | 1797 | by-election, took seat June 6, 1797. |
| Queens County | Simeon Perkins | 1765 | took seat March 25, 1793. |
| Queens County | Benajah Collins | 1784 | took seat June 30, 1794. Resigned and left for Danvers, Massachusetts, September 1797. |
| Queens County | Richard John Uniacke (1798) | 1798 | by-election, took seat June 8, 1798 |
| Shelburne County | Stephen Skinner | 1793 | took seat March 25, 1793. |
| Shelburne County | James Humphreys | 1793 | took seat March 25, 1793. Returned to Philadelphia in 1797. |
| Shelburne County | George Gracie (1798) | 1798 | by-election, took seat June 15, 1798. |
| Shelburne Township | Colin Campbell | 1793 | took seat March 25, 1793. |
| Sydney County | John Stuart | 1793 | took seat March 25, 1793. |
| Sydney County | Thomas Cutler | 1793 | took seat June 6, 1794. |
| Truro Township | Matthew Archibald | 1785 | |
| Windsor Township | John McMonagle | 1785 | |
| Yarmouth Township | Samuel Sheldon Poole | 1785 | took seat April 5, 1793. |

Note: Unless otherwise noted, members were elected at the general election, and took their seats at the convening of the assembly. By-elections are special elections held to fill specific vacancies. When a member is noted as having taking their seat on a certain date, but a by-election isn't noted, the member was elected at the general election but arrived late.

| Preceded by 6th General Assembly of Nova Scotia | General Assemblies of Nova Scotia; 1794–1799 | Succeeded by 8th General Assembly of Nova Scotia |
