= 6th General Assembly of Nova Scotia =

The 6th General Assembly of Nova Scotia represented Nova Scotia between November 1785 to 1793.

The Assembly sat at the pleasure of the Governor of Nova Scotia, Edmund Fanning until 1786, and then under Governor John Parr.

== Sessions ==
In 1785, the Speaker of the House was Sampson Salter Blowers In 1789, the speaker was Richard John Uniacke. A writ for the election of the 6th General Assembly of Nova Scotia was issued on 21 October 1785, returnable by 1 December 1785. The assembly convened on 5 December 1785, held seven sessions, and was dissolved on 22 January 1793.

== Governor and Council ==
At the convening of the assembly:

- Governor: John Parr
  - Lieutenant Governor: Edmund Fanning

After April 1786:

- Governor-in-Chief of British North America: Guy Carleton
  - Lieutenant Governor: John Parr -died 25 November 1791
    - Administrator: Richard Bulkeley -served as acting governor
  - Lieutenant Governor: Sir John Wentworth -named 14 May 1792

Technically, Gov. Carleton was appointed not as governor general, but as Governor of Quebec, New Brunswick, Nova Scotia, and St. John's Island (four simultaneous appointments). Since a governor only has power when actually in their jurisdiction, the three additional appointments were effectively meaningless, with Lt. Gov. Parr serving as acting governor.

The members of the Council are currently under research.

== House of Assembly ==
=== Officers ===
- Speaker of the House:
  - Sampson Salter Blowers of Halifax County -appointed to Council 3 January 1788.
  - Richard John Uniacke of Halifax County -elected 5 March 1789.
- Clerk of the House: James Boutineau Francklin
- Sergeant at Arms: Adolphus Veith -appointed 10 March 1790

=== Division of seats ===
The customary assignment of seats was continued: 4 seats assigned to Halifax County, 2 seats to the other counties and to Halifax Township, and 1 seat to the other townships, for a total of 39 seats.

Sunbury County, Sackville Township and Cumberland Township were no longer represented, as they had become part of the Province of New Brunswick in 1784. Digby Township, Shelburne Township, Shelburne County, and Sydney County had been newly established and were granted representation.

=== Members ===
Electoral District	Name	First elected / previously elected	Notes
Amherst Township	William Freeman	1783	election declared invalid 9 December 1785, not an inhabitant.
Amherst Township	Charles Hill (1786)	1786	by-election, took seat 8 June 1786.
Annapolis County	Thomas Henry Barclay	1785	
Annapolis County	David Seabury	1785	election declared invalid 8 December 1785, re-elected, took seat 10 June 1786, election again declared invalid 15 June 1786.
Annapolis County	Alexander Howe (1786)	1786	declared duly elected, took seat 15 June 1786.
Annapolis Township	Col. Stephen De Lancey	1784	appointed to office in the Bahamas, seat declared vacant 6 April 1789.
Annapolis Township	James Delancey (1790)	1790	by-election, took seat 26 February 1790.
Barrington Township	Joseph Aplin	1785	took seat 21 December 1785, seat declared vacant 6 April 1789, having been out of the province for two years.
Barrington Township	Gideon White (1790)	1790	by-election, took seat 1 March 1790.
Cornwallis Township	Benjamin Belcher	1785	took seat 8 December 1785.
Cumberland County	John Butler Dight	1785	
Cumberland County	Christopher Harper	1785	seat declared vacant 7 December 1785, not an inhabitant.
Cumberland County	Philip Marchington (1786)	1786	by-election, took seat 8 June 1786.
Cumberland County	Thomas Watson	1785	improperly elected due to error in the writ. He petitioned on 14 June 1786 to take Harper's seat, but Marchington had already been seated.
Digby Township	Thomas Millidge	1785	took seat 10 June 1786.
Falmouth Township	Jeremiah Northup	1775	apology for non-attendance accepted on 16 June 1791.
Granville Township	Benjamin James	1785	
Halifax County	Sampson Salter Blowers	1785	appointed to Council 3 January 1788.
Halifax County	Charles Morris (1788)	1785	by-election, 22 February 1788, took seat 12 March 1789.
Halifax County	Richard John Uniacke	1785	
Halifax County	John George Pyke	1779	
Halifax County	Michael Wallace	1785	
Halifax Township	John Fillis	1785	
Halifax Township	William Cochran	1785	
Hants County	Benjamin DeWolf	1782	
Hants County	Winckworth Tonge	1785	died 2 February 1792.
Hants County	George Henry Monk (1792)	1792	by-election, took seat 18 June 1792.
Horton Township	Gurdon Denison	1785	apology for non-attendance accepted on 23 June 1791.
Kings County	Jonathan Crane	1784	
Kings County	Elisha Lawrence	1785	resolved 6 April 1789 seat to be declared vacant if he did not attend the next session, but he did attend.
Liverpool Township	Ephraim Dean	1785	died on 27 January 1787.
Liverpool Township	George William Sherlock (1787)	1787	by-election, 14 March 1787, took seat 25 October 1787. Election declared invalid 13 November 1787, reelected 11 December 1787, took seat 5 March 1789.
Londonderry Township	James Smith	1785	seat declared vacant 6 April 1789 as a public defaulter.
Londonderry Township	Robert McElhinney (1790)	1790	by-election, took seat 25 February 1790.
Lunenburg County	Dettlieb Christopher Jessen	1785	
Lunenburg County	John William Schwartz	1773	
Lunenburg Township	Casper Wollenhaupt	1783	
Newport Township	John Day Jr.	1785	resigned 8 June 1791, appointed sheriff of Hants County.
Newport Township	William Cottnam Tonge (1792)	1792	by-election, took seat 8 June 1792.
Onslow Township	Charles Dickson	1776	took seat 12 December 1785.
Queens County	Simeon Perkins	1765	
Queens County	Benajah Collins	1784	took seat 17 June 1786.
Shelburne County	Alexander Leckie	1785	took seat 17 December 1785 after election was contested and declared valid.
Shelburne County	Charles McNeal	1785	took seat 17 December 1785 after election was contested and declared valid.
Shelburne Township	Isaac Wilkins	1785	took seat 17 December 1785 after election was contested and declared valid.
Sydney County	James Michael Freke Bulkeley	1785	took seat 8 June 1786.
Sydney County	James Putnam	1785	took seat 8 June 1787.
Truro Township	Matthew Archibald	1785	
Windsor Township	John McMonagle	1785	
Yarmouth Township	Samuel Sheldon Poole	1785	

Note: Unless otherwise noted, members were elected at the general election, and took their seats at the convening of the assembly. By-elections are special elections held to fill specific vacancies. When a member is noted as having taking their seat on a certain date, but a by-election isn't noted, the member was elected at the general election but arrived late.

Preceded by 5th General Assembly of Nova Scotia	General Assemblies of Nova Scotia; 1785–1793	Succeeded by 7th General Assembly of Nova Scotia
