= Attorney General Uniacke =

Attorney General Uniacke may refer to:

- James Boyle Uniacke (1799–1858), Attorney General of Nova Scotia
- Richard John Uniacke (1753–1830), Attorney General of Nova Scotia
- Richard John Uniacke Jr. (1789–1834), Attorney General of the Colony of Cape Breton Island
