= Samuel Hart =

Samuel Hart may refer to:

- Samuel Hart (merchant) (1747–1810), American merchant and politician, member of the General Assembly of Nova Scotia
- Samuel Hart (priest) (1845–1917), American Episcopal clergyman
- Sam Hart (born 1996), English footballer
- Samuel Beecher Hart (1863–1936), American legislator from Pennsylvania
- Samuel Hart, a character on the British soap opera Family Affairs
