= Judge Seabury =

- Judge Samuel Seabury (1873–1958) of the New York Court of Appeals
- Judge David Seabury of the Inferior Court of Common Pleas for Annapolis County, Nova Scotia
