= 7th Nova Scotia general election =

7th Nova Scotia general election may refer to:

- Nova Scotia general election, 1793, the 7th general election to take place in the Colony of Nova Scotia, for the 7th General Assembly of Nova Scotia
- 1890 Nova Scotia general election, the 29th overall general election for Nova Scotia, for the (due to a counting error in 1859) 30th Legislative Assembly of Nova Scotia, but considered the 7th general election for the Canadian province of Nova Scotia
