= 6th Nova Scotia general election =

6th Nova Scotia general election may refer to:

- Nova Scotia general election, 1785, the 6th general election to take place in the Colony of Nova Scotia, for the 6th General Assembly of Nova Scotia
- Nova Scotia general election, 1886, the 28th overall general election for Nova Scotia, for the (due to a counting error in 1859) 29th Legislative Assembly of Nova Scotia, but considered the 6th general election for the Canadian province of Nova Scotia
