= Norman Fitzgerald Uniacke =

Canadian politician

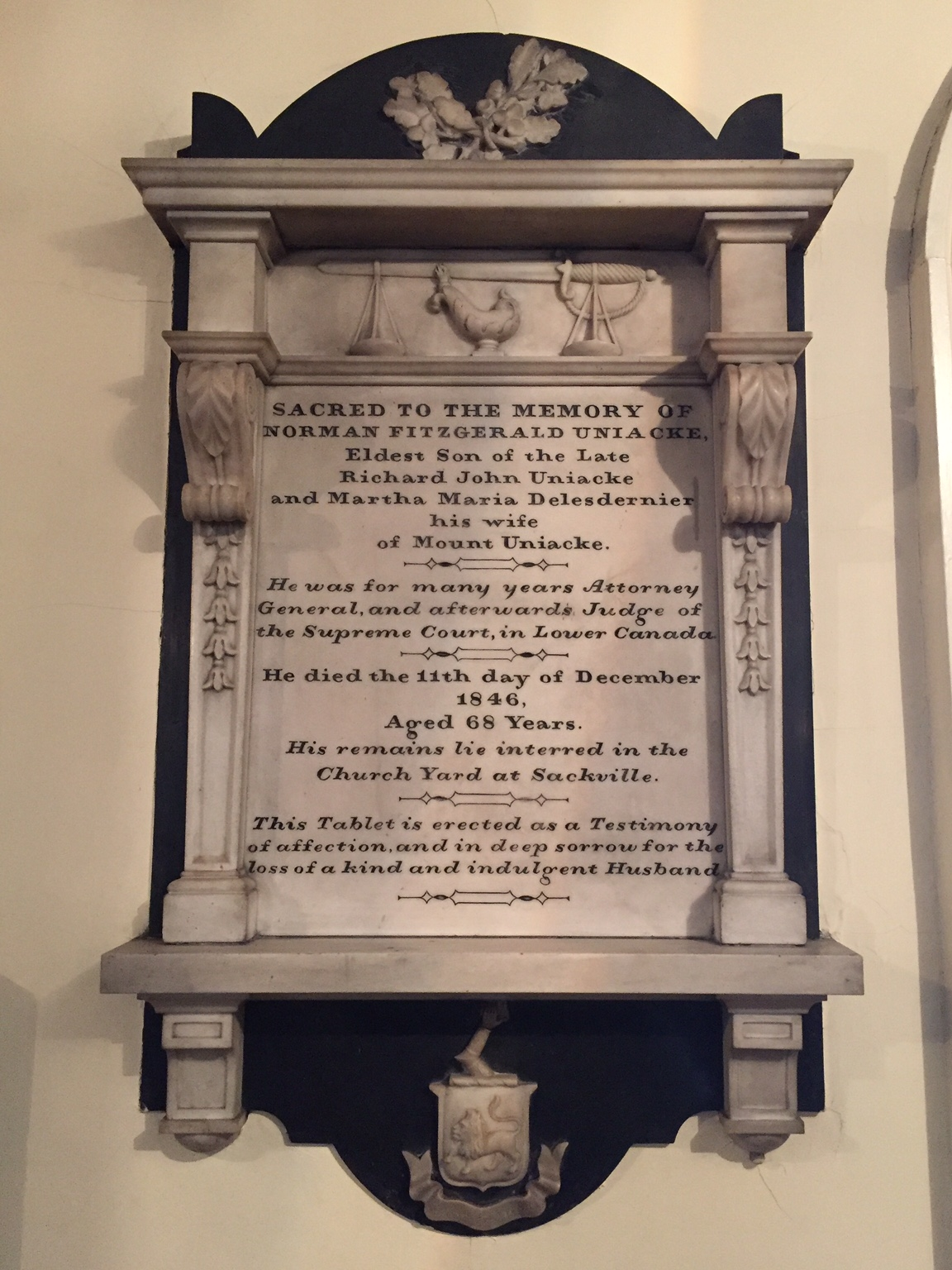
Norman Fitzgerald Uniacke, St. Paul's Church, Halifax, Nova Scotia

Norman Fitzgerald Uniacke (ca 1777 – December 11, 1846) was a lawyer, judge and political figure in Lower Canada and Nova Scotia. He represented William-Henry in the Legislative Assembly of Lower Canada from 1824 to 1825.

He was born, probably in Halifax, the son of Richard John Uniacke and Martha Maria Delesdernier. Uniacke was named a lieutenant in the militia in 1796. He was called to the Nova Scotia bar and then went to London, where he studied at Lincoln's Inn and was called to the English bar. He was named Attorney General of Lower Canada in 1809. Governor James Henry Craig, who opposed Uniacke's appointment, suspended him from that post in 1810. Uniacke resumed his duties in 1812 after Craig was replaced by George Prevost. In 1825, he was named a judge in the Court of King's Bench for Montreal district. He served as judge for Trois-Rivières district in 1827 during the absence of Pierre-Stanislas Bédard. Uniacke also served as justice of the peace. He married Sophie Delesdernier in 1829. He retired from the bench in 1834 and returned to Nova Scotia. He was named to the Legislative Council of Nova Scotia in 1838. Uniacke died in Halifax.

His brothers James Boyle and Richard John, Jr. served in the Nova Scotia provincial assembly. James Boyle was also the first Premier of Nova Scotia.
