= Robert Denison =

American politician

Robert Denison (1697–1766) was a soldier and political figure in Connecticut and Nova Scotia. He was elected to the Connecticut General Assembly in 1737, 1742, 1751 and 1756. He was a leader of the New England Planters who settled Nova Scotia and represented King's County in the Nova Scotia House of Assembly from 1761 to 1764.

== Early life ==
He was born in Mohegan (later Montville, Connecticut), the son of Robert Denison and Joanna Stanton. He served in the New England militia in campaigns against the French and native peoples. In 1721, he married Deborah Griswold. He married Prudence Sherman in 1733 after the death of his first wife.

== Military career ==
In 1745, Denison was captain of a company that took part in the Siege of Louisbourg (1745). During the French and Indian War, he participated in the Battle of Lake George. In 1759, he received a grant of land in Horton Township, Nova Scotia; the land had been vacated following the Expulsion of the Acadians. He was named lieutenant colonel for the local militia and became a justice of the peace for the county the following year. In 1761, he was named a justice for the Inferior Court of Common Pleas. Denison resigned his seat in the assembly on April 3, 1764 and died in late June or early July the following year at Horton (now Hortonville).

His son Gurdon also served in the provincial assembly.

His great-great grandson was the Canadian prime minister Sir Robert Borden.

== See also ==
- Military history of Nova Scotia
