= Moses Delesdernier =

Swiss-Canadian author (c. 1713 – 1811)

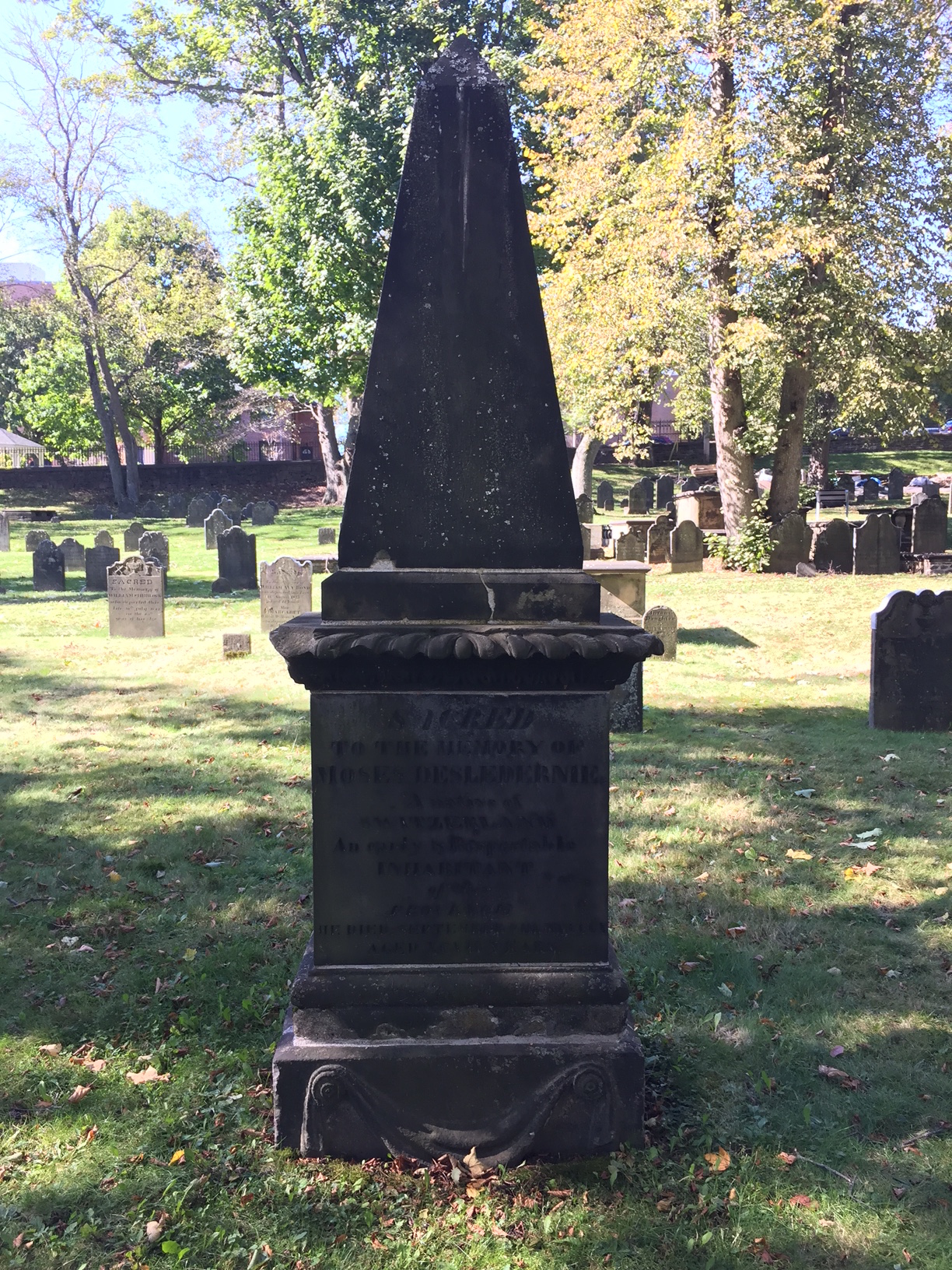
Moses Delesdernier, Old Burying Ground (Halifax, Nova Scotia)

Moses Delesdernier (c.1713-1811) was land trader and author who moved from Switzerland to Halifax, Nova Scotia (1750). In 1754, while at Pisiquid (present-day Windsor, Nova Scotia), he was the first Protestant to farm among the Acadians. He was also the truckmaster for trade with the Mi’kmaq (1760). He also held office in present-day New Brunswick and Prince Edward Island. Delesdernier met Richard John Uniacke in Philadelphia and encouraged him to settle in Nova Scotia (1774). Delesdernier became Uniacke's father-in-law (1775). The following year Delesdernier's son and son-in-law Uniacke became involved in the Eddy Rebellion and, as a result, Delesdernier fell into disfavour with the government.

Delesdernier also wrote two manuscripts that were used by Andrew Brown in his history of Nova Scotia. He is buried in the Old Burying Ground (Halifax, Nova Scotia). Headstone pictured at right.
