= Richard John Uniacke Jr. =

Canadian politician

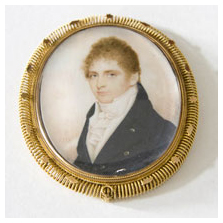
Richard John Uniacke Jr. (son of Richard John Uniacke) by Robert Field, Uniake Estate Museum

Richard John Uniacke (June 6, 1789 – February 21, 1834) was a lawyer, judge and political figure in Nova Scotia. He represented Cape Breton County in the Nova Scotia House of Assembly from 1820 to 1830.

He was born in Halifax, Nova Scotia, the son of Richard John Uniacke and Martha Maria Delesdernier who was the daughter of Moses Delesdernier. He was educated at King's College in Windsor, went on to study law and was called to the bar in 1810. Uniacke went to Cape Breton Island, then a separate colony, in 1813. He was named to the Executive Council and became acting attorney general. From 1815 to 1816, he served as the island's acting chief justice. He resigned his appointments in Cape Breton and returned to Halifax where he became advocate general of the vice admiralty court in 1819, succeeding his father.

== The Trial ==
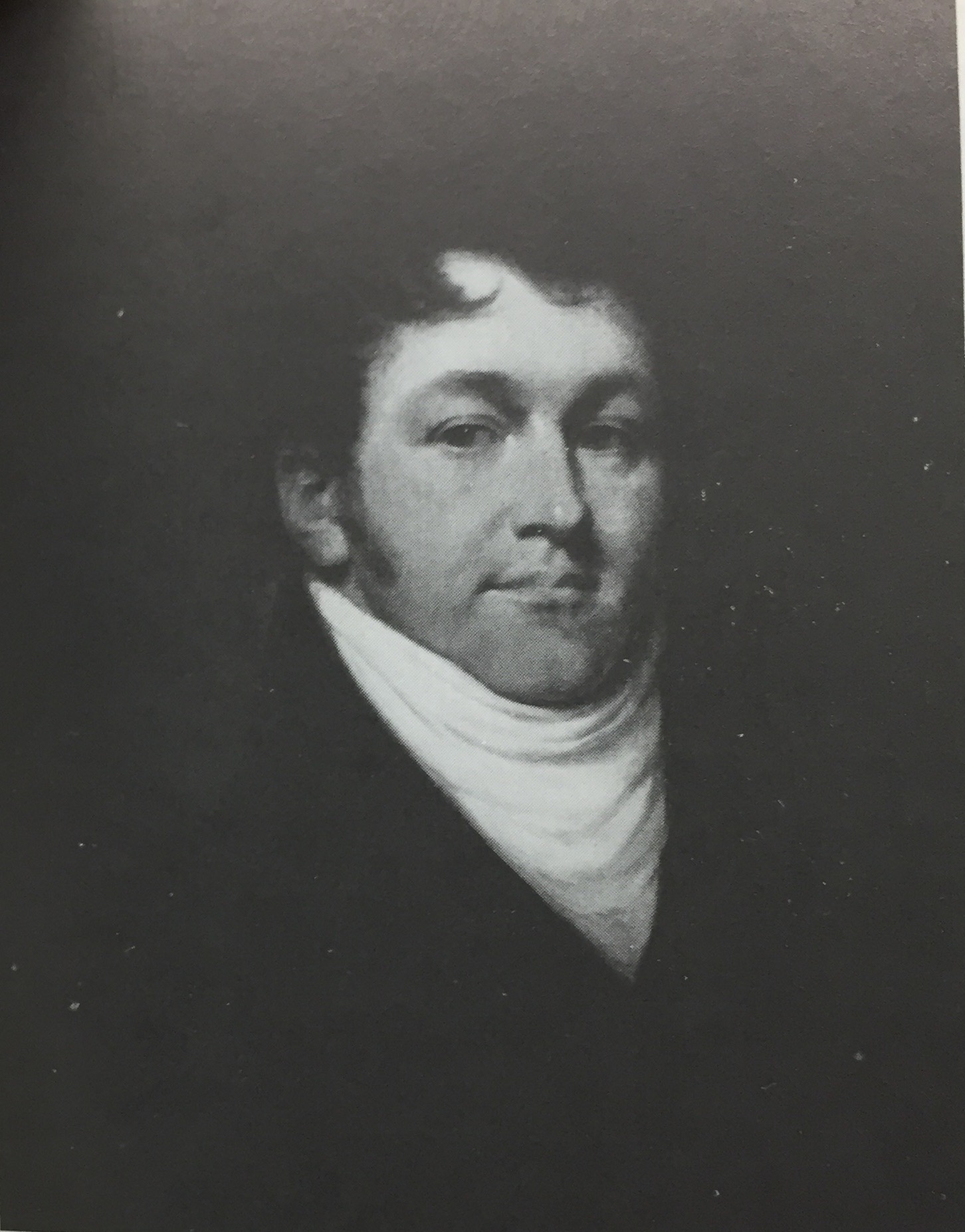
William Bowie by Robert Field NS Archives

On July 21, 1819, he took part in the last known fatal duel in Nova Scotia. William Bowie (merchant), a Halifax merchant, was fatally wounded (and later buried in Old Burying Ground); Uniacke and his second, Edward McSweeny, were charged with murder. They were prosecuted by Samuel George William Archibald but were acquitted.

In 1820, he was elected to the legislative assembly for Cape Breton, after it was reunited with Nova Scotia. In 1821, he married Mary Ann Hill. Uniacke was named King's Counsel in 1824. In 1830, he was appointed a puisne judge of the Supreme Court of Nova Scotia. He died in Halifax in 1834, reportedly having become deeply depressed after sentencing two men and a woman to death the year before for the murder of the woman's husband.

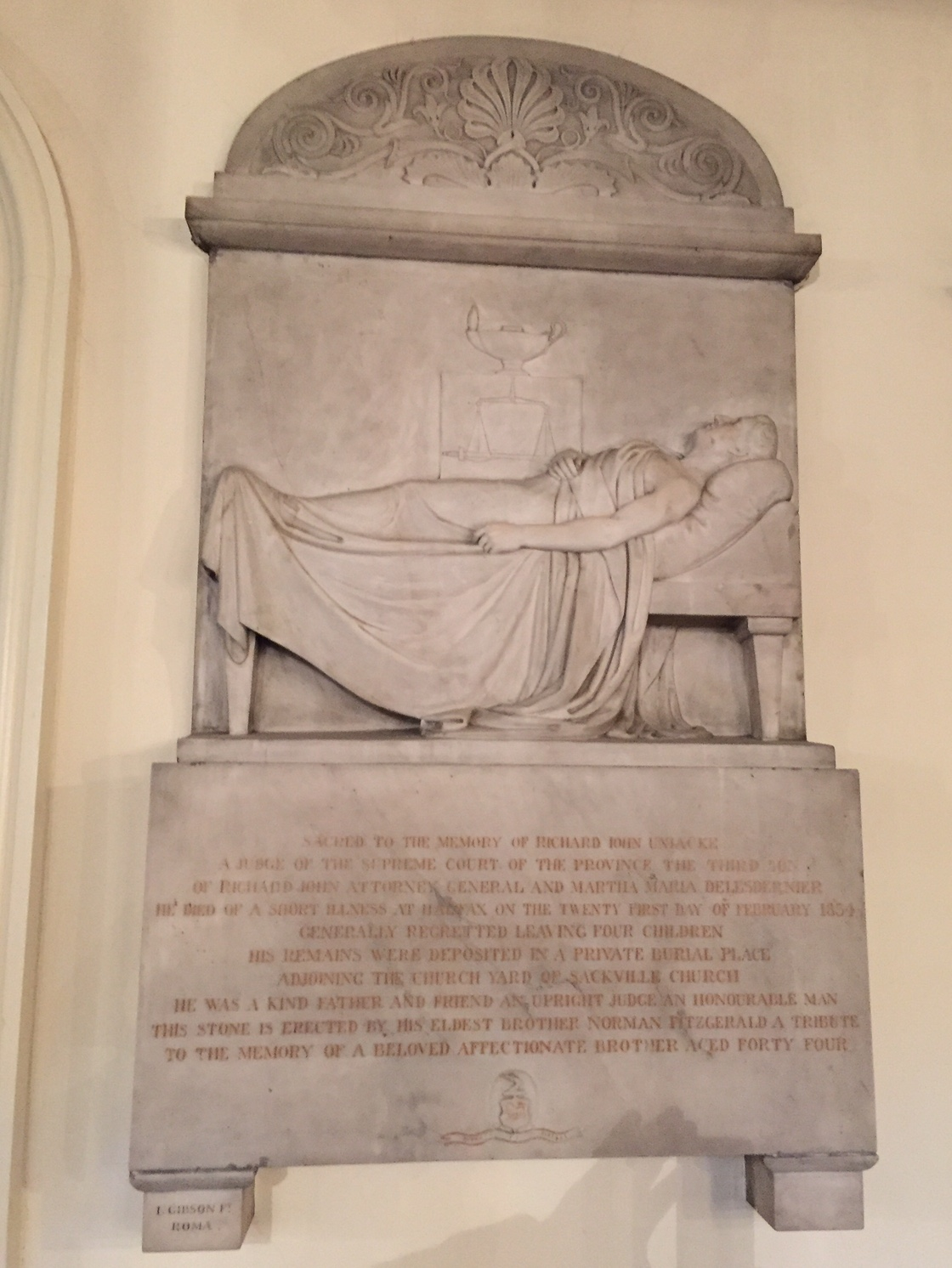
Richard John Uniacke Monument by John Gibson, Via Fontanella Studio, Roma, c. 1830, St. Paul's Church (Halifax); monument commissioned by older brother judge Norman Fitzgerald Uniacke

His brother James Boyle later served as premier of Nova Scotia and his brother Norman Fitzgerald served in the legislative assembly for Lower Canada.
