= Andrew Mitchell Uniacke =

Nova Scotian politician (1808–1895)

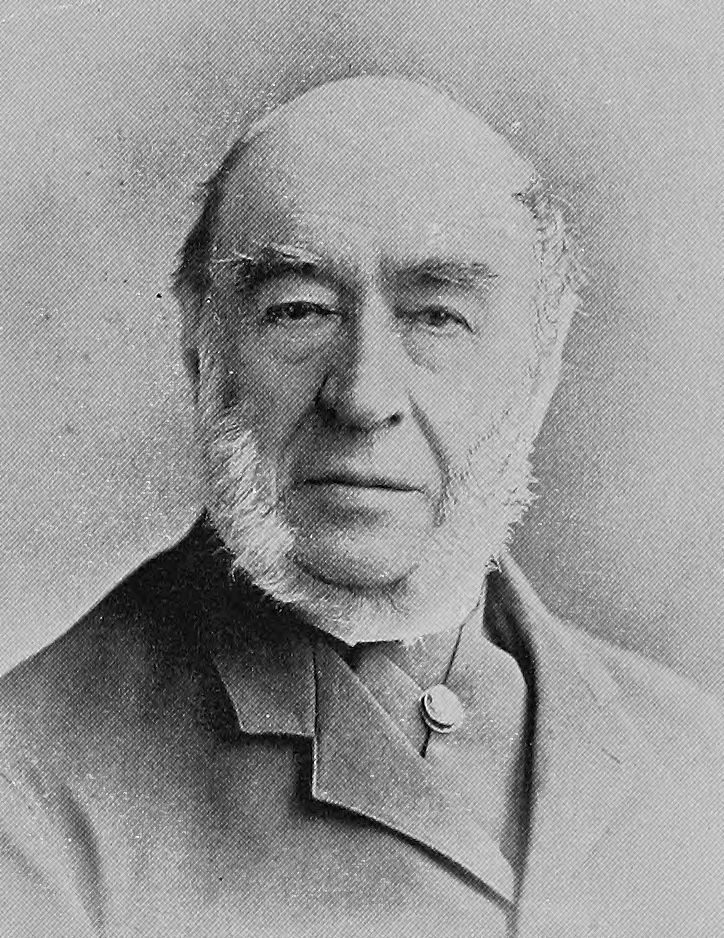
- Born: 9 November 1808; Halifax, Nova Scotia
- Died: 26 July 1895 (aged 86); Dover, Kent
- Spouse: Elizabeth McLean Fraser (m. 1834)

Andrew Mitchell Uniacke (9 November 1808 – 26 July 1895) was a lawyer, banker and politician in Nova Scotia. He represented Halifax township in the Nova Scotia House of Assembly from 1843 to 1847.

He was born in Halifax, the son of Richard John Uniacke (lawyer) and Eliza Newton. His father Richard came to Cumberland County from County Cork, Ireland in 1774. He was educated at King's College and went on to study law. In 1834, he married Elizabeth Fraser. He was president of the Bank of Nova Scotia from 1872 to 1874. He died in Dover, England.

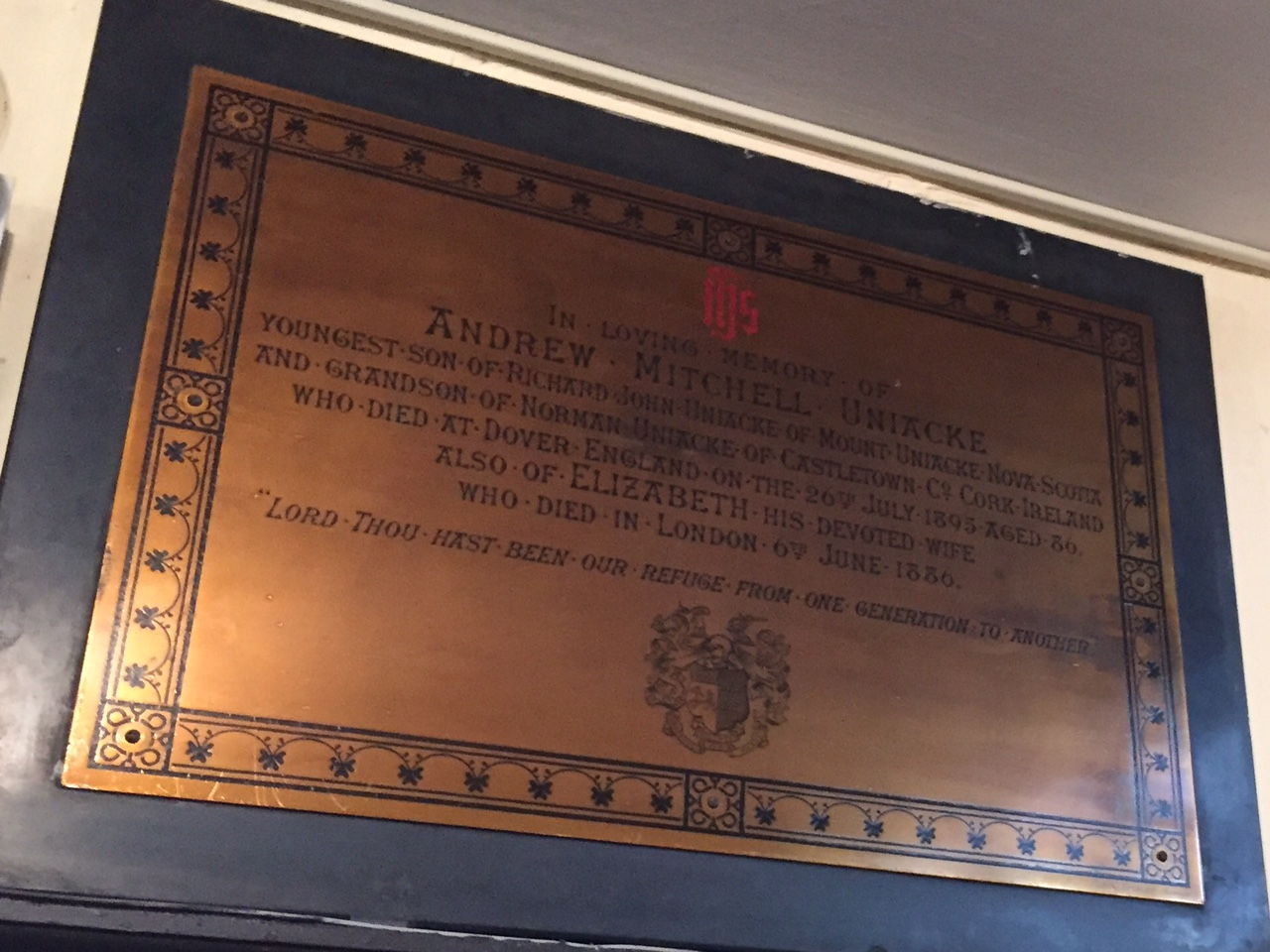
Andrew Mitchell Uniacke, St. Paul's Church (Halifax), Nova Scotia

He was awarded an honorary D.C.L. by Kings College in 1855.
