= David Seabury (politician) =

Canadian politician

Member of the Legislative Assembly of Nova Scotia from Annapolis County
- In office 1786–1793

Justice of the Peace and Inferior Court of Common Pleas of Annapolis County
- In office 1790–1793

Acting Agent for Indian Affairs in Annapolis County
- In office 1805–1806

Personal details
- Born: 1749 Nassau, Province of New York
- Died: September 26, 1840 (aged 90–91) Cornwallis, Nova Scotia, Canada
- Relations: Samuel Seabury (Brother)

David Seabury (christened on September 10, 1749 in Nassau, Province of New York – September 26, 1840) was a tradesman, judge and political figure in Nova Scotia. In 1786, he briefly represented Annapolis County in the Nova Scotia House of Assembly.

== Biography ==
He was born in what is now the United States, the son of the Reverend Samuel Seabury and Elizabeth Powell. His half-brother Samuel was the first bishop of the Episcopal Church in the United States. In 1770, he married Anne Lyne. A United Empire Loyalist, he served as captain in a loyalist regiment during the American Revolution and settled in Granville, Nova Scotia in 1783. Seabury was a lieutenant-colonel in the militia.

He was elected to the 6th General Assembly of Nova Scotia in 1785, but the seat was immediately contested and declared invalid on Dec. 8,1785, three days into the session. He was reelected and took seat June 10, 1786 but the election was again declared invalid June 15, 1786, and the seat awarded to Alexander Howe. In 1790, he was named a judge in the Inferior Court of Common Pleas for Annapolis County. He also served as acting agent for Indian Affairs. In 1806, after suffering financial losses, Seabury returned to New York City.
