= James Humphreys (printer) =

Canadian merchant and politician

James Humphreys (January 15, 1748 – February 2, 1810) was a printer, publisher, merchant and politician in Nova Scotia and Pennsylvania. He represented Shelburne County in the Nova Scotia House of Assembly from 1793 to 1796.

== Early life and education ==
Humphreys was born in Philadelphia, the son of James Humphreys and Susanna Assheton. He studied medicine at the College of Philadelphia but left without completing his degree. Humphreys then apprenticed as a printer with William Bradford.

== Career ==
In 1772, Humphreys established his own business, printing books and a number of pamphlets.

In 1775, he began publishing the Pennsylvania Ledger: or the Virginia, Maryland, Pennsylvania, & New Jersey Weekly Advertiser, a newspaper loyal to the British cause. In 1776, he fled the city but returned in 1777 when the British regained control of Philadelphia during the Philadelphia campaign. He went to New York City in 1778, when the British left the city. In 1785, he moved to Shelburne, Nova Scotia, where he established the Nova-Scotia Packet: and General Advertiser. He also operated as a merchant and was a justice of the peace. Humphreys married Mary Yorke.

By 1797, following the end of the American Revolutionary War and the establishment of the United States as a sovereign nation, he returned to Philadelphia where, after failing to establish another newspaper there, he resumed book printing in partnership with some of his sons and daughters. Humphreys published an 1802 edition of Lyrical Ballads by William Wordsworth and Samuel Taylor Coleridge.

== Death ==
He died in Philadelphia and was buried in the cemetery of Christ Church.
