= Samuel Embrie =

Nova Scotia politician

Samuel Embrie (? - c.1799) was an American-born farmer and political figure in Nova Scotia. He represented Cumberland County in the Legislative Assembly of Nova Scotia from 1847 to 1851. His name also appears as Samuel Embree.

He was born in New York state. In 1777, he married Sarah Hyatt, a loyalist from New York. Embrie was a lieutenant in Colonel Oliver DeLancey's regiment. He left New York in 1783 and settled in Cobequid Mountain.
