= Gurdon Denison =

Nova Scotian physician and politician

Gurdon Denison (1744–1807) was a physician and political figure in Nova Scotia. He represented the Horton Township in the Nova Scotia House of Assembly from 1785 to 1793.

He was the son of Robert Denison and Prudence Sherman. In 1778, he married Catherine Fitzpatrick.
