= Elisha Lawrence (Loyalist) =

British Loyalist politician (1740–1811)

Sheriff of Monmouth County
- In office May 22, 1772 – May 22, 1775
- Preceded by: Joseph Leonard
- Succeeded by: Joseph Leonard

MLA for Kings County
- In office 1785–1793 Serving with Jonathan Crane
- Preceded by: Henry Denny Denson
- Succeeded by: Elisha DeWolf

Personal details
- Born: 1740 Monmouth County, New Jersey
- Died: 1811 (aged 70–71) Cardigan, Wales
- Spouse: Mary Ashfield

Elisha Lawrence (1740 - 1811) was a political figure in New Jersey and Nova Scotia. He represented King's County in the Nova Scotia House of Assembly from 1785 to 1793.

He was born in Monmouth County, New Jersey, the son of John Lawrence. He was the county sheriff at the start of the American Revolution. In 1775, he married Mary Ashfield. Lawrence raised a unit of 500 Loyalists which later became part of the 1st Battalion of the New Jersey Volunteers. In 1777 he was taken prisoner by General John Sullivan on Staten Island; at the end of the war, he retired at the rank of colonel and settled in the Parrsboro area. Lawrence later moved to England and died in Cardigan, Wales.
