= Jonathan Sterns =

Nova Scotian politician (1751–1798)

Jonathan Sterns (April 19, 1751 – May 23, 1798) was a Loyalist from Boston, Solicitor General for Nova Scotia and political figure in Nova Scotia. He represented Halifax County in the Nova Scotia House of Assembly from 1793 to 1798.

He was born in Massachusetts, the son of David Sterns and Ruth Hubbard, and was educated at Harvard University. Sterns married Mehitable Robie in 1785. He married Elizabeth Taylor after his first wife's death. He served as solicitor general from 1797 to 1798.

Sterns accused the Attorney General Richard John Uniacke of being biased against Loyalists in the courts which resulted in a street fight between Sterns and Uniacke in 1798. Sterns was in poor health and died shortly afterwards. The Chief Justice and ally of Sterns, Sampson Salter Blowers, blamed Uniacke for the death and challenged him to a duel which was called off when both men were bound to keep the peace.

Sterns was 47 when died, still holding his office. He is buried in the Old Burying Ground.
