= Samuel Leonard =

Canadian politician

Samuel Leonard (ca 1755 – August 20, 1825) was a United Empire Loyalist and political figure in Nova Scotia. He represented Horton Township from 1793 to 1799 in the Nova Scotia House of Assembly.

He was born in New Jersey and served as a captain in the New Jersey Volunteers. Leonard married Nancy Allison. He served as a major in the King's County militia. He died in Horton at the age of 69.
