= William Baxter (Nova Scotia politician) =

Canadian politician

William Baxter (c. 1760 – November 22, 1832) was a physician, businessman and political figure in Nova Scotia. He represented Cornwallis Township from 1793 to 1799 in the Nova Scotia House of Assembly.

He was born in New Hampshire, the son of Captain Simon Baxter and Prudence Fox. In 1783, he married Ruth Sheffield. Baxter later married Julia Swigo. He was one of the first physicians in Kings County, Nova Scotia. He died in Cornwallis, Nova Scotia.
