= Battle of Fort Cumberland (1776) =

American Revolution battle in Nova Scotia

- Part of the American Revolution
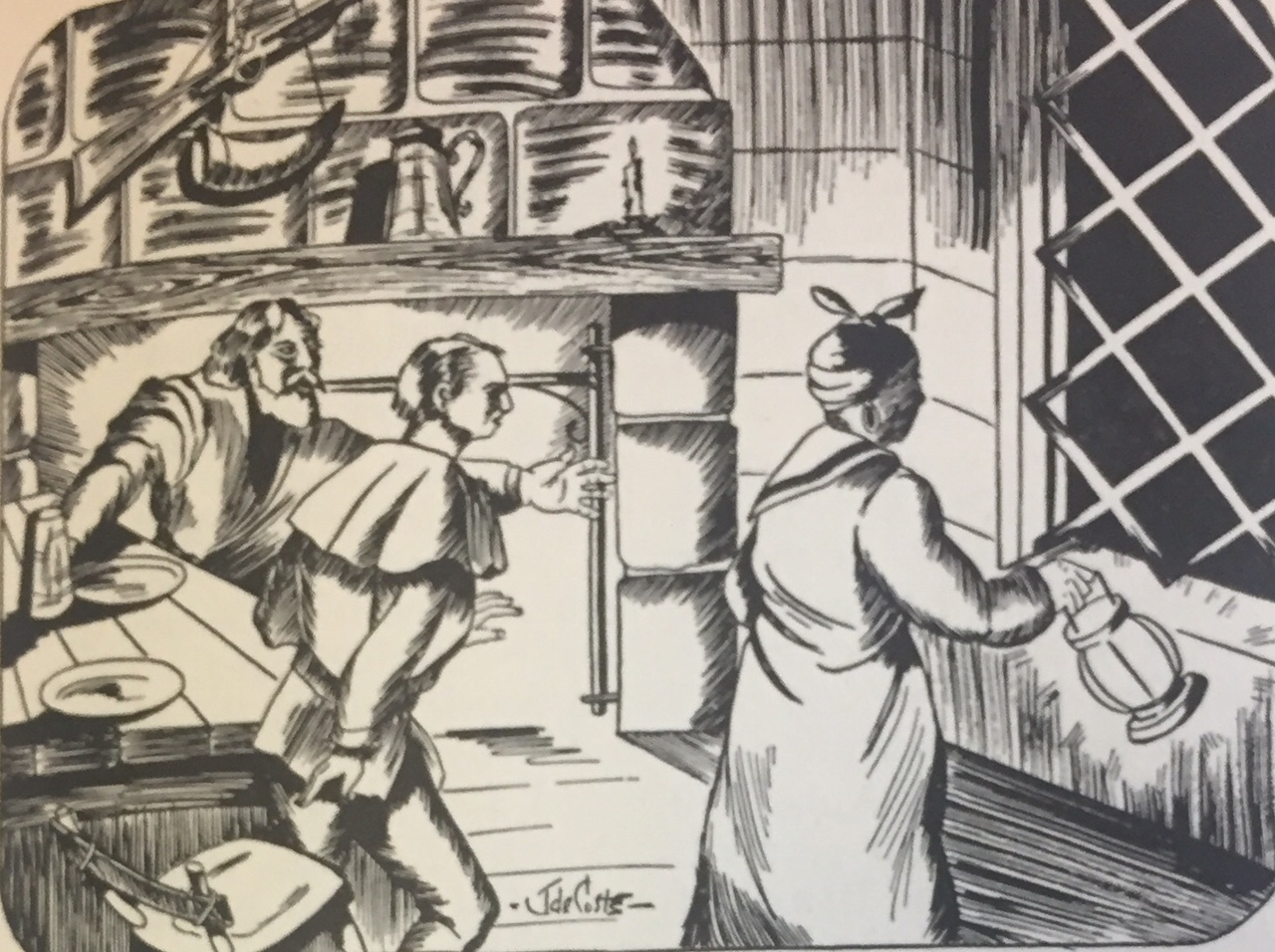
- Commander Joseph Goreham, Battle of Fort Cumberland, 1776
Date	November 10–29, 1776 (2 weeks and 5 days)
Location	Near Sackville, then Nova Scotia, now Westmorland County, New Brunswick 45°51′54″N 64°17′28″W
Result	British victory

Belligerents
United States	Great Britain

Commanders and leaders
Jonathan Eddy; Benoni Danks	Joseph Goreham; John Eagleson; Thomas Dixson

Strength
400+ militia	200 militia (Fencibles)

Casualties and losses
"some" killed 5 captured (1 died of wounds)	13 killed Unknown wounded 56 captured

The Battle of Fort Cumberland (also known as the Eddy Rebellion) was an attempt by a small number of militia commanded by Jonathan Eddy to bring the American Revolutionary War to Nova Scotia in late 1776. With minimal logistical support from Massachusetts and four to five hundred volunteer militia and Natives, Eddy attempted to besiege and storm Fort Cumberland in central Nova Scotia (near the present-day border between Nova Scotia and New Brunswick) in November 1776.

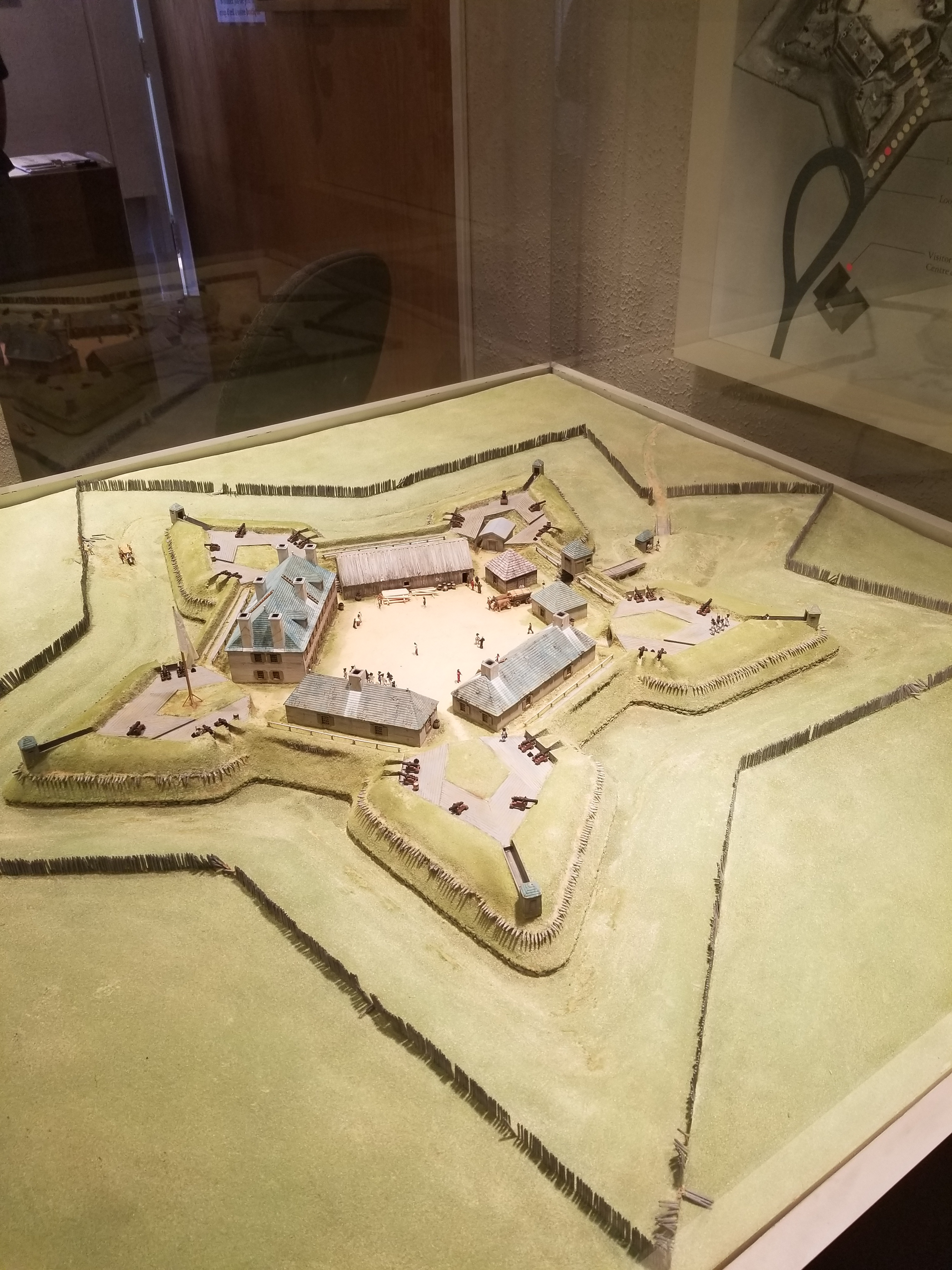
Fort Cumberland

The fort's defenders, the Royal Fencible American Regiment led by Joseph Goreham, a veteran of the French and Indian War, successfully repelled several attempts by Eddy's militia to storm the fort, and the siege was ultimately relieved when the RFA plus marine reinforcements drove off the besiegers on November 29. In retaliation for the role of locals who supported the siege, numerous homes and farms were destroyed, and Patriot sympathizers were driven out of the area. The successful defense of Fort Cumberland preserved the territorial integrity of the British Maritime possessions, and Nova Scotia remained loyal throughout the war.

== Background ==
Nova Scotia was generally poorly defended in the early stages of the American Revolutionary War, and unrest in the eastern regions provoked fears of an American-led uprising. Although some reinforcements had reached Halifax by early 1776, the frontiers of the province were only lightly defended.

Fort Cumberland was located on the Isthmus of Chignecto, which connects modern mainland Nova Scotia with New Brunswick. The area was strategically important in earlier conflicts between the French colony of Acadia and British-controlled Nova Scotia. Originally built by the French in 1750 as Fort Beauséjour, Fort Cumberland was in deplorable condition. Won from the French in the Battle of Fort Beauséjour in 1755, the fortifications had been minimally garrisoned by the British after the Seven Years' War and abandoned in 1768. As early as June 1775, Colonel Joseph Goreham had been ordered by General Thomas Gage to raise the Royal Fencible American Regiment of Foot and natives in Nova Scotia for the defense of the province against Patriot activity. Arriving at the fort in the summer of 1776, Colonel Goreham and a garrison of 200 Loyalist troops of the RFA did what they could to restore the premises to a defensible condition. But Goreham had not been adequately provisioned and his men lacked everything from victuals to uniforms. Furthermore, the locals were generally sympathetic to the Patriot cause, and refused to assist in rehabilitating the fort, even trying to induce members of the garrison to defect.

== Discontent in Nova Scotia ==
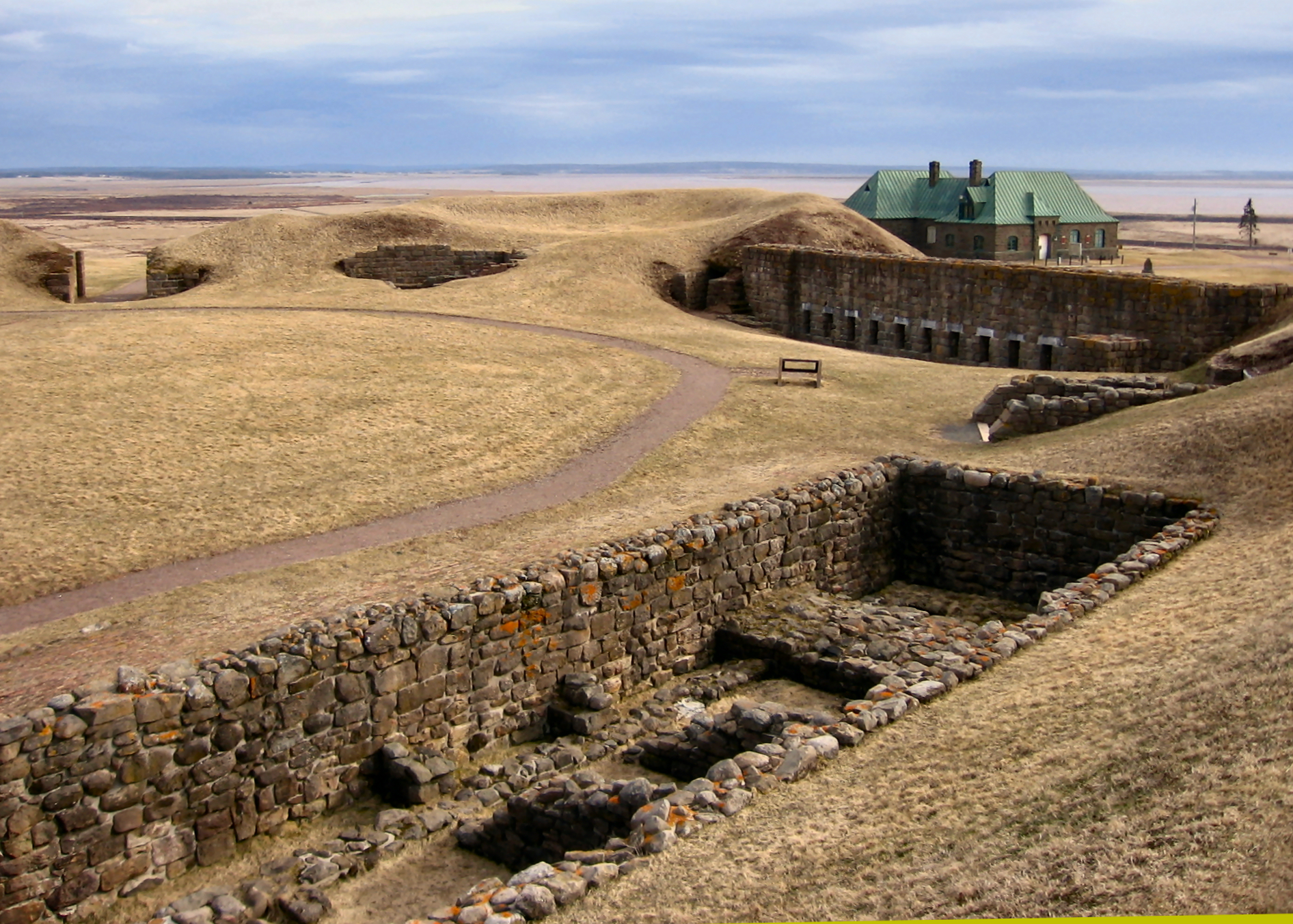
Fort Cumberland

Jonathan Eddy was a Massachusetts-born resident of Cumberland County, Nova Scotia, where the fort was located. He and John Allan, both of whom served in the provincial assembly, were the prime movers of Patriot activity in the area, which was one of several hotbeds of agitation in Nova Scotia. The other major areas of Patriot activity were Maugerville in the St. John River valley of Sunbury County (present-day New Brunswick), and Cobequid, and there were also pockets of activity in Pictou and the Passamaquoddy Bay area, which separates present-day Maine and New Brunswick. Patriots in these communities were in contact with each other, and those of Cumberland and Maugerville were active in trying to interest nearby natives (Passamaquoddy, Maliseet, and Mi'kmaq) in their cause.

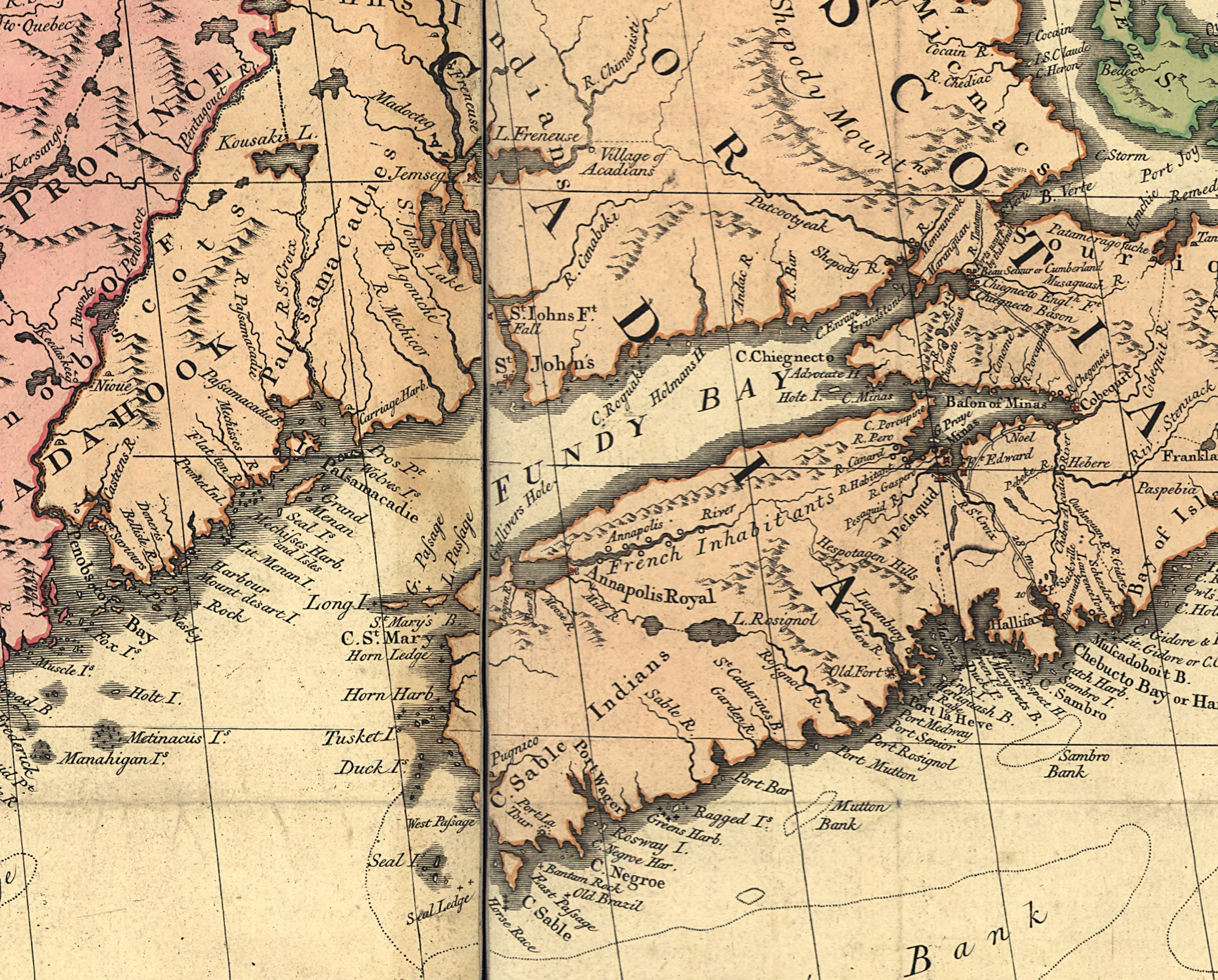
A section of the Mitchell Map showing some of the places in this action. Fort Lawrence is labeled "Chignecto Engl Ft", and Windsor is labeled "Fort Edward".

Eddy believed that with military assistance from the Thirteen Colonies, he might be able to bring down the strongly Loyalist administration of Nova Scotia. Early in 1776, Eddy went to Massachusetts in an attempt to interest political and military leaders there in supporting action in Nova Scotia, while Allan worked to raise interest in Nova Scotia. Allan's work was made more difficult by the arrival of Colonel Goreham and his troops to refortify Fort Cumberland, and by the activities of Michael Francklin, a former Lieutenant Governor of Nova Scotia and a vocal Loyalist. Eddy returned empty-handed to Nova Scotia in June 1776, only to learn that Goreham had put a price on his head. The activities of Goreham's Fencibles in the Cumberland area were successful enough that Patriot activities there were effectively forced underground; the center of these activities was shifted to Maugerville in part as a consequence of this. Goreham, a veteran of the French and Indian War, was also able to blunt Patriot inroads in the native communities, where the Mi'kmaq refused to take sides, and the Maliseet and Passamaquoddy, at first supportive of the Patriots, ultimately did not turn out in the numbers Eddy had hoped for or been promised.

Eddy returned to Massachusetts in August. While the Second Continental Congress and George Washington would not authorize, fund, or otherwise support military activities in Nova Scotia, Eddy was able to convince the Massachusetts Provincial Congress to provide some material support (primarily muskets, ammunition, powder, and other military supplies) for an attempt on Fort Cumberland. It also allowed Eddy to engage in recruiting in the District of Maine.

== Raising the militia ==
Eddy left Boston in September and sailed to Machias, where he recruited about 20 men. On October 13, this party sailed from Machias for Passamaquoddy Bay. Coincidentally, John Allan, who was working on a longer-term plan for military action, sailed from Campobello Island for Machias the same day. The two parties met at sea, where Allan attempted to dissuade Eddy from his plan, informing him that the Mi'kmaq (the largest tribe in Nova Scotia) would not help him. Allan extracted a promise from Eddy to wait at Campobello while he went to Machias to meet with the council there. When the Machias council learned of how little native support there was, they sent a letter to Eddy urging him to give up the effort. Eddy persisted, and left Campobello, having added nine Passamaquoddy recruits to his band.

From Campobello, Eddy sailed up the Saint John River to Maugerville, where 27 men were recruited, and then up to the Maliseet settlement at Aukpaque (just upriver from present-day Fredericton). There he learned the bad news that Pierre Tomah, the main Maliseet chief, was not interested in taking up the hatchet. Eddy was able to convince Ambroise St. Aubin, one of Tomah's competitors, and 15 men to join the expedition in exchange for an agreement with the Maugerville community to support the families of those men. In another disappointment, none of the local Acadians joined, contrary to assertions St. Aubin had made to Eddy during a previous visit to the area.

== Prelude ==
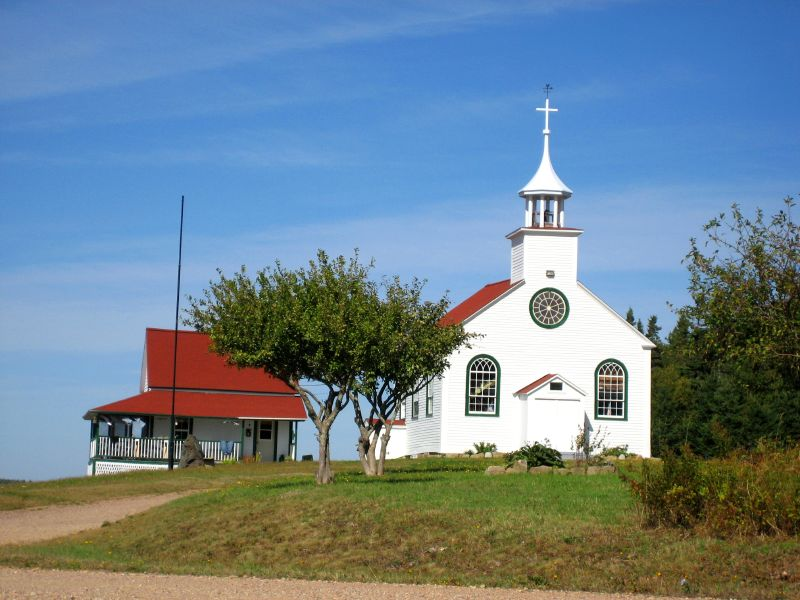
Beaumont historic site, Fort Folly Point, New Brunswick may have been the site of Shepody Outpost.

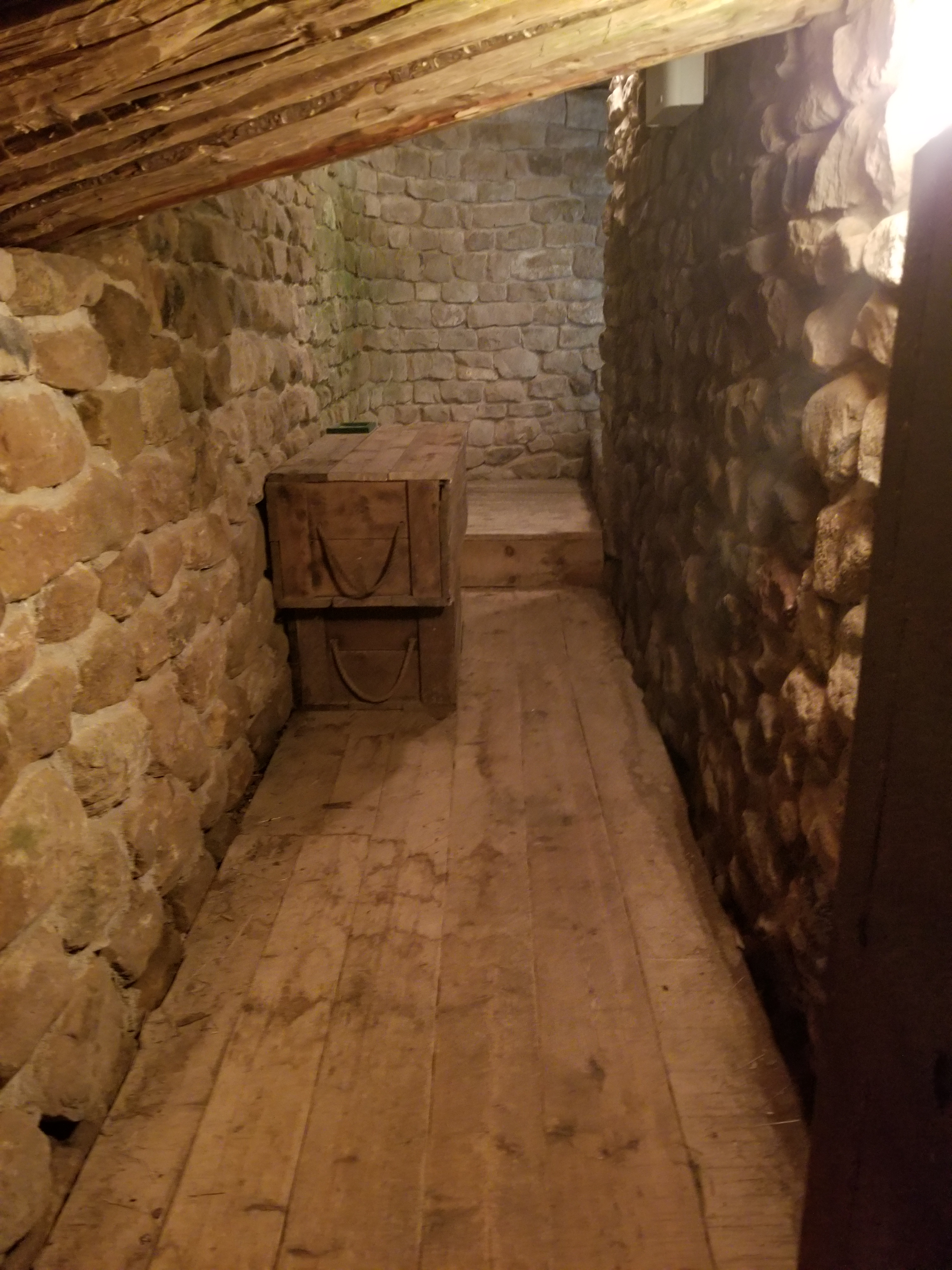
Fort Cumberland

With a force now numbering about 72, Eddy sailed up the Bay of Fundy to Shepody Outpost. The exact location of this outpost, established probably by Joseph Goreham in September, is subject to debate. It may have been present-day Hopewell Cape, New Brunswick on the Bay's western side, or it may have been Fort Folly Point on its eastern side. In any case, it was there that Eddy captured a patrol of Goreham's Fencibles on October 25, killing one and wounding another. The prisoners were shipped back to Machias, and Eddy sent some of his men to Cocagne in a largely fruitless effort to enlist Miꞌkmaqs in the cause. Eddy himself continued on to Memramcook, where about two dozen of the Acadian locals joined him. This enlarged force marched to Sackville, where more settlers joined the force, swelling it (by Eddy's account) to about 180 men. Goreham was finally alerted to Eddy's actions on November 4, when a boat sent with supplies for the Shepody patrol was informed of Eddy's activities by locals. Goreham heightened the guard on the fort, but did not immediately attempt to notify Halifax or Windsor, since he was uncertain what routes away from the fort might have been blocked by Eddy.

On October 31, the frigate Juno escorted the supply sloop Polly to Fort Cumberland, where she docked below the fort on the Aulac River. Polly was laden with supplies to last the fort through the winter, and work began immediately to unload those supplies. Juno, easily visible from Sackville, was a concern to Eddy, since her presence added to the fort's defenses. Fortunately for Eddy, she sailed on November 3, leaving Polly docked below the fort. On November 6, Eddy's patrols began ranging closer to the fort, alerting Goreham to the approaching force. Goreham took no additional steps to protect Polly, and any attempts to get word of his predicament out were again delayed by his decision to await the return of scouts he had dispatched earlier. (The fate of the scouts is uncertain; they did not return before the fort was invested.) That evening, thirty of Eddy's men surprised the sleepy guards aboard Polly, taking thirteen prisoners. They also seized another ship, owned by a Patriot sympathizer, that happened to be anchored nearby.

On the morning of November 7 Goreham decided that it was time to get a message to Windsor. He sent a party of men down to the dock that morning. These men, numbering about 30, were taken prisoner by Eddy's men as rapidly as they arrived due to their unawareness that Eddy had control of the ship. Polly was then sailed to Fort Lawrence, to the east of Fort Cumberland, where the supplies were landed. Sentries in the fort spotted the move, and Goreham, realizing Eddy had taken the ship, fired an ineffectual cannonade against the ship.

== Siege ==
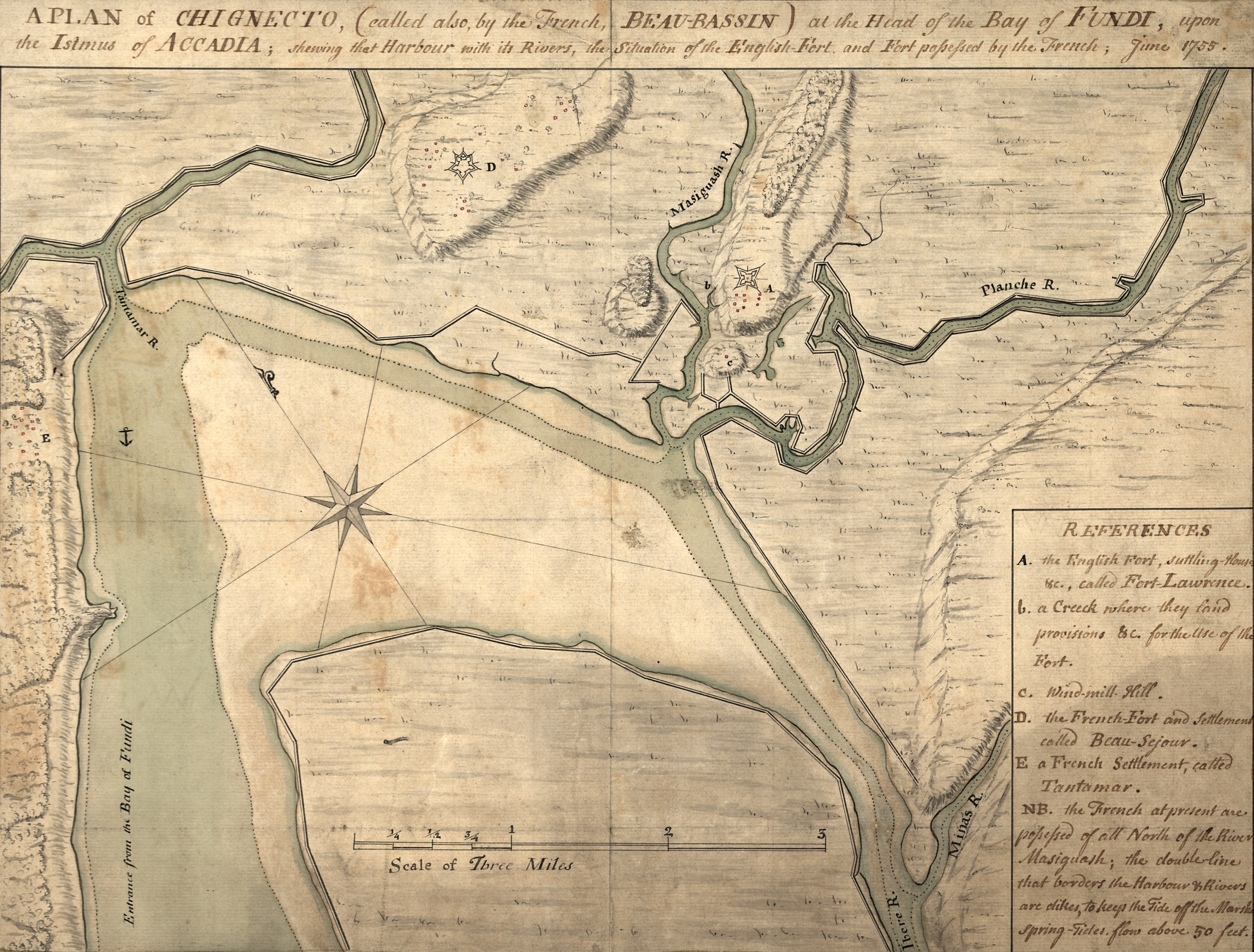
A 1755 map of the area. Fort Cumberland is "D" in the upper center, and the Aulac River is the unlabeled right branch of the Tantramar River in the upper left.

Goreham took stock of his situation. Nearly one quarter of his garrison (more than 60 men) had been captured by Eddy, along with critical fuel and other supplies that had not been unloaded from the Polly before her seizure. His defenses consisted of a hastily constructed palisade that encompassed most of the fort, and six cannon, for which his men had only completed three mounts. The fort's military complement was 176 men, including officers and artillerymen. Over the next few days, local militia arrived to raise the garrison's size to about 200, although this included individuals not effective for combat due to illness. On both November 7 and 8 he again attempted to get messengers out of Eddy's cordon, without success.

On November 8 Eddy was joined by about 200 men from Cobequid and Pictou, and he finally felt ready to act on November 10. Eddy sent a letter demanding that Goreham surrender his garrison. Goreham refused, suggesting in retort that Eddy surrender.

The next day authorities outside the area learned of Eddy's activities. Michael Francklin, patrolling in the Bay of Fundy for privateers, recovered a ferry that had been taken, and learned from its passengers that Eddy was active. When the news reached Halifax through the efforts of Thomas Dixson, Lieutenant Governor Marriot Arbuthnot responded by dispatching orders on the 15th for any available ship based at Annapolis to go to Fort Edward in Windsor, to convoy troops to relieve the siege.

Commodore Sir George Collier had previously dispatched HMS Vulture into the Bay of Fundy on rumors of privateering activity there, so he ordered HMS Hope to locate Vulture so that she could assist. However, Hope captured a prize and returned to Halifax; she was then sent out again to accompany a supply ship to Fort Cumberland. In the meantime, Vulture fortuitously arrived at Windsor, where she took on some marines and Fencibles.

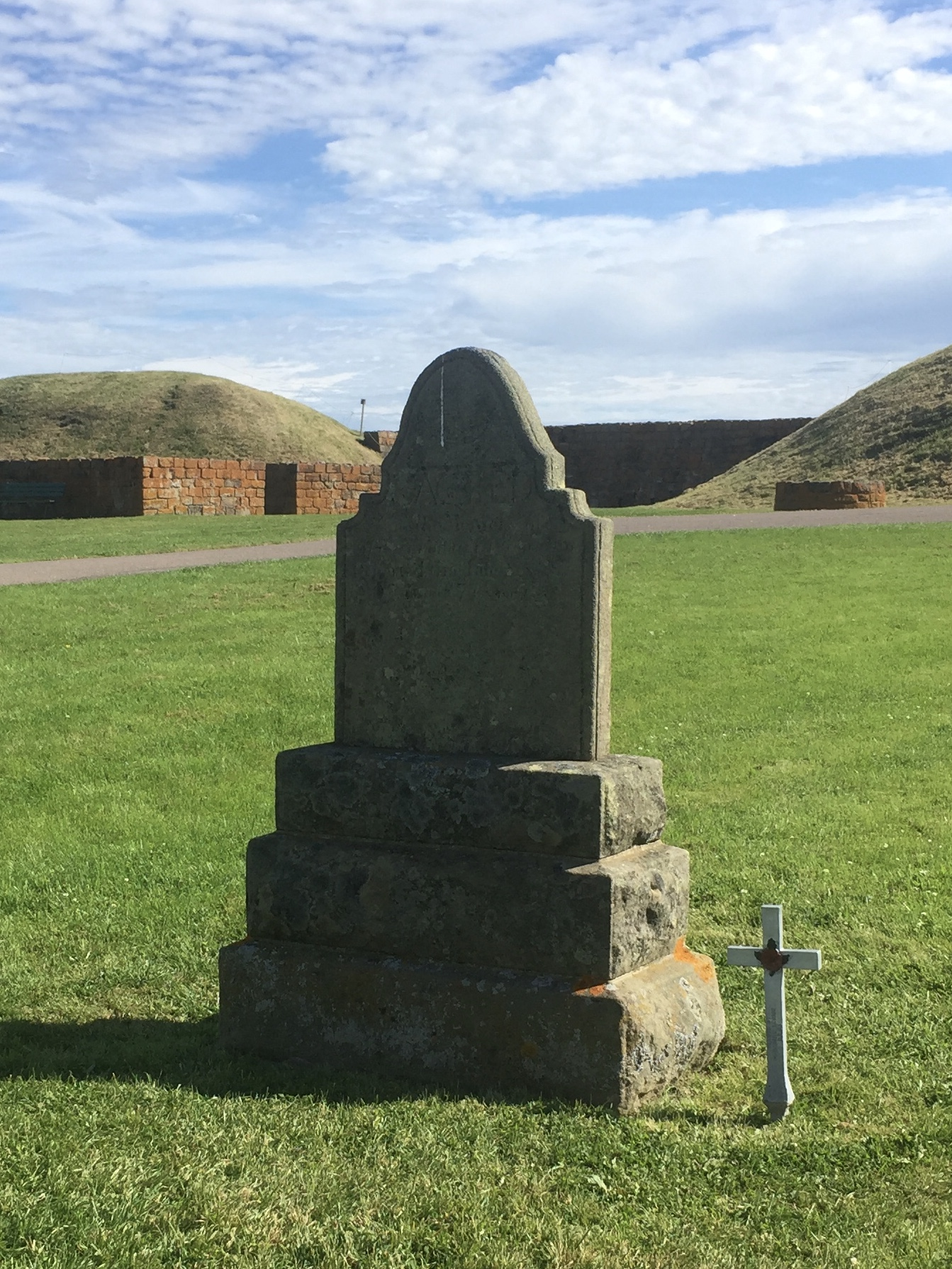
Thomas Dixson Grave, Fort Cumberland, New Brunswick

Lacking artillery, the rebels attempted to storm the fort on the night of November 12, attempting a feint to draw Goreham's strength away from the weak points of the defenses. The experienced Goreham saw through the feint and repulsed the attack. One of Eddy's Maliseet warriors sneaked into the fort and very nearly opened a gate but was stopped at the last moment. Following the failed attack, Eddy effectively lost control of the expedition, as a council of leaders formed against him. Night attacks ordered by the council on November 22 and 23 succeeded in capturing and burning several buildings, but Goreham grimly held his ground, and the invaders were again repulsed.

On November 27, Vulture arrived. Rather than retreat in the face of arriving relief, the rebels increased their guard; Goreham, with some intelligence about the size of the force opposing him, planned a sortie. Early on the morning of November 29, Major Thomas Batt led 150 men from Vulture's marine contingent and the Royal Fencible Americans, and scattered Eddy's men, killing and wounding several, at the cost of two dead and three wounded.

== Aftermath ==
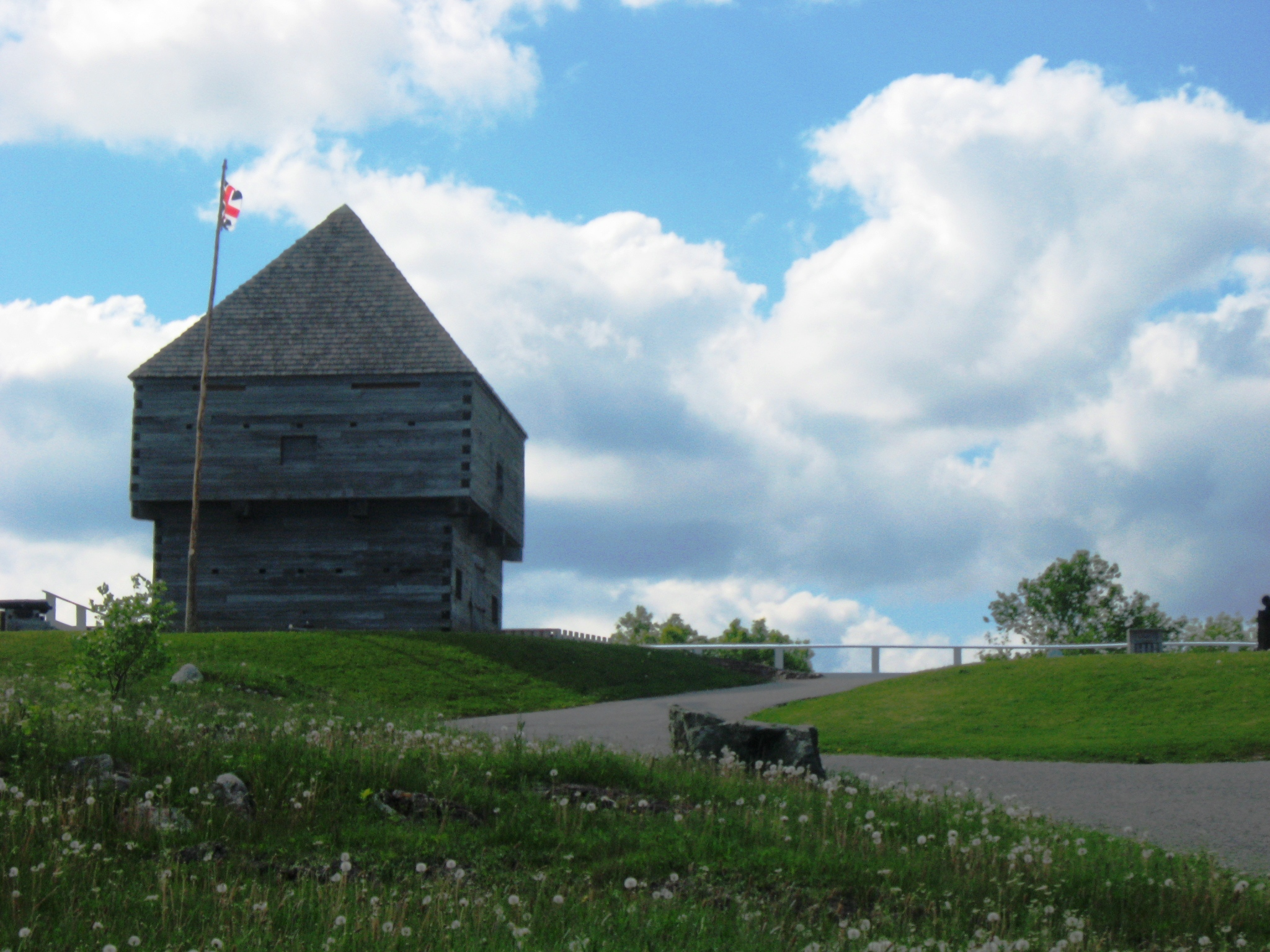
Replica of a blockhouse at the site of Fort Howe, at the mouth of the Saint John River. This area was fortified by the British in 1777 to deter privateering and other rebel activities.

Batt's men chased Eddy's, but bad weather and the lack of adequate footwear eventually caused him to call off the pursuit. Eddy's forces scattered, with many retreating overland to Maugerville. Some of the Massachusetts men took more than two months to reach Machias. Homes and farms of rebel supporters were burned in reprisal but British authorities took a lenient approach toward captured rebels, including Richard John Uniacke, who went on to become Attorney General of Nova Scotia. Goreham issued an offer of pardon for those who would surrender their arms, which more than 100 locals accepted. This prompted Major Batt to file charges against Goreham for neglect of duty; Goreham was exonerated.

The victory at Fort Cumberland strengthened the British presence in Nova Scotia, in part by driving Patriot sympathizers like Allan and Eddy out of the province, but also by cowing those that remained, often by requiring people to make pledges to the Crown. Some unrest continued for the remainder of the war (e.g., the Battle at Miramichi), although no further large scale military threat occurred. The most significant attempt occurred in the summer of 1777, when John Allan was authorized by Congress to take actions in Nova Scotia; however, only a small number of forces were raised for this effort at Saint John, and a British show of force put an end to the attempt. Eddy appears to have been involved with Allan's work, but his movements prior to August 1777 are uncertain. Commodore Collier followed up by attacking Machias, intending to break Allan's plans. Eddy led the defense of Machias during the battle on August 13–15, 1777. (Collier's action was in fact unnecessary; the Massachusetts Provincial Congress had in early August voted to disband forces recruited for Allan's expedition, because of the imminent threat posed by the army of General John Burgoyne in upstate New York.)

The Battle of Fort Cumberland was poorly documented in 19th-century histories of Nova Scotia and New Brunswick, often receiving only minimal mention. The involvement of local inhabitants (natives, Acadians, and English-speakers) in the siege was generally understated or unknown. The site of Fort Cumberland has been preserved as a National Historic Site of Canada, and is administered by Parks Canada.

== See also ==
- American Revolution – Nova Scotia theatre
- List of American Revolutionary War battles

== Bibliography ==
- The Acts and Resolves, Public and Private, of the Province of the Massachusetts Bay, Volume 20. Commonwealth of Massachusetts. 1920. OCLC 4553382.
- Bumsted, J. M (1987). Land, Settlement, and Politics on Eighteenth-Century Prince Edward Island. Toronto: McGill-Queen's University Press. p. 68. ISBN 978-0-7735-0566-7.
- Charters, David A.; Sutherland, Stuart R. J. (1979). "Goreham, Joseph". In Halpenny, Francess G. (ed.). Dictionary of Canadian Biography. Vol. IV (1771–1800) (online ed.). University of Toronto Press.
- Clarke, Ernest (1995). The Siege of Fort Cumberland, 1776. McGill Queens University Press. ISBN 978-0-7735-1867-4.
- Gwyn, Julian (2004). Frigates and Foremasts: The North American Squadron in Nova Scotia Waters, 1745-1815. Vancouver, BC: UBC Press. ISBN 978-0-7748-0911-5. OCLC 144078613.
- Kidder, Frederic, ed. (1867). Military Operations in Eastern Maine and Nova Scotia During the Revolution. J. Munsell. This book contains Eddy's report detailing the action through early January 1777.
- Leamon, James S. (1995). Revolution Downeast: The War for American Independence in Maine. University of Massachusetts Press. ISBN 978-0-87023-959-5.
- Porter, Joseph Whitcomb (1877). Memoir of Col. Jonathan Eddy of Eddington, Me. Sprague, Owen & Nash. This book also contains Eddy's report of January 1777 as well as additional documents and reports.
- Public Archives of Canada, Douglas Brymner; Arthur George Doughty; Edouard Richard (1895). 1894 Annual Report – Public Archives of Canada. Public Archives. This book contains Colonel Goreham's reports on the action, as well as orders issued by others with respect to this event.
- "Fort Beauséjour/Fort Cumberland National Historic Site". Parks Canada.
