= Londonderry, Nova Scotia =

Community in Canada

Coordinates: 45°28′30.7″N 63°36′08.7″W

Location of Londonderry in Nova Scotia

Londonderry (formerly Acadia Mines) is an unincorporated community in the Canadian province of Nova Scotia, located in Colchester County.

A bustling iron ore mining and steel making town of some 5,000 in the late 19th century, the population today stands at around 200.

The CN main line runs through Londonderry Station, about two kilometers east of the village of Londonderry.

== History ==
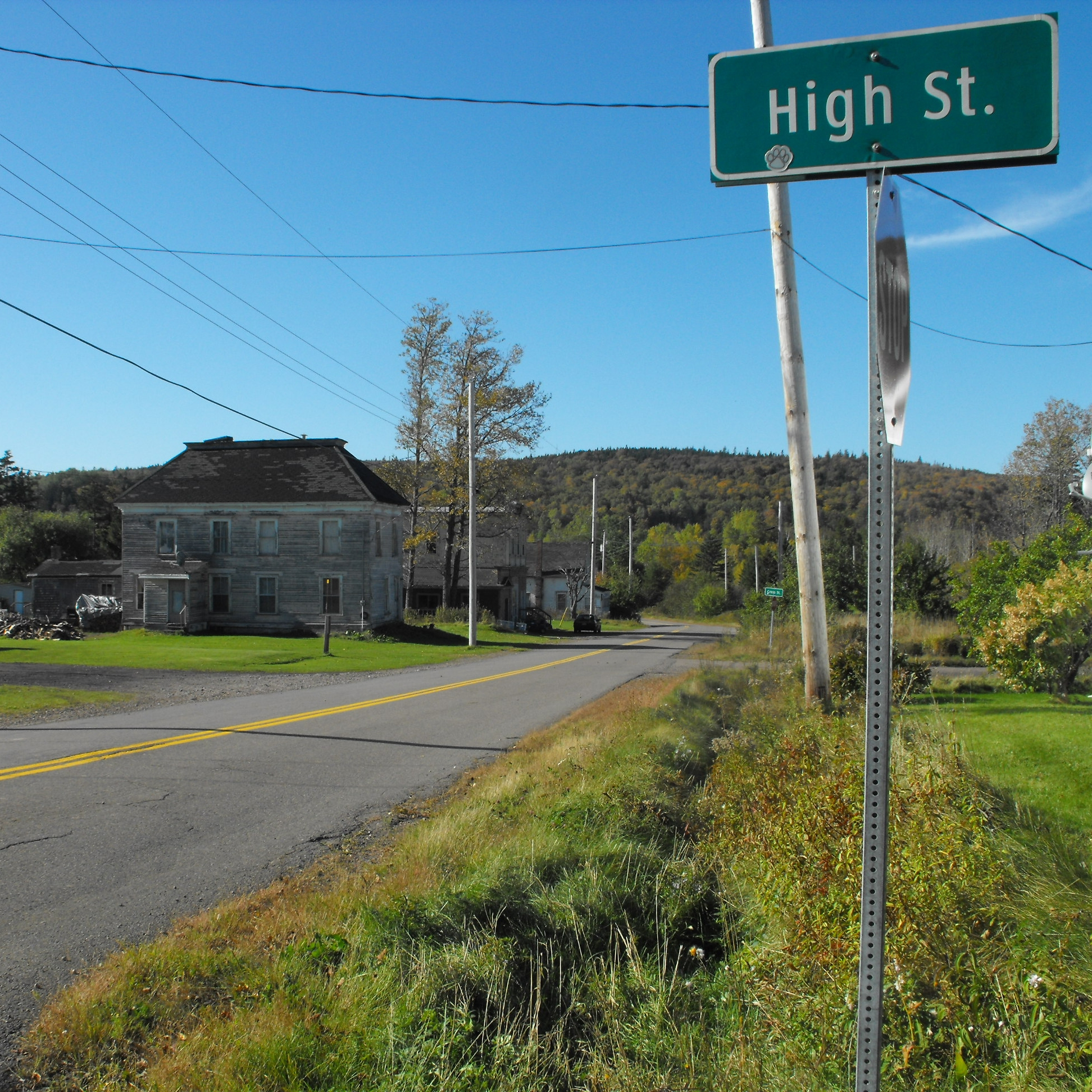
Londonderry, Nova Scotia

Londonderry saw the pouring of some of the first steel made in Canada, and the first Canadian installation of the Bessemer process for making steel. Mining began in 1849 and eventually three mines - East Mines, Old Mountain Mine, and West Mines - were operated. Over 2 million tons of ore were produced.

The iron ore seams that encouraged development, originally thought to be enormous, proved to be small, shallow, and very expensive to mine. That, coupled with poor management decisions and failed experiments with rotary type ovens as well as low world steel prices, spelled the demise of the iron and steel industry in Londonderry. The fatal blow to the community came with a destructive fire in 1920 which destroyed a large portion of the town. The mine operations were foreclosed in 1924 and the town never recovered thereafter. The once vast ruins of the former steel mill were torn down and sold as scrap during the scrap metal drives of World War II.

== Settlement ==
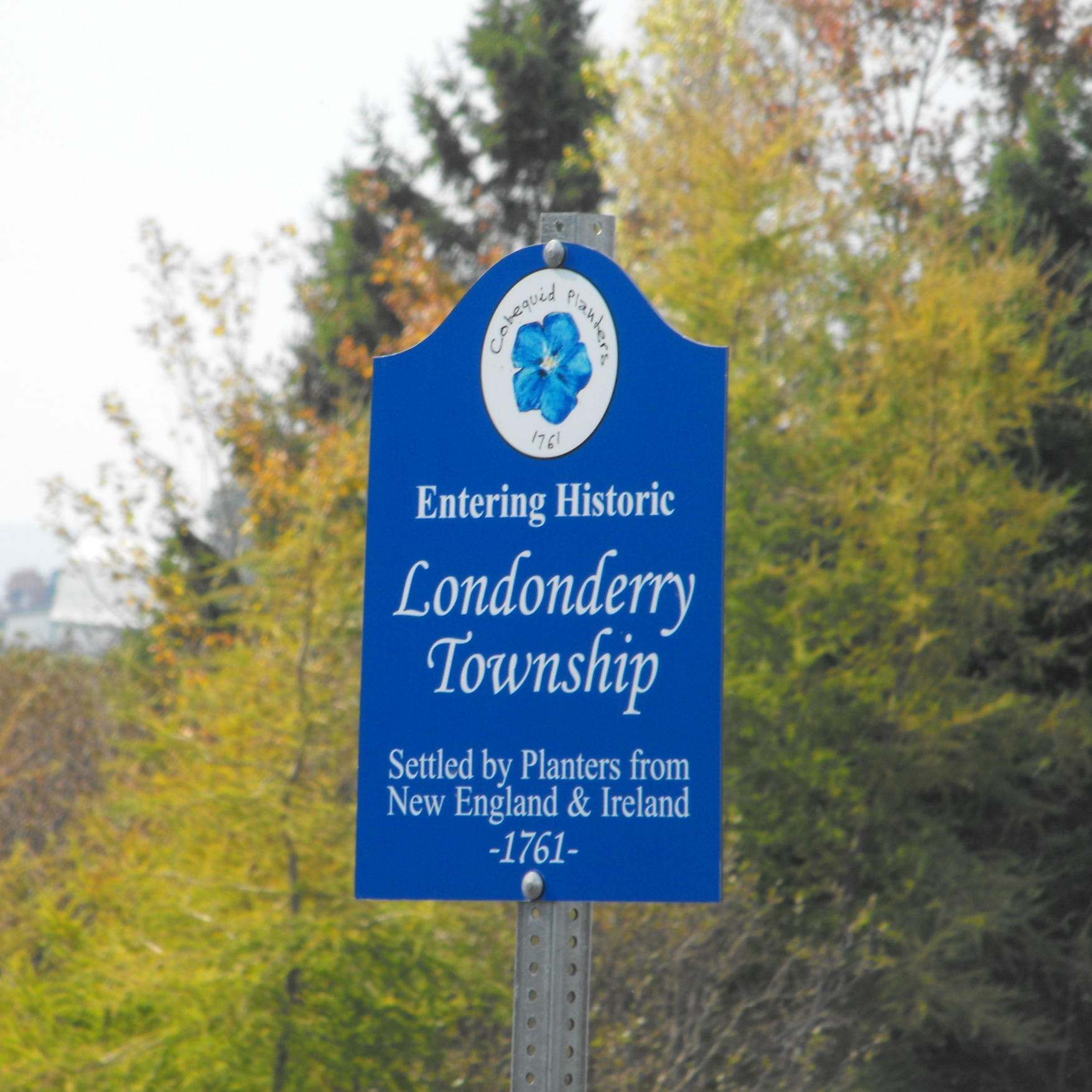
Township of Londonderry marker.

The Township of Londonderry, including the Port of Londonderry (now Great Village), was first settled by two groups of Scots Irish emigrants. The first group came from the town of Londonderry, New Hampshire in 1761 whilst a larger contingent who had arrived in Halifax in October 1761 on the ship Hopewell out of Derry in Ireland, settled a few years later once land grants were secured. Both arrangements made by former British army Captain Alexander McNutt, who was formerly stationed at nearby Fort Cumberland and was originally from Ireland.

=== Early settlers ===
Those who settled Londonderry Township included the following individuals:

- Barnhill, John; of Donegal; resident of Derry/Onslow
- Clark, John; of Tamlaught Finleggan, Derry
- Cochran, Daniel; of Derrykeychen, Antrim
- Crawford, Joseph; of Rathmelton, Donegal
- Henderson, William; of Rathmullan, Donegal
- Mahon, John; of Rosses, Donegal; resident of Derry
- McClean, Anthony; of near Letterkenny, Donegal; resident of Derry
- McNutt, Benjamin Bar; of Killmacrene, Mauagh, Donegal
- McNutt, John; of Tullyachnish, Derry
- McNutt, William; of Mavagh, Donegal; resident of Onslow
- Moore, William; of Fahan, Donegal
- Morrison, John;of Ry Tollaghebegly Donegal; resident of Derry
- Patton, Mark; of Fosghan Vael, Derry; resident of Cumberland
- Ross, Andrew; of Belreshain, Antrim
- Smith, Robert; of Cahery, Drummacose, Derry
- Spencer, Robert; of Clanda Horky, Donegal; resident of derry

== Notable residents ==
- Laurie Davidson Cox (1883–1968), leading American landscape architect.
- Frank Parker Day, writer, taught school there
- Robert McElhinney (ca 1747–1831), Irish-born political figure who represented Londonderry Township in the Nova Scotia House of Assembly
- Archibald McLelan (1824–1890), Lieutenant Governor of Nova Scotia
- James Meissner (1896–1936), World War I flying, recipient of two Distinguished Service Crosses.
- Thomas Fletcher Morrison (1808–1886), sailor, farmer and political figure in Nova Scotia
- Doris Petrie (1918–2000), Canadian film and television actress

== See also ==
- Charles Dickson Archibald
