= Alexander Howe =

Canadian politician

Alexander Howe (December 19, 1749 – January 9, 1813) was a soldier, judge and political figure in Nova Scotia and Prince Edward Island. He represented Annapolis County in the Nova Scotia House of Assembly from 1785 to 1793, and then Granville Township from 1793 to 1799.

He was born in Annapolis Royal, Nova Scotia, the son of Edward How and Marie-Madeleine Winniett. Howe served as a lieutenant with the British army in Jamaica, England and Ireland. He married Helen McKellar Bontein in 1778. In 1783, he returned to Granville, Nova Scotia and began farming. On June 15, 1786, he was declared elected to the 6th General Assembly of Nova Scotia for Annapolis County, after two disputed elections were overturned. Howe also served as justice of the peace and judge in the Inferior Court of Common Pleas for Annapolis County. He was named captain in the Royal Nova Scotia Regiment and also was superintendent of Jamaican maroons. After he was replaced in that post, he moved to Prince Edward Island in 1802 where he served as assistant commissary and storekeeper. Howe also served on the colony's Council and was a justice of the peace there. In 1803, he married Margaret Ann Green, the granddaughter of Benjamin Green. After two of his sons died accidentally and he suffered financial losses, Howe returned to Nova Scotia where he died in Dartmouth at the age of 63.
