= Robert McElhinney =

Nova Scotian politician (c.1747–1831)

Robert McElhinney (c. 1747 – April 22, 1831) was an Irish-born political figure in Nova Scotia, Canada. He represented Londonderry Township in the Nova Scotia House of Assembly from 1790 to 1799.

He came to Nova Scotia in the 1760s. In 1821, he married the widow Margaret Davis. He died at Londonderry, Nova Scotia at the age of 84.
