= John McMonagle =

Canadian politician

John McMonagle was a judge and political figure in Nova Scotia. He represented Windsor Township from 1784 to 1799 and Hants County from 1799 to 1806.

In 1773, McMonagle married Frederica Dorothy Wranfield. He was named justice of the peace for Hants County in 1792. In 1801, he was named a justice in the Inferior Court of Common Pleas and he became custos rotulorum in 1810.
