= John William Schwartz =

Nova Scotian politician

John William Schwartz (1755 – after 1802) was a merchant and political figure in Nova Scotia. He represented Lunenburg County in the Legislative Assembly from 1785 to 1799.

He was baptized in November 1755, the son of Otto William Schwartz and Annie Justine Liebrich. In 1787, Schwartz married Anne Pedley. He was named a magistrate for Halifax County in 1802.
