= Richard John Uniacke =

Canadian politician (1753–1830)

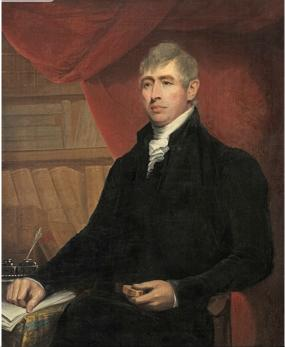
- Richard John Uniacke by Robert Field
- Born: November 22, 1753; Castletown, Kingdom of Ireland
- Died: October 11, 1830 (aged 76); Mount Uniacke, Nova Scotia

Richard John Uniacke (November 22, 1753 – October 11, 1830) was an abolitionist, lawyer, politician, member of the Nova Scotia House of Assembly and Attorney General of Nova Scotia. According to historian Brian Cutherburton, Uniacke was "the most influential Nova Scotian of his day.... His faith in Nova Scotia's destiny as a partner in a great empire was only to be equalled by Joseph Howe." He devoted 49 years to public service in Nova Scotia. He fought in the American Revolution and later sought to emancipate Catholics and Black Nova Scotians who were slaves in Nova Scotia. He is buried in the crypt of St. Paul's Church. His substantial estate (c. 1813) is preserved as the Uniacke Estate Museum Park at Mount Uniacke.

== Ireland ==
Born in Castletown, Ballintotis, Castlemartyr, County Cork, Ireland, located just four kilometres from the family estate of Mountuniacke, created by his grandfather, Captain James Uniacke. Richard attended school at Lismore, County Waterford. At the age of sixteen he came under the influence of a Catholic priest and as this was abhorrent to his Protestant family, his father had him sent to Dublin where he was articled with the law firm of Thomas Garde. In Dublin Richard became fascinated with the movement for greater Irish political autonomy and he eventually joined with the Irish nationalists. This caused a rupture in the relationship with his father and being cut off from his allowance. Refusing to return home, Richard being penniless, prematurely abandoned his studies in 1773 and decided to seek his fortune in North America.

== The West Indies and New England ==
Uniacke first sought work in the West Indies, traveling to St. Kitts in December 1773 where an elder brother was serving in the Army. However, Uniacke quickly came to detest the cruelty and hypocrisy of plantation slavery. He moved on to Philadelphia in 1774 to seek a position. Soon after his arrival in Philadelphia, Uniacke met Moses Delesdernier, a merchant organizing settlers for land in the Chignecto area of Nova Scotia at the head of the Upper Bay of Fundy. Uniacke agreed to join as a partner and agent for the settlement.

== Nova Scotia ==
Uniacke arrived with Delesdernier at Hopewell Cape, near present-day Moncton in 1775. Uniacke found the settlement conditions difficult but enjoyed the adventure of frontier travel across the Isthmus of Chignecto, visiting the scattered settlements of the region.

=== American Independence ===
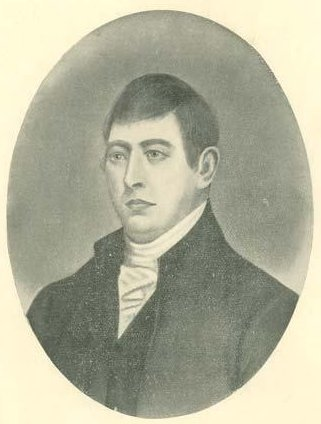
Uniacke at the beginning of his career in Nova Scotia

In 1776, Uniacke joined the American rebels in the Battle of Fort Cumberland, despite the loyalty of his father-in-law Delesdernier. Under the leadership of Jonathan Eddy, American Rebels laid siege to Fort Cumberland and pillaged the local population who remained loyal to the British. Uniacke participated in some of these actions and while trying to commandeer supplies heading for the Fort he was captured.

Shortly thereafter he was sent as a prisoner to Halifax. As a rebel, Uniacke faced being charged with treason. If found guilty, he would have been hanged. It is likely due to his family connections, the fact several military officers in Halifax had been stationed with several of his brothers, and the fact he provided evidence for the crown that led to his release. Uniacke, since the time of the Eddy Rebellion, had developed an animosity for Americans, once stating they were " a race of the most lawless profligate and wicked monsters that exist on the face of the earth".

=== General Assembly of Nova Scotia ===
Seven years later, after the American Revolution, Uniacke became a member of the House of Assembly for over twenty years, representing Sackville Township 1783–1785, Halifax County 1785–1793 and Queens County 1798–1805. In 1808 he was appointed to the Nova Scotia Council.

=== Catholic emancipation ===
Uniacke took up the cause of religious reform in Protestant-dominated Nova Scotia. In 1783 he redrafted a bill passed by the Nova Scotia House of Assembly to repeal the law passed in 1758 that had proscribed Catholics. The bill had been struck down by the British government. Uniacke's redraft was confirmed thus allowing Catholics to own land, build churches and hire priests. In 1786 Uniacke was one of the founding members of the Charitable Irish Society of Halifax; established to assist needy Irish regardless of whether they were Protestant or Catholic. In subsequent years Uniacke put forward additional amendments to laws which allowed Catholics to establish schools and to vote in elections. His efforts to bring about complete emancipation of Catholics continued until success was achieved through the Roman Catholic Relief Act 1829.

=== Abolition of slavery ===
While many blacks who arrived in Nova Scotia during the American Revolution were free, others were not. Black slaves also arrived in Nova Scotia as the property of White American Loyalists. In 1772, prior to the American Revolution, Britain outlawed the slave trade in the British Isles followed by the Knight v. Wedderburn decision in Scotland in 1778. This decision, in turn, influenced the colony of Nova Scotia. Led by Uniacke, in 1787, 1789 and again on January 11, 1808, the Nova Scotian legislature refused to legalize slavery. Uniacke defeated the efforts of James De Lancey to have slavery legally recognized in Nova Scotia. (The Slave Trade Act 1807 outlawed the slave trade in the British Empire and the Slavery Abolition Act 1833 outlawed slavery altogether.)

=== Immigration ===
In his role as Attorney General, to continue Nova Scotia's economic growth, Uniacke worked to increase the number of immigrants coming to the colony. In part immigration had been hindered by the cancellation of free land grants. In 1806 Uniacke pushed for a renewal of the granting of land to settlers. Furthermore, he moved to escheat large tracts of land, from holders whose only intent was to speculate on the lands they held, feeling this had further slowed the influx of new settlers. By 1820 he had escheated 100,000 acres (400 km^{2}). These lands then became available to the government which allowed them to provide new land grants to the many immigrants that landed in the Province after the Napoleonic wars. From 75,000 people in 1815, Nova Scotia's population reached 200,000 in 1838.

=== Education ===
Uniacke was also instrumental in the establishment in 1789 of King's College (see also King's Collegiate School) at Windsor, and he sat, despite being a non-Anglican, on its board.

=== Military service ===
Throughout the French Revolutionary Wars and the Napoleonic Wars, the threat of invasion was an every looming specter. To counter the threat Nova Scotia maintained a militia. In 1793 Uniacke was second-in-command of the Second Battalion of the militia and in 1794 was promoted to Lieutenant-colonel of the Eighth Battalion.

=== Personal Conflicts ===
Uniacke was perceived as a voice for the Pre-Loyalist settlers of Nova Scotia which brought him into conflict with the arrival of powerful United Empire Loyalists officials including John Wentworth, appointed Lt. Governor in 1792 and the lawyer and judge Sampson Salter Blowers who twice challenged Uniacke to duels. The second duel challenge came about after Loyalist Jonathan Sterns, the Solicitor General and an ally of Blowers, accused Uniacke of being biased against Loyalists in the courts. This led to a street fight between Sterns and Uniacke in 1798. Sterns was in poor health and died shortly afterwards. Blowers blamed Uniacke for the death and challenged him to a duel. The duel was called off when both men were bound to keep the peace by the Halifax magistrates, but Uniacke and Blowers remained lifelong enemies.

=== Confederation ===
Uniacke was the first public figure to advocate for the Confederation of Canada, 51 years before it became a reality. He wanted to save the colonies from republicanism and atheism of the United States. As a result, Uniacke advocated unions of the Maritime colonies and of the Canadas, beginning in 1806 when he presented a memoir on British North America at the Colonial Office. In 1826 Uniacke brought his “Observations on the British colonies in North America with a proposal for the confederation of the whole under one government” to the Colonial Office. The “Observations” read in parts like the British North America Act of 40 years later.

== Family ==
Soon after Uniacke arrived in Nova Scotia to work for Moses Delesdernier, Uniake married Delesderneir's daughter Martha Maria, then aged 12, on May 3, 1775. They would have eleven children before her death in 1803. In 1808 he married Eliza Newton, who bore him a son in 1809. He had twelve children, three sons became lawyers and one became a priest.

His son James Boyle Uniacke was a lawyer and the first Premier of Nova Scotia. Another son, Richard John Uniacke, Jr. was a lawyer, Attorney General of the colony of Cape Breton, judge, and political figure who represented Cape Breton County (after Cape Breton was re-incorporated into Nova Scotia) in the Nova Scotia House of Assembly from 1820 to 1830.

His son Norman Fitzgerald Uniacke studied law in Nova Scotia and in 1798 furthered his law studies in London, entering the law at Lincoln's Inn; the second Nova Scotian to do so. In 1808 he was appointed the Attorney General of Lower Canada, was elevated to the Lower Canada Bench in 1825, and served in the Legislative Assembly of Lower Canada, in later years he joined Nova Scotia's Legislative Council. Norman, as well as his father, were sympathetic to the French Canadians, and from his position on the Bench shielded the captive rebels of the Lower Canada Rebellion from the full brunt of the "bloodhounds of prosecution".

His youngest son Andrew Mitchell Uniacke practiced law in the family firm. Crofton Uniacke practiced law in the family firm, in 1808 was appointed Receiver of Quit Rents, and in 1817 assumed the judgeship of the retiring Justice Croke, only to resign the position in 1819 when he moved to England where he practiced law. Uniacke's son Robert Fitzgerald Uniacke, did not follow his brothers into the law; instead, with his father's blessing, he took a path into the church, becoming minister at St. George's Church, Halifax.

=== St. Paul's Church, Halifax ===
The family of Richard John Uniacke dominates the plaques and monuments in St. Paul's Church (Halifax).

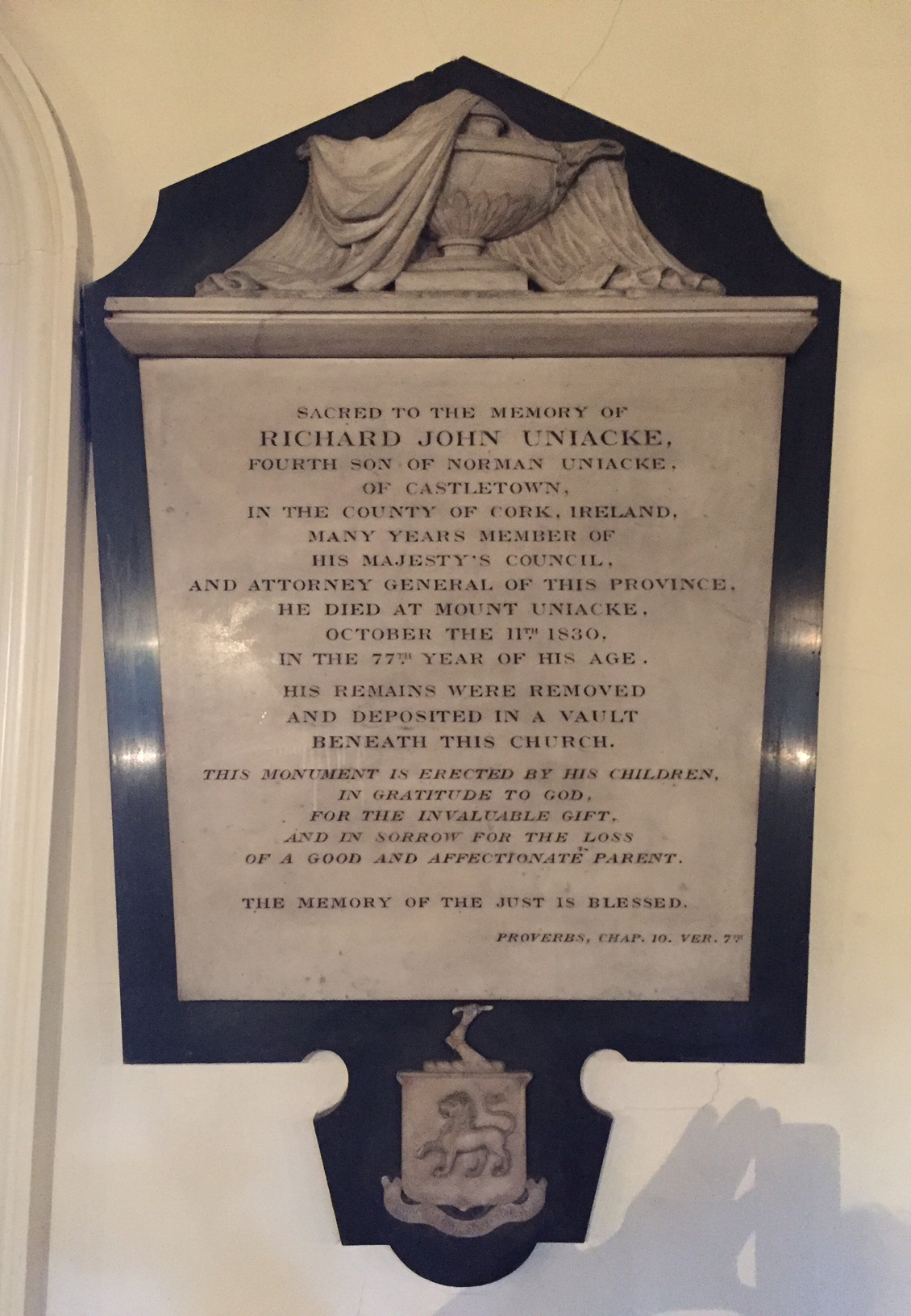
Richard John Uniacke

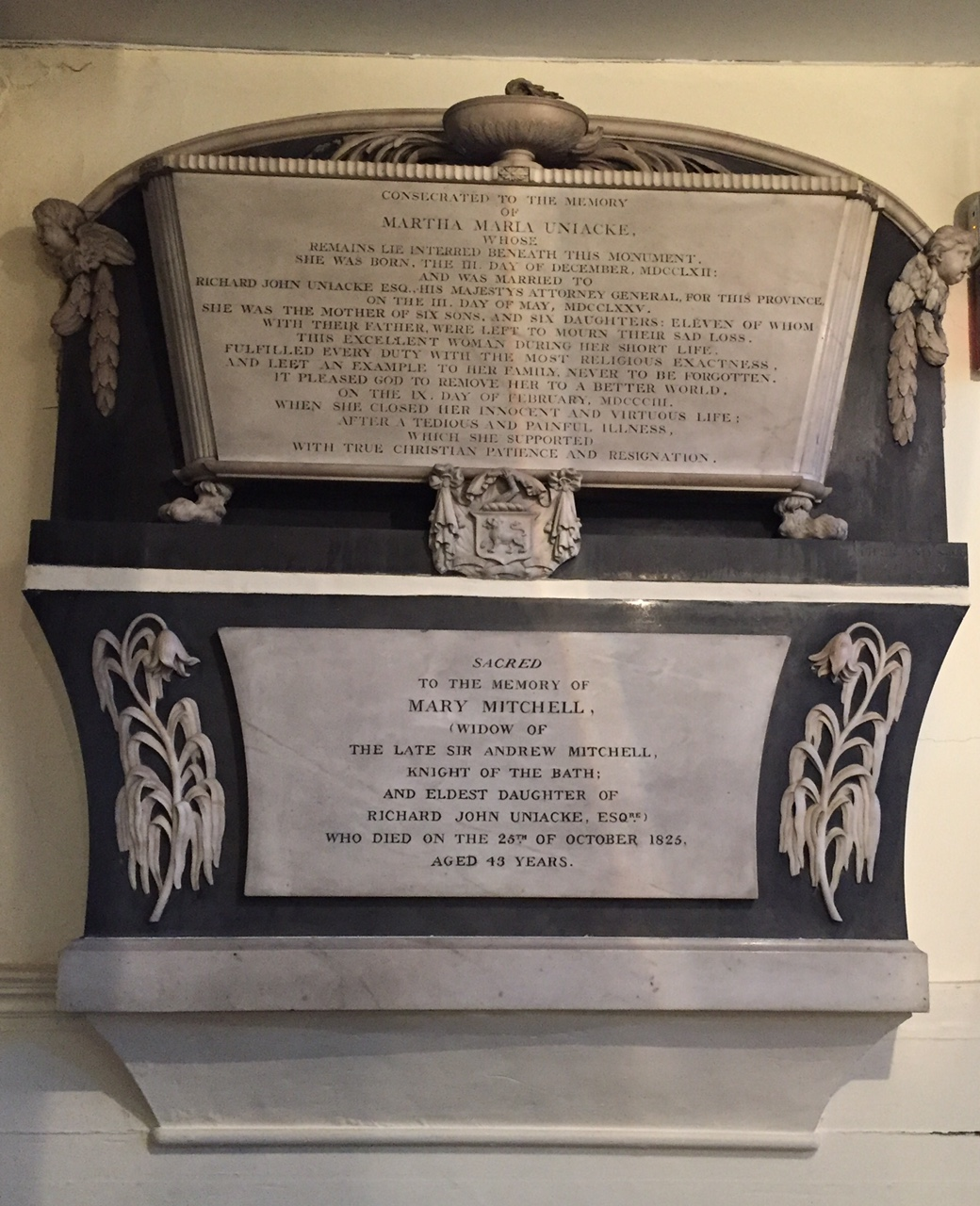
Martha Uniacke

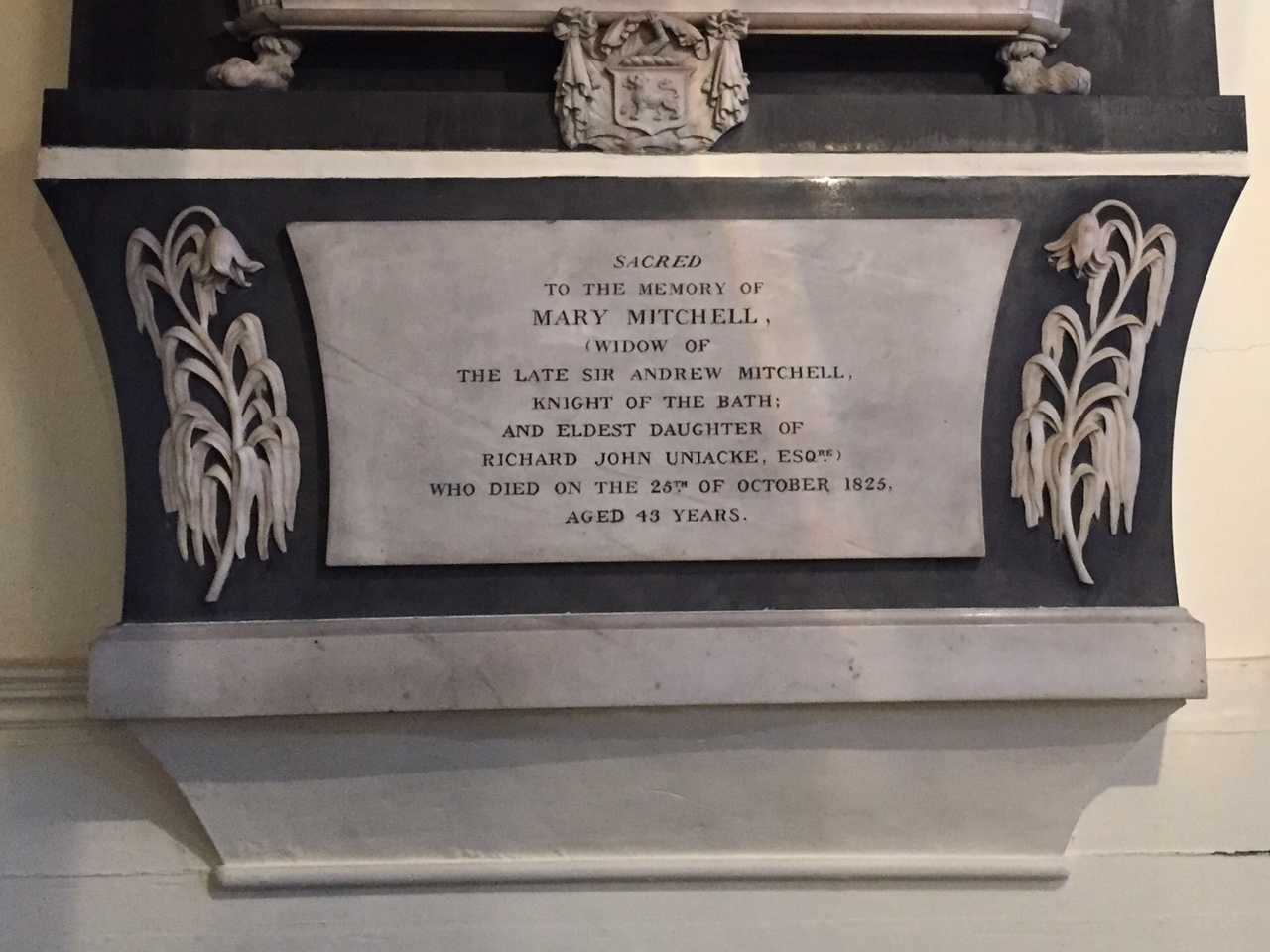
Mary (Uniacke) Mitchell (wife of Andrew Mitchell)

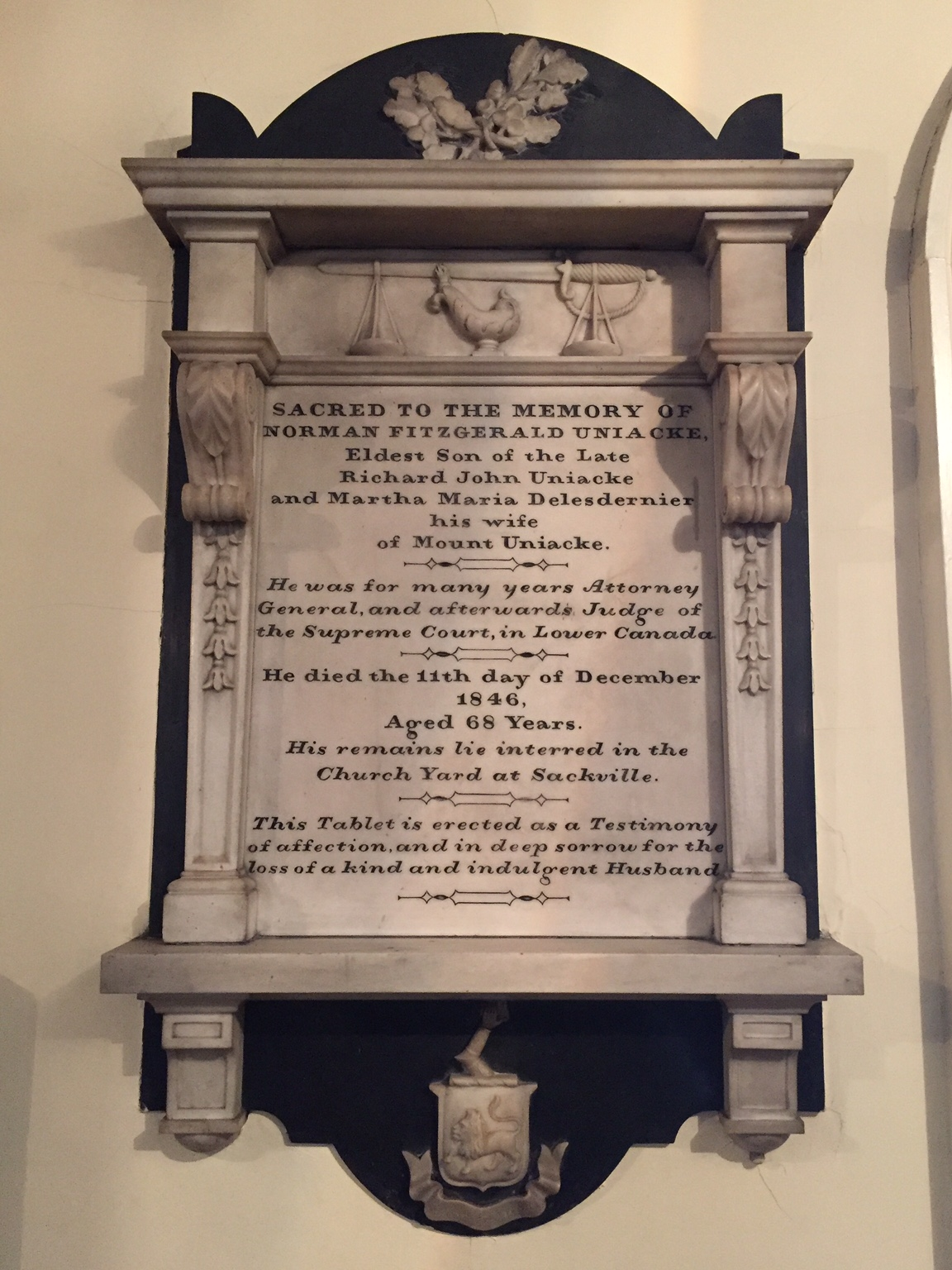
Norman Fitzgerald Uniacke

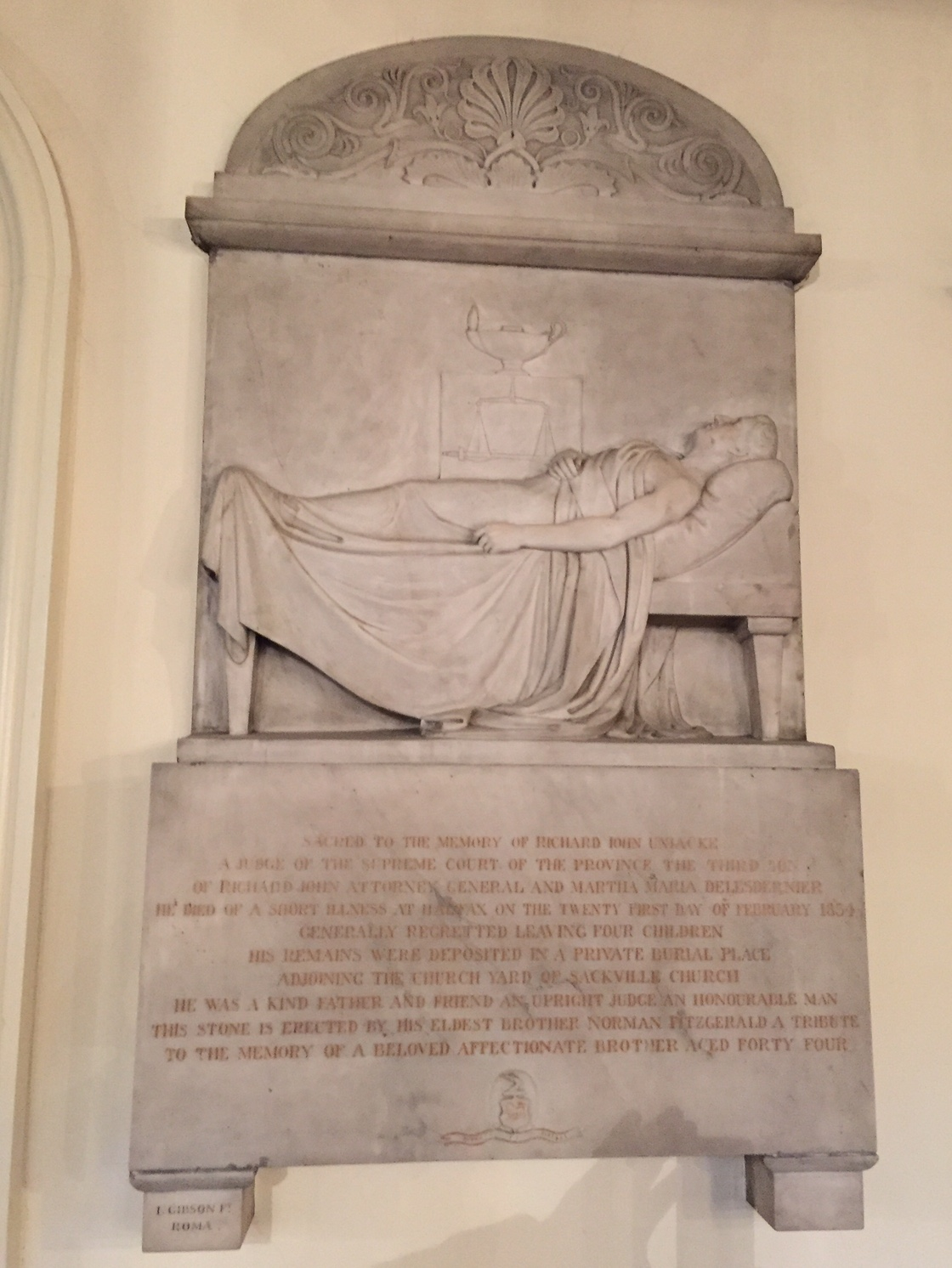
Richard John Uniacke, Jr.

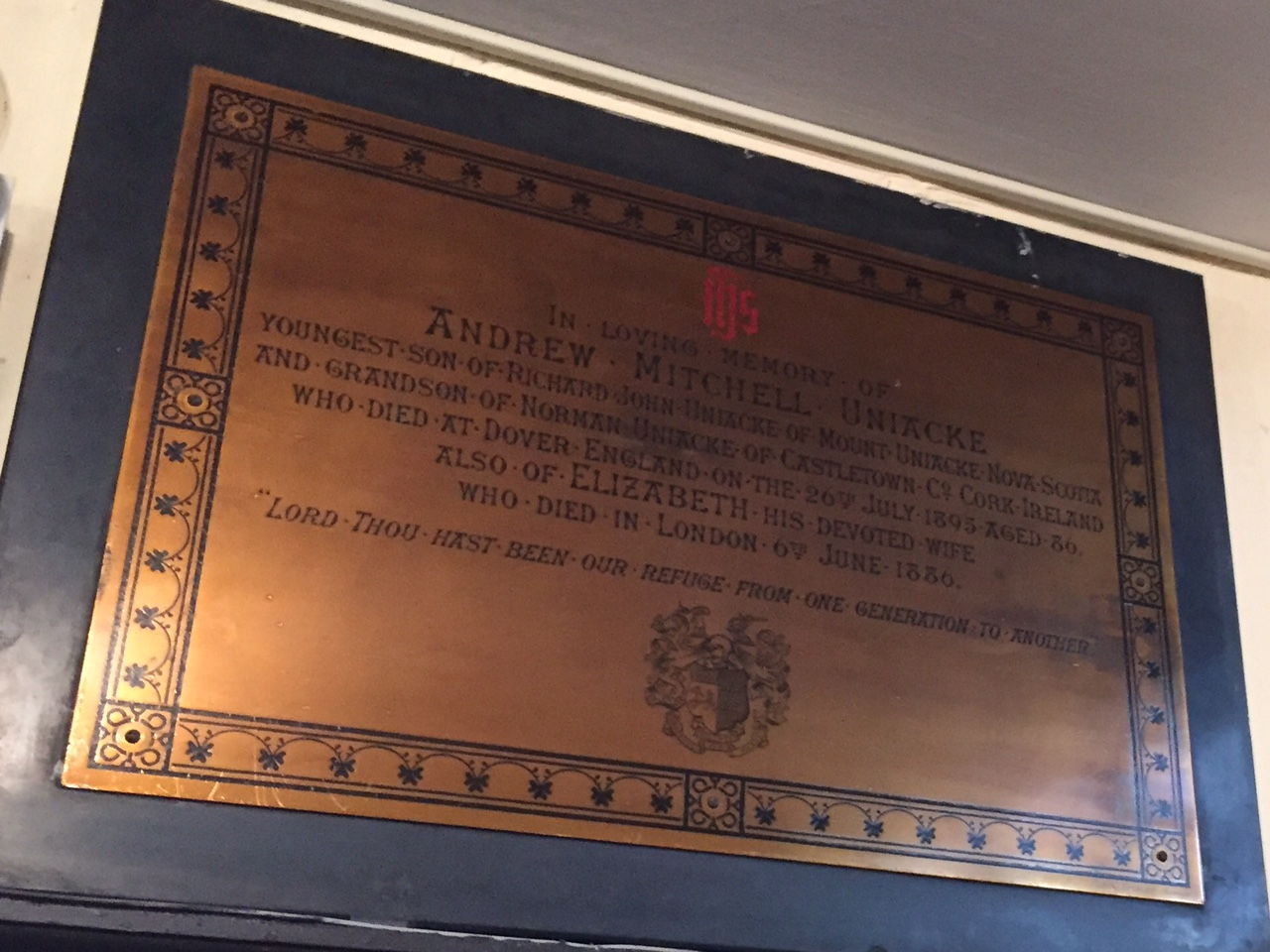
Andrew Mitchell Uniacke

== Legacy ==
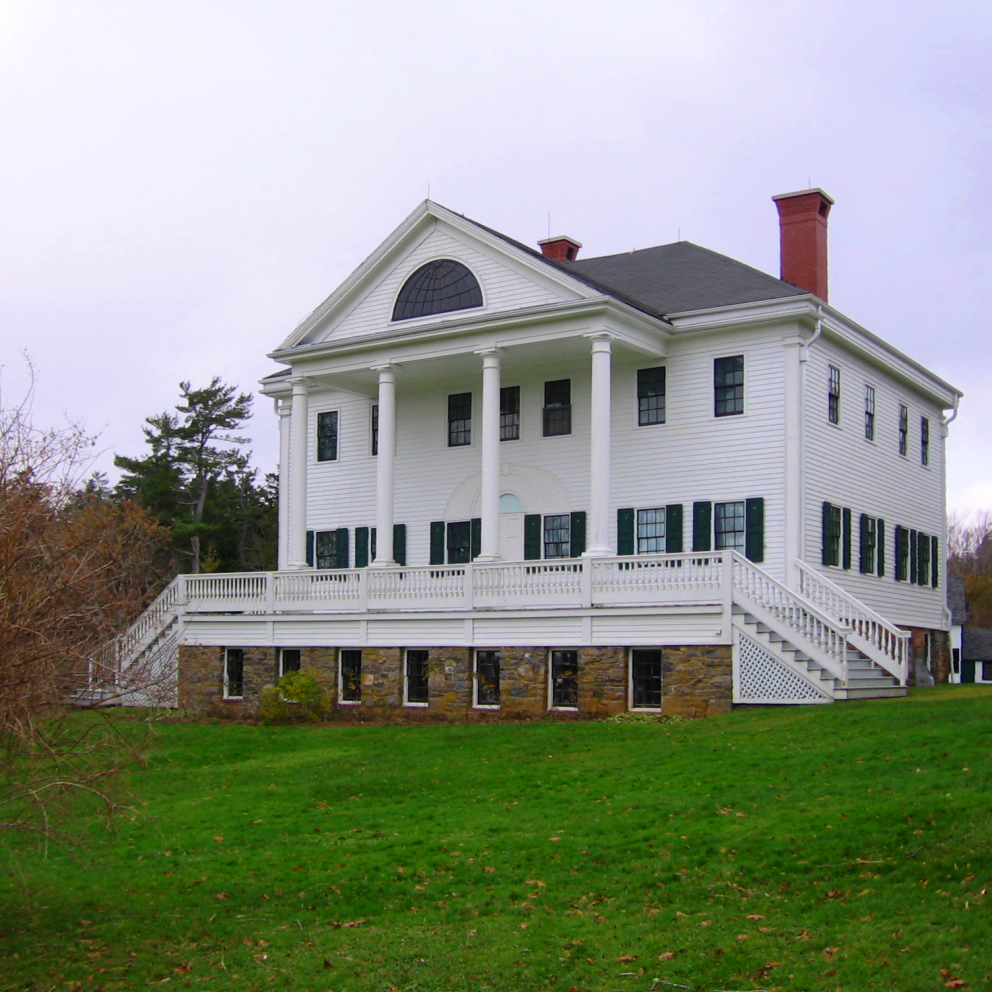
Uniacke House, Uniacke Estate Museum Park, in Mount Uniacke Nova Scotia

His substantial estate (c. 1813) is preserved as the Uniacke Estate Museum Park at Mount Uniacke.

== See also ==
- Decline of Slavery in Nova Scotia
