= Samuel Auchmuty =

Samuel Auchmuty may refer to:

- Samuel Auchmuty (clergyman) (1722–1777), American Anglican minister.
- Samuel Auchmuty (British Army officer) (1756–1822), British lieutenant-general and Commander-in-Chief, Ireland
- Samuel Benjamin Auchmuty (1780–1868), Anglo-Irish general in India

== See also ==
- Samuel Auchmuty Dickson (1817–1870), Irish politician
