= Henry Barclay =

American minister

The Reverend Henry Barclay D.D.
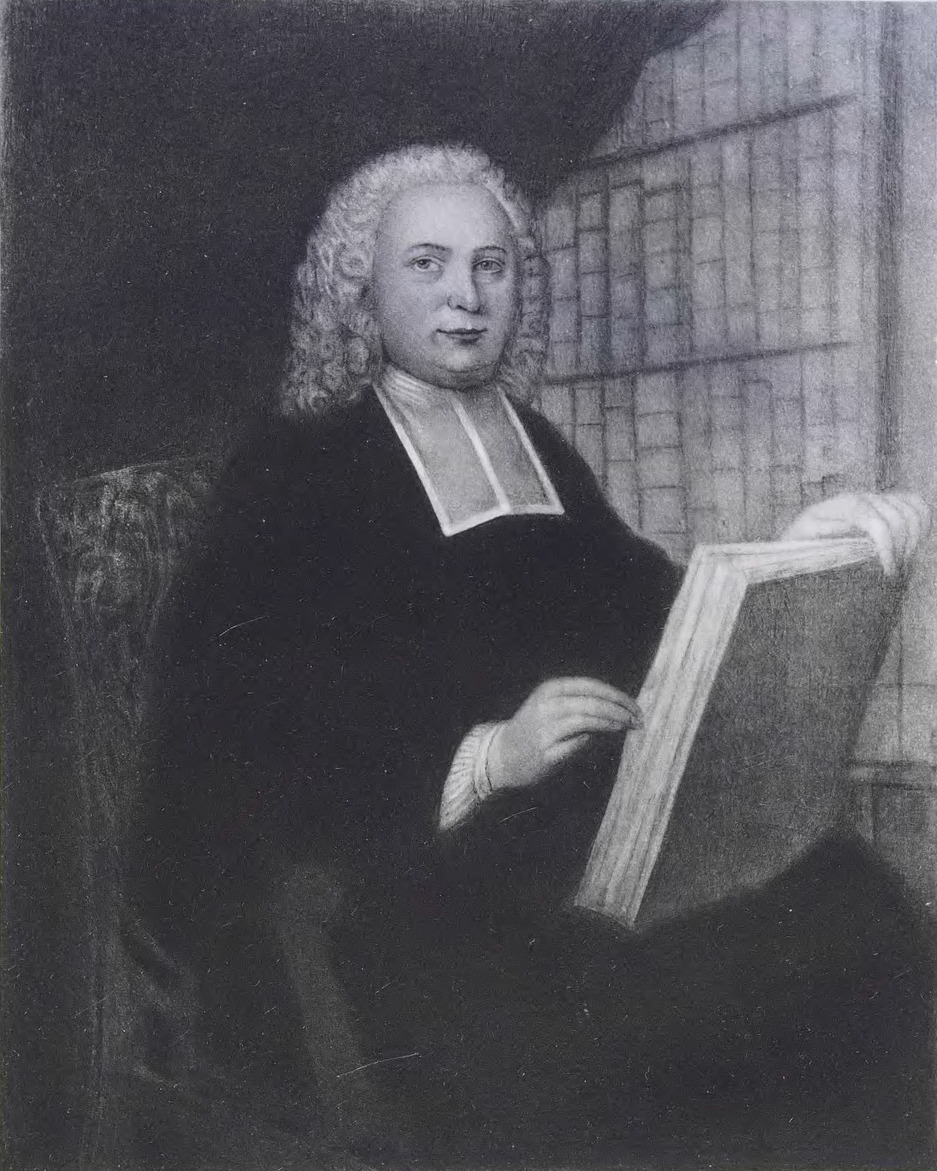

Personal details
- Born: 1712 Albany, Province of New York
- Died: August 20, 1764 (aged 51–52)
- Buried: Trinity Church Cemetery, New York City, U.S.

Reverend Henry Barclay (1712 – August 20, 1764) was an American Anglican minister who served as the second rector of Trinity Church in New York City from 1746 until his death eighteen years later.

== Early life ==
Barclay was born in 1712 in Albany, Province of New York, to Reverend Thomas Barclay and Anna Drayer. He graduated from Yale University with a bachelor's degree in 1734 and a master's degree six years later.

== Ministry ==
In 1735, the year following his graduation from Yale, Barclay was installed as a catechist to the Mohawk Indians at Fort Hunter.

He went to England in 1737, a trip organized by the Society for the Propagation of the Gospel, and was ordained by the Bishop of London. Upon returning to America, he was appointed rector of Albany's St. Peter's Episcopal Church.

In 1745, it is alleged that, with word that "white people [from Albany]" were en route to Fort Hunter to attack the Mohawks, Barclay left for Manhattan in April the following year. This irreversibly damaged his relationship with the Mohawks, who in 1740 had sold him around 300 acres (120 ha) of land due to their "love and esteem" for his work with them.

Barclay became the second rector of Trinity Church in Manhattan in 1746, succeeding William Vesey, who died in office. He remained in the role for the next eighteen years.

In 1760, Barclay studied at Oxford University, graduating as a Doctor of Divinity (D.D.).

== Personal life ==
In 1749, Barclay married Mary Rutgers, daughter of Anthony Rutgers and Cornelia Roos, with whom he had four children: Cornelia, Thomas, Anna and Anthony. Thomas became a noted lawyer. A fifth child died in infancy.

== Death ==
Barclay died in 1764, aged 51 or 52. He was interred in the Trinity Church Cemetery at Wall Street and Broadway in Manhattan. His widow survived him by 24 years. Her burial details are not known.

He was succeeded as rector of Trinity by Samuel Auchmuty.
