= LentSpace =

Outdoor art space in Manhattan, New York

Coordinates: 40.722781°N 74.005971°W

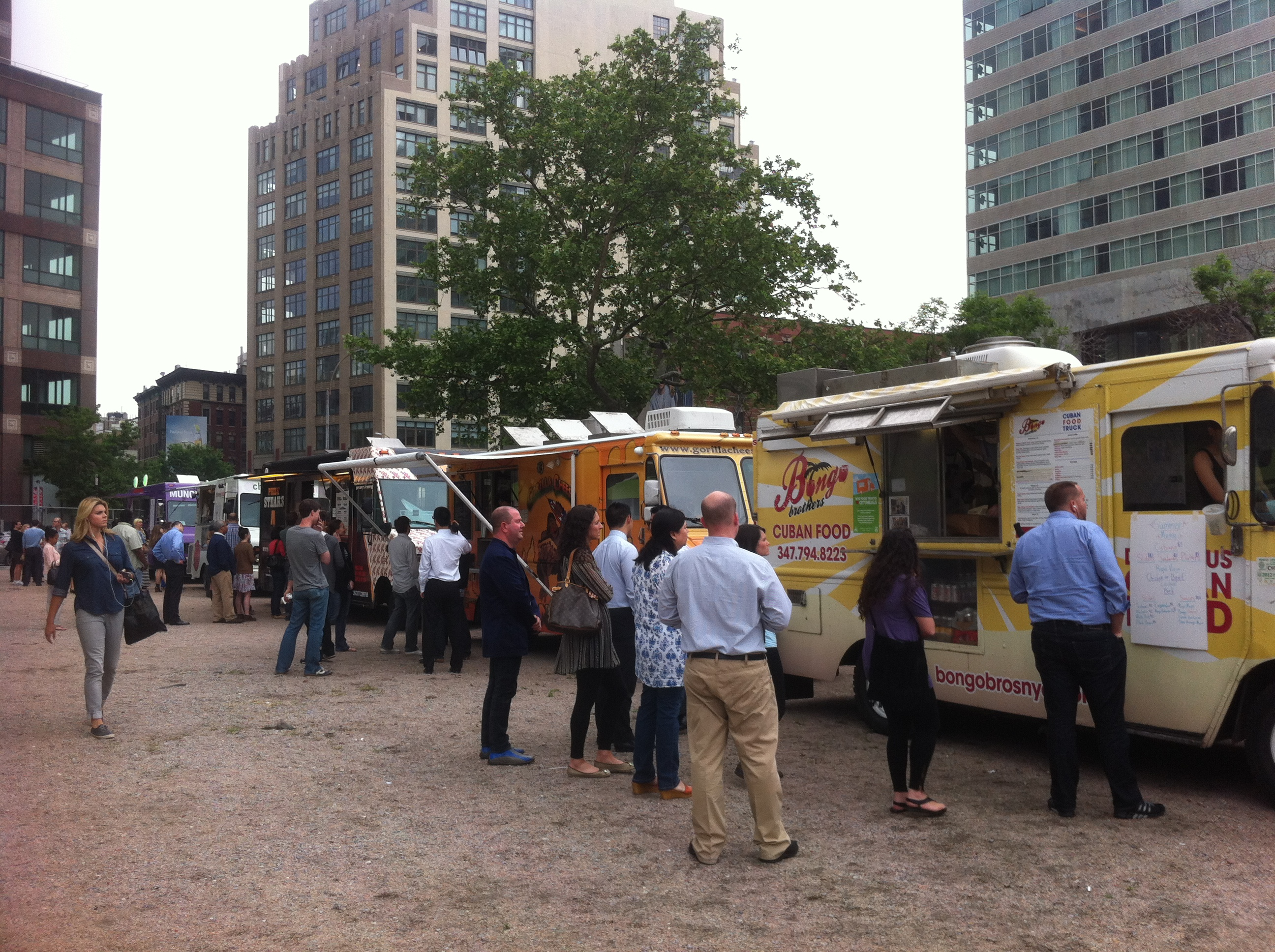
Food trucks in LentSpace in 2012

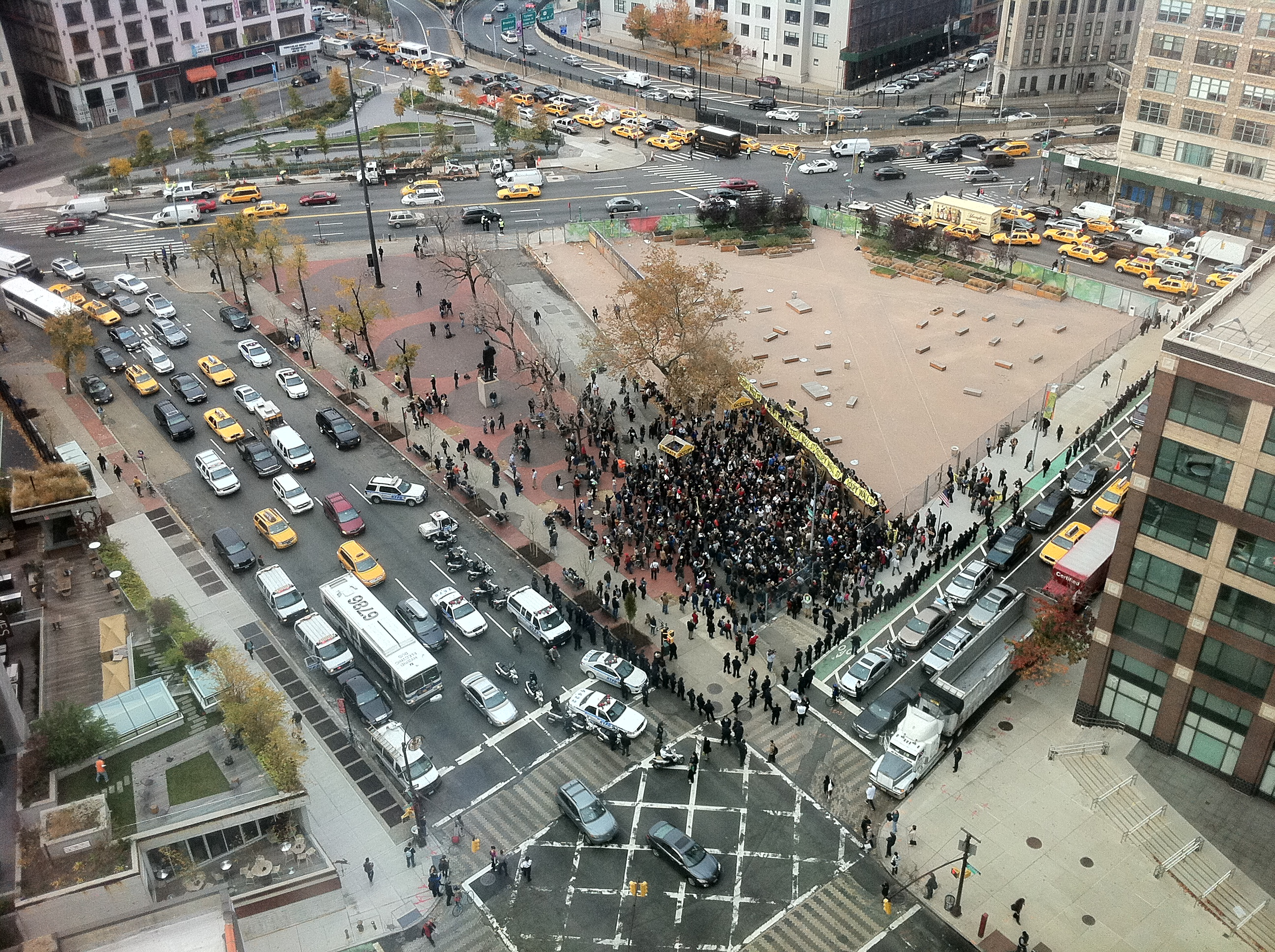
Aerial view of the Occupy protesters in Duarte Square (left), outside of LentSpace (right) in November 2011

LentSpace was a temporary outdoor art space and sculpture garden located in Hudson Square, Lower Manhattan, New York City. The space, which opened in September 2009, is bounded by Varick Street to the west, Canal Street and Albert Capsouto Park to the south, Grand Street to the north, and Sullivan Street and Duarte Square to the east.

== History ==
The block occupied by LentSpace is part of a parcel of land granted to Trinity Church by Queen Anne in 1705. In the years prior to the park's opening in 2009, the church's development company demolished a number of buildings previously located on the site.

The land is owned by Trinity Church and was slated for eventual development. The church negotiated a deal with the Lower Manhattan Cultural Council (LMCC) to use the idle space for a period of about three years.

LMCC raised about $1 million to transform the empty lot into a space to promote art in the neighborhood. Interboro Partners of Brooklyn designed the landscape, incorporating inexpensive materials such as gravel and plywood, reflecting the temporary nature of the space. The park is surrounded by a fence, the eastern edge of which is decorated with small, reflective aluminum disks. The interior features planters, benches and straight paths.

The inaugural show in the space was entitled "Points and Lines" and featured seven installations by Graham Hudson, Eli Hansen and Oscar Tuazon, Ryan Tabor, Tobias Putrih, Olga Chernysheva, Corban Walker and Oliver Babin. The pieces all referenced civic design and construction techniques, using materials such as flagpoles, ladders, concrete and steel.

Since then, the space has been used for a variety of different purposes. In 2010 LentSpace was featured in an episode of Bravo's reality TV show, Work of Art: The Next Great Artist. In the summer of 2012 the space became home to a rotating lineup of food trucks, accompanied by musical performances throughout the week.

In late 2011, protesters from the Occupy movement briefly occupied the space after being evicted from Zuccotti Park. Trinity Church had denied permission for the protestors to use the space. On December 17, some protesters scaled the fences which surrounded the park while others squeezed beneath the fences. New York City Police Department officers arrested a number of protesters, including retired Episcopal Bishop George Elden Packard.

In 2019, Trinity Church selected Taconic Partners and its investment partner Nuveen Real Estate to develop the space formerly occupied by LentSpace. In March 2024, Taconic Partners unveiled plans for a 28-story office tower with a public school and retail on its first floor, named One Grand, to be built on the site.
