= Duarte Square =

Public park in Manhattan, New York

Coordinates: 40°43′21″N 74°00′20″W

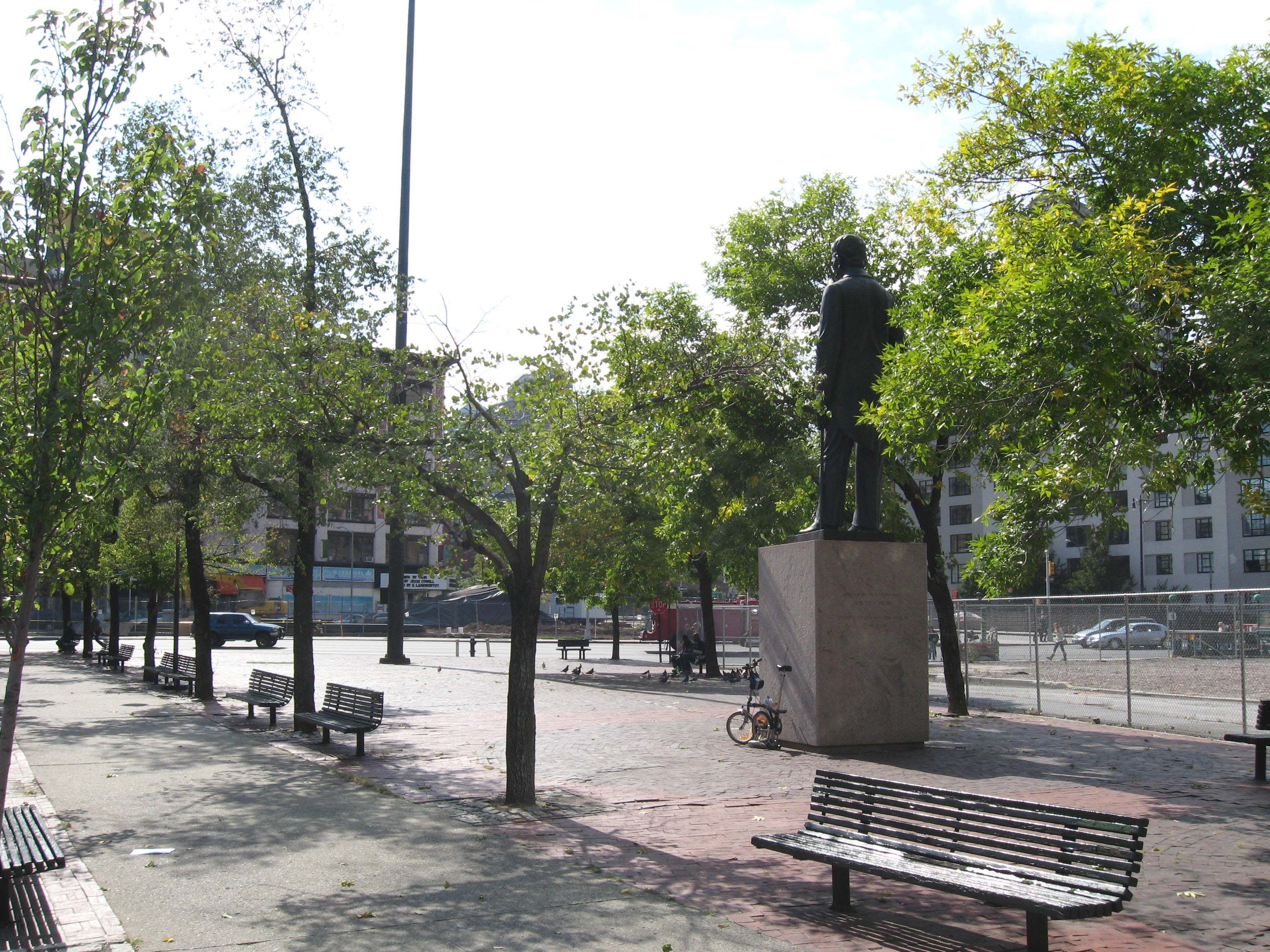
View from north end of Duarte Square

Juan Pablo Duarte Square, usually shortened to Duarte Square, is a 0.45-acre (0.18 ha) triangular park in Hudson Square, in Lower Manhattan, New York City. The park, operated by the New York City Department of Parks and Recreation (NYC Parks), is bound by Sullivan Street and the LentSpace plot to the west, Grand Street to the north, Sixth Avenue to the east, and Canal Street and Albert Capsouto Park to the south.

== History ==
In the late 17th century, the plot was a farm owned by Trinity Church. The square in its current form was officially dedicated in 1945 in concert with the renaming of Sixth Avenue to the Avenue of the Americas "in celebration of Pan-American unity". In 1975 benches, trees and sidewalks were added to the square. On May 26, 1977, control of the square was transferred from the New York State Department of Transportation to NYC Parks. In 1978, the Consulate of the Dominican Republic dedicated a statue of Juan Pablo Duarte in the square. The dedication took place on the 165th birthday of Duarte, who was one of the founding fathers of the Dominican Republic. Italian sculptor Nicola Arrighini designed the thirteen-foot bronze figure, which today rests atop an eight-foot granite base. This statue is one of a group of six other monuments to Latin American leaders throughout the Avenue of the Americas.

== LentSpace ==
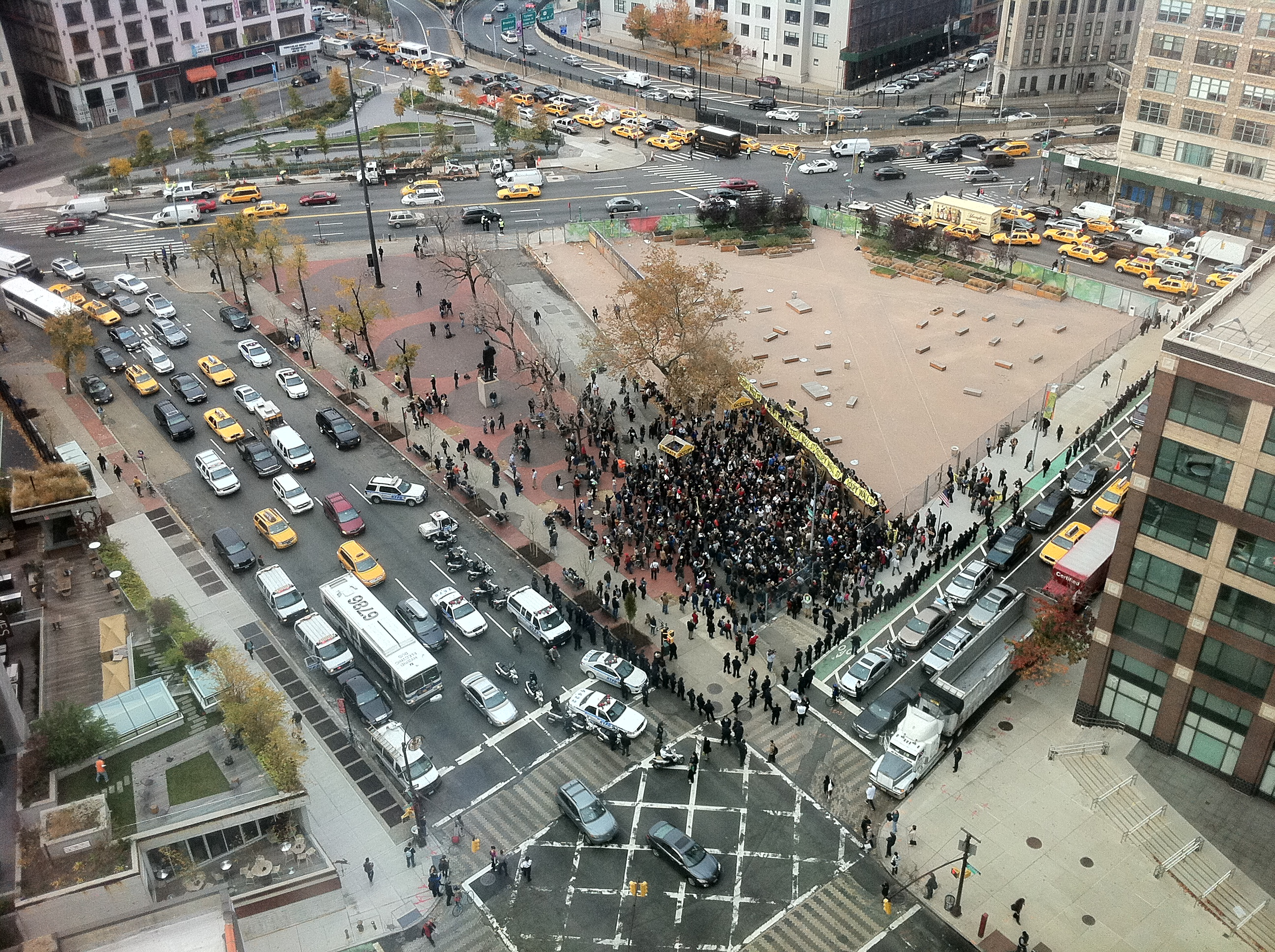
Protestors in Duarte Square (left) massing at the boundary of LentSpace (right)

To the immediate west of NYC Parks' portion of Duarte Square, across a one-block stretch of Sullivan Street that is now closed to traffic, is a plot owned primarily by Trinity Wall Street (a parish of the Episcopal Diocese of New York) and also known as "Duarte Square". It is fenced off and leased for a non-profit arts program known as LentSpace. This plot was targeted by the Occupy Wall Street organization as a new campsite. On December 17, 2011, after demonstrating in Duarte Park and marching on the streets surrounding the park, occupiers climbed over and under the fence. Police responded by arresting about 50 demonstrators, including at least one Episcopal bishop.
