= Thomas Henry Barclay =

American lawyer

Speaker of the House of Assembly of Nova Scotia
- In office 1793–1799
- Preceded by: Richard John Uniacke
- Succeeded by: Richard John Uniacke

Member of the General Assembly of Nova Scotia for the Town of Annapolis
- In office 1793–1799
- Preceded by: James De Lancey
- Succeeded by: Phineas Lovett

Member of the General Assembly of Nova Scotia for Annapolis County
- In office 1785–1793
- Preceded by: Phineas Lovett
- Succeeded by: Thomas Millidge

Personal details
- Born: October 12, 1753 New York City, Province of New York, British America
- Died: April 21, 1830 (aged 76) New York City, New York, U.S.
- Resting place: St. Mark's Church in-the-Bowery, East Village, Mahattan, U.S.
- Spouse: Susan DeLancey (m. 1775)
- Children: 12
- Parent(s): Henry Barclay; Mary Rutgers
- Education: King's College

Thomas Henry Barclay (October 12, 1753 – April 21, 1830) was an American lawyer who became one of the United Empire Loyalists in Nova Scotia and served in the colony's government.

== Early life ==
Thomas Henry Barclay came from a prominent New York family, the son of the Reverend Henry Barclay (1712–1764), an Anglican clergyman who served as second rector of Trinity Church in New York City, and Mary Rutgers, the daughter of a wealthy brewer. His paternal uncle was merchant Andrew Barclay, who married Helena Roosevelt, granddaughter of Nicholas Roosevelt.

After attending King's College (later Columbia University), he studied law with John Jay and was called to the bar in 1775.

== American Revolutionary War ==
Shortly after his marriage in 1775, his career was interrupted by the beginning of the American Revolutionary War. Barclay served with distinction, as a major, in the "Loyal American Regiment", in the British Loyalist forces, throughout the war and, with the confiscation of his New York property and having been named specifically in a Bill of Attainder in that state, he chose to join the loyalists heading to Canada.

=== Resettlement in British Canada ===
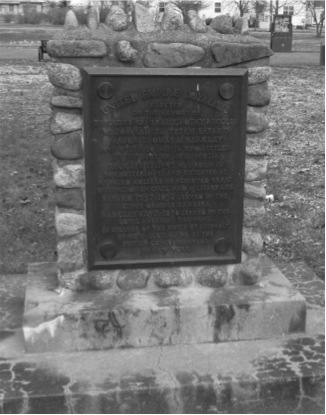
Monument to Major Thomas Barclay of the Loyal American Regiment, Middleton Park, Middleton, Nova Scotia, Canada

After considering New Brunswick, Thomas Henry Barclay opted for Nova Scotia where the forces were given land grants. At one point, he had moved to Annapolis Royal and began a law practice.

In 1785, he was elected to the 6th General Assembly of Nova Scotia representing Annapolis County while Edmund Fanning was governor. The next year, John Parr became governor. In 1793, Barclay was elected for Annapolis Township and served as speaker for the assembly. He also served as lieutenant-colonel in the colony's militia and was boundary commissioner for the British when the border between the United States and New Brunswick was settled in Jay's Treaty. Although he was appointed to the Council for Nova Scotia in 1799, he was given the post of British consul general in New York City later that year succeeding Sir John Temple. Barclay was recalled to London for the duration of the War of 1812.

Following the War of 1812, he became a member of another boundary commission dealing with another section of the border with the United States. In 1822, he settled at a country home on Manhattan.

== Personal life ==
In 1775, Thomas Henry Barclay married Susan DeLancey (1754–1837), a granddaughter of Stephen Delancey. Together, they were the parents of 12 children, including:

- Eliza Barclay (1776–1817), who married Peter Schuyler Livingston (1772–1809), the son of Walter Livingston, in 1796.
- Henry Barclay (1778–1851), who married Catherine Watts (1782–1851), daughter of Robert Watts, in 1817.
- DeLancey Barclay (1780–1826), who married Mary Fairfield, widow of Gurney Barclay, in 1825.
- Maria Barclay (1782–1862), who married Simon Fraser in 1806.
- Thomas Edmund Barclay (1783–1838), who married Catherine Smith Channing, daughter of Walter Channing, in 1821.
- Susannah Barclay (1785–1805), who married Peter Gerard Stuyvesant (1777–1847), in 1803. After her death, he married Helena Rutherfurd.
- Anne Barclay (1788–1869), who married William Burrington Parsons (1794–1869) in 1815. They were the grandparents of William Barclay Parsons.
- George Barclay (1790–1869), who married Louise Matilda Aufrere (1792–1868), in 1818.
- Anthony Barclay (1792–1877), who married Anna Matilda Waldburg (1795–1887), daughter of J. Bartholomew Waldburg, in 1816, who took over as British Commissioner under the 6th and 7th articles of the Treaty of Ghent.
- Henry Barclay (1794–1863), who married Sarah Ann Moore (1809–1873), daughter of Daniel Sackett Moore, in 1842. They were the parents of James Lent Barclay (1848–1925).

== Death ==
Thomas Henry Barclay died in 1830 and was buried in graveyard of St. Mark's Church in-the-Bowery.
