= Sixth Avenue =

North-south avenue in Manhattan, New York City

- Avenue of the Americas
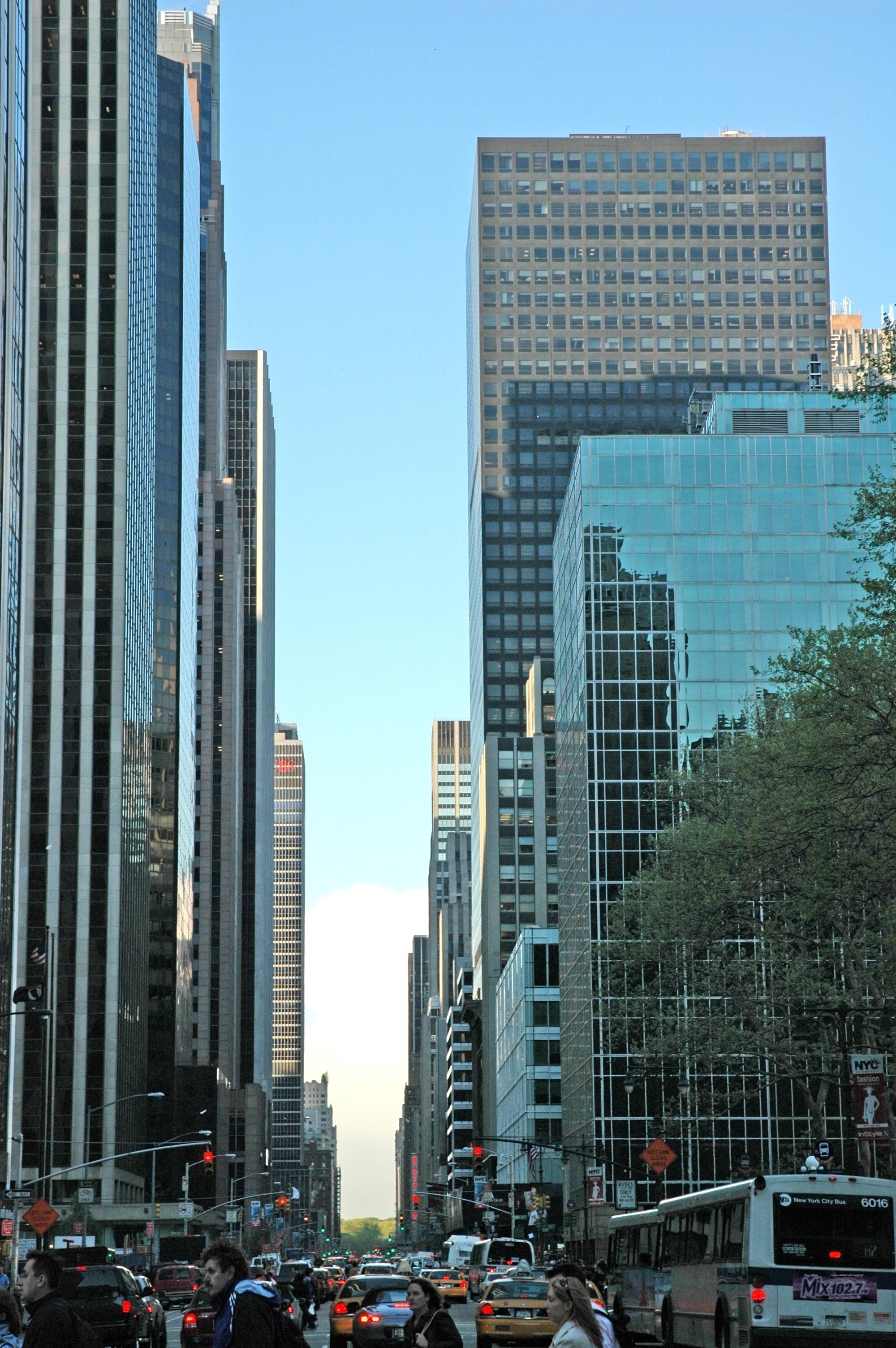
- The "skyscraper alley" of International Style buildings along the avenue looking north from 40th Street to Central Park
- Namesake: The Americas
- Owner: City of New York
- Maintained by: NYCDOT
- Length: 3.7 mi (6.0 km)
- Location: Manhattan, New York City
- South end: Church / Franklin Streets in Tribeca
- Major junctions: Herald Square in Midtown
- North end: Central Park South (59th Street) / Center Drive in Midtown
- East: Fifth Avenue (north of Waverly Pl)
- West: Varick Street (south of Houston Street); Seventh Avenue (Houston Street to 34th Street); Broadway (between 34th and 45th Streets); Seventh Avenue (between 45th and 59th Streets)

Construction
- Commissioned: March 1811

Sixth Avenue, also known as Avenue of the Americas, is a major corporate and commercial thoroughfare in Lower and Midtown Manhattan, where the avenue hosts the headquarters of three of the four major U.S. television networks. Traffic runs northbound, or uptown, on the avenue.

Sixth Avenue begins four blocks below Canal Street, at Franklin Street in Tribeca, where the northbound Church Street divides into Sixth Avenue to the left and the local continuation of Church Street to the right, which then ends at Canal Street. From this beginning, Sixth Avenue traverses SoHo and Greenwich Village, roughly divides Chelsea from the Flatiron District and NoMad, passes through the Garment District and skirts the edge of the Theater District while passing through Midtown Manhattan. Although it is officially named "Avenue of the Americas", this name is seldom used by New Yorkers.

Sixth Avenue's northern end is at Central Park South, adjacent to the Artists' Gate entrance to Central Park via Center Drive. Historically, Sixth Avenue was also the name of the road that continued north of Central Park, but that segment was renamed Lenox Avenue in 1887 and co-named Malcolm X Boulevard in 1987.

== History ==
=== 19th century ===
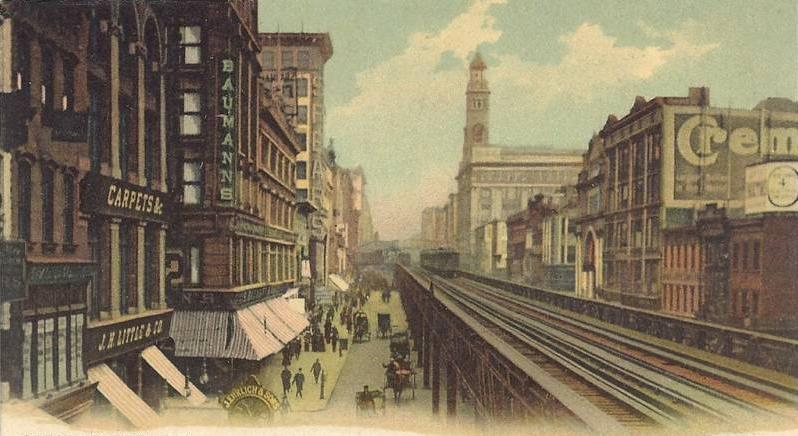
Looking north from 14th Street in 1905, with the Sixth Avenue El on the right

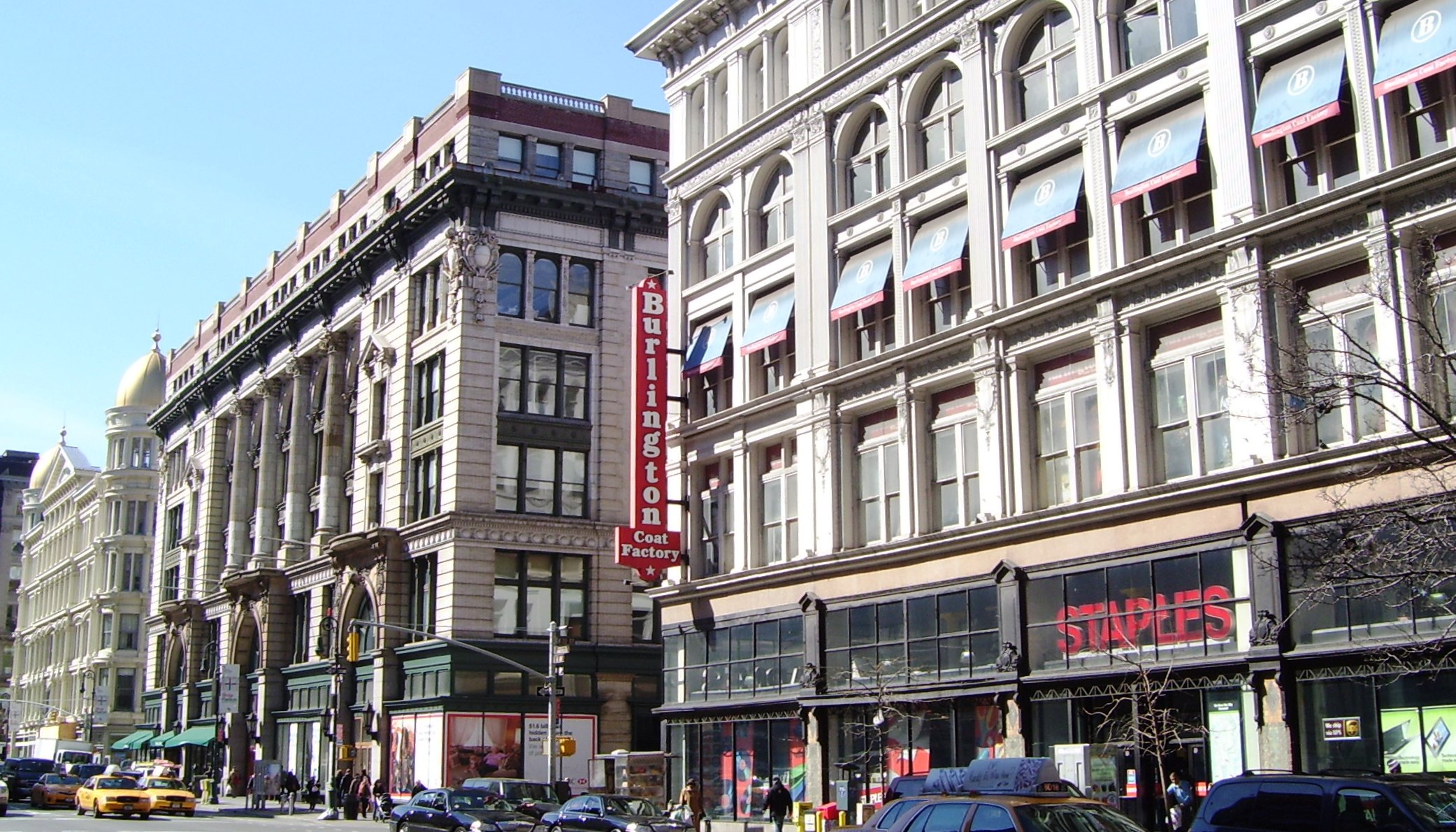
The historic Ladies' Mile shopping district that thrived along Sixth Avenue left behind some of the largest retail spaces in the city. Beginning in the 1990s, the buildings began to be reused after being dormant for decades.

Sixth Avenue was laid out in the Commissioners' Plan of 1811. As originally designed, Sixth Avenue's southern terminus was at Carmine Street in Greenwich Village, and it continued northward to 147th Street in Harlem. Central Park was added to the street grid in 1857 and created an interruption in Sixth Avenue between 59th and 110th Streets. Proposals to extend the street south of Carmine Street were discussed by the city's Board of Aldermen as early as the mid-1860s. The IRT Sixth Avenue Line elevated railway (the "El") was constructed on Sixth Avenue in 1878, darkening the street and reducing its real-estate value. In the early and mid-1800s Sixth Avenue passed by the popular roadhouse and tavern, Old Grapevine, at the corner of 11th Street, which at the time was the northern edge of the city.

In late 1887, the Harlem portion of what was then considered Sixth Avenue was renamed Lenox Avenue for philanthropist James Lenox; a century later it was co-named Malcolm X Boulevard, in honor of the slain civil rights leader Malcolm X.

=== Early 20th century ===
Starting in 1926, as part of the construction of the Holland Tunnel, Sixth Avenue was widened and extended from Minetta Lane to Canal Street. Smaller side streets in the extension's path were also demolished or incorporated into the extended avenue. The Sixth Avenue extension also allowed for the construction of the Independent Subway System (IND)'s Eighth Avenue Line, which was to run below Sixth Avenue south of Eighth Street. To accommodate the new subway, buildings were condemned and demolished to extend Sixth Avenue southward. Construction of the extension resulted in considerable dislocation to existing residents, as ten thousand people were evicted to make way for the Sixth Avenue extension. One historian stated that most of the displaced residents were "Italian immigrants who knew no other home in America". According to the WPA Guide to New York City, the extension resulted in blank side walls facing the "uninspiring thoroughfare" and small leftover spaces. Dozens of buildings, including the original Church of Our Lady of Pompeii, were demolished. After the renumbering of the street's properties in 1929, the Sixth Avenue extension was opened to traffic in 1930, and the subway line was completed two years later. Sixth Avenue, the only numbered avenue to extend south of Houston Street, thus became the southernmost numbered avenue in Manhattan. House numbering of existing buildings was adjusted.

Sixth Ave Shopping District about 1909

=== Mid-20th century ===
By the 1930s, a coalition of commercial establishments and building owners along Sixth Avenue campaigned to have the El removed. The El was closed on December 4, 1938, and came down in stages, beginning in Greenwich Village in 1938–39. The replacement Sixth Avenue subway, which ran between Houston and 53rd Streets with a transfer to the Eighth Avenue line at West Fourth Street, opened in 1940.

The demolition of the Sixth Avenue elevated railway also resulted in accelerated commercial development of the avenue in Midtown. Beginning in the 1960s, the avenue was entirely rebuilt above 42nd Street as an all-but-uninterrupted avenue of corporate headquarters housed in glass slab towers of International Modernist style. Among the buildings constructed was the CBS Building at 52nd Street, by Eero Saarinen (1965), dubbed "Black Rock" for its full-height black-granite piers; this designated landmark is Saarinen's only skyscraper. Another group of modernist structures along Sixth Avenue in midtown was the "XYZ Buildings" (1971–1974) at 1211, 1221, and 1251 Sixth Avenue.

On March 10, 1957, Sixth Avenue was reconfigured to carry one-way traffic north of its intersection with Broadway in Herald Square. The rest of the avenue followed on November 10, 1963.

==== Renaming and co-naming ====
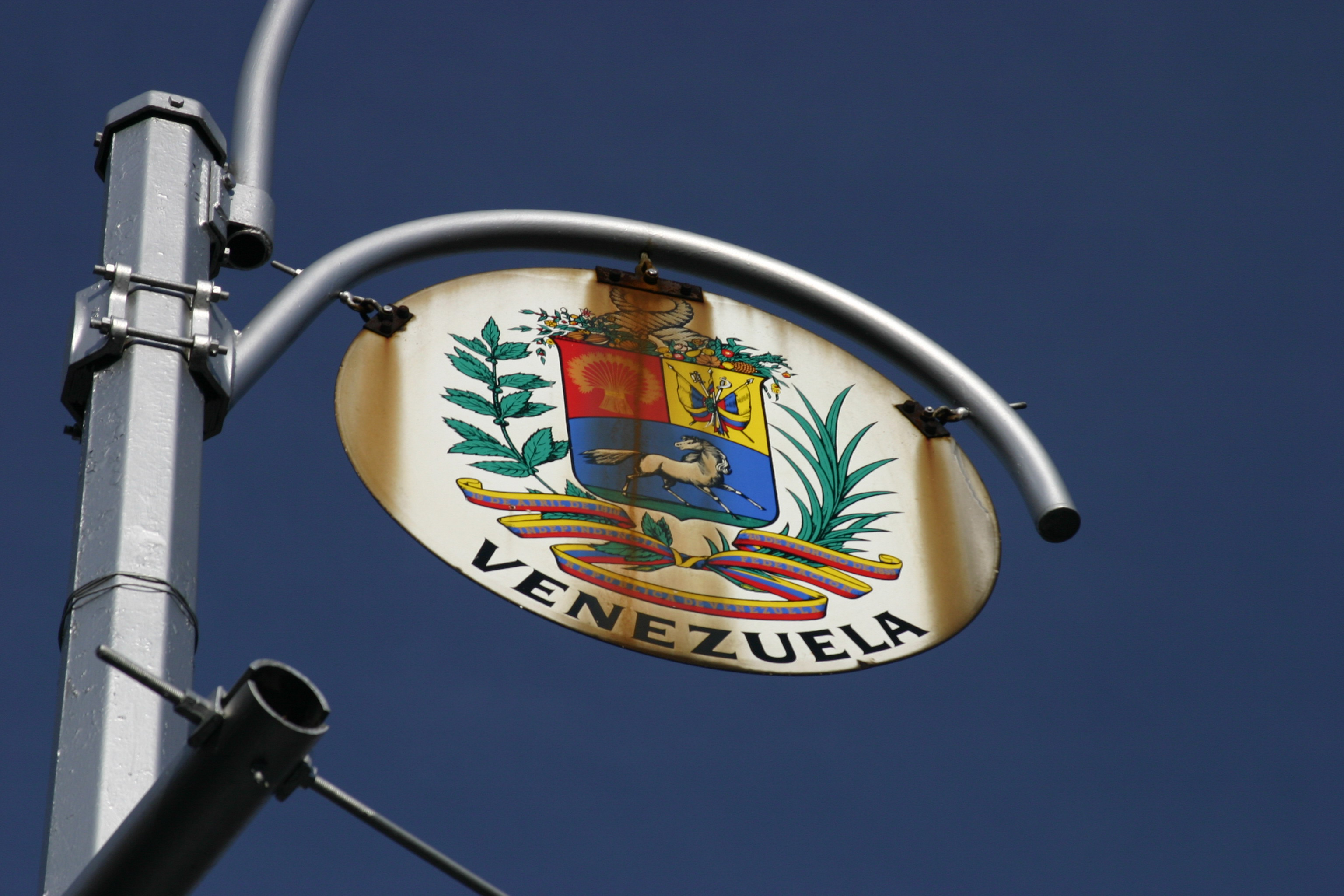
Sign for Venezuela on Sixth Avenue

The avenue's official name was changed to Avenue of the Americas in 1945 by the City Council, at the behest of Mayor Fiorello La Guardia, who signed the bill into law on October 2, 1945. The intent was to honor "Pan-American ideals and principles" and the nations of Central and South America, and to encourage those countries to build consulates along the avenue. It was felt at the time that the name would provide greater grandeur to a shabby street and promote trade with the Western Hemisphere.

After the name change, round signs were attached to streetlights on the avenue, showing the national seals and coats of arms of the nations honored. However, New Yorkers rarely used the avenue's newer name, and in 1955, an informal study found that locals used "Sixth Avenue" more than eight times as often as "Avenue of the Americas". The move was criticized as "propaganda" by those who wanted to return to the original name. Most of the old round signs with country emblems were gone by the late 1990s, and the ones remaining, which were only present between Canal Street and Washington Place in Greenwich Village and in Midtown around 57th Street began showing signs of age. However, starting in March 2023, the city began to install new signs along most of the length of the avenue, in addition to replacing the remaining original signs.

=== Late 20th century to present ===
In the mid-1970s, the city "spruced up" the street, including the addition of patterned brick crosswalks, repainting of streetlamps, and new pedestrian plazas. Special lighting, rare throughout the rest of the city, was also installed. The administration of Mayor Ed Koch added a protected bike lane to Sixth Avenue between Eighth Street/Greenwich Avenue and Central Park South; the lane carried 200 cyclists an hour at peak times. The barriers between the bike lane and the vehicular lanes were removed in November 1980.

Manhattan Community Board 2 voted in 2014 to request a feasibility study for a protected bike lane on Sixth Avenue. The protected bike lane between 35th Street and Central Park South was reinstated in October 2020, following advocacy from cyclists. At the time, Sixth Avenue had two discontinuous segments of bike lanes, separated by a 20-block stretch with no bike lane. The southern segment ran from Franklin Street to Canal Street, while the northern segment ran from Eighth Street to Central Park South. Community Board 2 was reviewing plans for a protected bike lane from Lispenard Street (just south of Canal Street) to Eighth Street by mid-2024, and plans for a bike lane between these two intersections were announced in October 2024. The same month, as part of a reconstruction of the parallel Fifth Avenue in Midtown, Mayor Eric Adams proposed widening Sixth Avenue's bike lane for two-way bike traffic. This project did not advance.

In advance of the 2026 FIFA World Cup, in May 2026, the NYCDOT widened the bike lane between 14th and 31st Streets. That June, the NYCDOT announced plans to extend Sixth Avenue's existing bus lane (which runs between 34th and 58th Streets) south to Watts Street. The existing curbside bus lane would be replaced by an offset bus lane, shifted one lane away from the curb, and a second bus lane would be added along parts of the avenue. The protected bike lane between 36th and 59th Streets would also be widened.

== Notable buildings and events ==
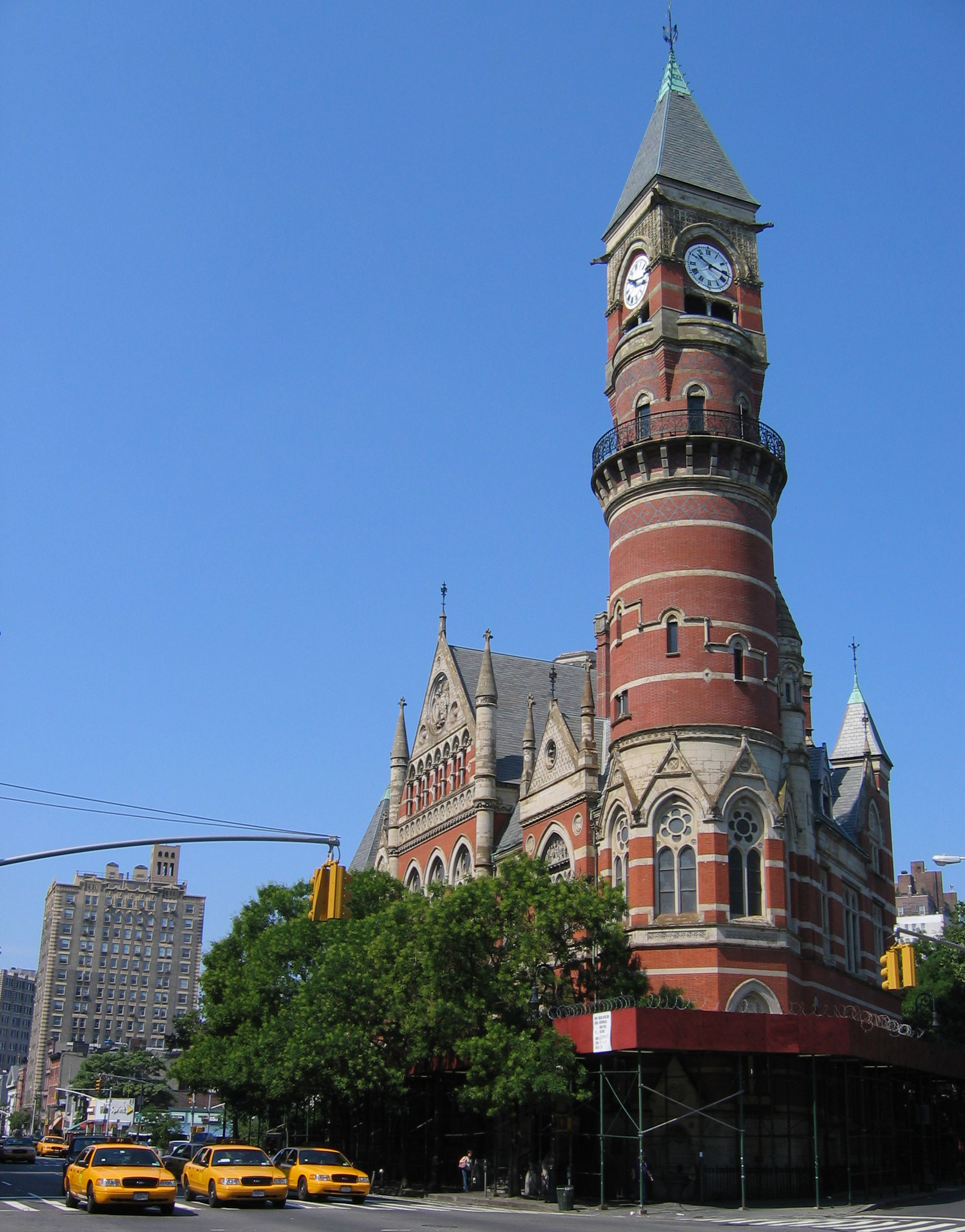
Jefferson Market Library in Greenwich Village

Sights along Sixth Avenue include Juan Pablo Duarte Square; the polychrome High Victorian Gothic Jefferson Market Courthouse, currently occupied by the Jefferson Market Library; the surviving stretch of grand department stores of 1880 to 1900 in the Ladies' Mile Historic District that runs from 18th Street to 23rd Street; the former wholesale flower district; Herald Square at 34th Street, site of Macy's department store; and Bryant Park from 40th to 42nd Streets. The corporate stretch above 42nd Street contains the Bank of America Tower, W. R. Grace Building, International Center of Photography, Rockefeller Center (including the Time-Life Building, News Corp. Building, Exxon Building, McGraw-Hill Building, and Radio City Music Hall) and the CBS Building.

Sixth Avenue is the site of the annual Village Halloween Parade in Greenwich Village and the Dominican Day Parade in Midtown.

== Mass transit ==
Sixth Avenue is served by the New York City Subway with the IND Sixth Avenue Line (B, D, F, <F>, and M trains) north of Houston Street, and the IND Eighth Avenue Line (A, C, and E trains) south of Greenwich Avenue. The Harlem portion of Sixth Avenue (Lenox Avenue) is served by the IRT Lenox Avenue Line (2 and 3 trains) north of Central Park North (110th Street). The PATH's Uptown Hudson Tubes to New Jersey also run under Sixth Avenue (JSQ–33, HOB-33, and JSQ-33 (via HOB) trains) from 9th to 33rd Streets.

The M55 runs south of West 44th Street, where it terminates, while the M5 and M7 run north of West 31st and West 14th Streets, respectively. The latter begins Harlem service at West 16th Street and uses 7th Avenue downtown; the rest use 5th Avenue. Additional service is provided by the eastbound M21 from Spring to West Houston Streets.

== In popular culture ==
The avenue is referenced both in the name and in the lyrics of "6th Avenue Heartache" by The Wallflowers.

== See also ==
- 6½ Avenue
