= Sir John Temple, 8th Baronet =

British diplomat (1731–1798)

Sir John Temple Bt
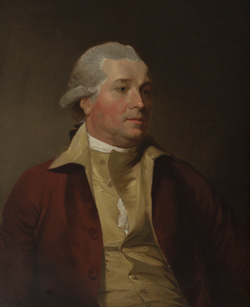
- Portrait by Gilbert Stuart after a work by John Trumbull

Consul-General of Great Britain to the United States
- In office 1785–1798
- Monarch: George III
- Preceded by: Office established
- Succeeded by: Thomas Henry Barclay

Personal details
- Born: April 1732 Boston, Province of Massachusetts Bay, British America
- Died: 17 November 1798 (aged 66) New York City, U.S.
- Resting place: St. Paul's Chapel
- Spouse: Elizabeth Bowdoin
- Children: 3
- Parents: Robert Temple (father); Mehetabel Nelson (mother)
- Occupation: Diplomat

Sir John Temple, 8th Baronet (1731 – 17 November 1798) was an Anglo-American politician and diplomat. He was first British consul-general to the United States and the first British diplomat to have been born in what later became the United States. His claim to the Temple Baronetcy is disputed.

== Early life ==
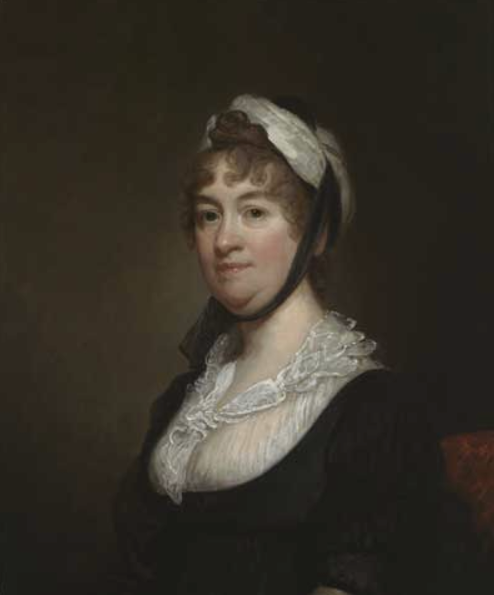
Gilbert Stuart, Elizabeth Bowdoin, oil on wood, 1806

John Temple was born in Boston in 1731. His father, Robert Temple (1694–1754), was a captain in the British army, and his mother was Mehitabel Nelson (1691–1775) of Boston.

== Career ==
In 1762, he was appointed lieutenant governor of the Province of New Hampshire and surveyor general of customs.

Temple was politically aligned with the populist faction in Massachusetts politics, and strongly opposed to the domination of colonial rule by Thomas Hutchinson and the Oliver family. Temple may have played a role in the Hutchinson letters affair of 1773 that inflamed political tensions in Massachusetts and led to the recall of Hutchinson, who was then governor of the province.

In 1785, he was appointed consul-general to the United States, and remained in this post in New York City until his death (succeeded by Thomas Henry Barclay).

=== Baronetcy ===
Following the death of Sir Richard Temple, 7th Baronet in 1786, John Temple claimed the Temple Baronetcy of Stowe on the basis of a declaration by George Nugent-Temple-Grenville, 1st Marquess of Buckingham, but his claim is disputed. It is not recognised, for instance, by Cracroft's Peerage, which considers the baronetcy to be dormant. However, his claim seems to have been generally recognised during his lifetime and his son's, for example by Burke's Peerage.

His eldest son Grenville succeeded to his claim to the baronetcy.

== Personal life ==
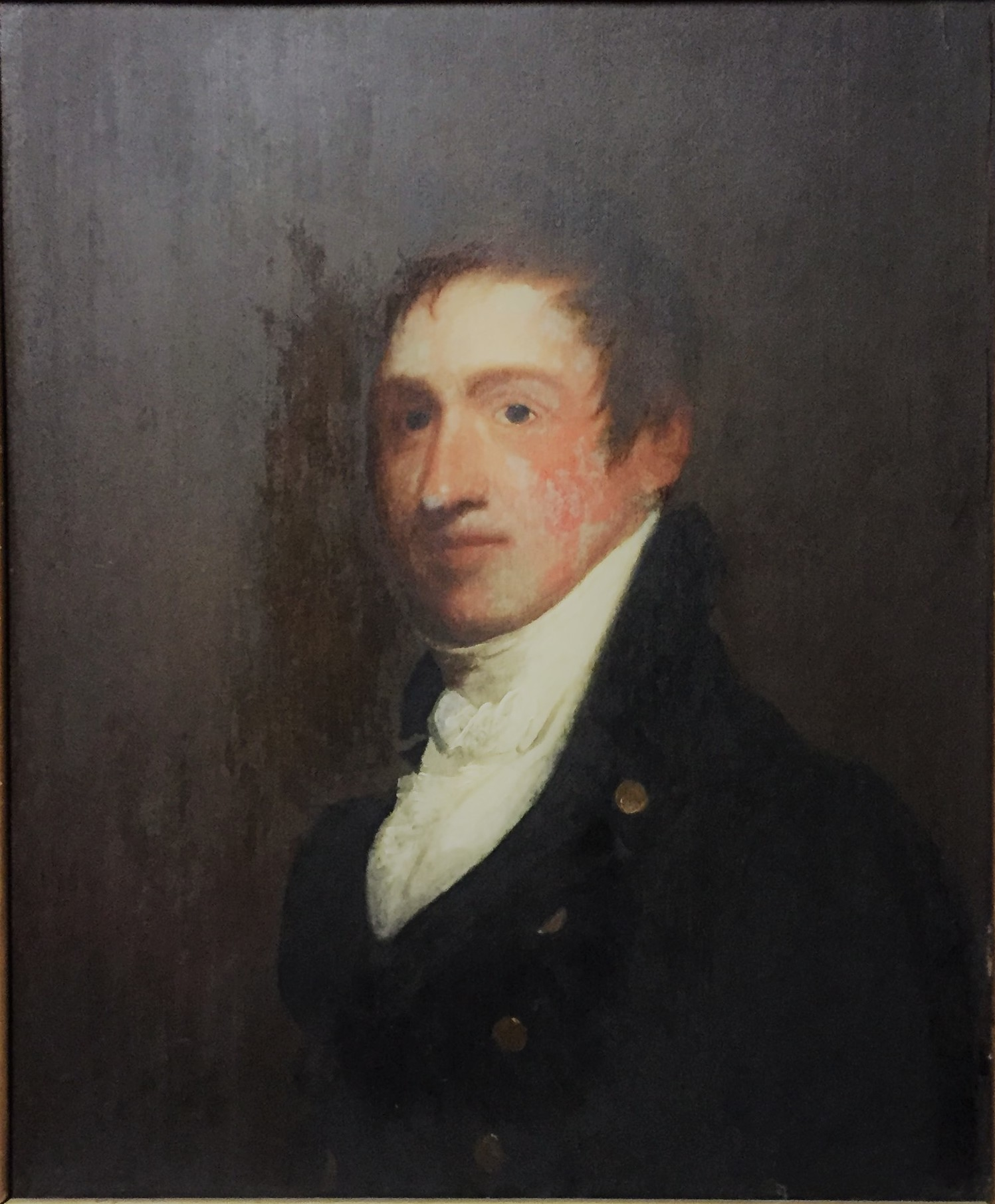
Sir Grenville Temple, 9th Baronet, 1812

In 1767, he married Elizabeth Bowdoin (1750–1809), daughter of James Bowdoin, who later became Governor of Massachusetts. Together, they were the parents of:

- Sir Grenville Temple, 9th Baronet (1768–1829), who married Elizabeth Watson. After his death, he was buried in the English Cemetery, Florence.
- Elizabeth Bowdoin Temple (1769–1825), who married Thomas Lindall Winthrop (1760–1841), who later became the 13th Lieutenant Governor of Massachusetts.
- Augusta Grenville Temple (1779–1852), who married William Lambe Palmer of England, a British army captain with the 18th Light Dragoons.

Temple died 17 November 1798.

=== Descendants ===
Through his eldest son Sir Grenville Temple, he was the grandfather of Sir Grenville Temple, the 10th Baronet (1799–1847), who published "Travels in Greece and Turkey and the Mediterranean", in 1843. He is also, through his daughter Elizabeth Bowdoin Temple an ancestor of U.S. Politician John Kerry.

Baronetage of England
Preceded by Richard Temple	Temple baronets (of Stowe); 1786–1798; Disputed	Succeeded by Grenville Temple
