= William Tylden =

British Army officer

Brigadier General William Burton Tylden (8 April 1790 – 22 September 1854) was a British Army officer of the Royal Engineers who served for 43 years at home and abroad.

== Life ==
He was born the son of Richard Tylden of Milsted Manor, Kent by his second wife, Jane, daughter of the Reverend Dr. Samuel Auchmuty and brother of Samuel on 8 April 1790. Sir John Maxwell Tylden was his elder brother. After passing through the Royal Military Academy, Woolwich at Woolwich, London, Tylden received a commission as second lieutenant in the Royal Engineers on 6 November 1806, and was promoted to first lieutenant on 1 May 1807. He embarked for Gibraltar on 8 January 1808, arriving on 10 March, and was employed in the revision of the fortifications. In September 1811 he went to Malta, and thence, at the end of October, to Messina. He was promoted to be second captain on 15 April 1812.

Tylden was commanding royal engineer, under Lord William Bentinck, at the siege of Santa Maria in the Gulf of Spezzia, and at its capture on 29 March 1814, and was thanked in general orders for his exertions. He was mentioned in despatches and Admiral Rowley expressed his indebtedness to him for assistance to the navy at the batteries. Tylden was also commanding royal engineer of the Anglo-Sicilian army under Bentinck at the action before Genoa on 17 April, when the French were defeated, and he took part in the investment of the city and the operations which led to the surrender of the fortress on 19 April 1814. He was thanked in general orders, mentioned in despatches (London Gazette, 8 May 1814), and on 23 June received promotion for his services to the brevet rank of major. He was also appointed military secretary to Bentinck, commander-in-chief in the Mediterranean, and occupied the post until his return to England in August.

In November 1814 Tylden joined the army in the Netherlands, and took charge of the defences of Antwerp. In 1815 he organised and commanded a train of eighty pontoons, with which he took part in the operations of the allies, the march to and capture of Paris, and the occupation of France. He returned to England in 1818. In June 1822 he went again to Gibraltar, and served there as second in command of the royal engineers until May 1823, when he returned to England, and was stationed at Portsmouth. He was promoted to be first captain in the royal engineers on 23 March 1825. In November 1830 he was appointed commanding royal engineer at Bermuda. He returned home in July 1836, and was commanding royal engineer of the eastern military district, with headquarters at Harwich. He was promoted to be lieutenant-colonel of royal engineers on 10 January 1837. In May 1840 he went to Malta as commanding royal engineer, returning to England in October 1844, when he was appointed commanding royal engineer of the south-eastern military district and stationed at Dover. He was promoted to be colonel of royal engineers on 21 Sept. 1850, having arrived at Corfu in June of that year as commanding royal engineer in the Ionian Islands.

=== Crimea ===
From Corfu Tylden was sent in February 1854 to join the army in the east. He arrived at Constantinople on the 12th of that month, and on the 21st was made a brigadier-general on Lord Raglan’s staff and commanding royal engineer of the army. He was busy until May with the defences of the lines of Gallipoli. On the change of base from Gallipoli to Varna, Tylden went there, and when the Russians raised the Siege of Silistra in the middle of June, and it was decided to invade the Crimea, he prepared the necessary works for embarking and disembarking the army and its munitions of war, and collected siege materials. On the occasion of the great fire at Varna on 10 August Tylden was chiefly instrumental in saving the town from entire destruction by protecting two large gun¬powder magazines with wet blankets when the fire had reached within thirty yards of them.

Tylden proceeded to the Crimea with the army, and took part in the Battle of the Alma on 20 September 1854. Lord Raglan in his despatch referred to him as being ‘always at hand to carry out any service I might direct him to undertake.’ He was taken ill with virulent cholera on the night of 21 September, and died on the evening of the 22nd. He was buried in a vineyard before the army marched on the morning of the 23rd. In the orders issued on the occasion it was stated that ‘no officer was ever more regretted, and deservedly so.’ It was announced in the London Gazette of 5 July 1855 that, had Tylden survived, he would have been made a knight commander of the Bath, and in the Gazette of 8 September 1856 his widow was authorised to bear the same style as if her husband had been duly invested with the insignia.

== Family ==
Tylden married first, at Harrietsham, Kent, on 20 August 1817, Lecilina, eldest daughter of William Baldwin of Stedehill, Kent; and secondly, at Dover on 20 February 1851, Mary, widow of Captain J. H. Baldwin, and eldest daughter of the Reverend S. Dineley Goodyar, rector of Otterden, Kent. He had two sons by his first wife, William, curate of Stanford, Kent, and Richard Tylden (1819–1855) who followed his father into the Royal Engineers and was on his staff in Crimea. The other son, the Reverend Richard, became curate of Stanford, Kent.
