= Samuel Auchmuty (British Army officer, born 1758) =

British Army officer (1758–1822)

Lieutenant-General The Right Honourable Sir Samuel Auchmuty GCB
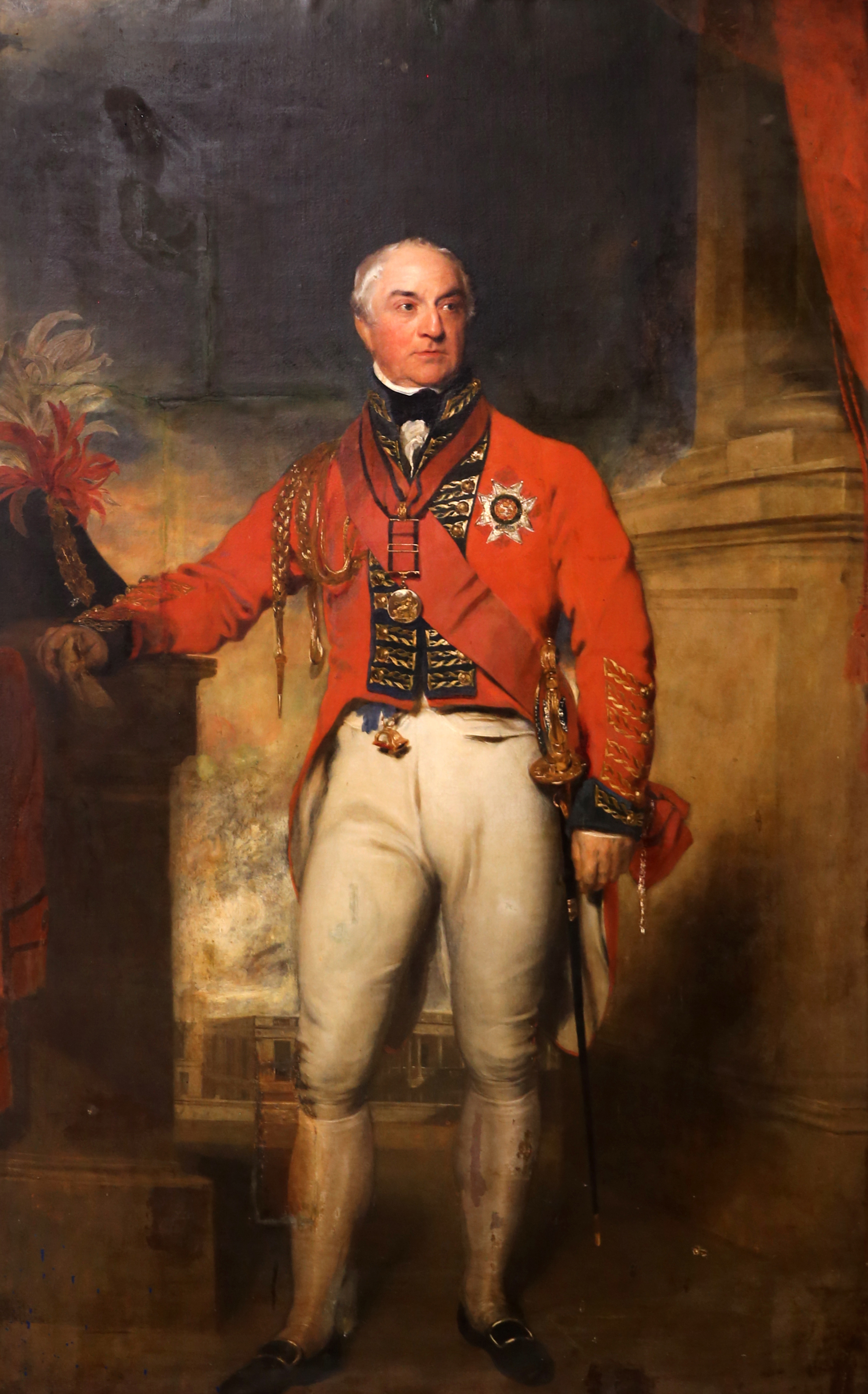
- Portrait by Sir Thomas Lawrence, c. 1810
- Born: 22 June 1758; New York City, Province of New York
- Died: 11 August 1822 (aged 64); Phoenix Park, Dublin
- Relatives: Samuel Auchmuty (father)
- Military career
- Allegiance: Great Britain; United Kingdom
- Branch: British Army
- Service years: 1778–1822
- Rank: Lieutenant-general
- Commands: Madras Army; Ireland
- Conflicts: Second Anglo-Mysore War; Third Anglo-Mysore War; Fourth Anglo-Mysore War; French Revolutionary Wars; British invasions of the River Plate; Battle of Cardal
- Awards: Knight Grand Cross of the Order of the Bath

Lieutenant-General Sir Samuel Auchmuty GCB PC (Ire) (22 June 1758 – 11 August 1822) was a British Army officer who served in a number of military campaigns in India, Africa and South America during the Napoleonic era.

== Early life, family and education ==
Auchmuty was born in New York City in 1758, and educated at King's College, the progenitor of today's Columbia University, where he graduated in 1775. Auchmuty's grandfather, Robert Auchmuty (d. 1750), was descended from a family settled in Fife, Scotland, in the 14th century. Robert Auchmuty's father (Samuel's great grandfather) had moved to Ireland in 1699, and Robert emigrated to America and settled in Boston, where he practised law with success. Robert Auchmuty was appointed to the court of admiralty in 1703, which office he resigned shortly afterward; but he was reappointed in 1733. He was in England in 1741 as agent for the colony, and in that year published in London a pamphlet entitled The Importance of Cape Breton to the British Nation, and a Plan for Taking the Place.

Auchmuty's father, also named Samuel, was a clergyman. He graduated from Harvard in 1742, studied theology in England, and was appointed assistant minister of Trinity Church in New York. In 1764 he became rector, and had charge of all the churches in the city. He continued to read prayers for the king during the American Revolutionary War, until Lord Stirling, in command at New York, compelled him to desist; whereupon he locked the churches and withdrew to New Jersey, ordering that no services should be held until the prayers could be read without abridgment. When the British captured New York he passed the American lines amid great hardships. He found his church and parsonage burned and the church records destroyed. The exposure that he underwent in order to evade the American sentries caused his death.

His uncle, son of Auchmuty's grandfather and also named Robert (born in Boston; died December 1788 in Marylebone, London), was an eloquent and successful advocate in Boston. He was one of the counsel for the soldiers engaged in the Boston Massacre, and became a judge of admiralty in 1769; but in 1776, being a zealous Loyalist, he withdrew to England. His and Thomas Hutchinson's letters from Boston to England, which were sent back to the colonies by Benjamin Franklin in 1773, caused great excitement.

Auchmuty's sister Jane was the mother of Colonel William Tylden of the Royal Engineers.

Auchmuty married Elizabeth Domvile Savage, only daughter of Francis Savage. Their second son was General Samuel Benjamin Auchmuty,

== Military career ==
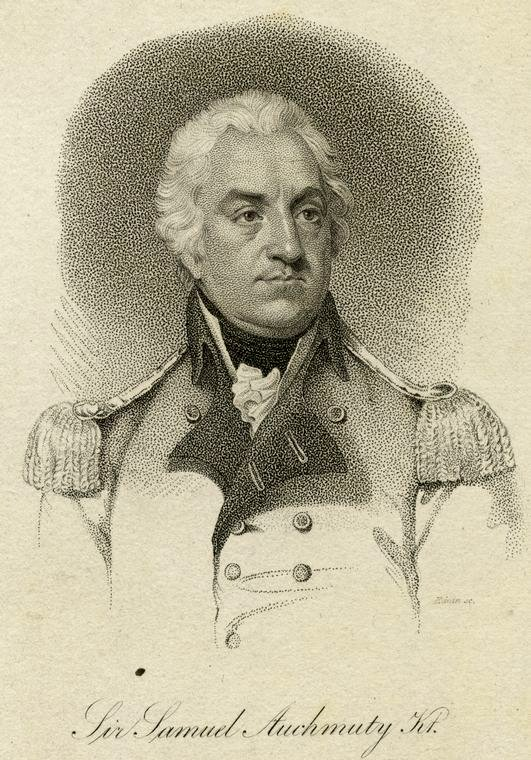
1923 portrait of Auchmuty

A loyalist, during the American War of Independence he was given an ensigncy in the loyal army in 1777, and in 1778 a lieutenancy in the 45th Foot, without purchase. When his regiment returned to England after the war, having neither private means nor influence, he exchanged into the 52nd (Oxfordshire) Regiment of Foot, in order to proceed to India.

He took part in the last war against Hyder Ali; he was given a staff appointment by Lord Cornwallis in 1790, served in the operations against Tippoo Sahib, and continued in various staff appointments up to 1797, when he returned to England a brevet lieutenant-colonel.

In 1800 he was made lieutenant-colonel and brevet colonel; and in the following year, as Adjutant-general to Sir David Baird in Egypt, took a distinguished share in the march across the desert and the Capture of Alexandria. On his return to England in 1803 he was knighted, and three years later he went out to the Río de la Plata as a brigadier-general. Auchmuty was one of the few officers who came out of the disastrous British invasions of the River Plate of 1806-7 with enhanced reputation. While General John Whitelocke, the commander, was cashiered, Auchmuty was at once re-employed and promoted to major-general. In 1810 he was appointed to command the Madras Army.

In the following year he commanded the expedition organized for the conquest of Java, which the governor-general, Lord Minto, himself accompanied. The storming of the strongly fortified position of Meester Cornelis (28 August 1811), stubbornly defended by a Dutch garrison under General Janssens, practically achieved conquest of the island, and after the action of Samarang (8 September 1811) Janssens surrendered. Auchmuty received the thanks of Parliament and was appointed KCB and, on his return home, was promoted to the rank of lieutenant-general. In 1822 he became Commander-in-Chief, Ireland, and a member of the Irish privy council. He died suddenly in August 1822.

== Notes ==
Military offices
Preceded by Hay McDowall	C-in-C, Madras Army; 1810–1813	Succeeded by Sir John Abercromby
Preceded by Sir David Baird	Commander-in-Chief, Ireland; 1822	Succeeded by The Viscount Combermere
Preceded by James Henry Craig	Colonel of the 78th (Highlanders) Regiment of Foot; 1812–1822	Succeeded by Sir Edward Barnes
