= Samuel Auchmuty (clergyman) =

American minister

The Reverend Samuel Auchmuty
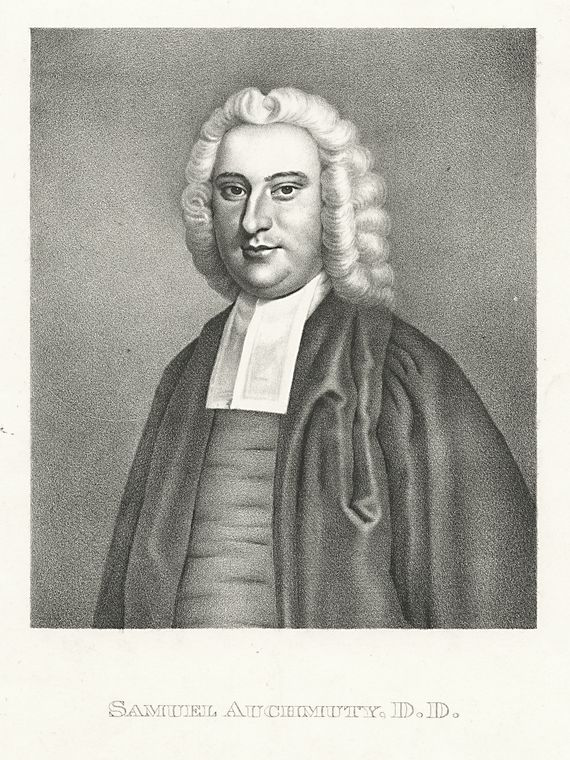
- Born: January 26, 1722; Boston, Province of Massachusetts Bay
- Died: March 4, 1777 (aged 55); New York City, U.S.
- Resting place: St. Paul's Chapel, New York City, U.S.
- Education: Harvard College
- Relatives: Samuel Auchmuty (son)

Reverend Samuel Auchmuty (January 26, 1722 – March 4, 1777) was an American Anglican minister who served as the third rector of Trinity Church in New York City from 1764 until his death thirteen years later.

== Early life ==
Auchmuty was born in 1722 in Boston, Province of Massachusetts Bay, to Robert Auchmuty Sr., a judge, and Mary Julianna. He was youngest of their three known children, following Robert Jr. and Isabella.

He graduated Harvard College in 1742.

== Career ==
Auchmuty was ordained a deacon by the Bishop of London on March 8, 1747, and a priest seven days later. The following year, he was installed as assistant minister to Reverend Henry Barclay at Trinity Church in New York City. He also became a catechist of Negroes for the Society for the Propagation of the Gospel.

In September 1764, a month after the death of Reverend Barclay, he became the third rector of Trinity Church.

A Loyalist, Auchmuty was forced to relocate to New Brunswick, New Jersey, in April 1776 after Patriots took control of New York City. He returned to Manhattan when the Redcoats regained authority. En route, he suffered from the cold weather, which contributed to his death the following year.

In the fall of 1776, after a fire destroyed large parts of Manhattan (including Trinity Church), Auchmuty addressed the congregation from the pulpit of St. Paul's Chapel. The handwritten sermon is in the possession of the New York Historical.

== Personal life ==
Auchmuty married Mary Nicholls, with whom he had four known children, including Samuel, a British Army officer, in 1758.

== Death ==
Auchmuty died in 1777, aged 55. He was interred beneath the chancel of St. Paul's Chapel.
