= Samuel Auchmuty (British Army officer, born 1780) =

British Army officer

General Sir Samuel Auchmuty GCB
- Born: 28 April 1780; Newry, County Down
- Died: 30 April 1868 (aged 88); Pau, Pyrénées-Atlantiques, France
- Military career
- Allegiance: Great Britain; United Kingdom
- Branch: British Army
- Service years: 1797–1868
- Rank: General
- Awards: Knight Grand Cross of the Order of the Bath

General Sir Samuel Benjamin Auchmuty GCB (28 April 1780 – 30 April 1868) was a British Army officer.

== Military career ==
He was the second son of Samuel Auchmuty and his wife, Elizabeth Domvile Savage, only daughter of Francis Savage. Auchmuty entered the British Army as ensign in 1797 and served first in the French Revolutionary Wars and subsequently in the Napoleonic Wars. He was lieutenant of the 68th Regiment of Foot in 1800 and was promoted to captain in 1805. A year later Auchmuty was transferred to the 70th Regiment of Foot and in 1807 to the 7th Regiment of Foot. In 1810, he was appointed deputy assistant adjutant-general and attached to the 6th Infantry Division. He became Aide-de-camp to Sir Galbraith Lowry Cole in July 1813 and was promoted to major in October of the same year. Auchmuty fought in the Battle of Orthez in February 1814 and in the Battle of Toulouse in April, for which he received the Army Gold Medal and was made a brevet lieutenant-colonel.

Auchmuty became colonel in 1831 and major-general 1841. He was transferred to the general staff in India in 1848, became colonel of the 65th Regiment of Foot in February 1851 was promoted to lieutenant-general in November. In 1855, Auchmuty was appointed colonel of his old regiment, the 7th foot, and following the death of Sir Robert John Harvey was promoted finally to general in 1860. He was awarded a Knight Commander of the Order of the Bath in 1857 and a Knight Grand Cross in 1861. In 1817, he married Mary Anne Buchanan. Auchmuty died, aged 88 at Pau, Pyrénées-Atlantiques.

== Arms ==
Coat of arms of Samuel Auchmuty
Notes Granted by John Bernard Burke, Ulster King of Arms, 20 February 1863. Crest On a wreath of the colours an arm embowed in armour Proper holding the lower part of a broken spear headways Azure. Escutcheon Argent the upper part of a broken spear bendways between two mullets of six points Azure pierced of the field. Motto Dum Spiro Spero

Military offices
Preceded by Thomas Grosvenor	Colonel of the 65th (2nd Yorkshire, North Riding) Regiment of Foot; 1851 – 1855	Succeeded by Henry Balneavis
Preceded by Sir George Brown	Colonel of the 7th (Royal Fusiliers) Regiment of Foot; 1855 – 1868	Succeeded by Sir Richard Airey
