= William Vesey =

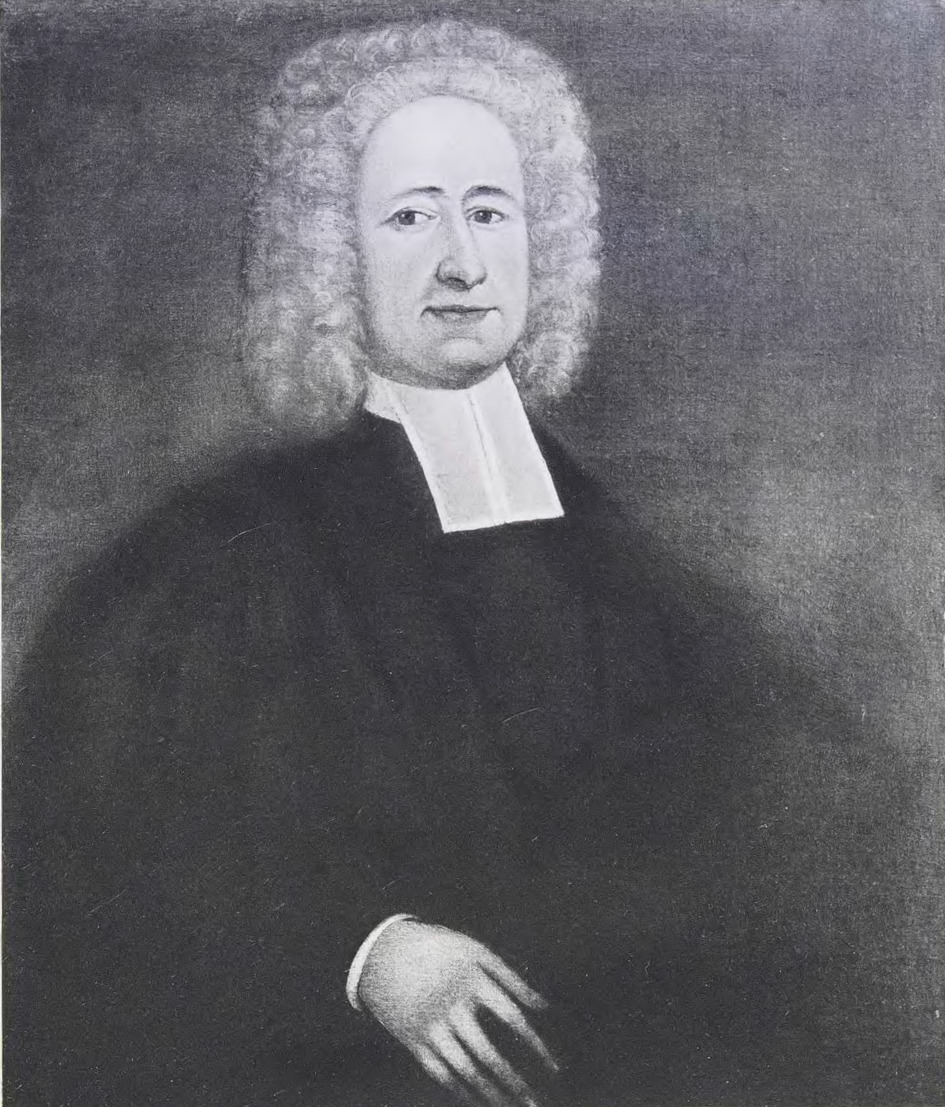
- Born: 10 October 1674; Braintree
- Died: 11 July 1746 (aged 71); New York City
- Education: University of Oxford, Harvard University
- Occupation: Clergyman, Minister

Rev. William Vesey (August 10, 1674 – July 11, 1746) was the first rector of Trinity Church in Manhattan.

== Early life and family ==
Vesey was born in Braintree, Massachusetts, in 1674 , the son of William and Mary (Saunders) Vesey. The Vesey/Veazie family was established in Braintree about 1643.

Though Vesey's immediate family outwardly conformed to the established Congregational church (where William was baptized), they were of a small group that held with the Church of England. At that early date, there was no church building, and no minister, and a small group of Anglicans held quiet services at his father's house. Nonetheless, his father was firm in declaring himself as a member of the Church of England. Vesey (the father) was elected to represent Braintree to the General Court of the province of Massachusetts Bay in 1702, but was expelled following a conviction for plowing on a day of thanksgiving set aside (by Puritans) for the escape of King William from assassination. In that trial, Vesey declared that "King James was his rightful Prince," not King William. His father was one of the organizers of Christ Church (Quincy, Massachusetts) in 1704, giving land for the site of an edifice in 1727.

Vesey, at the age of 15, entered Harvard College, and was graduated from there in 1693, awarded with an A.B. degree at the age of 19. Shortly after graduation, not being of an age to receive orders, Vesey began his preaching and reading as a layman on Long Island at Sag Harbor (6 months), and at Hempstead (2 years). He continued his theological studies under Rev. Samuel Myles, Rector of King's Chapel in Boston. While at Boston, he was called by the Church Wardens and Vestry of New York to officiate as minister. He hadn't yet been ordained, and went to England, where his received a Master of Arts degree at the University of Oxford, July 12, 1696. He was ordained as Priest in August, and returned to New York the same year.

He was married, March 1, 1698, to Mary Reede. Following his death, Mary became the wife of Judge Daniel Horsmanden of New York City.

== Ministry ==
Vesey was installed rector of Trinity parish upon the completion of its edifice, March 13, 1698. A protege of Increase Mather, he visited England for the relief of his church, 1714–15, returning as commissary to the Venerable Society for the Propagation of the Gospel by appointment of Bishop Compton of London, and by his industry the Church of England was firmly planted in the United States, twenty-two churches having been established by Vesey during his forty-eight years of rectorship.

== Legacy ==
His name is perpetuated in Vesey Street and Rector Street, Manhattan, and his portrait was placed in Trinity chapel. He died in New York City, July 11, 1746.
