= Trinity Church (Manhattan) =

Episcopal church in Manhattan, New York

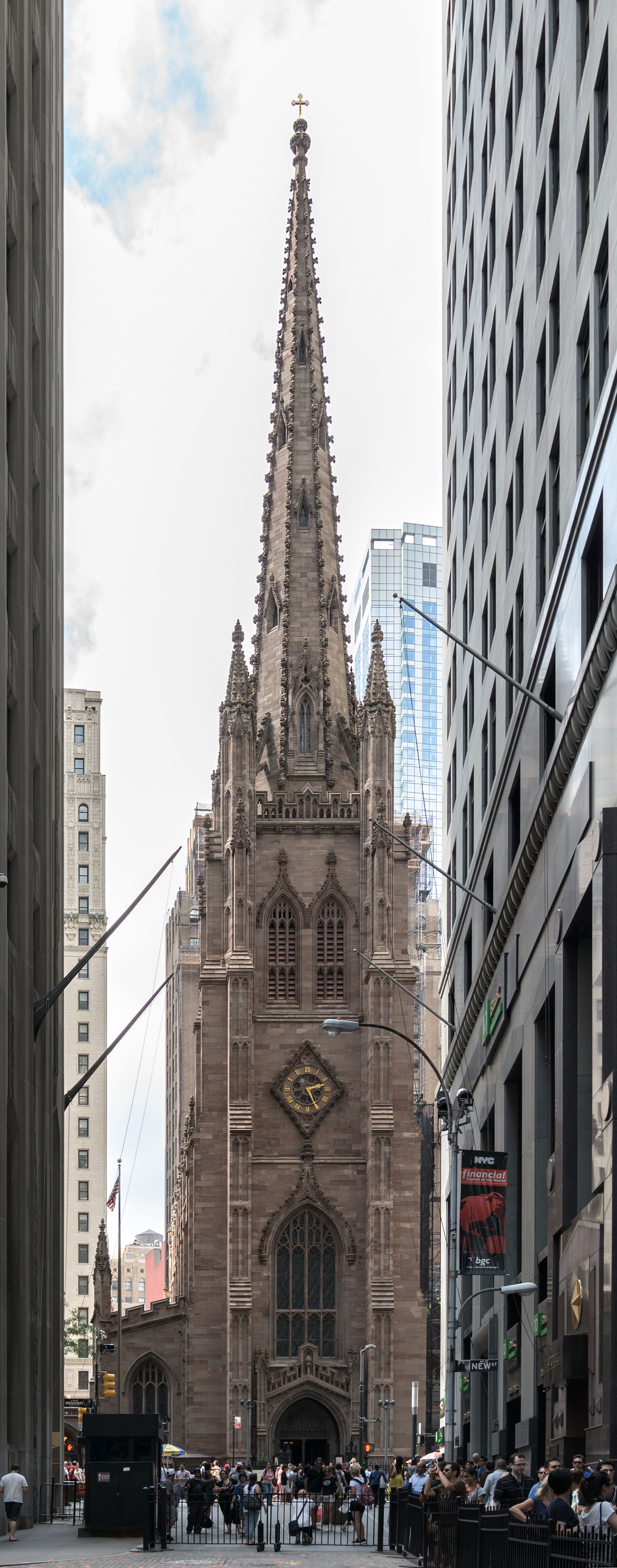
- Seen from Wall Street
- Trinity Church
- 40°42′29″N 74°00′44″W
- Location: 89 Broadway, Manhattan, New York
- Country: United States
- Denomination: Episcopal Church
- Churchmanship: High Church
- Website: trinitychurchnyc.org

History
- Status: Parish church
- Founded: May 6, 1697; 329 years ago
- Founder: William III of England
- Dedicated: May 1, 1846

Architecture
- Functional status: Active
- Architect(s): Richard Upjohn (church); Frederick Clarke Withers (renovations, altar, and rear addition)
- Style: Gothic Revival
- Years built: 1839–1846; 1876–1877
- Groundbreaking: June 3, 1841
- Completed: 1846

Specifications
- Capacity: 652

Administration
- Province: Atlantic
- Diocese: New York
- Deanery: Manhattan Lower

Clergy
- Rector: Phillip A. Jackson
- Vicar: Michael A. Bird
- Priest(s): Promise Atelon; Mark Bozzuti-Jones; Kristin Kaulbach Miles; Yein Kim; Alfred Loua; Jorge Ortiz; Matthew A. Welsch; Patrick Williams
- Trinity Church and Graveyard
- U.S. National Register of Historic Places
- U.S. National Historic Landmark
- U.S. Historic district – Contributing property
- New York State Register of Historic Places
- New York City Landmark
- Part of: Wall Street Historic District (ID07000063)
- NRHP reference No.: 76001252
- NYSRHP No.: 06101.001779
- NYCL No.: 0048

Significant dates
- Added to NRHP: December 8, 1976
- Designated NHL: December 8, 1976
- Designated CP: February 20, 2007
- Designated NYSRHP: June 23, 1980
- Designated NYCL: August 16, 1966

Trinity Church is a historic parish in the Episcopal Diocese of New York. The church is located at 89 Broadway opposite Wall Street, in the Financial District of Lower Manhattan in New York City. Known for its centuries of history, prominent location, distinguished architecture and bountiful endowment, Trinity's congregation is said to be "high church", its activities based on the traditions of the Episcopal Church and the worldwide Anglican Communion in missionary outreach, and fellowship. In addition to its main church, Trinity parish maintains two chapels: St. Paul's Chapel, also in Lower Manhattan, and the Chapel of St. Cornelius the Centurion on Governors Island. The Church of the Intercession, the Trinity Chapel Complex and many other of Manhattan's Episcopal congregations were once part of Trinity parish. Columbia University was founded on the church's grounds as King's College in 1754.

The building Trinity Church has occupied since 1846, designed by Richard Upjohn in the Gothic Revival style, is the third church constructed for the parish. Trinity's first church building was a single-story rectangular structure with tall steeple facing the Hudson River, which was constructed in 1698 and destroyed in the Great New York City Fire of 1776. After using St. Paul's Chapel, the parish's second building was built on Broadway at Wall Street and was consecrated in 1790. The third church was erected on the second building's site from 1839 to 1846 and was the tallest building in the United States until 1869, as well as the tallest in New York City until 1890. In 1876–1877 a reredos and altar were erected in memory of William Backhouse Astor Sr., to the designs of architect Frederick Clarke Withers, who extended the rear.

The church is adjacent to the Trinity Churchyard, one of three burial grounds used by the parish; Alexander Hamilton is buried there. In addition to its church and two chapels, Trinity manages real estate properties with a combined worth of over $6 billion as of 2019. Trinity's main church building is a National Historic Landmark as well as a New York City designated landmark. It is also a contributing property to the Wall Street Historic District, a NRHP district created in 2007.

== History ==
In 1696, Governor Benjamin Fletcher approved the purchase of land in Lower Manhattan by the Church of England community for construction of a new church. The parish received its charter from King William III on May 6, 1697. Its land grant specified an annual rent of 60 bushels of wheat. The first rector was William Vesey (for whom nearby Vesey Street is named), a protégé of Increase Mather, who served for 49 years until his death in 1746.

=== First Trinity Church ===
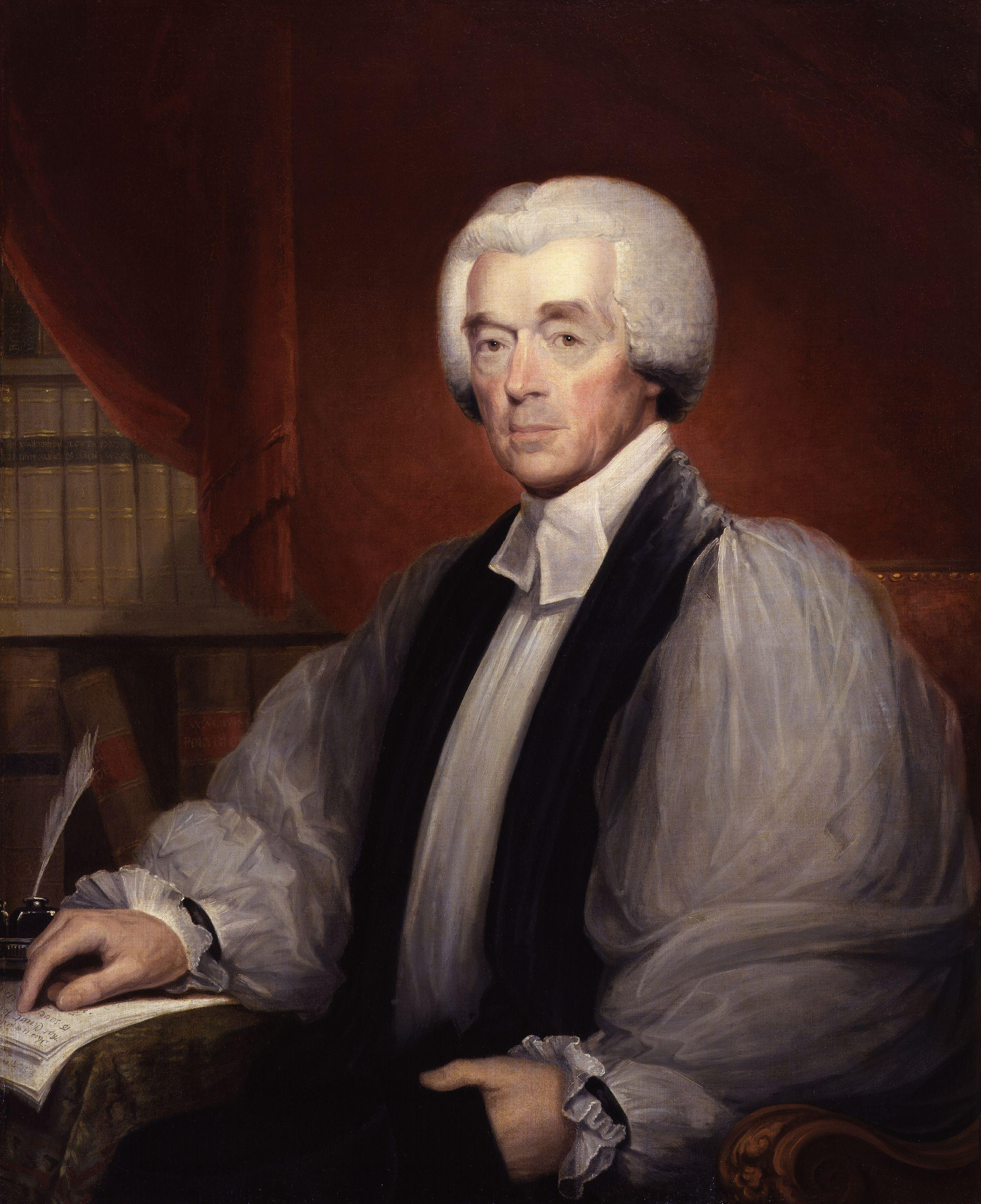
Loyalist Charles Inglis, Rector of Trinity Church (1765–1783)

The first Trinity Church building, a modest rectangular structure with a gambrel roof and small porch, was constructed in 1698, on Wall Street, facing the Hudson River. The land on which it was built was formerly a formal garden and then a burial ground. It was built because in 1696, members of the Church of England (Anglicans) protested to obtain a "charter granting the church legal status" in New York City. According to historical records, Captain William Kidd lent the runner and tackle from his ship for hoisting the stones.

Anne, Queen of England, increased the parish's land holdings to 215 acres (870,000 m^{2}) in 1705. Later, in 1709, William Huddleston founded Trinity School as the Charity School of the church, and classes were originally held in the steeple of the church. In 1754, King's College (now Columbia University) was chartered by King George II of Great Britain, and instruction began with eight students in a school building near the church.

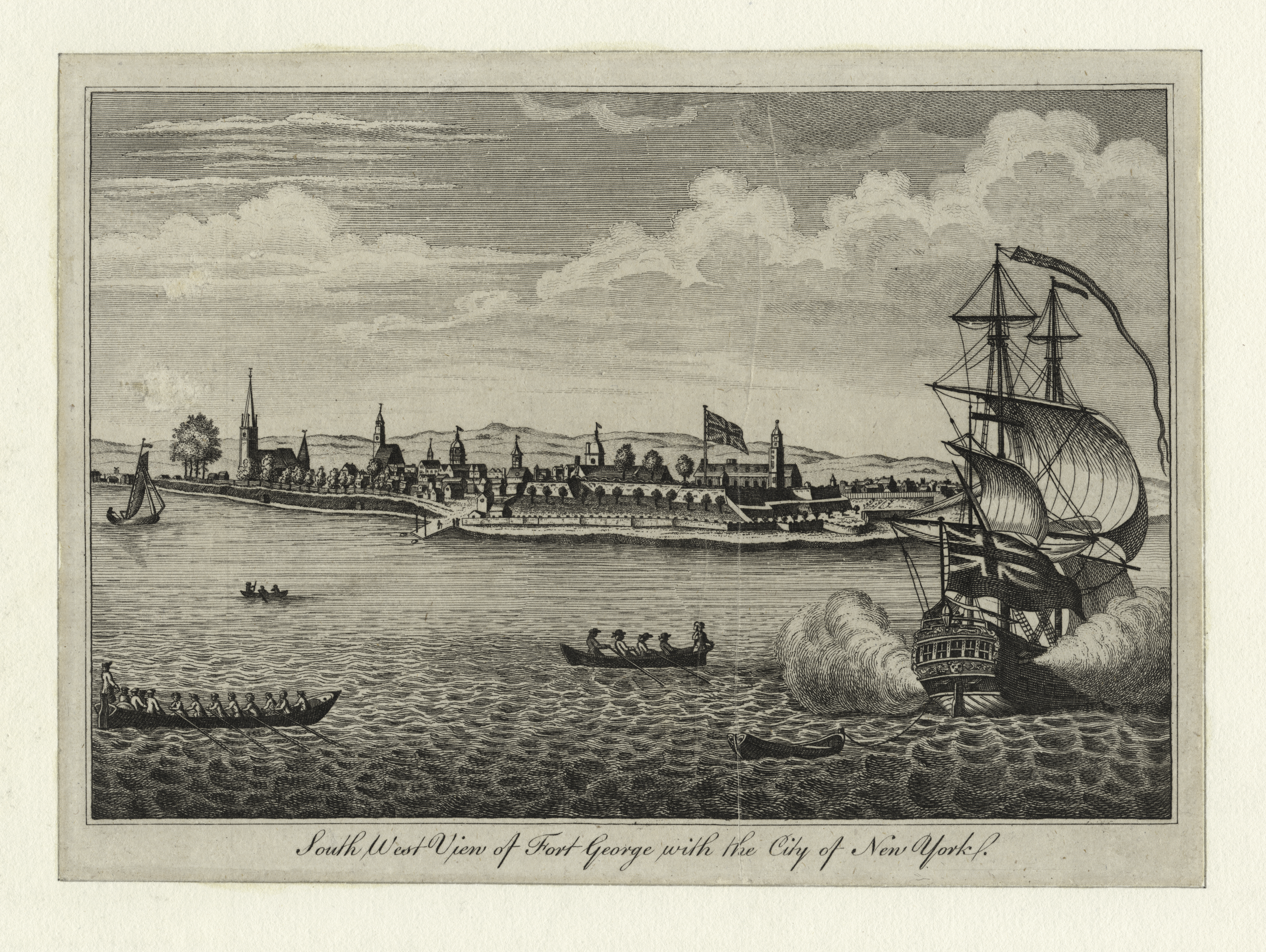
South West view of Fort George (New York City) showing at far left Trinity Church (c. 1770s)

During the American Revolutionary War the city became the British military and political base of operations in North America, following the departure of General George Washington and the Continental Army shortly after Battle of Long Island and subsequent local defeats. Under British occupation clergy were required to be Loyalists, while the parishioners included some members of the revolutionary New York Provincial Congress, as well as the First and Second Continental Congresses.

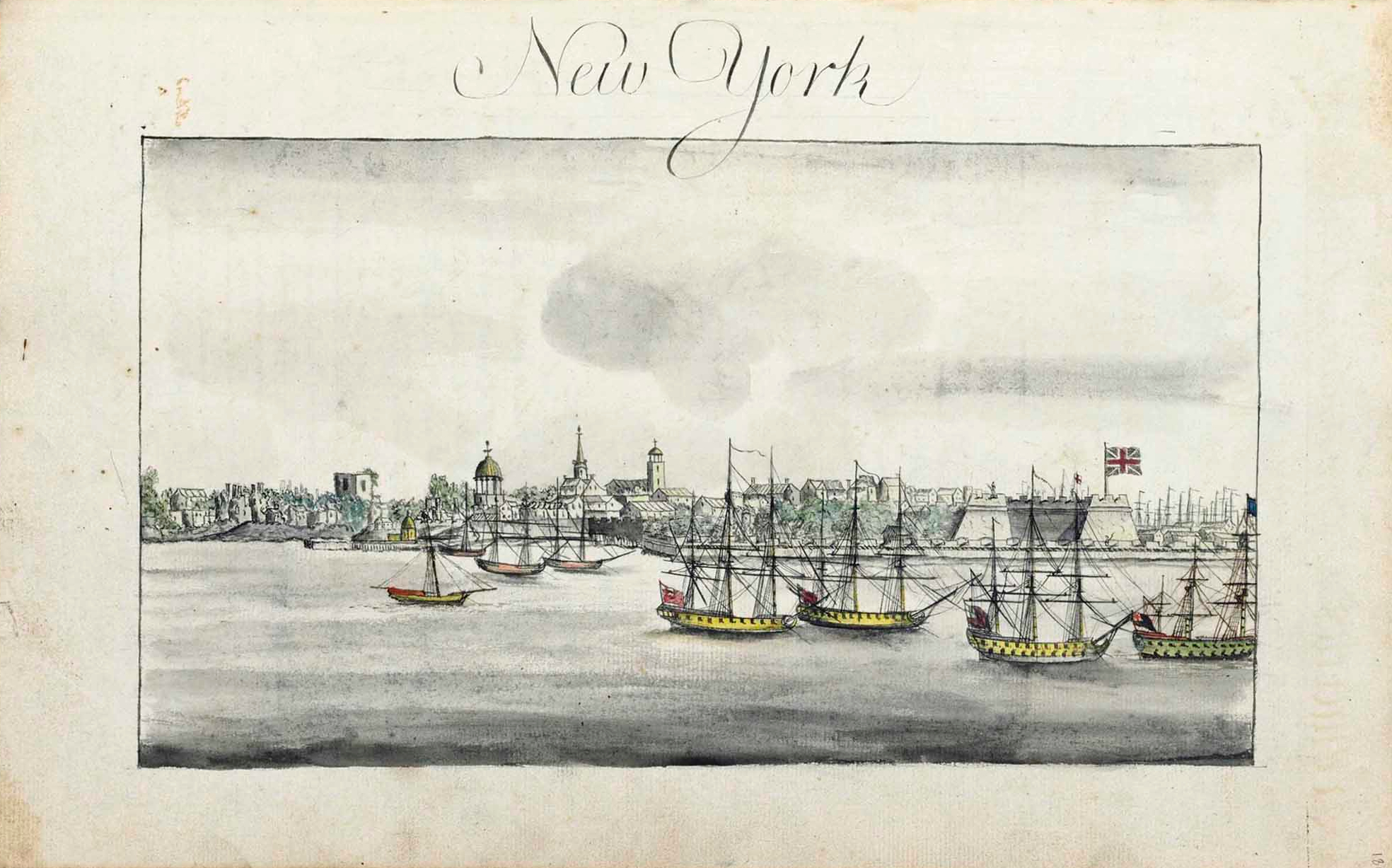
September 1776 view of New York City showing at center left the spire of Trinity Church

The church was destroyed in the Great New York City Fire of 1776, which started in the Fighting Cocks Tavern, destroying between 400 and 500 buildings and houses, and leaving thousands of New Yorkers homeless. Six days later, most of the city's volunteer firemen followed General Washington north. Rev. Charles Inglis served throughout the war and then fled to Nova Scotia at the war's end.

The Rev. Samuel Provoost was appointed Rector of Trinity (1784–1800) in 1784, and the New York State Legislature ratified the charter of Trinity Church, deleting the provision that asserted its loyalty to the King of England. Whig patriots were appointed as vestrymen. In 1787, Provoost was consecrated as the first Bishop of the newly formed Diocese of New York. Following his 1789 inauguration at Federal Hall, George Washington attended a service of thanksgiving, presided over by Bishop Provoost, at St. Paul's Chapel, a chapel of the Parish of Trinity Church. He continued to attend services there until the second Trinity Church was finished in 1790. St. Paul's Chapel is currently part of the Parish of Trinity Church and is the oldest public building in continuous use in New York City.

=== Second Trinity Church ===
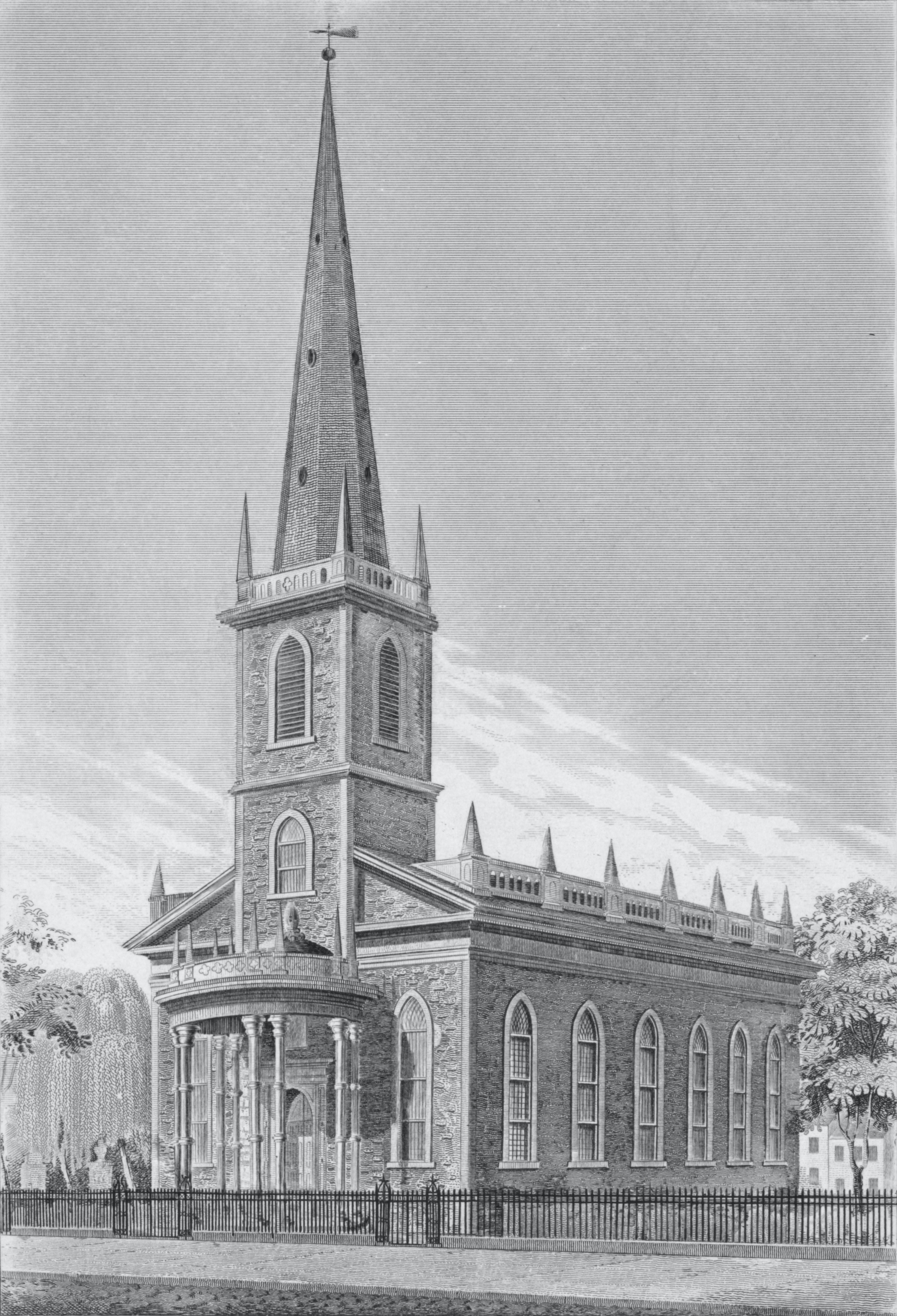
Trinity Church 1788–1839 in 1827

Construction on the second Trinity Church building began in 1788; it was consecrated in 1790. St. Paul's Chapel was used while the second Trinity Church was being built.

The second Trinity Church was built facing Wall Street; it was 200 feet tall, and longer and wider than its predecessor. Building a bigger church was beneficial because the population of New York City was expanding. The church was torn down after being weakened by severe snows during the winter of 1838–39.

The second Trinity Church was politically significant because President Washington and members of his government often worshiped there. Additional notable parishioners included John Jay and Alexander Hamilton.

Trinity also purchased land in what was then considered the suburbs at Hamilton Square - now 71st street on the Upper East Side - and constructed St. James' Episcopal Church as a summer parish. Completed in 1810, St James 1885 church still stands today.

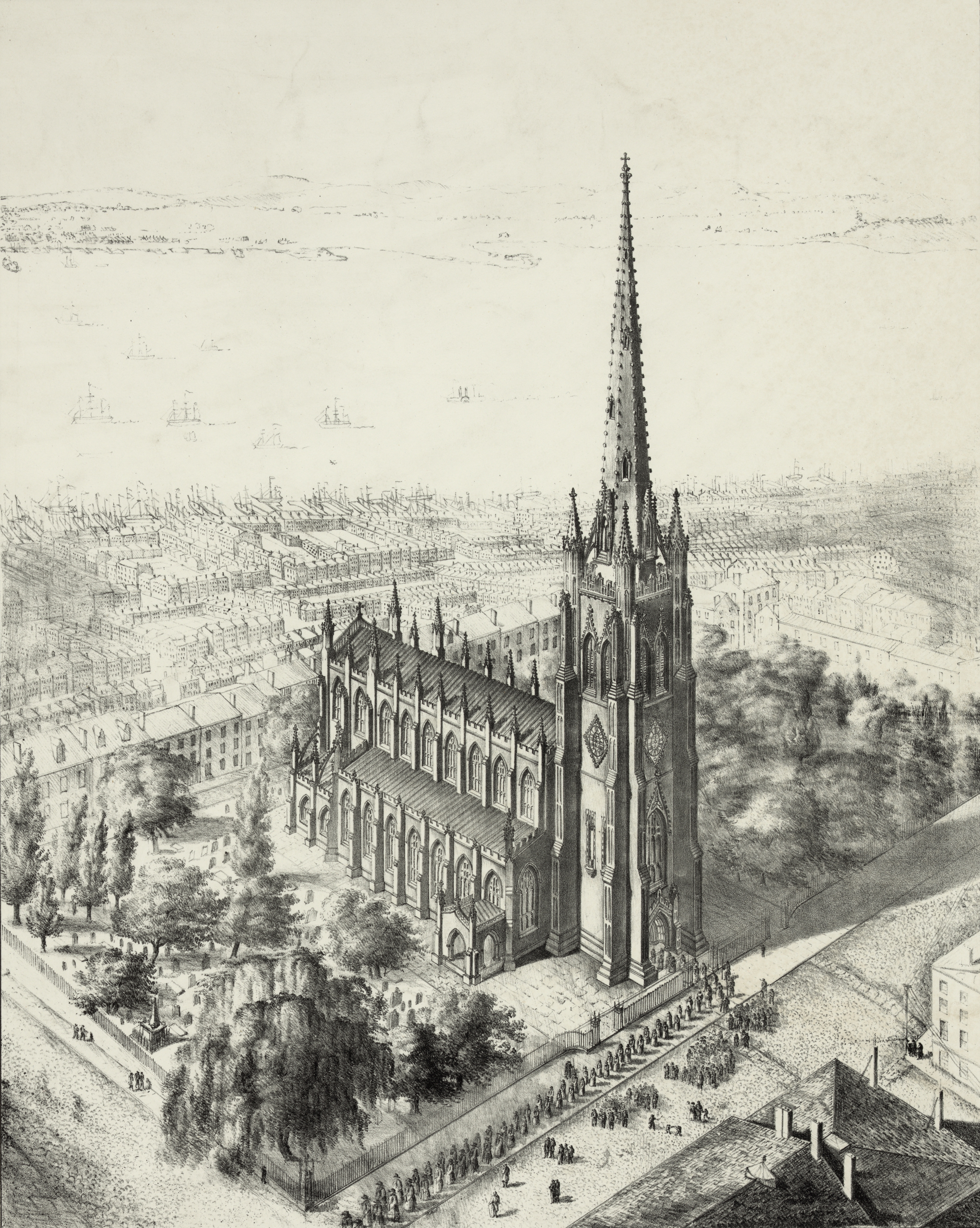
Bird's-eye view of Trinity Church, 1846

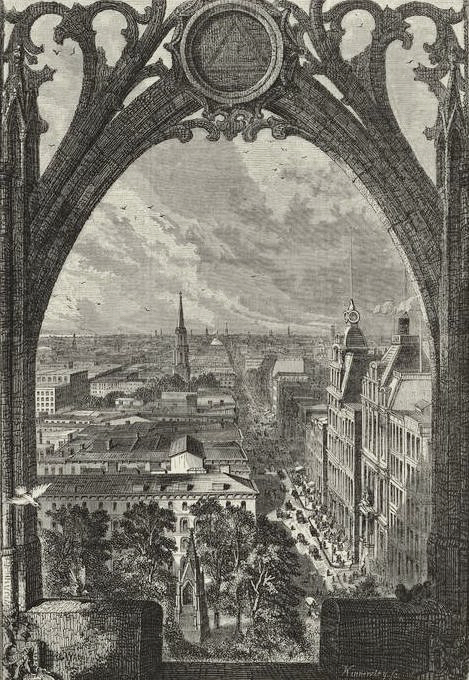
View from church steeple, 1872

Trinity Church c. 1900

=== Third Trinity Church ===
The third and current Trinity Church began construction in 1839 and was finished in 1846. When the Episcopal Bishop of New York consecrated Trinity Church on Ascension Day (May 1) 1846, its soaring Gothic Revival spire, surmounted by a gilded cross, dominated the skyline of lower Manhattan. Trinity was a welcoming beacon for ships sailing into New York Harbor.

In 1843, Trinity Church's expanding parish was divided due to the burgeoning cityscape and to better serve the needs of its parishioners. The newly formed parish would build Grace Church, to the north on Broadway at 10th Street, while the original parish would re-build Trinity Church, the structure that stands today. Both Grace and Trinity Churches were completed and consecrated in 1846.

Trinity Church held the title of tallest building in the United States until 1869, when it was surpassed by St. Michael's Church, Old Town, Chicago. Trinity continued to be the tallest in New York City, with its 281-foot (86 m) spire and cross, until it was surpassed in 1890 by the New York World Building.

In 1876–1877, a reredos and altar were erected in memory of William Backhouse Astor, Sr., to the designs of architect Frederick Clarke Withers. As the chancel was rearranged, the vestry voted for a one-story rear extension with rooms for the clergy, choir, and a mortuary chapel. The altarpiece was restored as part of the church's 21st-century renovation.

During the Hard Hat Riot of May 8, 1970, the church was used as a field hospital by anti-war protesters who came under attack by counterdemonstrating construction workers and their allies. The pro-war crowd attempted an assault on the church, during which they tore down the Red Cross flag and attempted to do the same to the Episcopal standard.

On July 10, 1976, Queen Elizabeth II and Prince Philip, Duke of Edinburgh, visited Trinity Church. Vestrymen presented the Queen with a symbolic "back rent" of 279 peppercorns.

Inspiration, Please!, a game show aired on Odyssey Network (now Hallmark Channel), taped at Trinity Church in 1995.

==== 21st-century events ====
Following the September 11 attacks, Trinity organized respite services at St. Paul's Chapel for first responders and volunteers at Ground Zero, providing meals, medical care, spiritual services, and a place of rest. Memorial items such as cards, banners, clothing, photos, jewelry, stuffed animals, and more were left at St. Paul's in the aftermath of the attacks to commemorate those who died. Some of these materials and some of the chapel pews were donated to the National September 11 Memorial and Museum.

Falling wreckage knocked over a giant sycamore tree that had stood for nearly a century in the churchyard of St. Paul's. Sculptor Steve Tobin used its roots as the base for a bronze sculpture titled Trinity Root, which stood in front of Trinity Church at the corner of Wall Street and Broadway until December 2015, when it was moved by the church to its conference center in Connecticut. The move was controversial as it damaged the sculpture, which was later repaired, and the artist objected to its relocation.

Trinity is located near Zuccotti Park, the location of the Occupy Wall Street protests. It offered both moral and practical support to the demonstrators but balked when protesters demanded an encampment on church-owned land called LentSpace, adjoining Juan Pablo Duarte Square in the neighborhood of Hudson Square. The church hierarchy were criticized by others within the Anglican movement, most notably Archbishop Desmond Tutu. On December 17, 2011, occupiers and a few clergy attempted to occupy LentSpace, which is surrounded by a chain-link fence. After demonstrating in Duarte Park and marching on the streets surrounding the park, occupiers climbed over and under the fence. Police responded by arresting about 50 demonstrators, including at least three Episcopal clergymen and a Roman Catholic nun.

== Architecture ==
The third and present Trinity Church building was built in 1846 and designed by architect Richard Upjohn in the Gothic Revival style. In 1976, the United States Department of the Interior designated Trinity Church a National Historic Landmark because of its architectural significance and its place within the history of New York City.

In 2018, the church began a comprehensive renovation to make the building more accessible and comfortable for worshippers, and to restore historic elements like stained glass windows, clerestory windows, and interior walls. The renovation, approved by the New York City Landmarks Preservation Commission in January 2018, was designed by MBB Architects.

According to Traditional Building magazine, the building "had been added to and altered through the decades in ways that compromised the original architecture, actions that prompted a new master plan and an enormous six-year renovation, restoration, and rejuvenation led by [...] MBB Architects that brings the edifice back to its original glory and transforms it for 21st-century worship." Furthermore, "The building, which had suffered from deferred maintenance for decades, was systematically pieced back together with restored architecture and ornament, insulated walls and ceilings, new clerestory windows, a handicap accessible chancel with a modified altar and altarpiece, a new vestry room, reimagined sacristy and choir rooms, three new organs, new interior and exterior lighting, and concealed audio-visual equipment for the broadcast of services and concerts." This restoration effort was recognized in 2022 with a Lucy G. Moses Preservation Award from the New York Landmarks Conservancy. The award program said, "These results have enhanced the worship experience and made the church more welcoming while improving the landmark's structure, accessibility, and resilience."

=== Bells ===
The tower of Trinity Church currently contains 23 bells, the heaviest of which weighs 27 U.S. hundredweight (2,700 pounds [1,200 kg]).

Eight of these bells were cast for the tower of the second church building and were hung for ringing in the English change ringing style. Three more bells were added later. In 1946 these bells were adapted for swing chiming and sounded by electric motors.

A project to install a new ring of 12 additional change ringing bells was initially proposed in 2001 but put on hold in the aftermath of the September attacks, which took place three blocks north of the church. This project came to fruition in 2006, thanks to funding from the Dill Faulkes Educational Trust. These new bells form the first ring of 12 change-ringing bells ever installed in a church in the United States. The installation work was carried out by Taylors, Eayre and Smith of Loughborough, England, in September 2006.

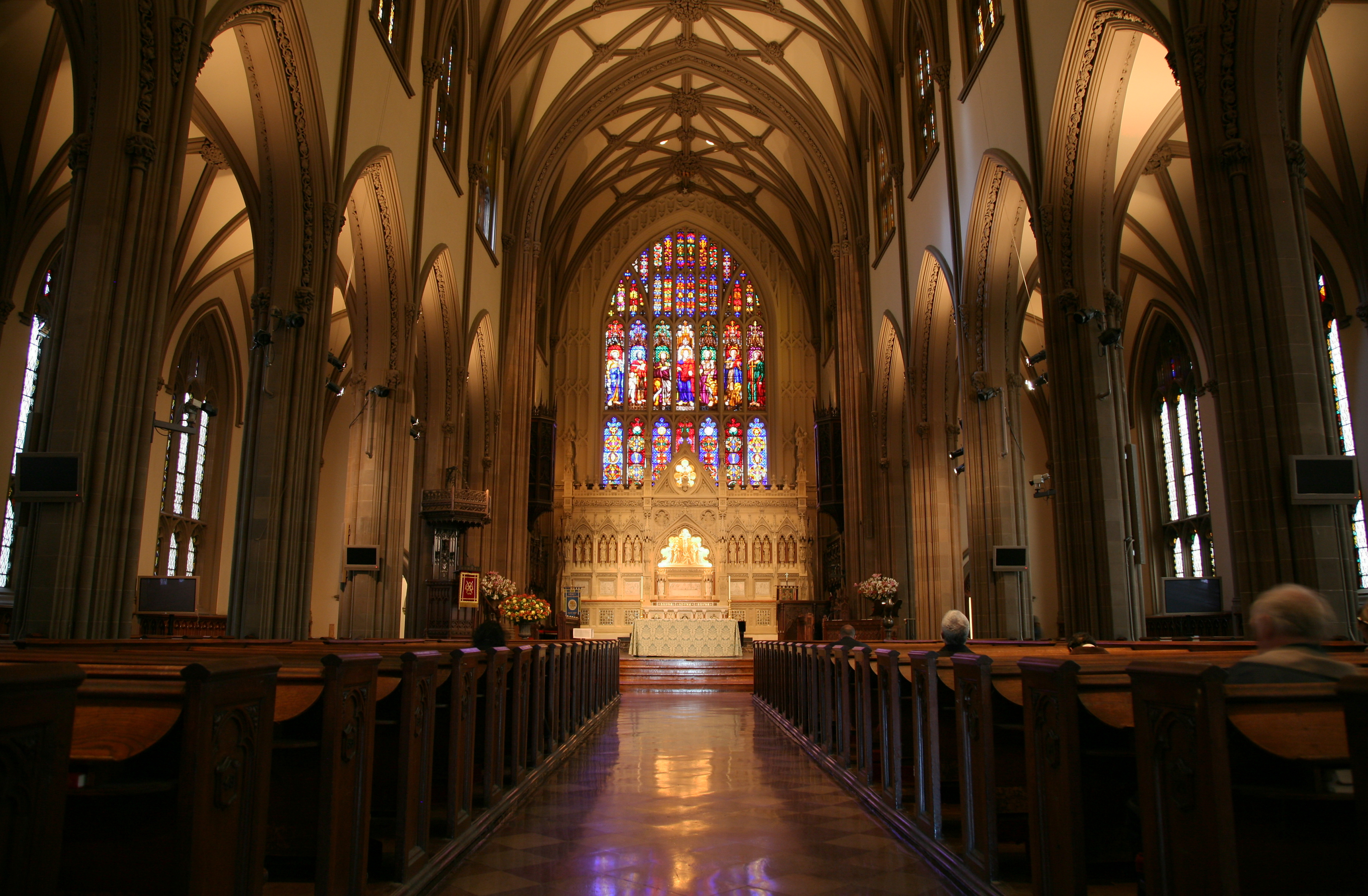
Interior of Trinity Church

In late 2006, the ringing of the bells for bell practice and tuning caused much concern to local residents, some of whose windows and residences are less than 100 feet (30 m) at eye level from the bell tower. The church then built a plywood deck right over the bells and placed shutters on the inside of the bell chamber's lancet windows. With the shutters and the plywood deck closed, the sound of the bells outside the tower is minimal. The shutters, and hatches in the plywood deck, are opened for public ringing.

Public ringing takes place before and after 11:15 a.m. Sunday service and on special occasions, such as 9/11 commemorations, weddings, and ticker-tape parades. Details of the individual bells can be found at "Dove's Guide for Church Bellringers".

=== Doors ===
Trinity Church has three sets of impressive bronze doors, donated by William Waldorf Astor, 1st Viscount Astor in memory of his father, John Jacob Astor III. Conceived by Richard Morris Hunt, they date from 1893 and were produced by Karl Bitter (east door), J. Massey Rhind (south door), and Charles Henry Niehaus (north door). The north and east doors each consists of six panels from Church history or the Bible, and the south door depicts the history of New York in its six panels.

=== Art ===
In 2015 Mark Francisco Bozzuti-Jones, a priest at Trinity Church, commissioned Mark Dukes to create the icon Our Lady of Ferguson. In 2022, the church received and installed a new stained-glass window above the main entrance on Broadway. Created by the British stained-glass artist Thomas Denny, the window illustrates both "The Parable of the Talents" and "The Judgment of the Nations" from the gospel according to Matthew.

== Burial grounds ==
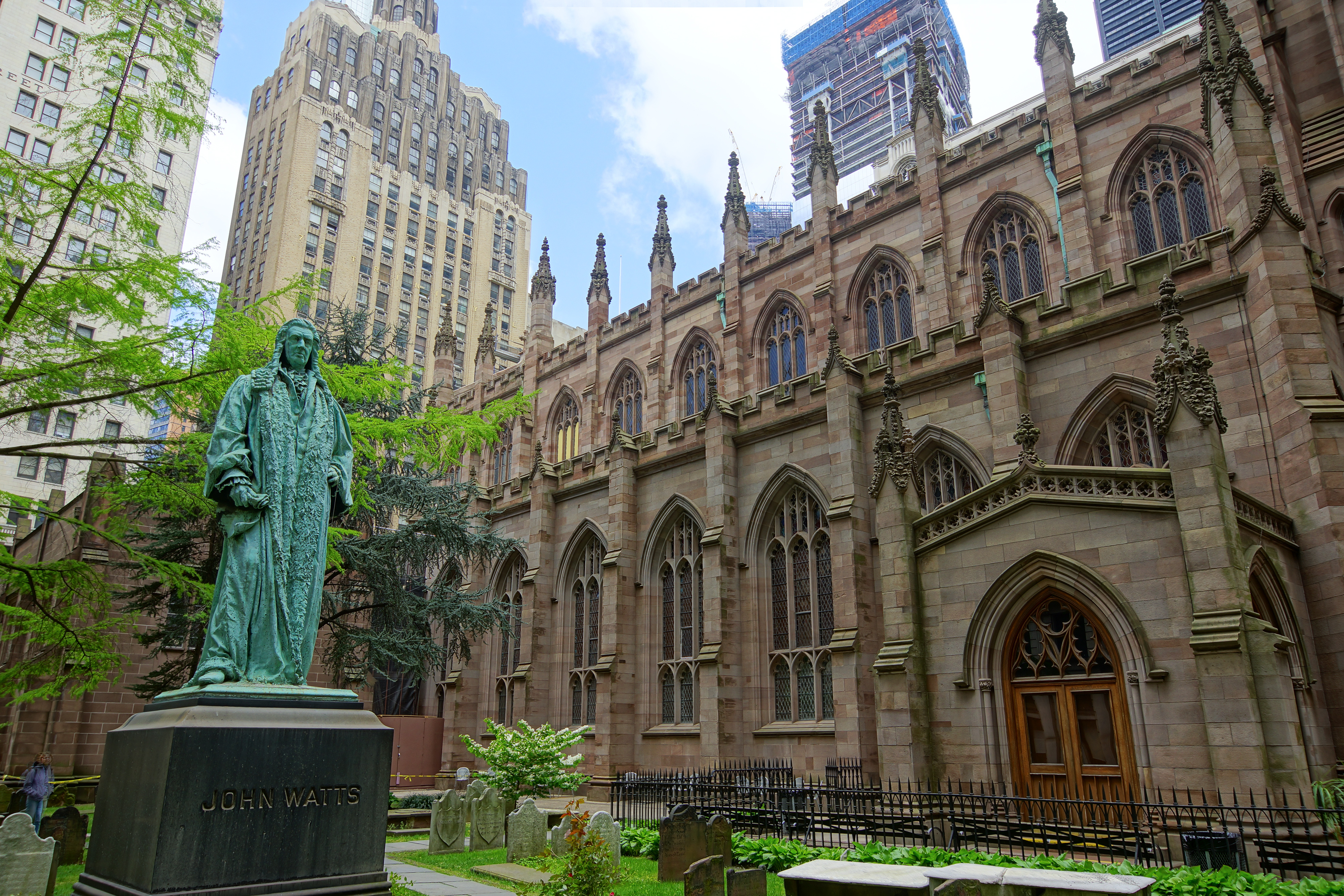
Statue of John Watts in the Trinity Churchyard

There are three burial grounds closely associated with Trinity Church:

1. Trinity Churchyard, surrounding the church at Wall Street and Broadway, is where Alexander Hamilton, Elizabeth Schuyler Hamilton, Angelica Schuyler Church, Philip Hamilton, William Bradford, Franklin Wharton, Robert Fulton, Captain James Lawrence, William Alexander, Lord Stirling, Francis Lewis, Albert Gallatin, Horatio Gates, and Hercules Mulligan are buried.
2. Trinity Church Cemetery and Mausoleum on Riverside Drive at 155th Street, formerly the location of John James Audubon's estate, is where Audubon, Alfred Tennyson Dickens, John Jacob Astor, Clement Clarke Moore, and Ed Koch are buried. It is the only remaining active cemetery in the borough of Manhattan.
3. The Churchyard of St. Paul's Chapel is where memorials to the United Irishmen Addis Emmet and Dr. William MacNeven are located.

== Services ==
Trinity Church, as an Episcopal parish in the Anglican Communion, offers a full schedule of Daily Prayer and Eucharist services throughout the week, based on the Book of Common Prayer. It is also available for special occasions, such as weddings and baptisms. In addition to daily worship, Trinity Church provides Christian fellowship and outreach to the community. Sisters of the Society of Saint Margaret are part of the pastoral care team at Trinity.

Since 1993, Trinity Church has hosted the graduation ceremonies of the High School of Economics and Finance. The school is located on Trinity Place, a few blocks away from the church.

== Rectors of Trinity Church ==
Rector	Image	Start date	End date
William Vesey		1697	1746
Henry Barclay		1746	1764
Samuel Auchmuty		1764	1777
Charles Inglis		1777	1783
Samuel Provoost		1784	1800
Benjamin Moore		1800	1816
John Henry Hobart		1816	1830
William Berrian		1830	1862
Morgan Dix		1862	1908
William Thomas Manning		1908	1921
Caleb Rochford Stetson		1921	1932
Frederic Sydney Fleming		1932	1951
John Heuss		1952	1966
John Vernon Butler, Jr.		1966	1972
Robert Parks		1972	1987
Daniel Paul Matthews		1987	2004
James H. Cooper		2004	2015
William Lupfer		2015	2020
Phillip A. Jackson		2020	present

== Music and arts ==
Trinity Church has a rich music program. Edward Morris Bowman was organist at the church in 1866-1867. Concerts at One has been providing live professional classical and contemporary music for the Wall Street community since 1969, and the church has several organized choirs, featured Sunday mornings on WQXR 105.9 FM in New York City. Trinity presents world-class music programs both in New York City and around the world via high definition video streaming.

The mainstay of Trinity's music program is The Choir of Trinity Wall Street, a professional ensemble that leads liturgical music at Trinity Church and St. Paul's Chapel, presents new-music concerts in New York City, produces recordings, and performs in international tours. The Choir is often joined by the Trinity Baroque Orchestra, Trinity's ensemble of period instrumentalists, and NOVUS NY, Trinity's contemporary music orchestra.

Trinity is also home to a Youth Chorus, Youth Orchestra, Family Choir, Downtown Voices, change bell ringers, and a wide variety of arts programming through Congregational Arts. Visiting choirs from around the world perform at Trinity weekly.

== Property holdings ==
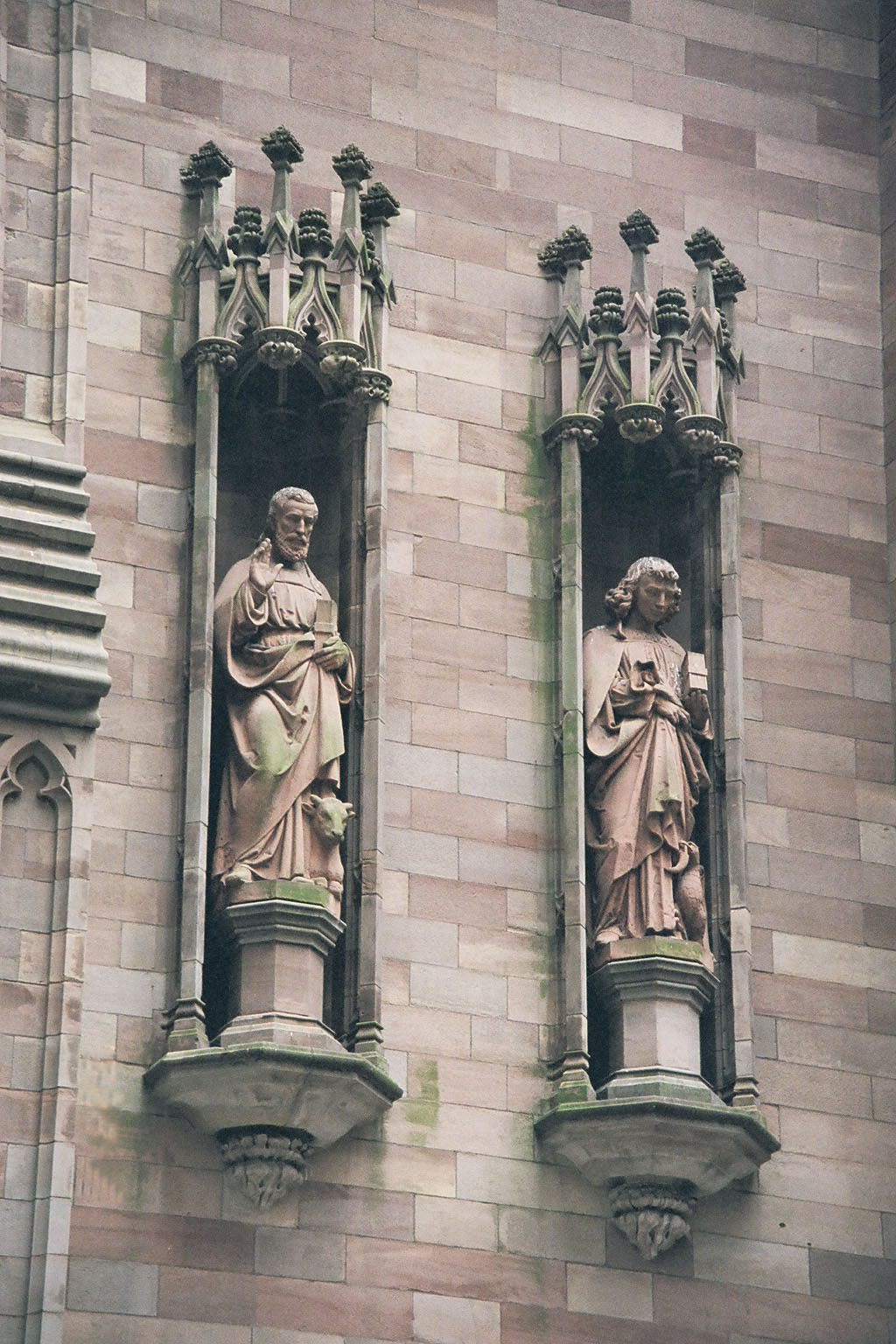
Close-up of statues of Trinity Church

Beginning in the 1780s, the church's claim on 62 acres of Queen Anne's 1705 grant was contested in the courts by descendants of a 17th-century Dutchwoman, Anneke Jans Bogardus, who, it was claimed, held original title to that property. The basis of the lawsuits was that only five of Bogardus' six heirs had conveyed the land to the English crown in 1671. Numerous times over the course of six decades, the claimants asserted themselves in court, losing each time. The attempt was even revived in the 20th century. In 1959, the Internal Revenue Service sued over the compensation of the church's property manager, but the church prevailed in Stanton v. United States.

Disclosure resulting from a lawsuit filed by a parishioner revealed total assets of about $2 billion as of 2011. Although Trinity Church has sold off much of the land that was part of the royal grant from Queen Anne, it is still one of the largest landowners in New York City with 14 acres of Manhattan real estate including 5.5 million square feet (510,000 m^{2}) of commercial space in Hudson Square. The parish's annual revenue from its real estate holdings was $158 million in 2011 with net income of $38 million, making it perhaps one of the richest individual parishes in the world. As of 2019, Trinity's investment portfolio was worth over $6 billion. At the end of 2018, the church's total equity was $8.3 billion, and it had $0.6 million in liabilities.

The institution also owns the Trinity Court Building property, where it formerly housed its offices and preschool. That building was demolished in 2015, and a replacement at 76 Trinity Place was completed in 2020. The church was connected to 76 Trinity Place by a footbridge.

Trinity Church owned many tenement-houses in New York City during the late 19th and early 20th centuries.

== See also ==
- List of Anglican churches
- List of National Historic Landmarks in New York City
- List of New York City Designated Landmarks in Manhattan below 14th Street
- National Register of Historic Places listings in Manhattan below 14th Street
