= Albert Capsouto Park =

Public park in Manhattan, New York

Coordinates: 40.722088°N 74.006121°W

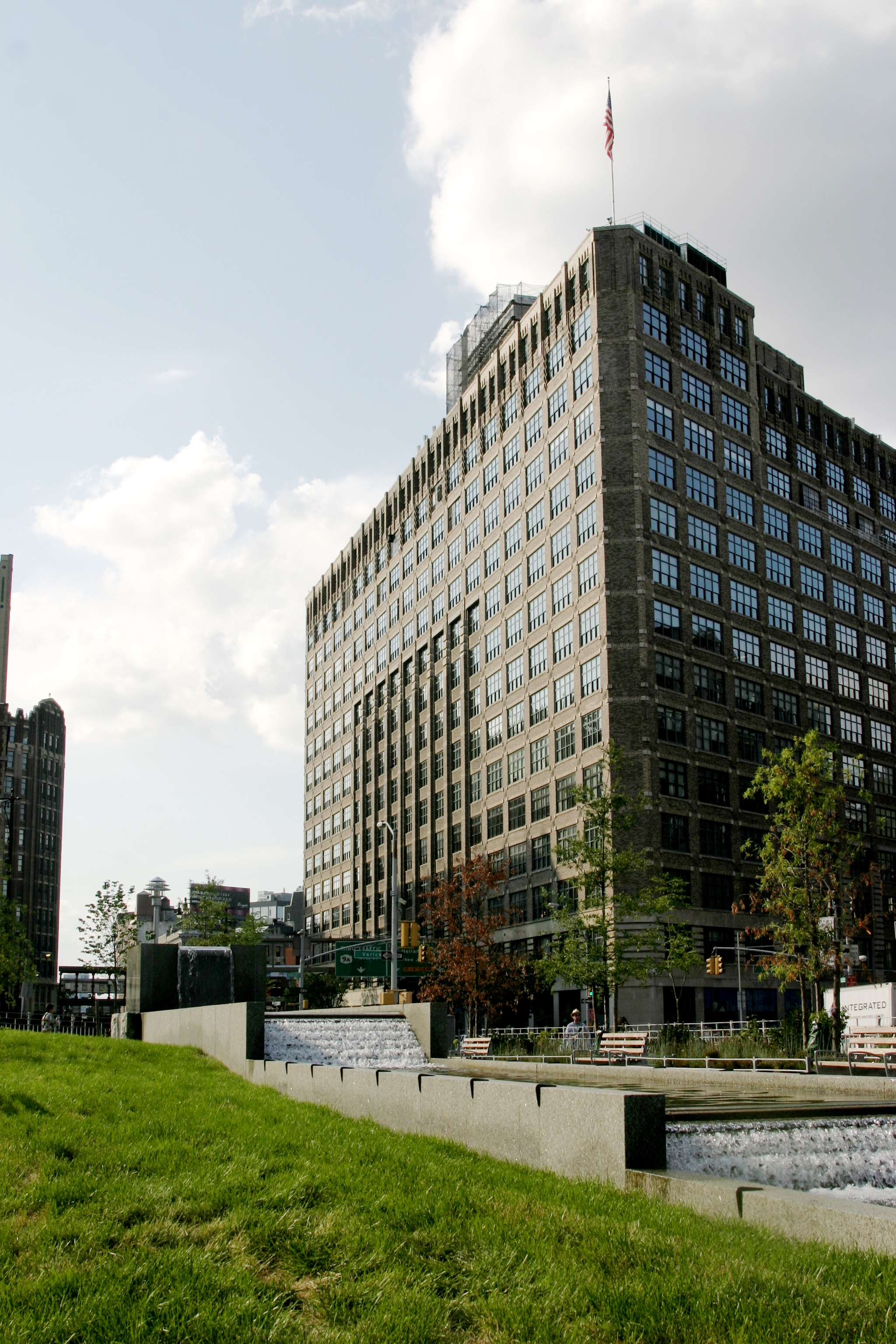
Fountain in Albert Capsouto Park, looking toward the Holland Plaza Building on NW corner of Canal and Varick

Albert Capsouto Park (formerly CaVaLa Park) is a triangular-shaped pocket park in the Tribeca neighborhood of Lower Manhattan in New York City. It is bounded by Canal Street to the northeast, Varick Street to the west, and Laight Street to the south. It is located just east of the Holland Tunnel exit plaza, formerly known as St. John's Park.

Ground was broken on the park in September 2008. Opened in November 2009, the park cost approximately $3.4 million to build. Formerly, the site was a parking lot. Following September 11, 2001, the lot was used as a staging area for search and rescue operations. In the following weeks members of the public placed flowers, cards and letters at the site, as it was one of the closest points to the former World Trade Center which was accessible. The park features a 114-foot fountain designed by local artist Elyn Zimmerman which refers to the canal which formerly ran along the path of Canal Street. In 2007 the design concept was recognized for Excellence in Design by the New York City Public Design Commission.

The original name, CaVaLa, referred to the streets surrounding the park ("Canal-Varick-Laight"), and was described by one nearby resident as "kitschy". A few months after it opened, a movement was started to rename the park after Tribeca restaurateur and community activist Albert Capsouto who had recently died. Capsouto had been a member of CB1 for twenty years before his death, and was frequently seen riding his bicycle around Tribeca. The name was officially adopted in 2010.
