= Hiram Smith =

Hiram Smith may refer to:

- Hiram F. Smith (1829–1893), American settler in the Pacific Northwest
- Hiram N. Smith (1817–1890) American politician from Wisconsin
- Hiram T. Smith (died 1838), casualty of the bloodless Maine Aroostook War
- Hiram Y. Smith (1843–1894), American politician from Iowa
- Hiram Smith Williams (1833–1921), Florida pioneer

== See also ==
- Hyrum Smith (disambiguation)
