= Aroostook War =

1838–1839 border dispute between New Brunswick and Maine

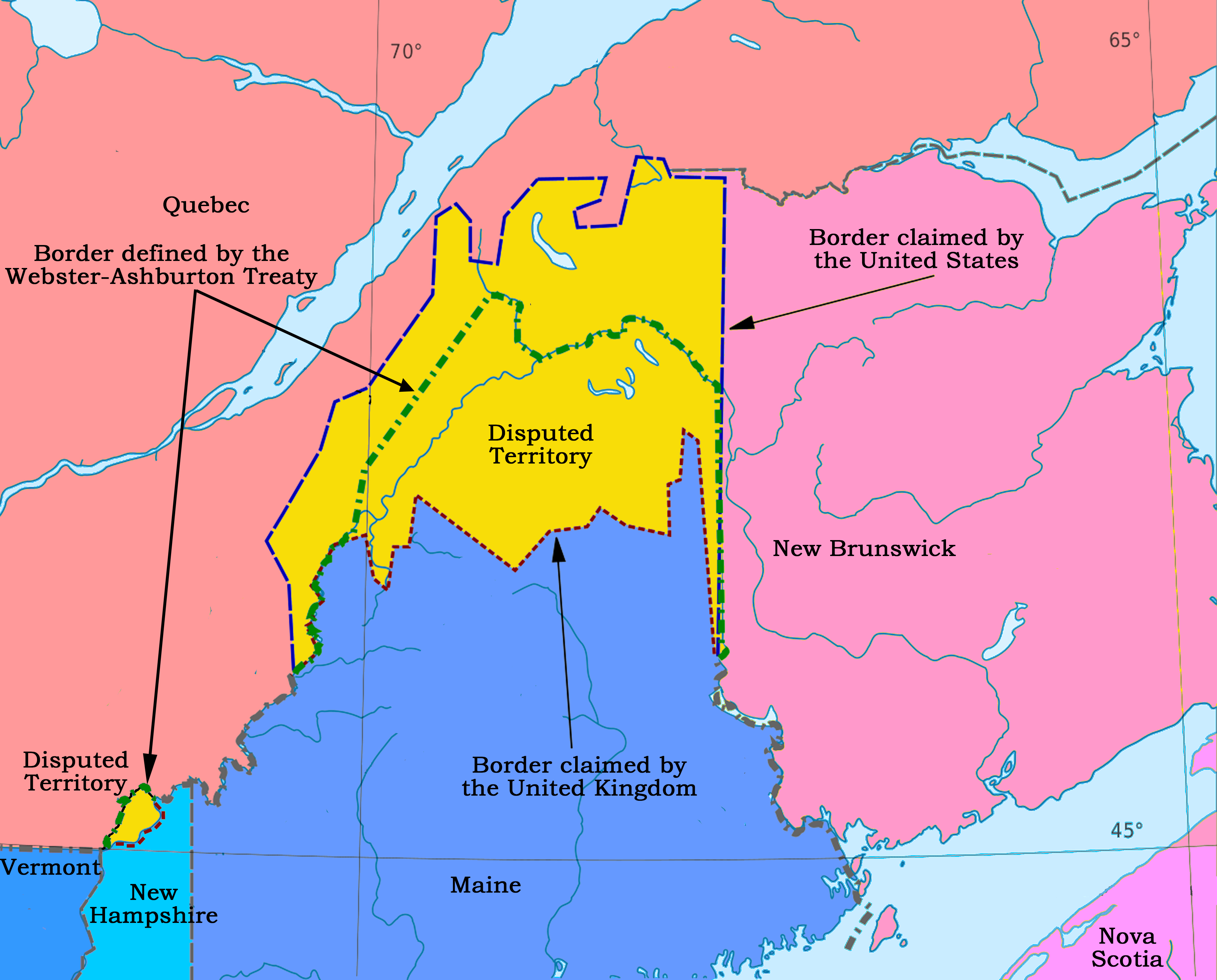
- Map showing the boundary claims and final border
Date	1838–1839
Location	Maine–New Brunswick border
Result	Compromise: Webster–Ashburton Treaty

Belligerents
United States; Maine	United Kingdom; Lower Canada; New Brunswick

Strength
6,000	15,000

Casualties and losses
None	None
- 38 non-combat deaths

The Aroostook War (sometimes called the Pork and Beans War), or the Madawaska War, was a military and civilian-involved confrontation in 1838–1839 between the United States and the United Kingdom over the international boundary between the British colonies of New Brunswick and Lower Canada and the U.S. state of Maine. The term "war" was rhetorical; local militia units were called out but never engaged in actual combat. The event is best described as an international incident.

Negotiations between British diplomat Lord Ashburton and US Secretary of State Daniel Webster settled the dispute. The Webster–Ashburton Treaty of 1842 established the final boundary between the countries, giving most of the disputed area to Maine while preserving an overland connection between Lower Canada and the Maritime colonies.

== Disputed border ==
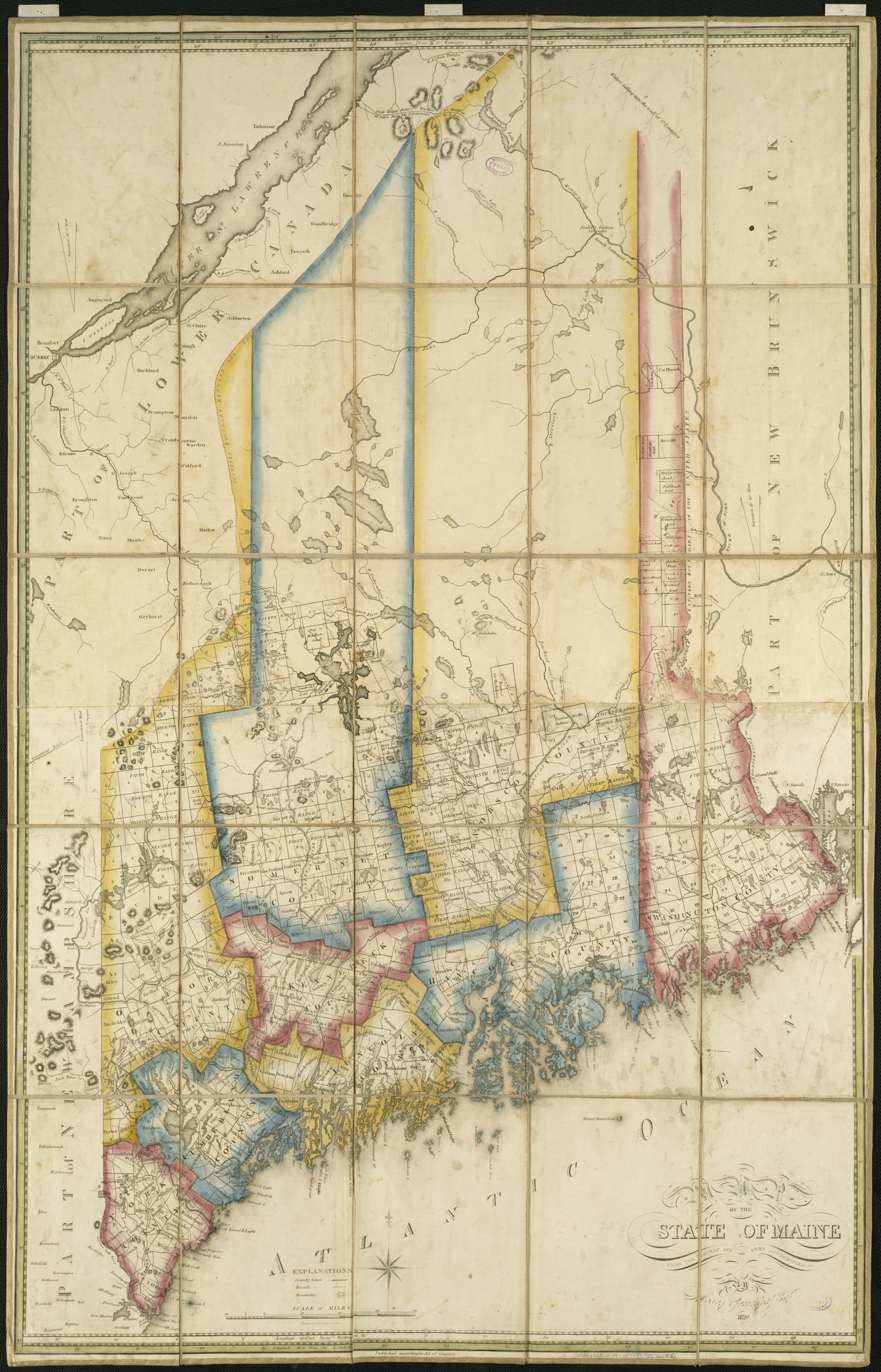
1820 map of Maine

The Treaty of Paris (1783) ended the Revolutionary War but did not clearly determine the boundary between British North America (Quebec and New Brunswick) and the United States. The Commonwealth of Massachusetts thereafter began issuing land grants in its District of Maine, including areas to which the British had already laid claim.

Questions regarding the boundary line arose not long afterward, and the negotiators of the 1794 Jay Treaty agreed that a commission should determine the source of the St. Croix River, the principal geographical feature identified in the earlier treaty. The parties sent a collaborative survey team to locate the mouth of the proper river, and to establish its headwaters. In 1798 the commission decided the southernmost portion of this boundary, from the mouth of the St. Croix to its source, which was determined to be the Chiputneticook Lakes. This commission did no work to finalize details of the border north of the lakes, which was described as running in a straight line north to the highlands separating the Saint Lawrence River watershed from watersheds draining to the south. It also left unresolved the question of who claimed which islands in Passamaquoddy Bay.

During the War of 1812, the British occupied most of eastern Maine, including Washington County, Hancock County, and parts of Penobscot County, for eight months, intending to permanently annex the region into British North America as New Ireland.

The Treaty of Ghent ended the war in 1815 and re-established the boundary line of the 1783 treaty. A commission was appointed which resolved most of the issues surrounding the islands (Machias Seal Island continues to be formally disputed between the United States and Canada). A recommendation by the British commissioner that the northward line to the "highlands" end at Mars Hill (about 100 mi or 160 km south of where this line was eventually negotiated to end) was rejected.

When Maine broke away from Massachusetts as a separate state in 1820, after the Missouri Compromise was passed, the status and location of the border emerged as a chief concern to the new state government. Massachusetts also retained an interest in the matter, as it retained ownership of half the public lands in Maine, including a large part of the disputed territory, as part of the separation. For their part the British considered that Maine's territory protruding so deeply into British territory and nearly reaching the St. Lawrence in some areas constituted a serious hindrance to communications between Lower Canada and the maritime colonies of New Brunswick and Nova Scotia. Securing the northern half of Maine would cut travel time between Quebec City and Halifax almost in half, as it lay directly between them.

As late as September 1825, Maine and Massachusetts land agents issued deeds, sold timber permits, took censuses, and recorded births, deaths, and marriages in the contested area of the Saint John River valley and its tributaries. Massachusetts land agent George Coffin recorded in his journal during one such journey during autumn 1825, returning from the Upper Saint John and Madawaska area to Fredericton, New Brunswick, that a thunderstorm had ignited a forest fire. This Miramichi Fire destroyed thousands of acres of prime New Brunswick timber, killed hundreds of settlers, left thousands more homeless, and destroyed several thriving communities. The journal entries of the newly appointed Governor of New Brunswick record the destruction and comments that survival of New Brunswick depended on the vast forests to the west in the area disputed with the United States.

== Growing tensions ==
Mostly early Acadians (descendants of the original French colonists) settled the Saint John and Madawaska River basins. Some Americans then settled in the Aroostook River Valley. During 1826–1830, provincial timber interests also settled the west bank of the Saint John river and its tributaries, and British families built homes in Woodstock, Tobique, and Grand Falls, New Brunswick.

The French-speaking population of Madawaska were "Brayons" – nominally British subjects – who (at least rhetorically) considered themselves to belong to the unofficial "République du Madawaska", and thus professed allegiance to neither the United States nor Great Britain. Another factor was the mutual sympathy between John Baker (see below) and many members of French-speaking communities located near Baker's mill, who both felt betrayed by their respective authorities. The population of the area swelled with outsiders, however, when winter freed lumbermen from farm work to "long-pole" up the Saint John River to the valley. These migrant seasonal lumbermen caused particular tension for the governments of Maine and Massachusetts, responsible for the protection of resources and revenues of their respective states. Some itinerant lumbermen eventually settled year-round in the Saint John valley. Most settlers found themselves too remote from the authorities to apply formally for land. Disputes heated as factions maneuvered for control over the best stands of trees.

John Baker on 4 July 1827 raised an American flag, which his wife made, on the western bank of Baker Brook at its confluence with the Saint John River, on the river's left (here northern) bank, now Canadian territory. New Brunswick authorities subsequently arrested Baker, fined him £25, and held him in jail until he paid his fine.

== Crisis of 1830 ==
In preparation for a United States census in 1830, the Maine Legislature sent John Deane and Edward James to the disputed area to document the numbers of inhabitants and to assess the extent of what they considered to be British trespass. During that summer, several residents of the west bank of the Saint John at Madawaska filed requests for inclusion of their land in Maine. Acting on advice from Penobscot County, Maine, officials, they called a meeting to select representatives preparatory to incorporating Madawaska as a town. A local resident from the east bank of the Saint John river alerted local representatives of the New Brunswick militia, who entered the hall during one of these meetings and threatened to arrest any resident attempting to organize. The meetings continued, however, even as more militiamen arrived. New Brunswick authorities arrested some residents, others fled to the woods, and local Americans sent letters to the Maine authorities in Augusta. The Treaty of Ghent (ratified by the U.S. Senate in 1815) provided for the establishment of a neutral third party as arbitrator in the event that a joint commission could not agree on the border; commissioners Cornelius P. Van Ness of Vermont and Thomas Henry Barclay for Britain asked King William I of the Netherlands to arbitrate.

William was given a topographical map of the disputed area with the parties' arguments, with detailed scientific and diplomatic evidence for each. A century later, Canadian Hugh L. Keenleyside and American Gerald S. Brown wrote:

There can now be little doubt that the American claim was justified by the intentions of the commissioners of 1783. It is morally certain that the intention then was to re-enact the boundary line of the Proclamation of 1763, and that the British argument based on the difference between the Bay of Fundy and the Atlantic Ocean was simply an ingenious quibble. Unfortunately, the Treaty of 1783 was so badly worded that it could not be translated into a practical topographical boundary. The British case was not a sound one, and a decision based solely upon justice would, in all probability, have given Maine more than was ultimately received.

William indeed found reconciling the treaty with the map so difficult that he gave up. On 20 January 1831 he called the treaty "inexplicable and impractical", and compromised by drawing a line between the two listed options. The United States received 7,908 square miles (20,480 km^{2}) and Britain received 4,119 square miles (10,670 km^{2}). The British government accepted this decision, but Maine rejected it and the new treaty failed to pass the United States Senate. Although the king had not made a judicial decision for one side as expected, he had followed the arbitration agreement's request to "make a decision on the points of difference". The American refusal to accept his decision would ultimately cost the United States 900 square miles (2,300 km^{2}) of territory.

== Posses, arrests, and the mobilization of militia ==
In 1835 the British rescinded their acceptance of the Dutch compromise and offered another boundary, which the Americans rejected. The United States offered to ask Maine to accept the Saint John River as the boundary, which the British rejected. In 1836 Maine took a special census. Penobscot County Census Representative Ebenezer Greeley thus began a census of the upper Aroostook River territory. Governor John Harvey of New Brunswick had Greeley arrested. Letters from New Brunswick accused the Governor of Maine of bribery and threatened military action if Maine continued to exercise jurisdiction in the basins of the Aroostook river and its tributaries. In response, Governor Robert Dunlap of Maine issued a general order announcing that a foreign power had invaded Maine. In March 1838, the state demanded a survey based on the American claim and that the federal government enforce the claim. Washington refused, but did authorize a survey for possible fortifications. The state legislature authorized $800,000 for military defense, and Congress gave the President authority to raise the militia with a $10,000,000 budget. Meanwhile, Nova Scotia voted $100,000 in funds to defend New Brunswick.

Both American and New Brunswick lumberjacks cut timber in the disputed territory during the winter of 1838–1839, according to reports submitted to the Maine Legislature, resulting in the Battle of Caribou and other conflicts. On 24 January 1839, the Maine Legislature authorized the newly elected Governor John Fairfield to send Maine's land agent, Rufus McIntire, the Penobscot County sheriff, and a posse of volunteer militia to the upper Aroostook to pursue and arrest the New Brunswickers. The posse left Bangor, Maine, on 8 February 1839. Arriving at T10 R5 (now Masardis), the posse established a camp at the junction of Saint Croix Stream and the Aroostook River and began confiscating New Brunswick lumbering equipment, and sending any lumbermen caught and arrested back to Maine for trial. A group of New Brunswick lumbermen learned of these activities and, unable to retrieve their oxen and horses, broke into the arsenal in Woodstock to arm themselves. They gathered their own posse, and seized the Maine land agent and his assistants in the middle of the night. This New Brunswick posse transported the Maine officials in chains to Woodstock and held them for an "interview".

Terming the Americans "political prisoners", Sir John Harvey sent correspondence to Washington, D.C., that he lacked the authority to act on the arrests without instructions from London, which he awaited. He added that he intended meanwhile to exercise his responsibilities to ensure British jurisdiction over the Aroostook, and he demanded removal from the region of all Maine forces. He then sent his military commander to the T10 R5 campsite and ordered the Maine militia to leave. Captain Rines and the others refused, stating they were following orders and doing their duty. The Maine side then took the New Brunswick military commander himself into custody.

On 15 February 1839, the Maine Legislature authorized militia Major General Isaac Hodsdon to lead 1,000 additional volunteers to augment the posse then on the upper Aroostook River. Additional correspondence from governor Sir John Harvey of New Brunswick, reports of British Army troops arriving from the West Indies, reports of the Mohawk people offering their services to Quebec, and reports of New Brunswick forces gathering on the Saint John River resulted in the issuance of General Order No 7 on 19 February 1839, calling for a general draft of Maine militia. Maine militia companies mustered in Bangor and traveled to the Upper Aroostook until 26 February 1839, when the early construction of Fort Fairfield, which the earlier posse built on the Aroostook River from seized stolen timber, allowed for camping troops on the eastern boundary.

== American and British governments step in ==
1839 map of the disputed territory

During Congressional debates in Washington on 2 March 1839, Representative Francis Ormand Jonathan Smith of Maine outlined the events and the various communications sent and received since 1825. Representative Smith noted the primary responsibility of the national government to protect and defend its own territory and citizens, but declared that Maine would defend its territory alone if the national government chose to not fulfill its obligations. President Martin Van Buren assigned Brigadier General Winfield Scott, then involved in the Cherokee removal, to the conflict area; he arrived in Boston in early March 1839.

Additional information arriving in Washington through April and May 1839 kept Congressional debate lively until Congress authorized a force of 50,000 men and appropriated $10 million, placed at the disposal of the President in the event foreign military troops crossed into United States territory during the Congressional recess of summer 1839. Maine initially committed three thousand to ten thousand militia to the conflict in addition to the land agent's posse.

Sir John Harvey had supervised Winfield Scott during his time as prisoner of war during the War of 1812, and the President and his advisers saw that relationship as a point of mutual respect. Pursuant to the terms of the truce for administration within the disputed area, the Maine Legislature on 6 April 1839 created an armed civil posse. On advice of Brigadier General Scott, Maine issued General Orders to recall the militia in May and June 1839 and to replace the militiamen with the armed civil posse. The office of the Maine state land agent led the armed civil posse with Deputy Land Agent William Parrott at Fort Fairfield and Captain Stover Rines at Camp Jarvis on the Fish River (later Fort Kent, Maine). The United States Army began the permanent structure of Fort Fairfield in April 1839 and that of Fort Kent in October 1839. Major R. M. Kirby commanded of Hancock Barracks post near Houlton, Maine, with three companies of the U.S. 1st Artillery Regiment. Four companies of the British 11th Regiment of Foot marched to the area from Quebec City to represent Canada with the intent to build a suitable barracks across the Saint John River from Fort Kent. New Brunswick meanwhile armed every tributary of the Saint John River that flowed from the Aroostook Territory with regular and militia soldiers.

In 1840, Maine created Aroostook County, Maine, to administer the civilian authority of the area. However, reports of collusion resulted in the Maine Executive Council assigning Alphus Lyons to investigate Sheriff Packard and District Attorney Tabor. The two nations agreed to refer the dispute to a boundary commission, but further clashes between their forces continued in the interim.

== Settlement ==
Webster–Ashburton Treaty

Neither nation wanted a war that would have greatly interfered with the two nations' trade. Daniel Webster and Alexander Baring, 1st Baron Ashburton, reached a compromise, the Webster–Ashburton Treaty of Washington in 1842, which settled the Maine–Canada–New Brunswick boundary and the boundaries between British North America and New Hampshire, Michigan and Minnesota. This treaty awarded 7,015 square miles (18,170 km^{2}) to the United States and 5,012 square miles (12,980 km^{2}) to British control. The British retained the northern area of the disputed territory, including the Halifax Road with its year-round overland military communications between the Province of Canada and Nova Scotia. The U.S. federal government agreed to pay the states of Maine and Massachusetts $150,000 each for the loss of the lands of their states and for expenses incurred during the time Maine's armed civil posse administered the truce period.

Webster used a map that American Jared Sparks found in the Paris Archives while searching for pro-American evidence, which Benjamin Franklin had supposedly marked with a red line, to persuade Maine and Massachusetts to accept the agreement. The map showed that the disputed region belonged to the British, and so helped convince the representatives of those states to accept the compromise. Webster replied to later criticism for hiding the map, "I did not think it a very urgent duty to go to Lord Ashburton and tell him that I had found a bit of doubtful evidence in Paris." Ashburton agreed, saying "My own opinion is that in this respect no reproach can fairly be made." The British Foreign Office, without Ashburton's knowledge, acted similarly by hiding the "Mitchell's map", which generally supported the American case. Some claim that British officials created the Franklin map as a fake to pressure the American negotiators. The evidence is that the British map placed the entire disputed area on the American side of the border.

While Lord Palmerston and many Conservatives in Parliament denounced the treaty, the British government was pleased, and Conservatives such as Benjamin Disraeli supported it. Similarly, Maine and Massachusetts complained but were happy to be paid for the loss of territory. Canada and New Brunswick were unhappy, however, as it viewed the treaty as the British improving relations with the United States by permitting American territory to separate Canada from the Maritimes. Keenleyside and Brown later wrote "Unjust as such accusations are, it is nevertheless a fact that many Canadians still consider the Ashburton Treaty of 1842 to be the first and most important instance of the loss of Canadian rights due to the complacency of Great Britain and the crooked diplomacy of the United States."

British North America retained a militarily vital connection between Canada and the Maritime colonies, as well as a project for a commercial right-of-way that would allow British commercial interests to transit through Maine on their way to and from southern New Brunswick or Nova Scotia. This right-of way is still used in 2013 by the Eastern Maine Railway subsidiary of the New Brunswick Railway Company and by the Montreal, Maine and Atlantic Railway. That trackage was originally part of the Canadian Pacific Railway's Sherbrooke – Saint John rail line.

== Casualties ==
The Aroostook War, though without direct combat, did see militiamen die of accident and disease; one example was Private Hiram T. Smith.

== In popular culture ==
The tensions leading up to the Aroostook War are referenced in the 1835 short story "The Squatter" by John Neal. The narration of the main character, Hayes, voices critical comments on these events from a soldier's point of view before the conflict came to a head.

== See also ==
- Caroline Affair
- Nootka Crisis
- Oregon boundary dispute
  - Pig War (1859)
- Republic of Indian Stream
- Republic of Madawaska
