= Halifax Road =

The Halifax Road or Grand Communication Route was used by the British as an overland communication link between the British colonies of Nova Scotia, New Brunswick, Lower Canada (Quebec), and Upper Canada (Ontario) in the winter months when the St. Lawrence River was frozen.

It was used as a mail route as well as a military avenue for British soldiers. It was first used in the transportation of soldiers during the War of 1812 when the 104th New Brunswick Regiment marched from Fredericton, New Brunswick, to Kingston in Upper Canada. The road was a large contributor to the so-called "Aroostook War" as the United States claimed a portion of it was in U.S. territory. This road would become the key to the settlement of the Webster–Ashburton treaty of 1842.

This route was also used during the Canadian Rebellions and the Trent Affair to transport British soldiers to inland destinations in the winter months.

The Ontario section from Kingston, Ontario to the Ontario–Quebec border was likely the current route of Highway 2 (Ontario).

== See also ==
- Kingston Road (Toronto) – connected Kingston, Ontario with York, Upper Canada
