= Battle of Caribou =

1838 skirmish

Coordinates: 47.3339°N 68.2620°W

Date	December 1838
Location	Caribou, Maine, United States
Status	Resolved: Canadian lumberjacks flee area after bear attack and opposing gunfire from Eaton guard; Webster-Ashburton Treaty signed August 9, 1842

Belligerents
United States	Canada

Casualties and losses
None	2 wounded by black bears during confrontation
- 1 black bear killed by Canadian lumberjacks, the gunfire from whom sparked the Americans to open fire.

The Battle of Caribou was a minor and ultimately bloodless skirmish between U.S. and British (Canadian) armed lumberjacks during the Aroostook War. It added to the growing tensions between the respective governments and encouraged the mobilization of local militias to the area, which nearly sparked an armed conflict.

== Background ==
The end of the American War for Independence defined the border between Canada and Maine only vaguely, and this was not clarified at the end of the War of 1812. The result was that both sides claimed the land there, but got along relatively well.

At one time the St. John River basin had been valued by the British government as a source of timber for ships' masts and other military uses, but the government had found other sources by 1804 and turned a blind eye to stealing timber on those lands. By the 1830s Canadians and Americans held markedly different views toward the issue of poaching timber there, whether poached by Canadian or U. S. citizens. The city of St. John came to depend on the sale of this poached timber.

U. S. settlers continued to move up closer to the St. John River and British officials mostly left them alone until they began to organize themselves into a town subject to U. S. law, which resulted in British attempts to arrest the participants. During the winter of 1838–39 tensions flared over which government owned the territory in the vicinity of Caribou, Maine, near the Aroostook River. Lumberjacks from both Maine and New Brunswick each wished to harvest wood to the exclusion of their competitors from across the border, and by December 1838, competition coupled with fierce national pride led both sides to carry weapons for their own protection.

== The conflict ==
On December 29, 1838, New Brunswick lumberjacks were spotted felling trees on the estate that had formerly belonged to First Barbary War hero William Eaton. Eaton family members contacted American lumberjacks and other irregulars in the area, and an informal guard was deployed. On New Year's Eve, the New Brunswick woodcutters returned, and were promptly ordered to leave by the Eaton guard. Shouting began, and both sides drew firearms and prepared to fire. As this was occurring, however, a group of three Canadian lumberjacks were unexpectedly attacked by a black bear defending a small nearby cub. Though black bears are native to the area, they typically hibernate by that time of year, confusing the experienced outdoorsmen. The lumberjacks were able to shoot and kill the bear, but not before two of them suffered injuries. The Americans, assuming the shots were directed at them, fired several shots in retaliation. Though none of the Canadians were actually hit by fire, this coupled with the bear attack caused them to withdraw from the area.

== Aftermath ==
News of the encounter quickly spread to both sides. In Maine, Governor John Fairfield ordered the local militia to the site to arrest the "unruly wood thieves" in February 1839. The Canadian lumbermen responded by seizing the Maine Land Agent, and an international incident was sparked. Tensions remained high, with several arrests on both sides, until the Webster-Ashburton Treaty signed August 9, 1842, finally settled the issue.
