= Hyrum Smith (disambiguation) =

Hyrum Smith (1800–1844) was a Latter Day Saint presiding patriarch and brother of movement founder Joseph Smith, Jr.

Hyrum Smith may also refer to:

- Hyrum G. Smith (1879–1932), presiding patriarch of The Church of Jesus Christ of Latter-day Saints
- Hyrum M. Smith (1872–1918), apostle of The Church of Jesus Christ of Latter-day Saints
- Hyrum W. Smith (1943–2019), founder of Franklin Quest Co. and co-founder of FranklinCovey

== See also ==
- Hiram Smith (disambiguation)
- List of people with surname Smith
