= Isaac Hodsdon =

American military leader, politician

- Born: December 18, 1781
- Died: May 24, 1864 (aged 82)
- Military career
- Allegiance: United States
- Branch: United States Army; Maine Militia
- Rank: Major General
- Unit: 33rd Regiment
- Commands: Maine's Militia
- Conflicts: War of 1812; Aroostock War

Isaac Hodsdon (December 18, 1781 – May 24, 1864) was a government official and Maine militia commander. He served in the War of 1812 as Captain in the US Army 33rd Regiment and became Colonel after the Battle of Hampden. He eventually became a Major General and commanded Maine's militia troops in the Aroostook War. He lived in Corinth, Maine.

On 15 February 1839, the Maine Legislature authorized militia Major General Hodsdon to lead 1,000 additional volunteers to augment the posse then on the upper Aroostook River. Additional correspondence from governor Sir John Harvey of New Brunswick, reports of British Army troops arriving from the West Indies, reports of Quebec possibly gaining the services of Mohawk nation, and reports of a gathering of the New Brunswick forces on the Saint John River all caused General Order No 7 to be issued on 19 February 1839, which drafted the framework for a Maine militia. Maine militia companies mustered in Bangor and traveled to the Upper Aroostook until 26 February 1839, when the early construction of Fort Fairfield, which the earlier posse built on the Aroostook River from seized stolen timber, allowed for camping troops on the eastern boundary.

Following the death of one Jeremiah Littlefield from yellow fever, Hodsdon adopted Littlefield's son, who became known as John Littlefield Hodsdon. He too had a long and distinguished military career.

== Career ==
Hodsdon was appointed clerk of county courts. In 1834, Hodsdon was nominated for the office of mayor of Bangor but he didn't win the race. He built a store in Corinth in 1830.
