= Official Languages Act (New Brunswick) =

New Brunswick law

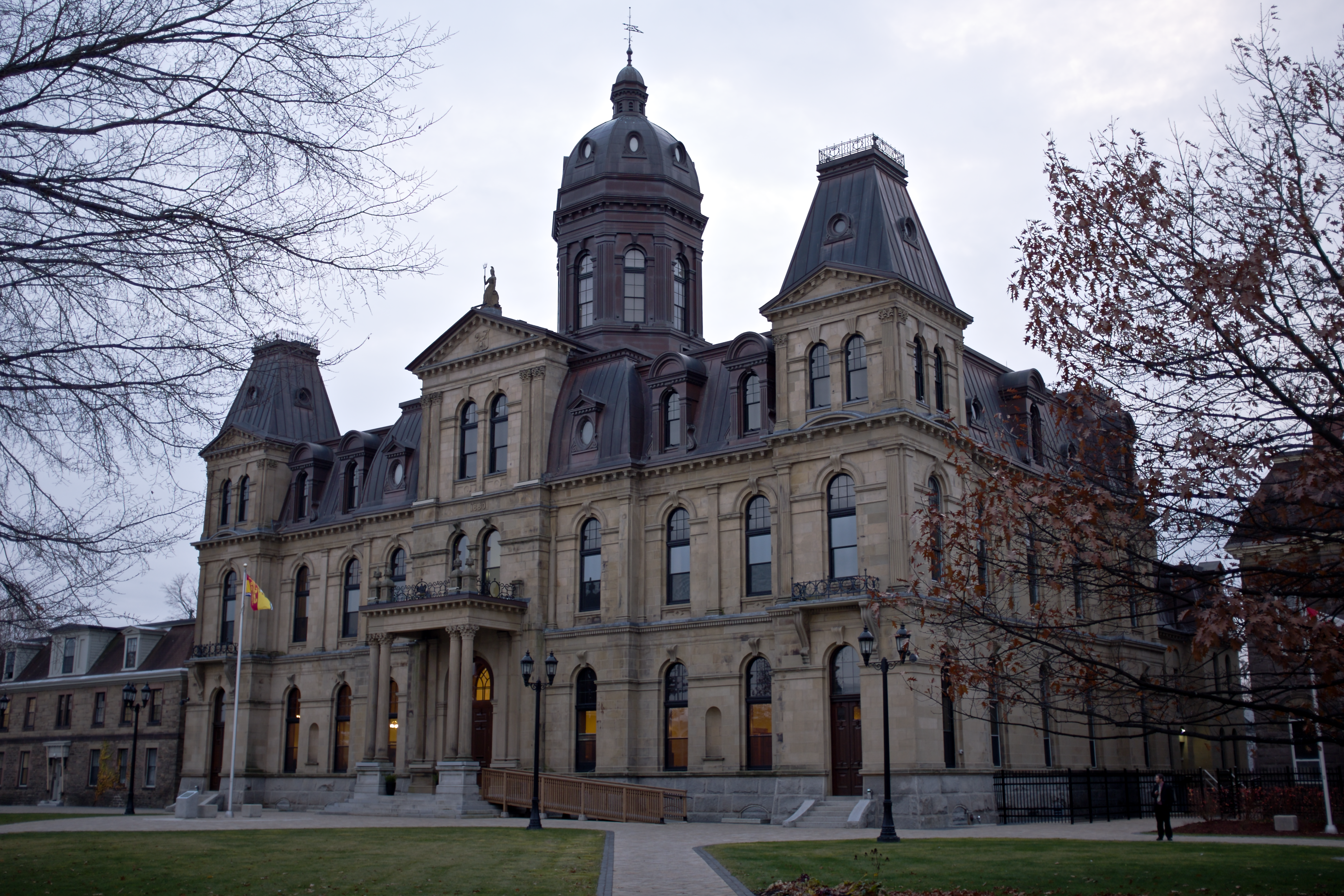

Legislative Assembly of New Brunswick
- Citation: S.N.B. 2002, c. O-0.5
- Status: Current legislation

The Official Languages Act (French: Loi sur les langues officielles) is a law enacted by the Legislative Assembly of New Brunswick which makes New Brunswick the only officially bilingual province of Canada. This law prescribes that English and French are the two official languages of New Brunswick and have equal status in all provincial government institutions. The province of Manitoba was also bilingual when it was created in 1870, but has not maintained this status.

== History ==
The first Official Languages Act of New Brunswick was adopted by the Liberal government of premier Louis Robichaud on 18 April 1969, a few months before the adoption of the federal Official Languages Act. This law affects life in the province to the present day. The original text has been analyzed by the Official Languages and Bilingualism Institute (OLBI) at the University of Ottawa.

In 1982, the Canadian Charter of Rights and Freedoms was added to the Constitution of Canada, and Section 16 of the charter entrenched the official bilingualism of New Brunswick in the Charter. In 1993, the Charter was modified by the insertion of section 16.1 which guarantees the equality of English-speaking and French-speaking residents of New Brunswick.

In 2002, a new Official Languages Act was adopted by the Progressive Conservative government of Bernard Lord, replacing the 1969 Act, in order to include all the constitutional obligations of the province toward the two official languages imposed by the Charter. The new law created an Office of the Commissioner of Official Languages of New Brunswick with a mandate to apply the Official Languages Act in governmental institutions, and to promote bilingualism in New Brunswick. It also considers matters such as reasonable criteria for the translation of municipal laws, and the revision of the act every 10 years.

The language commissioners to date have been:

2003-2013: Michel A. Carrier

2013-2018: Katherine d'Entremont

2018-2020: Michel A. Carrier (acting)

2020 to date: Shirley MacLean
