= Hiram T. Smith =

American soldier

Private Hiram T. Smith is a legendary casualty of the bloodless Maine Aroostook War, having died in 1838. Although one of roughly 38 men killed (all were non-combat deaths), he is the most famous because many locals consider him the only casualty of the war. A memorial placed in the middle of the Haynesville Woods along U.S. Route 2A also added to his fame. In 1933, the Daughters of the American Revolution (DAR) placed a marble marker at the site and later updated it with a granite marker that still stands today.

It is unknown how exactly Smith died or why he stands out from the rest of the men who died, as there is no official reason for his death. There are several ongoing theories:

1. He froze to death. Temperatures in that area of Maine during the winter of 1838 reached -40º Fahrenheit (-40º Celsius). However, many believe he died in the summer of 1838.
2. Run over by an army supply wagon.
3. Killed by a horse when he went to feed them.
4. Falling through the ice of Lake St. Clair. While he may have died from falling through the ice, there has never been a Lake St. Clair in Maine.
5. Shot for desertion. Probably also not true, as this likely would have had a record of some type.
6. Fell into a pond and drowned. A pond now called Soldier's Pond has a marker stating "Soldier's Grave Aroostook War 1838" which is attributed to Smith but the year would be inconsistent with reports he died in 1839, and is not the same marker the DAR erected.
