= Mitchell Map =

Historic map of the United States of America

The Mitchell Map

The Mitchell Map is a map made by John Mitchell (1711–1768), which was reprinted several times during the second half of the 18th century. The map, formally titled A map of the British and French dominions in North America &c., was used as a primary map source during negotiations for the 1783 Treaty of Paris for defining the boundaries of the newly independent United States. The map remained important for resolving border disputes between the United States and Canada as recently as the 1980s dispute over the Gulf of Maine fisheries. The Mitchell Map is the most comprehensive map of eastern North America made during the colonial era. Its size is about 6.5 feet (2.0 m) wide by 4.5 feet (1.4 m) high.

== John Mitchell's initiation as a map maker ==
John Mitchell was not a professional geographer or map-maker. Son of a wealthy Virginian family in Lancaster County, on Virginia's Northern Neck, he had been educated at Edinburgh University, Scotland; this education included the first two years of the three-year medical program. Returning to coastal Virginia, he practiced as a physician and studied the local botany. Ill health forced Mitchell and his wife to leave Virginia for London in 1746. There, he served as a consultant on exotic plants to noblemen interested in gardens. Also, it was there that Mitchell made his important map. Map historians have understandably been interested in why a physician and botanist, who had shown no previous interest in cartography, would make such a large and detailed map.

Until recently, historians have argued that Mitchell was upset by the lack of interest shown by politicians in London about colonial affairs and so set out to warn them about the dangers posed to the British colonies by the French. Mitchell did so, on his own initiative, by making a first map of North America in 1750, which he then showed to the politicians he knew through his botanical and gardening activities. The map so impressed George Montagu-Dunk, 2nd Earl of Halifax, appointed president of the Board of Trade and Plantations in 1748, that Halifax opened up the official archives and solicited new maps from the colonies for Mitchell to make a new and better map. This was the map published in 1755. That is, the motive force for preparations against the French threat is understood to have come from a colonist who sought to take control of the colonies' future on behalf of the other colonists. (See, for example, the accounts by Ristow and Berkeley & Berkeley.)

A reexamination of the archival evidence indicates, however, that Mitchell made his first map in 1750 at Halifax's behest. Halifax became president of the Board of Trade directly after the conclusion of the War of the Austrian Succession (1744–1748) and its North American component, King George's War. The war had ended in stalemate and a return to the Anglo-French status quo of the 1714 Treaty of Utrecht. In fact, it was a common conviction that it was only a matter of time before another global Anglo-French war would begin, and it was commonly expected that the spark of the new conflict would be the North American colonies. It was then that Halifax latched onto Mitchell as an expert informant on all things colonial; one of his requests, apparently, was for Mitchell to make a new map to show the territorial situation in North America. Certainly, it was only after 1749 that Mitchell's correspondence revealed his new interests in both geography and politics. (See Edney 2008.)

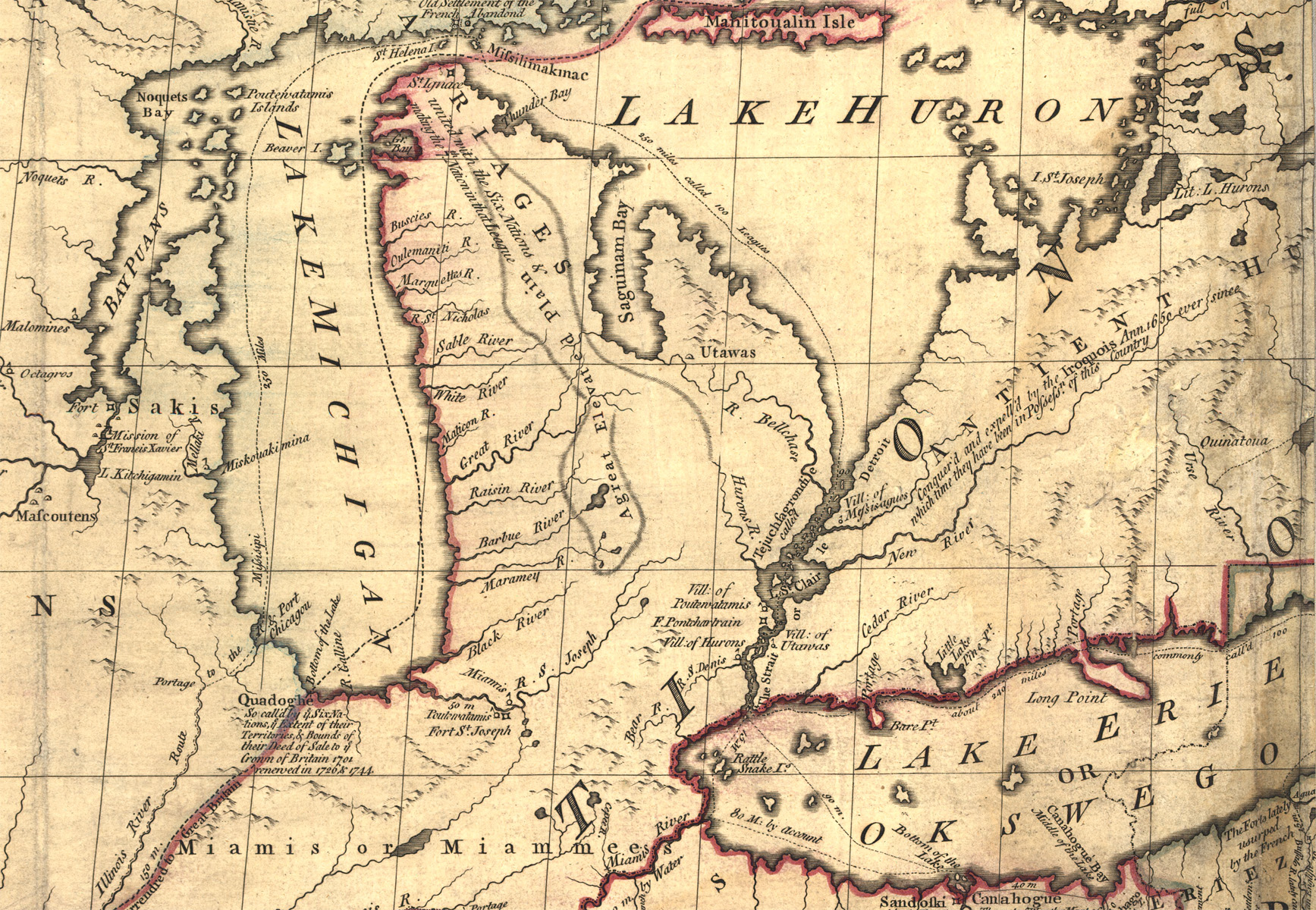
The Mitchell Map, excerpt showing Michigan area

== Creation of the map ==
Mitchell compiled a first map in 1750 from the materials that he could find in London, in official archives and private hands. It proved to be inadequate. Halifax accordingly ordered the governors of the British colonies to send new maps, which most did. These became the basis, when fitted into the overall geographical frame provided by the maps of the French geographer Guillaume Delisle. Late in 1754, Halifax was using one manuscript copy of Mitchell's second map to successfully promote his political position (no compromise with the French) within the British cabinet in the build-up to the Seven Years' War aka French and Indian War. Halifax also permitted Mitchell to have the map published: it appeared in April 1755, engraved by Thomas Kitchin and published by Andrew Millar.

The published map bore the complete title A map of the British and French dominions in North America, with the roads, distances, limits, and extent of the settlements, humbly inscribed to the Right Honourable the Earl of Halifax, and the other Right Honourable the Lords Commissioners for Trade & Plantations,. It bore the copyright date of 13 February 1755, but the map was probably not sold to the public until April or even May. Minor corrections to the map's printing plates were made probably during the printing process (for example, the name and address of the publisher were corrected). A copy of the map owned by King George III of Great Britain is in the British Library's collection.

The geographer John Green (né Braddock Mead) criticized Mitchell and his map soon after it appeared, emphasizing two failings with respect to Nova Scotia (an area of particular dispute with the French). Mitchell, Green noted, had used neither the astronomical observations for latitude and longitude made by Marquis Joseph Bernard de Chabert in the 1740s nor a 1715 chart of the Nova Scotia coast. In response, Mitchell released a new version of his map, now with two large blocks of text that described all of his data sources; the new version of the map also adjusted the coastline in line with Chabert's work but rejected the 1715 chart as deeply flawed. This version of the map, which Mitchell referred to as the "second edition," is commonly thought to have appeared sometime in 1757, but advertisements in the (London) Public Advertiser and Gazetteer and London Daily Advertiser on 23 April 1756 clearly indicate that this new map appeared at that time.

The map continued to be corrected and some boundaries updated, even after Mitchell's death in 1768, as detailed in Edney (2007).

== Map ==
Mitchell's map was printed in eight sheets; when assembled, it measures 136 cm by 195 cm (4 feet 6 inches by 6 feet 5 inches; height x width). The initial impressions printed in 1755 have a consistent coloring outlining British colonial claims. Mitchell extended the southern colonies across the entire continent, even over established Spanish territory west of the Mississippi. Mitchell divided up the Haudenosaunee territories (as he understood them, reaching from Lake Champlain [Lac Irocoisia] to the Mississippi, and north of Lake Superior) between Virginia and New York, leaving only a much-reduced territory to the French.

Mitchell's map was expensive but it spawned many cheaper variants that trumpeted Halifax and Mitchell's powerful colonial vision to the British public. One of these, published in December 1755 by "a Society of Anti-Gallicans", restricted the French even further just to Quebec.

The map is liberally sprinkled with text describing and explaining various features, especially in regions that were relatively unknown or which were subject to political dispute. Many notes describe the natural resources and potential for settlement of frontier regions. Others describe Indian tribes. Many Indian settlements are shown, along with important Indian trails.

Since Mitchell's main objective was to show the French threat to the British colonies, there is a very strong pro-British bias in the map, especially with regard to the Haudenosaunee. The map makes clear that the Haudenosaunee were not just allies of Britain, but subjects, and that all Haudenosaunee land was therefore British territory. Huge parts of the continent are noted as being British due to Haudenosaunee conquest of one tribe or another. French activity within the Haudenosaunee-claimed lands is noted, explicitly or implicitly, as illegal.

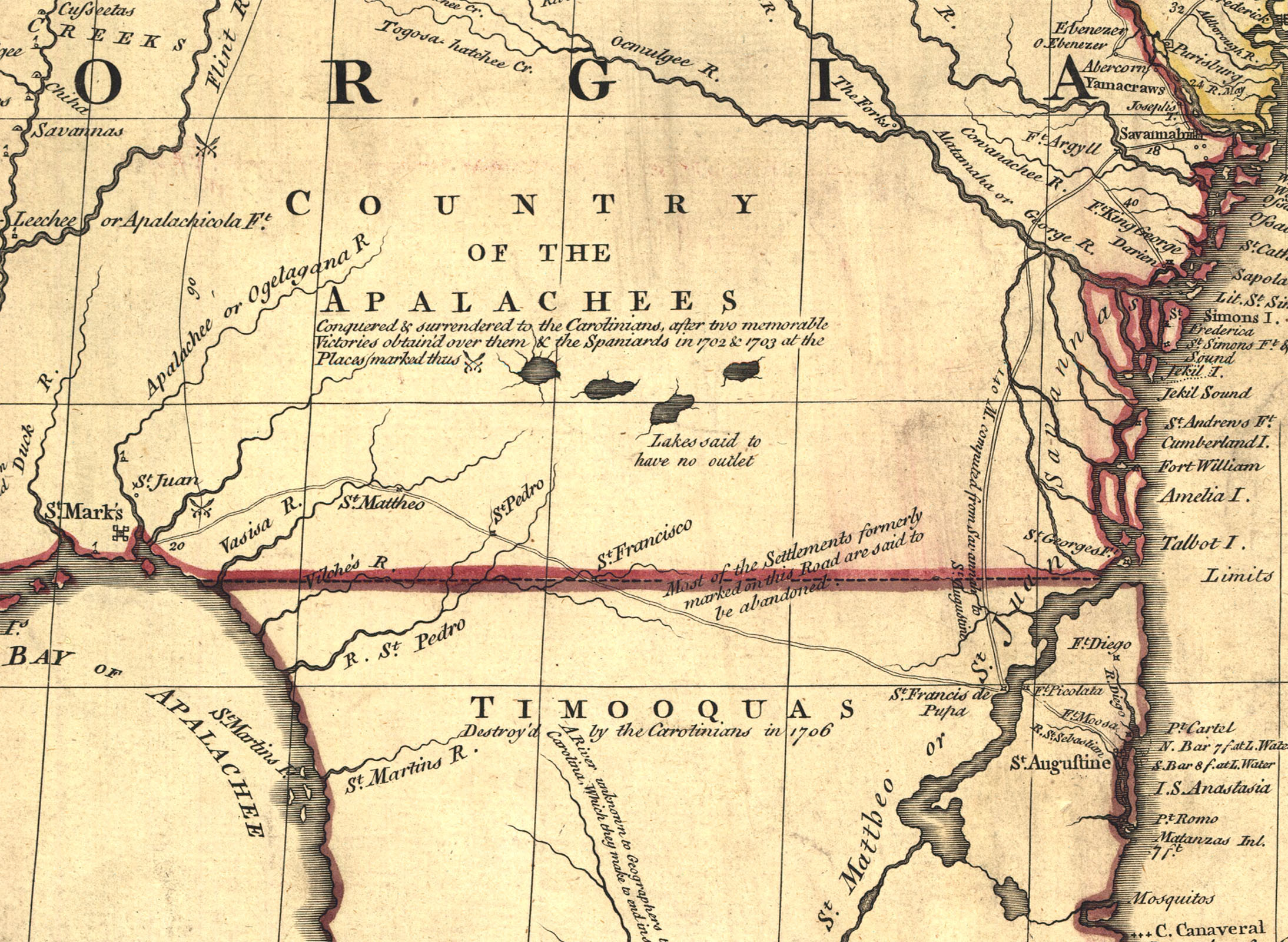
The Mitchell Map, excerpt showing border of Georgia and Florida; the line is placed significantly further south than Spanish claims.

The map is very large and the notes are often very small, making it difficult to view online. Reduced scale copies result in unreadable notes. The following list gives a few examples of the kind of notes found on the map, with Mitchell's spelling:

- The region of today's central Tennessee and Kentucky (between the Tennessee and Cumberland Rivers): A Fine Level Fertile Country of great Extent, by Accounts of the Indians and our People
- In the area between the Mississippi River and the Tennessee River: This Country of the Cherokees which extends Westward to the Mississippi and Northward to the Confines of the Six Nations was formally surrendered to the Crown of Britain at Westminster 1729
- In the Great Plains: The Nadouessoians are reckoned one of the most Populous Nations of Indians in North America, altho' the number and situation of their Villages are not known nor laid down. (Reference to the Sioux)
- Along the coast of the Gulf of Mexico, present-day Texas: Wandering Savage Indians
- Southwest of Hudson Bay: The long and Barbarous Names lately given to some of these Northern Parts of Canada and the Lakes we have not inserted, as they are of no use, and uncertain Authority.
- North of Lake Huron: MESSESAGUES—Subdued by the Iroquois and now united with them making the 8th Nation in that League. (reference to the Mississaugas)
- Missouri River: Missouri River is reckoned to run Westward to the Mountains of New Mexico, as far as the Ohio does Eastward
- Present-day Iowa: Extensive Meadows full of Buffaloes
- Sandusky, Ohio: Sandoski—Canahogue—The seat of War, the Mart of Trade, & chief Hunting Grounds of the Six Nations, on the Lakes & the Ohio.
- Central Pennsylvania, north of present-day Harrisburg: St. Anthony's Wilderness
- Illinois region: The Antient Eriez were extirpated by the Iroquois upwards of 100 years ago, ever since which time they have been in Possession of L. Erie (reference to the Erie people)
- Along Illinois River and overland to the south end of Lake Michigan: Western Bounds of the Six Nations sold and Surrendered to Great Britain
- Illinois region: The Six Nations have extended their Territories to the River Illinois, ever since the Year 1672, when they subdued, and were incorporated with, the Antient Chaouanons, the Native Proprietors of these Countries, and the River Ohio. Besides which they likewise claim a Right of Conquest over the Illinois, and all the Mississippi as far as they extend. This is confirmed by their own Claims and Possessions in 1742, which include all the Bounds here laid down, and none have ever thought fit to dispute them. (reference to the Illiniwek)
- Just below the previous note: The Ohio Indians are a mixt Tribe of the Several Indians of our Colonies, settled here under the Six Nations, who have always been in Alliance and Subjection to the English. The most numerous of them are the Delaware and Shawnoes, who are Natives of Delaware River. Those about Philadelphia were called Sauwanoos whom we now call Shawanoes, or Shawnoes. The Mohickans and Minquaas were the Antient Inhabitants of Susquehanna R. (reference to the Lenape, Shawnee, and Susquehannock Indians)
- Southeast Missouri area: Mines of Marameg, which gave rise to the famous Mississippi Scheme 1719.
- North Florida: TIMOOQUA—Destroy'd by the Carolinians in 1706 (reference to the Timucua)
- South Georgia: COUNTRY OF THE APALACHEES—Conquered & surrendered to the Carolinians, after two memorable Victories obtain'd over them & the Spaniards in 1702 & 1703 at the Places marked thus [crossed-swords] (reference to the Apalachee)
- Alabama area: The English have Factories & Settlements in all the Towns of the Creek Indians of any note, except Albamas; which was usurped by the French in 1715 but established by the English 28 years before. (reference to the Creek people)
- Yazoo River: River of the Yasous—The Indians on this River were in Alliance with the English, for which they have been destroyed by the French (reference to the Yazoo tribe)

Many geographic features are labeled with names no longer in use or oddly spelled, including:

- Des Moines River: Moingona River
- Kanawha and New River together: Gr. Conhaway called Wood R. or New R.
- Kentucky River: Cuttawa or Catawba R.
- Clinch River: Pelisipi River (a tributary is labeled Clinch's R.)
- Tennessee River: River of the Cherakees, or Hogohegee R. Upstream another label says River Hogohegee or Callamaco
- French Broad River: Agiqua R.
- Little Tennessee River: Tannaſsee or Satico R.
- Hiwassee River: Euphasee
- Ohio River: Ohio or Splawacipiki R.
- Altamaha River: Alatamaha or George R.
- Minnesota River: Ouadebameniſsouté or R. St. Peter (reflecting the Dakota name Watpá Mnísota and the French name Rivière de St. Pierre)
- Muskegon River: Maticon R.
- Potomac River: Potowmack River

The map also included non-existent features, such as Isle Phelipeaux in Lake Superior, found in earlier maps by Jacques-Nicolas Bellin.

== Use in the 1783 Treaty of Paris and in the Northwest Ordinance ==
The Mitchell Map remained the most detailed map of North America available in the later eighteenth century. Various impressions (and also French copies) were used to establish the boundaries of the new United States of America by diplomats at the 1783 Treaty of Paris that ended the American Revolutionary War. The map's inaccuracies subsequently led to a number of border disputes, such as in New Brunswick and Maine. Its supposition that the Mississippi River extended north to the 50th parallel (into British territory) resulted in the treaty using it as a landmark for a geographically impossible definition of the border in that region. It was not until 1842, when the Webster–Ashburton Treaty resolved these inconsistencies with fixes such as the one that created Minnesota's Northwest Angle, that the border between British North America and the United States was clearly drawn from the Atlantic Ocean to the Oregon Country.

Similarly, during the drafting of the Northwest Ordinance, the map's inaccuracy in depicting where an east–west line drawn through the southernmost point of Lake Michigan would intersect Lake Erie led to a long dispute over the Ohio–Michigan border that culminated in the Toledo War.
