= List of Nova Scotia by-elections =

Canadian provincial by-elections

The list of Nova Scotia by-elections includes every by-election held in the Canadian province of Nova Scotia. By-elections occur whenever there is a vacancy in the House of Assembly, although an imminent general election may allow the vacancy to remain until the dissolution of parliament. Between 1840 and 1927 incumbent members were required to recontest their seats upon being appointed to Cabinet. These Ministerial by-elections were almost always uncontested.

== 65th General Assembly of Nova Scotia 2024- ==
By-election	Date	Incumbent	Party	Winner	Party	Cause	Retained
Chéticamp-Margarees-Pleasant Bay	June 23, 2026	None	None	Claude Bourgeois	Progressive Conservative	Creation of new district	New district

== 64th General Assembly of Nova Scotia 2021–2024 ==
By-election	Date	Incumbent	Party	Winner	Party	Cause	Retained
Pictou West	May 21, 2024	Karla MacFarlane	Progressive Conservative	Marco MacLeod	Progressive Conservative	Resignation	Yes
Preston	August 8, 2023	Angela Simmonds	Liberal	Twila Grosse	Progressive Conservative	Resignation	No

== 63rd General Assembly of Nova Scotia 2017–2021 ==
By-election	Date	Incumbent	Party	Winner	Party	Cause	Retained
Cape Breton Centre	March 10, 2020	Tammy Martin	New Democratic	Kendra Coombes	New Democratic	Resigned due to ongoing health issues.	Yes
Truro-Bible Hill-Millbrook-Salmon River	March 10, 2020	Lenore Zann	New Democratic	Dave Ritcey	Progressive Conservative	Resigned to run federally in Cumberland-Colchester as a Liberal; elected. Completed final months as an independent MHA.	No
Sydney River-Mira-Louisbourg	September 3, 2019	Alfie MacLeod	Progressive Conservative	Brian Comer	Progressive Conservative	Resigned to run federally in Cape Breton—Canso; defeated.	Yes
Northside-Westmount	September 3, 2019	Eddie Orrell	Progressive Conservative	Murray Ryan	Progressive Conservative	Resigned to run federally in Sydney—Victoria; defeated.	Yes
Argyle-Barrington	September 3, 2019	Chris d'Entremont	Progressive Conservative	Colton LeBlanc	Progressive Conservative	Resigned to run federally in West Nova; elected.	Yes
Sackville-Cobequid	June 18, 2019	Dave Wilson	New Democratic	Steve Craig	Progressive Conservative	Resignation	No
Cumberland South	June 19, 2018	Jamie Baillie	Progressive Conservative	Tory Rushton	Progressive Conservative	Resigned amid an allegation of harassment.	Yes

== 62nd General Assembly of Nova Scotia 2013–2017 ==
By-election	Date	Incumbent	Party	Winner	Party	Cause	Retained
Halifax Needham	August 30, 2016	Maureen MacDonald	New Democratic	Lisa Roberts	New Democratic	Resignation	Yes
Sydney-Whitney Pier	July 14, 2015	Gordie Gosse	New Democratic	Derek Mombourquette	Liberal	Resignation	No
Dartmouth South	July 14, 2015	Allan Rowe	Liberal	Marian Mancini	New Democratic	Death	No
Cape Breton Centre	July 14, 2015	Frank Corbett	New Democratic	David Wilton	Liberal	Resignation	No

== 61st General Assembly of Nova Scotia 2009–2013 ==
By-election	Date	Incumbent	Party	Winner	Party	Cause	Retained
Cape Breton North	June 21, 2011	Cecil Clarke	Progressive Conservative	Eddie Orrell	Progressive Conservative	Resignation to contest the 2011 Federal Election	Yes
Cumberland South	October 26, 2010	Murray Scott	Progressive Conservative	Jamie Baillie	Progressive Conservative	Resignation	Yes
Yarmouth	June 22, 2010	Richard Hurlburt	Progressive Conservative	Zach Churchill	Liberal	Resignation due to a constituency expense scandal	No
Glace Bay	June 22, 2010	David Wilson	Liberal	Geoff MacLellan	Liberal	Resignation	Yes
Inverness	October 20, 2009	Rodney MacDonald	Progressive Conservative	Allan MacMaster	Progressive Conservative	Resignation	Yes
Antigonish	October 20, 2009	Angus MacIsaac	Progressive Conservative	Maurice Smith	New Democratic	Resignation	No

== 60th General Assembly of Nova Scotia 2006–2009 ==
By-election	Date	Incumbent	Party	Winner	Party	Cause	Retained
Cole Harbour-Eastern Passage	October 2, 2007	Kevin Deveaux	New Democratic	Becky Kent	New Democratic	Resignation	Yes

== 59th General Assembly of Nova Scotia 2003–2006 ==
By-election	Date	Incumbent	Party	Winner	Party	Cause	Retained
Chester-St. Margaret's	June 12, 2005	John Chataway	Progressive Conservative	Judy Streatch	Progressive Conservative	Death	Yes

== 58th General Assembly of Nova Scotia 1999–2003 ==
By-election	Date	Incumbent	Party	Winner	Party	Cause	Retained
Halifax Fairview	March 6, 2001	Eileen O'Connell	New Democratic	Graham Steele	New Democratic	Death	Yes
Cape Breton North	March 6, 2001	Russell MacLellan	Liberal	Cecil Clarke	Progressive Conservative	Resignation	No
Cape Breton East	April 4, 2000	David Wilson	Liberal	David Wilson	Liberal	Void Election	Yes

== 57th General Assembly of Nova Scotia 1998–1999 ==
no by-elections

== 56th General Assembly of Nova Scotia 1993–1998 ==
By-election	Date	Incumbent	Party	Winner	Party	Cause	Retained
Halifax Citadel	November 4, 1997	Terry Donahoe	Progressive Conservative	Ed Kinley	Liberal	Resignation to contest the 1997 Federal Election	No
Cumberland North	November 4, 1997	Ross Bragg	Liberal	Ernie Fage	Progressive Conservative	Death	No
Cape Breton The Lakes	November 4, 1997	Bernie Boudreau	Liberal	Helen MacDonald	New Democratic	Resignation	No
Cape Breton North	November 4, 1997	Ron Stewart	Liberal	Russell MacLellan	Liberal	Resignation	Yes
Halifax Fairview	June 4, 1996	Alexa McDonough	New Democratic	Eileen O'Connell	New Democratic	Resignation upon election as Leader of the Federal NDP	Yes
Cape Breton West	October 10, 1995	Russell MacKinnon	Liberal	Alfie MacLeod	Progressive Conservative	Resignation to enter municipal politics	No
Colchester-Musquodoboit Valley	November 2, 1993	Ken Streatch	Progressive Conservative	Brooke Taylor	Progressive Conservative	Resignation to contest the 1993 Federal Election	Yes
Pictou East	August 3, 1993	Donald W. Cameron	Progressive Conservative	Wayne Fraser	Liberal	Resignation	No

== 55th General Assembly of Nova Scotia 1988–1993 ==
By-election	Date	Incumbent	Party	Winner	Party	Cause	Retained
Halifax Atlantic	August 27, 1991	John Buchanan	Progressive Conservative	Robert Chisholm	New Democratic	Appointed to the Senate	No
Cape Breton Centre	August 28, 1990	Russell MacNeil	Liberal	Russell MacNeil	Liberal	Void Election	Yes
Cape Breton Centre	August 22, 1989	Wayne Connors	Liberal	Russell MacNeil	Liberal	Resignation	Yes

== 54th General Assembly of Nova Scotia 1984–1988 ==
By-election	Date	Incumbent	Party	Winner	Party	Cause	Retained
Inverness South	February 24, 1987	Billy Joe MacLean	Progressive Conservative	Billy Joe MacLean	Independent	Expelled after pleading guilty to submitting forged documents.	No

== 53rd General Assembly of Nova Scotia 1981–1984 ==
By-election	Date	Incumbent	Party	Winner	Party	Cause	Retained
Lunenburg Centre	June 5, 1984	Bruce Cochran	Progressive Conservative	Maxine Cochran	Progressive Conservative	Death	Yes
Kings South	February 12, 1984	Harry How	Progressive Conservative	Paul Kinsman	Progressive Conservative	Resignation	Yes
Cape Breton The Lakes	February 22, 1983	Ossie Fraser	Liberal	John Newell	Progressive Conservative	Death	No

== 52nd General Assembly of Nova Scotia 1978–1981 ==
By-election	Date	Incumbent	Party	Winner	Party	Cause	Retained
Cape Breton East	December 2, 1980	Jeremy Akerman	New Democratic	Donnie MacLeod	Progressive Conservative	Resignation to become Executive Director of Intergovernmental Affairs	No
Victoria	May 6, 1980	Peter John Nicholson	Liberal	Fisher Hudson	Progressive Conservative	Resignation	No
Richmond	May 6, 1980	Gaston T. LeBlanc	Liberal	John E. LeBrun	Liberal	Death	Yes
Halifax Needham	May 6, 1980	Gerald Regan	Liberal	Edmund L. Morris	Progressive Conservative	Resignation to contest the 1980 Federal Election	No

== 51st General Assembly of Nova Scotia 1974–1978 ==
By-election	Date	Incumbent	Party	Winner	Party	Cause	Retained
Pictou Centre	September 6, 1977	Fraser MacLean	Progressive Conservative	Jack MacIsaac	Progressive Conservative	Resignation	Yes
Cape Breton West	September 7, 1976	Allan Sullivan	Liberal	Ossie Fraser	Liberal	Appointed a judge	Yes

== 50th General Assembly of Nova Scotia 1970–1974 ==
By-election	Date	Incumbent	Party	Winner	Party	Cause	Retained
Guysborough	June 5, 1973	Angus MacIsaac	Progressive Conservative	Sandy Cameron	Liberal	Resignation to contest the 1972 Federal Election	No
Queens	November 16, 1971	W. S. Kennedy Jones	Progressive Conservative	Floyd MacDonald	Progressive Conservative	Resignation	Yes
Kings West	November 16, 1971	Gordon Tidman	Progressive Conservative	Frank Bezanson	Liberal	Void Election	No

== 49th General Assembly of Nova Scotia 1967–1970 ==
By-election	Date	Incumbent	Party	Winner	Party	Cause	Retained
Halifax Eastern Shore	February 11, 1969	Duncan MacMillan	Liberal	Alexander Garnet Brown	Liberal	Death	Yes
Guysborough	February 11, 1969	Alexander MacIsaac	Progressive Conservative	Angus MacIsaac	Progressive Conservative	Death	Yes
Dartmouth North	November 26, 1968	Gordon L. S. Hart	Liberal	Gerald G. Wambolt	Progressive Conservative	Appointed a judge	No
Cumberland Centre	November 26, 1968	Stephen T. Pyke	Progressive Conservative	Raymond M. Smith	Progressive Conservative	Resignation	Yes
Colchester	February 13, 1968	Robert Stanfield	Progressive Conservative	Gerald Ritcey	Progressive Conservative	Resignation upon election as Leader of the federal Progressive Conservatives	Yes

== 48th General Assembly of Nova Scotia 1963–1967 ==
no by-elections

== 47th General Assembly of Nova Scotia 1960–1963 ==
By-election	Date	Incumbent	Party	Winner	Party	Cause	Retained
Inverness	September 11, 1962	Roderick MacLean	Liberal	William N. MacLean	Liberal	Death	Yes
Hants East	September 11, 1962	Ernest M. Ettinger	Progressive Conservative	Albert J. Ettinger	Progressive Conservative	Death	Yes

== 46th General Assembly of Nova Scotia 1956–1960 ==
By-election	Date	Incumbent	Party	Winner	Party	Cause	Retained
Lunenburg East	October 14, 1959	R. Clifford Levy	Progressive Conservative	Maurice L. Zinck	Progressive Conservative	Death	Yes

== 45th General Assembly of Nova Scotia 1953–1956 ==
By-election	Date	Incumbent	Party	Winner	Party	Cause	Retained
Inverness	November 14, 1954	Alexander H. McKinnon	Liberal	Joseph Clyde Nunn	Liberal	Appointed a judge	Yes
Hants East	November 14, 1954	Alfred E. Reid	Liberal	Alfred E. Reid	Liberal	Void Election	Yes
Halifax South	November 14, 1954	Angus Lewis Macdonald	Liberal	Richard Donahoe	Progressive Conservative	Death	No

== 44th General Assembly of Nova Scotia 1949–1953 ==
By-election	Date	Incumbent	Party	Winner	Party	Cause	Retained
Hants West	November 27, 1950	George B. Cole	Liberal	George Henry Wilson	Progressive Conservative	Void Election	No
Richmond	December 20, 1949	Lauchlin Daniel Currie	Liberal	Earl Wallace Urquhart	Liberal	Appointed a judge	Yes

== 43rd General Assembly of Nova Scotia 1945–1949 ==
no by-elections

== 42nd General Assembly of Nova Scotia 1941–1945 ==
By-election	Date	Incumbent	Party	Winner	Party	Cause	Retained
Antigonish	October 19, 1942	John A. MacIsaac	Liberal	John P. Gorman	Liberal	Death	Yes
Richmond	December 15, 1941†	Donald David Boyd	Liberal	Lauchlin Daniel Currie	Liberal	Appointed to the Department of Mines and Labour	Yes

† Won by acclamation

== 41st General Assembly of Nova Scotia 1937–1941 ==
By-election	Date	Incumbent	Party	Winner	Party	Cause	Retained
Inverness	October 28, 1940†	Moses Elijah McGarry	Liberal	Alexander H. McKinnon	Liberal	Resignation to contest the 1940 Federal Election	Yes
Halifax West	October 28, 1940†	George E. Hagen	Liberal	George E. Hagen	Liberal	Resigned seat intending to retire but decided to run again	Yes
Halifax South	October 28, 1940†	Angus Lewis Macdonald	Liberal	Joseph R. Murphy	Liberal	Appointed to the federal cabinet	Yes
Cumberland	October 28, 1940†	Percy Chapman Black	Conservative	Leonard William Fraser	Conservative	Resignation to contest the 1940 Federal Election	Yes
Colchester	October 28, 1940†	George Y. Thomas	Conservative	George Scott Dickey	Conservative	Death	Yes
Halifax Centre	December 5, 1939†	William Duff Forrest	Liberal	James Edward Rutledge	Liberal	Death	Yes
Cape Breton Centre	December 5, 1939	Michael Dwyer	Liberal	Douglas MacDonald	Cooperative Commonwealth	Resignation to become President and General Manager of the Nova Scotia Steel and Coal Company	No
Yarmouth	November 29, 1938†	Lindsay C. Gardner	Liberal	Henry A. Waterman	Liberal	Death	Yes

† Won by acclamation

== 40th General Assembly of Nova Scotia 1933–1937 ==
By-election	Date	Incumbent	Party	Winner	Party	Cause	Retained
Halifax North	March 2, 1936	Gordon Benjamin Isnor	Liberal	Harold Connolly	Liberal	Resignation to contest the 1935 Federal Election	Yes

== 39th General Assembly of Nova Scotia 1928–1933 ==
By-election	Date	Incumbent	Party	Winner	Party	Cause	Retained
Halifax	January 21, 1930	John Francis Mahoney	Conservative	George H. Murphy	Conservative	Death	Yes

== 38th General Assembly of Nova Scotia 1925–1928 ==
By-election	Date	Incumbent	Party	Winner	Party	Cause	Retained
Queens	August 30, 1926†	William Lorimer Hall	Conservative	William Lorimer Hall	Conservative	Sought re-election upon appointment as Attorney General	Yes
Richmond and Cape Breton West	February 24, 1926†	John Alexander Macdonald	Conservative	John Angus Stewart	Conservative	Resignation to contest the 1925 Federal Election	Yes
Hants	August 1, 1925†	Edgar Nelson Rhodes	Conservative	Edgar Nelson Rhodes	Conservative	Sought re-election upon appointment as Premier and Provincial Secretary	Yes
Halifax	August 1, 1925†	John Archibald Walker	Conservative	John Archibald Walker	Conservative	Sought re-election upon appointment as Minister of Natural Resources and Provincial Development	Yes
Cumberland	August 1, 1925†	Percy Chapman Black	Conservative	Percy Chapman Black	Conservative	Sought re-election upon appointment as Minister of Highways	Yes
Cape Breton East	August 1, 1925†	John Carey Douglas	Conservative	John Carey Douglas	Conservative	Sought re-election upon appointment as Attorney General	Yes
Cape Breton Centre	August 1, 1925†	Gordon Sidney Harrington	Conservative	Gordon Sidney Harrington	Conservative	Sought re-election upon appointment as Minister of Public Works and Mines	Yes

† Won by acclamation

== 37th General Assembly of Nova Scotia 1920–1925 ==
By-election	Date	Incumbent	Party	Winner	Party	Cause	Retained
Victoria	March 1, 1923†	George Henry Murray	Liberal	Daniel Alexander Cameron	Liberal	Resignation	Yes
Kings	January 16, 1923†	Harry H. Wickwire	Liberal	James Sealy	Liberal	Death	Yes
Halifax	January 16, 1923†	Robert Emmett Finn	Liberal	Walter Joseph O'Hearn	Liberal	Resignation to contest a federal by-election	Yes
Antigonish	January 16, 1923†	William Chisholm	Liberal	William Chisholm	Liberal	Sought re-election upon appointment as Minister of Highways	Yes
Shelburne	September 2, 1920	Frank E. Smith	Liberal	Ernest Howard Armstrong	Liberal	Resignation to provide a seat for Armstrong	Yes

† Won by acclamation

== 36th General Assembly of Nova Scotia 1916–1920 ==
By-election	Date	Incumbent	Party	Winner	Party	Cause	Retained
Kings	July 3, 1918†	Harry H. Wickwire	Liberal	Harry H. Wickwire	Liberal	Sought re-election upon appointment as Minister of Highways	Yes

† Won by acclamation

== 35th General Assembly of Nova Scotia 1911–1916 ==
By-election	Date	Incumbent	Party	Winner	Party	Cause	Retained
Victoria	February 14, 1914	Angus A. Buchanan	Liberal	Phillip McLeod	Conservative	Death (Results voided November 17, 1914. No by-election held)	No
Antigonish	January 16, 1913	Edward Lavin Girroir	Conservative	John Stanfield O'Brien	Conservative	Appointed to the Senate	Yes
Lunenburg	November 15, 1911	Alexander Kenneth Maclean	Liberal	Alfred Clairmonte Zwicker	Conservative	Resignation to contest the 1911 Federal Election	No
Digby	November 15, 1911	Allen Ellsworth Wall	Liberal	Harry Hatheway Marshall	Conservative	Resignation to contest the 1911 Federal Election	No
Annapolis	November 8, 1911†	Orlando Daniels	Liberal	Orlando Daniels	Liberal	Sought re-election upon appointment as Attorney General	Yes
Yarmouth	August 16, 1911	Ernest Howard Armstrong	Liberal	Ernest Howard Armstrong	Liberal	Sought re-election upon appointment as Commissioner of Public Works and Mines	Yes

† Won by acclamation

== 34th General Assembly of Nova Scotia 1906–1911 ==
By-election	Date	Incumbent	Party	Winner	Party	Cause	Retained
Kings	January 31, 1911†	Brenton Dodge	Liberal	Harry H. Wickwire	Liberal	Death	Yes
Digby	November 15, 1910	Angus Morrison Gidney	Liberal	Allen Ellsworth Wall	Liberal	Appointed Collector of Customs	Yes
Queens	February 16, 1910	Edward Matthew Farrell	Liberal	William Lorimer Hall	Conservative	Appointed to the Senate	No
Lunenburg	November 24, 1909	Henry March	Liberal	Alexander Kenneth Maclean	Liberal	Resignation	Yes
Hants	November 24, 1909	Charles Smith Wilcox	Conservative	Albert Parsons	Conservative	Death	Yes
Cumberland	November 24, 1909	William Thomas Pipes	Liberal	Joshua H. Livingston	Liberal	Death	Yes
Victoria	November 17, 1909†	John Gillis Morrison	Liberal	Angus A. Buchanan	Liberal	Resignation	Yes
Pictou	February 16, 1909	Charles Elliott Tanner	Conservative	Robert Hugh MacKay	Liberal	Resignation to contest the 1908 Federal Election	No
Hants	July 17, 1907	Arthur Drysdale	Liberal	James O'Brien	Liberal	Appointed a judge	Yes
Antigonish	April 9, 1907†	Christopher P. Chisholm	Liberal	Christopher P. Chisholm	Liberal	Sought re-election upon appointment as Commissioner of Public Works and Mines	Yes
Digby	February 19, 1907†	Ambrose H. Comeau	Liberal	Joseph Willie Comeau	Liberal	Appointed to the Senate	Yes

† Won by acclamation

== 33rd General Assembly of Nova Scotia 1901–1906 ==
By-election	Date	Incumbent	Party	Winner	Party	Cause	Retained
Annapolis	March 6, 1906	James Wilberforce Longley	Liberal	Orlando Daniels	Liberal	Appointed a judge	Yes
Richmond	December 15, 1904	Duncan Finlayson	Liberal	Charles P. Bissett	Liberal	Resignation to contest the 1904 Federal Election	Yes
Pictou	December 15, 1904	Edward Mortimer Macdonald	Liberal	Robert M. McGregor	Liberal	Resignation to contest the 1904 Federal Election	Yes
Cumberland	December 15, 1904	Thomas Reuben Black	Liberal	Elisha B. Paul	Liberal	Appointed to the Senate	Yes
Colchester	December 15, 1904	Frederick Andrew Laurence	Liberal	Henry T. Laurence	Liberal	Resignation to contest the 1904 Federal Election	Yes
Cape Breton	December 15, 1904	Daniel Duncan McKenzie	Liberal	Arthur Samuel Kendall	Liberal	Resignation to contest the 1904 Federal Election	Yes
Lunenburg	December 8, 1904†	Alexander Kenneth Maclean	Liberal	Charles Uniacke Mader	Liberal	Resignation to contest the 1904 Federal Election	Yes
Guysborough	December 8, 1904†	John Howard Sinclair	Liberal	James F. Ellis	Liberal	Resignation to contest the 1904 Federal Election	Yes
Shelburne	January 12, 1904	Thomas Johnston	Liberal	George A. Cox	Liberal	Death	Yes
Yarmouth	January 5, 1904†	Augustus Stoneman	Liberal	George P. Sanderson	Liberal	Resignation to be appointed to the Legislative Council	Yes
Antigonish	January 22, 1903†	Angus McGillivray	Liberal	Fred Robert Trotter	Liberal	Appointed a judge	Yes
Shelburne	December 10, 1902	Thomas Robertson	Liberal	Moses H. Nickerson	Liberal	Death	Yes
Lunenburg	December 3, 1902†	Edward Doran Davison	Liberal	John Drew Sperry	Liberal	Death	Yes

† Won by acclamation

== 32nd General Assembly of Nova Scotia 1897–1901 ==
By-election	Date	Incumbent	Party	Winner	Party	Cause	Retained
Halifax	December 12, 1900	William Bernard Wallace	Liberal	Michael Edwin Keefe	Liberal	Resignation to contest the 1900 Federal Election	Yes
Cape Breton	December 12, 1900	Arthur Samuel Kendall	Liberal	Neil J. Gillis	Liberal	Resignation to contest the 1900 Federal Election	Yes
Cape Breton	December 12, 1900	Alexander Johnston	Liberal	Daniel Duncan McKenzie	Liberal	Resignation to contest the 1900 Federal Election	Yes
Pictou	December 5, 1900†	Edward Mortimer Macdonald	Liberal	Edward Mortimer Macdonald	Liberal	Resignation to contest the 1900 Federal Election	Yes
Pictou	December 5, 1900†	J.D. McGregor	Liberal	Charles Elliott Tanner	Conservative	Resignation to contest the 1900 Federal Election	No
Yarmouth	May 15, 1900†	William Law	Liberal	Augustus Stoneman	Liberal	Appointed to the Legislative Council	Yes

† Won by acclamation

== 31st General Assembly of Nova Scotia 1894–1897 ==
By-election	Date	Incumbent	Party	Winner	Party	Cause	Retained
Victoria	August 15, 1896†	John Lemuel Bethune	Conservative	George Henry Murray	Liberal	Resignation to contest the 1896 Federal Election	No
Queens	August 15, 1896†	Albert M. Hemeon	Liberal	Edward Matthew Farrell	Liberal	Death	Yes
Lunenburg	August 15, 1896	John Drew Sperry	Liberal	Allan Moreash	Liberal	Resignation to contest the 1896 Federal Election	Yes
Halifax	August 15, 1896†	William Stevens Fielding	Liberal	William Bernard Wallace	Liberal	Resignation to contest a federal by-election	Yes
Colchester	August 15, 1896	Wilbert David Dimock	Conservative	Firman McClure	Liberal	Resignation to contest the 1896 Federal Election	No
Annapolis	August 15, 1896†	James Wilberforce Longley	Liberal	James Wilberforce Longley	Liberal	Resignation to contest the 1896 Federal Election	Yes
Digby	September 28, 1895	Eliakim Tupper	Liberal	Angus Morrison Gidney	Liberal	Death	Yes
Antigonish	June 13, 1895	Colin Francis McIsaac	Liberal	Angus McGillivray	Liberal	Resignation to contest a federal by-election	Yes
Colchester	January 30, 1895†	Wilbert David Dimock	Conservative	Wilbert David Dimock	Conservative	Resignation to recontest due to election petition	Yes
Richmond	December 27, 1894	John Morrison	Conservative	Joseph Matheson	Liberal	Void Election	No

† Won by acclamation

== 30th General Assembly of Nova Scotia 1890–1894 ==
By-election	Date	Incumbent	Party	Winner	Party	Cause	Retained
Annapolis	June 8, 1892	Henry H. Chute	Liberal	Henry M. Munro	Liberal	Death	Yes
Hants	March 5, 1891	Allen Haley	Liberal	Arthur Drysdale	Liberal	Resignation to contest the 1891 Federal Election	Yes
Cape Breton	March 5, 1891	Joseph McPherson	Liberal	Joseph McPherson	Liberal	Resignation to contest the 1891 Federal Election	Yes
Antigonish	March 5, 1891	Angus McGillivray	Liberal	Christopher P. Chisholm	Liberal	Resignation to contest the 1891 Federal Election	Yes
Yarmouth	December 11, 1890	Albert Gayton	Liberal	Forman Hatfield	Liberal	Appointed Registrar of Deeds	Yes

== 29th General Assembly of Nova Scotia 1886–1890 ==
By-election	Date	Incumbent	Party	Winner	Party	Cause	Retained
Lunenburg	January 16, 1889†	George A. Ross	Liberal	John Drew Sperry	Liberal	Death	Yes
Digby	October 25, 1887	Henri M. Robicheau	Liberal	Henri M. Robicheau	Liberal	Resignation to contest a federal by-election	Yes
Queens	March 8, 1887	Jason M. Mack	Liberal	Albert M. Hemeon	Liberal	Resignation to contest the 1887 Federal Election	Yes
Pictou	March 8, 1887†	Adam Carr Bell	Conservative	William Cameron	Conservative	Resignation to contest the 1887 Federal Election	Yes
Antigonish	March 8, 1887†	Angus McGillivray	Liberal	Angus McGillivray	Liberal	Resignation to contest the 1887 Federal Election	Yes

† Won by acclamation

== 28th General Assembly of Nova Scotia 1882–1886 ==
By-election	Date	Incumbent	Party	Winner	Party	Cause	Retained
Halifax	August 20, 1884	William Stevens Fielding	Liberal	William Stevens Fielding	Liberal	Sought re-election upon appointment as Premier and Provincial Secretary	Yes
Cumberland	July 2, 1884†	Charles James Townshend	Conservative	Thomas Reuben Black	Liberal	Resignation to contest a federal by-election	No
Inverness	January 11, 1883	Duncan J. Campbell	Liberal	Angus MacLennan	Conservative	Death	No
Cape Breton	August 29, 1882	Alonza J. White	Liberal	Alonza J. White	Liberal	Sought re-election upon appointment as Attorney General	Yes
Antigonish	August 29, 1882	John Sparrow David Thompson	Conservative	Charles B. Whidden	Conservative	Appointed a judge	Yes
Yarmouth	August 22, 1882†	Albert Gayton	Liberal	Albert Gayton	Liberal	Sought re-election upon appointment as Commissioner of Public Works and Mines	Yes
Lunenburg	August 22, 1882†	Charles Edward Church	Liberal	Charles Edward Church	Liberal	Sought re-election upon appointment as Provincial Secretary	Yes

† Won by acclamation

== 27th General Assembly of Nova Scotia 1878–1882 ==
By-election	Date	Incumbent	Party	Winner	Party	Cause	Retained
Halifax	November 25, 1879	Charles James MacDonald	Conservative	John Fitzwilliam Stairs	Conservative	Appointed a Post Office Inspector	Yes
Pictou	November 11, 1878†	Simon Hugh Holmes	Conservative	Simon Hugh Holmes	Conservative	Sought re-election upon appointment as Premier and Provincial Secretary	Yes
Antigonish	November 11, 1878†	John Sparrow David Thompson	Conservative	John Sparrow David Thompson	Conservative	Sought re-election upon appointment as Attorney General	Yes

† Won by acclamation

== 26th General Assembly of Nova Scotia 1874–1878 ==
By-election	Date	Incumbent	Party	Winner	Party	Cause	Retained
Shelburne	March 1, 1878	Robert Robertson	Liberal	Nathaniel Whitworth White	Conservative	Resignation	No
Yarmouth	January 10, 1878†	Albert Gayton	Liberal	Albert Gayton	Liberal	Sought re-election upon appointment as Commissioner of Public Works and Mines	Yes
Antigonish	December 4, 1877	John J. McKinnon	Conservative	John Sparrow David Thompson	Conservative	Resignation	Yes
Lunenburg	September 27, 1876	Mather Byles DesBrisay	Liberal	Charles Henry Davison	Liberal	Appointed a judge	Yes
Guysborough	December 20, 1875	William Henry Wylde	Liberal	Otto Schwartz Weeks	Liberal	Resignation	Yes
Shelburne	January 21, 1875†	Robert Robertson	Liberal	Robert Robertson	Liberal	Sought re-election upon appointment as Commissioner of Public Works and Mines	Yes

† Won by acclamation

== 25th General Assembly of Nova Scotia 1871–1874 ==
By-election	Date	Incumbent	Party	Winner	Party	Cause	Retained
Hants	March 10, 1874	William McDougall	Conservative	Henry Yeomans	Liberal	Resignation	No
Cape Breton	March 10, 1874†	Alonza J. White	Liberal	Alonza J. White	Liberal	Sought re-election upon appointment as Commissioner of Crown Lands	Yes
Richmond	March 4, 1874	Edmund Power Flynn	Liberal	Charles Boudroit	Liberal	Resignation to contest the 1874 Federal Election	Yes
Hants	March 4, 1874	William Henry Allison	Conservative	Thomas Barlow Smith	Liberal	Resignation to contest the 1874 Federal Election	No
Guysborough	March 4, 1874	John Angus Kirk	Liberal	Charles M. Franchville	Liberal	Resignation to contest the 1874 Federal Election	Yes
Victoria	October 23, 1873	Charles James Campbell	Conservative	David McCurdy	Liberal	Appointed to the Legislative Council	No
Halifax	February 18, 1873	William Garvie	Liberal	John Taylor	Liberal	Death	Yes
Antigonish	February 11, 1873†	Daniel MacDonald	Liberal	Daniel MacDonald	Liberal	Sought re-election upon appointment as Commissioner of Public Works and Mines	Yes
Yarmouth	October 16, 1872	William H. Townsend	Liberal	John K. Ryerson	Liberal	Resignation	Yes
Pictou	October 16, 1872	James McDonald	Conservative	Alexander MacKay	Conservative	Resignation to contest the 1872 Federal Election	Yes
Inverness	October 16, 1872	Samuel McDonnell	Conservative	Duncan J. Campbell	Conservative	Resignation to contest the 1872 Federal Election	Yes

† Won by acclamation

== 24th General Assembly of Nova Scotia 1867–1871 ==
By-election	Date	Incumbent	Party	Winner	Party	Cause	Retained
Guysborough	December 13, 1870	John Joseph Marshall	Anti-Confederate	William Henry Wylde	Anti-Confederate	Death	Yes
Halifax	November 17, 1870	Jeremiah Northup	Anti-Confederate	Philip Carteret Hill	Confederation Party	Appointed to the Senate (Results voided March 20, 1871. No by-election held.)	No
Inverness	October 22, 1868	Hiram Blanchard	Confederation Party	Hugh McDonald	Anti-Confederate	Void Election	No
Digby	December 12, 1867	William Berrian Vail	Anti-Confederate	William Berrian Vail	Anti-Confederate	Sought re-election upon appointment as Provincial Secretary	Yes
Shelburne	December 5, 1867†	Robert Robertson	Anti-Confederate	Robert Robertson	Anti-Confederate	Sought re-election upon appointment as Commissioner of Public Works and Mines	Yes
Pictou	December 5, 1867†	Martin Isaac Wilkins	Anti-Confederate	Martin Isaac Wilkins	Anti-Confederate	Sought re-election upon appointment as Attorney General	Yes

† Won by acclamation

== 23rd General Assembly of Nova Scotia 1863–1867 ==
By-election	Date	Incumbent	Party	Winner	Party	Cause	Retained
Yarmouth Township	January 16, 1866	George Stayley Brown	Liberal	William H. Townsend	Liberal	Resignation	Yes
Lunenburg	December 27, 1865	William Slocumb	Conservative	Abraham Hebb	Liberal	Death	No
Annapolis	January 12, 1865	James William Johnston	Conservative	William Hallett Ray	Liberal	Appointed Judge in Equity	No
Pictou East	December 12, 1864	James McDonald	Conservative	James McDonald	Conservative	Sought re-election upon appointment as Financial Secretary	Yes
Richmond	June 30, 1863	Isaac LeVesconte	Conservative	Isaac LeVesconte	Conservative	Sought re-election upon appointment as Financial Secretary	Yes
Cumberland	June 30, 1863	Charles Tupper	Conservative	Charles Tupper	Conservative	Sought re-election upon appointment as Provincial Secretary	Yes
Antigonish	June 30, 1863	William Alexander Henry	Conservative	William Alexander Henry	Conservative	Sought re-election upon appointment as Solicitor General	Yes
Annapolis	June 30, 1863	James William Johnston	Conservative	James William Johnston	Conservative	Sought re-election upon appointment as Premier and Attorney General	Yes

== 22nd General Assembly of Nova Scotia 1859–1863 ==
By-election	Date	Incumbent	Party	Winner	Party	Cause	Retained
Kings South	June 4, 1861	William Bennett Webster	Liberal	Daniel Charles Moore	Conservative	Death	No
Victoria	May 8, 1861	Charles James Campbell	Conservative	William Gammell	Liberal	By-election results voided	No
Cumberland	December 31, 1860	William Young	Liberal	Robert Donkin	Conservative	Appointed Chief Justice of Nova Scotia	No
Victoria	December 1860	Hugh Munro	Liberal	Charles James Campbell	Conservative	Appointed Chairman of the Board of Works	No
Hants South	March 9, 1860	Joseph Howe	Liberal	Joseph Howe	Liberal	Sought re-election upon appointment as Provincial Secretary	Yes
Halifax East	March 9, 1860	William Annand	Liberal	William Annand	Liberal	Sought re-election upon appointment as Financial Secretary	Yes
Colchester South	March 8, 1860	Adams George Archibald	Liberal	Adams George Archibald	Liberal	Sought re-election upon appointment as Attorney General	Yes

== 20th General Assembly of Nova Scotia 1855–1859 ==
By-election	Date	Incumbent	Party	Winner	Party	Cause	Retained
Hants County	July 29, 1858	Ichabod Dimock	Liberal	Bennett Smith	Conservative	Death	No
Colchester County	May 11, 1858	Gloud Wilson McLelan	Liberal	Archibald McLelan	Liberal	Death	Yes
Annapolis Township	February 4, 1858	Alfred Whitman	Conservative	Moses Shaw	Conservative	Appointed to the Legislative Council	Yes
Granville Township	January 26, 1858	Stephen S. Thorne	Conservative	Timothy Dwight Ruggles	Conservative	Appointed Chairman of the Board of Works	Yes
Guysborough County	March 30, 1857	John Joseph Marshall	Conservative	John Joseph Marshall	Conservative	Sought re-election upon appointment as Financial Secretary	Yes
Cumberland County	March 28, 1857	Charles Tupper	Conservative	Charles Tupper	Conservative	Sought re-election upon appointment as Provincial Secretary	Yes
Annapolis County	March 28, 1857	James William Johnston	Conservative	James William Johnston	Conservative	Sought re-election upon appointment as Premier and Attorney General	Yes
Pictou Township	March 26, 1857	Martin Isaac Wilkins	Conservative	Martin Isaac Wilkins	Conservative	Sought re-election upon appointment as Solicitor General	Yes
Windsor Township	September 9, 1856	Lewis Morris Wilkins	Liberal	Joseph Howe	Liberal	Appointed a judge	Yes
Sydney County	September 9, 1856	William Alexander Henry	Liberal	William Alexander Henry	Liberal	Sought re-election upon appointment as Provincial Secretary	Yes
Colchester County	September 9, 1856	Adams George Archibald	Liberal	Adams George Archibald	Liberal	Sought re-election upon appointment as Solicitor General	Yes
Cape Breton County	July 19, 1856	James McLeod	Liberal	Thomas Caldwell	Liberal	Death	Yes
Cornwallis Township	March 12, 1856	Samuel Chipman	Liberal	Samuel Chipman	Liberal	Sought re-election upon appointment as Financial Secretary	Yes

== 19th General Assembly of Nova Scotia 1851–1855 ==
By-election	Date	Incumbent	Party	Winner	Party	Cause	Retained
Windsor Township	May 16, 1854	Lewis Morris Wilkins	Conservative	Lewis Morris Wilkins	Liberal	Sought re-election upon appointment as Provincial Secretary	No
Sydney County	May 16, 1854	William Alexander Henry	Liberal	William Alexander Henry	Liberal	Sought re-election upon appointment as Solicitor General	Yes
Richmond County	May 16, 1854	James Boyle Uniacke	Liberal	Thomas Horace Fuller	Liberal	Appointed Commissioner of Crown Lands	Yes
Inverness County	May 9, 1854	William Young	Liberal	William Young	Liberal	Sought re-election upon appointment as Premier and Attorney General	Yes
Kings County	November 10, 1853	John C. Hall	Conservative	Mayhew Beckwith	Conservative	Death	Yes
Windsor Township	September 11, 1852	James D. Fraser	Conservative	Lewis Morris Wilkins	Conservative	Death	Yes
Cumberland County	March 22, 1852	Joseph Howe	Liberal	Joseph Howe	Liberal	Void Election	Yes
Cumberland County	March 22, 1852	Stephen Fulton	Liberal	Stephen Fulton	Liberal	Void Election	Yes

== 18th General Assembly of Nova Scotia 1847–1851 ==
By-election	Date	Incumbent	Party	Winner	Party	Cause	Retained
Colchester County	February 1851	Samuel Creelman	Liberal	Samuel Creelman	Liberal	Sought re-election upon appointment as Financial Secretary	Yes
Yarmouth County	February 1850	Herbert Huntington	Liberal	Herbert Huntington	Liberal	Sought re-election upon appointment as Financial Secretary	Yes
Guysborough County	December 1848	William Frederick DesBarres	Liberal	John Joseph Marshall	Conservative	Appointed a judge	No
Sydney Township	May 1848	Edmund Murray Dodd	Conservative	James McKeagney	Liberal	Appointed a judge	No
Cape Breton County	April 5, 1848	James Boyle Uniacke	Liberal	William Henry Munro	Liberal	Vacated seat upon appointment as Premier and Attorney General	Yes
Guysborough County	March 8, 1848	William Frederick DesBarres	Liberal	William Frederick DesBarres	Liberal	Sought re-election upon appointment as Solicitor General	Yes
Halifax Township	March 4, 1848	James McNab	Liberal	James Boyle Uniacke	Liberal	Appointed to the Legislative Council	Yes
Halifax County	March 4, 1848	Joseph Howe	Liberal	Joseph Howe	Liberal	Sought re-election upon appointment as Provincial Secretary	Yes

== 17th General Assembly of Nova Scotia 1843–1847 ==
By-election	Date	Incumbent	Party	Winner	Party	Cause	Retained
Richmond County	December 21, 1846	James Turnbull	Liberal	Arthur Brymer	Liberal	Death	Yes
Queens County	December 16, 1845	Samuel Prescott Fairbanks	Conservative	John Campbell	Conservative	Appointed Provincial Treasurer	Yes
Pictou Township	April 28, 1845	George Smith	Liberal	Henry Blackadar	Liberal	Void Election (Previous by-election opened March 17 and was suspended on March 20 and a new writ was issued)	Yes
Sydney Township	December 21, 1844	Edmund Murray Dodd	Conservative	Edmund Murray Dodd	Conservative	Sought re-election upon appointment as Solicitor General	Yes
Horton Township	March 21, 1844	Perez Benjamin	Liberal	Perez Benjamin	Liberal	Void Election	Yes

== 16th General Assembly of Nova Scotia 1840–1843 ==
By-election	Date	Incumbent	Party	Winner	Party	Cause	Retained
Halifax Township	December 13, 1841	Thomas Forrester	Liberal	William Machin Stairs	Liberal	Death	Yes
Windsor Township	December 1, 1841	Henry Goudge	Liberal	Henry Palmer	Liberal	Death	Yes
Richmond County	July 9, 1841	James Charles McKeagney	Liberal	William C. Delaney	Liberal	Void Election	Yes
Colchester County	June 3, 1841	Samuel George William Archibald	Liberal	Thomas Dickson	Liberal	Appointed Master of the Rolls and judge of the Vice-Admiralty Court	Yes
Cape Breton County	June 1841	James Boyle Uniacke	Liberal	James Boyle Uniacke	Liberal	Sought re-election upon appointment as Solicitor General	Yes

== 15th General Assembly of Nova Scotia 1836–1840 ==
By-election	Date	Incumbent	Party	Winner	Party	Cause	Retained
Lunenburg County	March 8, 1838	William Rudolf	Liberal	John Creighton	Conservative	Appointed to the Legislative Council	No
Pictou County	February 21, 1838	George Smith	Liberal	Thomas Dickson	Conservative	Appointed to the Legislative Council	No
Windsor Township	February 15, 1838	Lewis Morris Wilkins	Conservative	Richard McHeffy	Liberal	Appointed to the Legislative Council	No
Sydney County	November 17, 1837	John Young	Liberal	Richard J. Forrestall	Liberal	Death	Yes
Queens County	October 24, 1837	Joseph Freeman	Liberal	Zenas Waterman	Liberal	Death	Yes

== 14th General Assembly of Nova Scotia 1830–1836 ==
By-election	Date	Incumbent	Winner	Cause
Onslow Township	December 21, 1835	Robert Dickson	John Crowe	Death
Halifax Township	December 16, 1835	Charles Rufus Fairbanks	Hugh Bell	Appointed Master of the Rolls
Yarmouth Township	December 10, 1835	Samuel Sheldon Poole	Reuben Clements	Death
Hants County	June 2, 1834	William Blowers Bliss	William O'Brien	Appointed a judge
Windsor Township	February 26, 1833	David Dill	Joseph Dill	Void Election (David Dill lost at Sea)
Windsor Township	February 26, 1833	Joseph Dill	Lewis Morris Wilkins	By-election results reversed April 3, 1833
Shelburne County	November 26, 1832	John Forman	Abraham Lent	Death
Sydney Township	November 17, 1832	N/A	Edmund Murray Dodd	New Seat created
Cape Breton County	November 12, 1832	N/A	William Young	Cape Breton County given a third seat
Cape Breton County	November 12, 1832	William Young	Richard Smith	By-election results reversed April 10, 1833
Arichat Township	November 1832	N/A	Laurence O'Connor Doyle	New Seat created
Granville Township	November 16, 1831	Timothy Ruggles	James Delap	Death
Cape Breton County	1831	James Boyle Uniacke	James Boyle Uniacke	Void Election

== 13th General Assembly of Nova Scotia 1826–1830 ==
By-election	Date	Incumbent	Winner	Cause
Annapolis County	December 7, 1829	Thomas Chandler Haliburton	John Johnston	Appointed a judge
Shelburne Township	June 1, 1829	John Alexander Barry	John Alexander Barry	Expulsion. Declared in contempt of parliament and placed into custody for refusing to apologize for publishing a letter adjudged to be libelous
Shelburne County	January 7, 1829	James Budd Moody	John Forman	Death
Kings County	February 12, 1828	John Starr	William Allen Chipman	Death
Hants County	February 1827	John MacKay	Richard Smith	Death

== 12th General Assembly of Nova Scotia 1820–1826 ==
By-election	Date	Incumbent	Winner	Cause
Falmouth Township	January 26, 1826	William Mayhew Young	William Shey	Death
Sydney County	May 3, 1825	John Young	John Young	Previous by-election declared void
Halifax County	February 28, 1825	Simon Bradstreet Robie	Lawrence Hartshorne, Jr.	Appointed to the Nova Scotia Council
Shelburne Township	August 26, 1824	Jared Ingersol Chipman	Thomas Caldwell	Appointed a judge
Sydney County	July 18, 1824	John George Marshall	John Young	Appointed a judge
Annapolis County	July 14, 1824	Thomas Ritchie	Abraham Gesner	Appointed a judge
Hants County	July 2, 1824	William Hersey Otis Haliburton	Benjamin DeWolf	Appointed a judge
Halifax Township	September 8, 1823	George Grassie	Charles Rufus Fairbanks	Death
Cumberland County	February 5, 1821	George Oxley	Robert Blair	Death
Horton Township	January 2, 1821	Jonathan Crane	Sherman Denison	Death

== 11th General Assembly of Nova Scotia 1818–1820 ==
By-election	Date	Incumbent	Winner	Cause
Halifax County	November 23, 1819	Edward Mortimer	George Smith	Death
Digby Township	May 12, 1819	William Henry Roach	William Henry Roach	Void Election

== 10th General Assembly of Nova Scotia 1811–1818 ==
By-election	Date	Incumbent	Winner	Cause
Annapolis County	June 4, 1817	Peleg Wiswall	Cereno Upham Jones	Appointed a judge
Lunenburg County	June 2, 1817	Lewis Morris Wilkins	Edward James	Appointed a judge
Sydney County	May 20, 1814	Samuel Hood George	John Cunningham	Death
Yarmouth Township	September 3, 1813	Samuel Marshall	Samuel Sheldon Poole	Death
Queens County	August 25, 1813	George Collins	John Barss	Death
Sydney County	August 13, 1812	James Ballaine	Samuel Hood George	Death

== 9th General Assembly of Nova Scotia 1806–1811 ==
By-election	Date	Incumbent	Winner	Cause
Lunenburg Township	March 30, 1810	John Bolman	John Creighton, Jr.	Unseated for lack of attendance
Falmouth Township	May 31, 1809	Jeremiah Northup	William Henry Shey	Death
Annapolis Township	1808	Thomas Walker	William Robertson	Void Election
Annapolis County	May 11, 1808	Henry Rutherford	Phineas Lovett, Jr.	Death
Sydney County	May 9, 1808	William Allen Chipman	John Cunningham	Previous by-election voided
Sydney County	1807	Edward Irish	William Allen Chipman	Death

== 8th General Assembly of Nova Scotia 1799–1806 ==
By-election	Date	Incumbent	Winner	Cause
Shelburne County	1805	James Cox	Jacob Van Buskirk	Death
Yarmouth Township	1804	Nathan Utley	Samuel Sheldon Poole	Death
Halifax County	1803	Michael Wallace	William Lyon	Appointed to the Council
Halifax Township	1801	Andrew Belcher	John George Pyke	Appointed to the Council
Amherst Township	1801	Thomas Lusby	Thomas Law Dickson	Death
Queens County	March 24, 1801	James Taylor	Snow Parker	Death
Halifax County	May 22, 1800	William Cottnam Tonge	Michael Wallace	Void Election
Halifax Township	April 9, 1800	John George Pyke	Andrew Belcher	Void Election

== 7th General Assembly of Nova Scotia 1793–1799 ==
By-election	Date	Incumbent	Winner	Cause
Shelburne County	1798	James Humphreys	George Gracie	Unseated for lack of attendance, had returned to Philadelphia
Queens County	1798	Benajah Collins	Richard John Uniacke	Resignation upon emigrating to Danvers, Massachusetts
Halifax County	June 15, 1798	Jonathan Sterns	James Stewart	Death
Onslow Township	1797	Charles Dickson	Daniel Eaton	Death
Halifax County	February 13, 1797	James Michael Freke Bulkeley	Charles Morris	Death

== 6th General Assembly of Nova Scotia 1785–1793 ==
By-election	Date	Incumbent	Winner	Cause
Hants County	1792	Winckworth Tonge	George Henry Monk	Death
Newport Township	1791	John Day, Jr.	William Cottnam Tonge	Resignation upon appointment as Sheriff of Hants County
Londonderry Township	1789	James Smith	Robert McElhinney	Unseated for being a public defaulter
Barrington Township	1789	Joseph Aplin	Gideon White	Emigrated from the province
Annapolis Township	1789	Stephen De Lancey	James De Lancey	Appointed to office in the Bahamas.
Halifax County	February 22, 1788	Sampson Salter Blowers	Charles Morris (1759–1831)	Appointed to the Council
Liverpool Township	June 15, 1787	George William Sherlock	George William Sherlock	Previous by-election declared void
Liverpool Township	March 14, 1787	Ephraim Dean	George William Sherlock	Death
Cumberland County	1786	Christopher Harper	Philip Marchington	Election voided due to Harper not being a resident (Thomas Watson was also elected due to an error in the by-election writ calling for the election of two members instead of one and only Marchington was seated.)
Annapolis County	1786	David Seabury	David Seabury	Void Election
Annapolis County	1786	David Seabury	Alexander Howe	By-election results reversed June 15, 1786
Amherst Township	1786	William Freeman	Charles Hill	Election voided due to Freeman not being a resident

== 5th General Assembly of Nova Scotia 1770–1785 ==
By-election	Date	Incumbent	Winner	Cause
Queens County	1784	Nathaniel Freeman	Benajah Collins	Non-attendance
Newport Township	1784	Isaac Deschamps	Joshua Sanford	Appointed to the Council
Kings County	1784	Winckworth Tonge	Jonathan Crane	Non-attendance
Halifax County	1784	William Nesbitt	William Abbott	Resigned and was granted a pension
Annapolis Township	1784	Phineas Lovett, Jr.	Stephen De Lancey	Non-attendance
Sunbury County	1783	James Simonds	William Davidson	Non-attendance
Sackville Township	1783	Robert Foster	Richard John Uniacke	Absconded from province
Onslow Township	1783	Charles Dickson	Charles Dickson	Refused to take the Oath of Allegiance
Hants County	1783	New Seat	George Brightman	Hants County created
Hants County	1783	New Seat	Benjamin DeWolf	Hants County created
Lunenburg Township	1783	Philip Augustus Knaut	Casper Wollenhaupt	Death
Cumberland Township	1783	Hezekiah King	Martin Gay	Non-attendance
Annapolis County	1783	Henry Evans	John Ritchie	Non-attendance (Died the same year)
Amherst Township	1783	New Seat	William Freeman	Amherst Township enfranchised
Windsor Township	1782	New Seat	George Deschamps	Windsor Township enfranchised
Halifax Township	February 28, 1782	Thomas Bridge	Benjamin Green, Jr.	Emigrated
Truro Township	1781	Samuel Archibald	John Harris	Refused to take Oath of Allegiance
Kings County	1780	Henry Denny Denson	John Whidden	Death
Queens County	April 20, 1780	William Smith	Nathaniel Freeman	Death
Londonderry Township	1779	John Morrison	John Cunningham	Absconded and left the province
Halifax County	1779	James Browne	John George Pyke	Emigrated
Yarmouth Township	April 12, 1779	James Monk	Richard Cunningham	Non-attendance, left for Quebec
Horton Township	January 28, 1779	Joseph Pierce	Thomas Caldwell	Resignation due to age and infirmities
Halifax County	1778	William Howard South	James Browne	Death
Sackville Township	August 22, 1776	Samuel Rogers	Robert Foster	Non-attendance
Cumberland Township	August 21, 1776	John Allan	Hezekiah King	Non-attendance
Cumberland County	August 20, 1776	William Scurr	Thomas Dixson	Non-attendance
Annapolis County	August 20, 1776	John Hall	Henry Evans	Non-attendance
Horton Township	August 19, 1776	Charles Dickson	Joseph Pierce	Non-attendance due to illness
Cornwallis Township	August 14, 1776	Samuel Willoughby	John Chipman	Non-attendance
Onslow Township	August 6, 1776	Joshua Lamb	Charles Dickson	Non-attendance
Halifax County	1776	Robert Campbell	James Brenton	Death
Halifax Township	April 20, 1776	John Day	Joseph Fairbanks	Death (Lost at sea)
Onslow Township	February 17, 1776	Richard Upham	Joshua Lamb	Death
Yarmouth Township	1775	John Crawley	James Monk	Non-attendance
Truro Township	1775	William Fisher	Samuel Archibald	Non-attendance
Onslow Township	1775	Joshua Lamb	Richard Upham	Non-attendance
Falmouth Township	1775	Edward York	Jeremiah Northup	Non-attendance
Cumberland Township	1775	Jonathan Eddy	John Allan	Non-attendance, joined the American Revolutionaries
Cumberland County	1775	Jotham Gay	Jotham Gay	Non-attendance
Cumberland County	1775	John Huston	William Scurr	Non-attendance
Annapolis Township	1775	Obadiah Wheelock	Phineas Lovett, Jr.	Non-attendance
Annapolis County	1775	Phineas Lovett, Sr.	John Hall	Non-attendance
Annapolis County	1775	Joseph Patten	William Shaw	Non-attendance
Liverpool Township	July 3, 1775	Seth Harding	Thomas Cochran	Non-attendance
Lunenburg County	1775	John Creighton	John Newton	Appointed to the Council
Halifax Township	August 25, 1774	Charles Procter	John Day	Death
Sackville Township	November 6, 1773	Robert Foster	Samuel Rogers	Non-attendance
Lunenburg County	November 5, 1773	Archibald Hinshelwood	Otto William Schwartz	Death
Halifax County	1773	John Butler	John Philipps	Appointed to the Council
Liverpool Township	July 2, 1773	Samuel Doggett	Seth Harding	Non-attendance, Went to the West Indies
Sunbury County	June 28, 1773	Israel Perley	James Simonds	Non-attendance
Londonderry Township	February 20, 1773	John Morrison	John Morrison	Non-attendance
Truro Township	February 4, 1773	William Fisher	William Fisher	Non-attendance
Yarmouth Township	December 3, 1772	Malachy Salter	John Crawley	Void Election
Halifax County	1772	John Newton	William Howard South	Non-attendance
Granville Township	1772	John Harris	Christopher Prince	Death
Barrington Township	1772	Richard Gibbons	John Fillis	Void Election
Cumberland County	September 23, 1772	Joshua Winslow	Jotham Gay	Non-attendance
Liverpool Township	May 26, 1772	John Doggett	Samuel Doggett	Death
Falmouth Township	1771	Isaac Deschamps	Edward York	Double election, chose to sit for Newport Township

== 4th General Assembly of Nova Scotia 1765–1770 ==
By-election	Date	Incumbent	Winner	Cause
Newport Township	October 7, 1769	John Day	Henry Denny Denson	Apparently left for Philadelphia.
Halifax County	1768	Benjamin Gerrish	John Fillis	Appointed to the Council
Granville Township	1768	Henry Munroe	John Hicks	Resignation
Sunbury County	September 20, 1768	Beamsley Perkins Glasier	Richard Shore	Did not take their seats
Sunbury County	September 20, 1768	Thomas Falconer	Phineas Nevers	Did not take their seats
Liverpool Township	August 17, 1768	Elisha Freeman	Ephraim Dean	Resignation due to old age
Queens County	August 17, 1768	Simeon Perkins	John Doggett	Apparently unseated for lack of attendance
Horton Township	1767	William Welch	Charles Dickson	Seat Vacated
Londonderry Township	October 26, 1767	New Seat	Alexander McNutt	Londonderry Township enfranchised
Yarmouth Township	1766	New Seat	Malachy Salter	Yarmouth Township enfranchised
Sackville Township	1766	New Seat	Benjamin Mason	Sackville Township enfranchised
Truro Township	May 24, 1766	Charles Morris (1731–1802)	David Archibald	Chose to sit for Kings County
Barrington Township	March 24, 1766	New Seat	Francis White	Barrington Township enfranchised
Breton County	March 21, 1766	New Seat	Gregory Townshend	Breton County created. Results voided due to insufficient freeholders June 14, 1766
Breton County	March 21, 1766	New Seat	John Grant	Breton County created. Results voided due to insufficient freeholders June 14, 1766
Sunbury County	August 1, 1765	New Seat	Beamsley Perkins Glasier	Sunbury County created.
Sunbury County	August 1, 1765	New Seat	Thomas Falconer	Sunbury County created.

== 3rd General Assembly of Nova Scotia 1761–1765 ==
By-election	Date	Incumbent	Winner	Cause
Halifax County	May 6, 1762	Michael Francklin	John Butler	Appointed to the Council
Annapolis County	May 6, 1762	John Steele	John Harris	Death
Onslow Township	September 7, 1761	New Seat	William Nevil Wolseley	Onslow Township enfranchised
Onslow Township	September 7, 1761	New Seat	David Cutten	Onslow Township enfranchised

== 2nd General Assembly of Nova Scotia 1759–1760 ==
no by-elections

== 1st General Assembly of Nova Scotia 1758–1759 ==
By-election	Date	Incumbent	Winner	Cause
Nova Scotia at-Large	Jan. 10, 1759	Benjamin Gerrish	Archibald Hinshelwood	Left the Province. Richard Bowers contested the result and Hinshelwood quit his seat on April 9, 1759.
Nova Scotia at-Large	Jan. 10, 1759	John Anderson	Unknown	Left the Province. No record of this by-election.

== See also ==
- List of federal by-elections in Canada
