= 4th General Assembly of Nova Scotia =

A series of writs for the election of the 4th General Assembly of Nova Scotia were issued February 2–19, 1765, returnable by March 13, 1765. The assembly convened on May 28, 1765, held eight sessions, and was dissolved on April 2, 1770.

== Sessions ==
Dates of specific sessions are under research.

== Governor and Council ==
- Governor: Montague Wilmot -died May 23, 1766
  - Lieutenant Governor: vacant
- Administrator: Benjamin Green served as acting governor after Wilmot's death
- Lieutenant Governor: Michael Francklin -named August 23, 1766, served as acting governor until Campbell arrived
- Governor: Lord William Campbell -named November 27, 1766
  - Lieutenant Governor: Michael Francklin

The members of the Council are currently under research.

== House of Assembly ==
=== Officers ===
- Speaker of the House: William Nesbitt of Halifax County
- Clerk of the House: Isaac Deschamps of Falmouth Township

=== Division of seats ===
An order in Council on January 30, 1765 allocated seats as follows:

- 4 seats: Halifax County
- 2 seats each: Annapolis, Lunenburg, Kings, Cumberland, and Queens Counties, and Halifax Township
- 1 seat each: Horton, Cornwallis, Falmouth, Cumberland, Granville, Annapolis, Lunenburg, Liverpool, Onslow, Truro, and Newport Townships

making a total of 27 seats.

During the assembly, Sunbury County was created with 2 seats and Londonderry, Sackville, Yarmouth, and Barrington Townships were created with 1 seat each, for a total of 33 seats.

(Cape) Breton County was also created, and 2 members were elected, but the seats were held not to exist due to insufficient freeholders.

=== Members ===
Electoral District	Name	First elected / previously elected	Notes
Annapolis County	Joseph Winniett	1765	
Annapolis County	John Harris	1762	
Annapolis Township	Jonathan Hoar	1765	
Barrington Township	Francis White	1766	initial by-election March 24, 1766, took seat July 1, 1767, seat declared vacant November 8, 1769.
(Cape) Breton County (Note: initial by-election, writ issued December 16, 1765, returned March 21, 1766. Election declared invalid June 14, 1766 due to insufficient freeholders, and these two members were never seated.)	Gregory Townshend	1766	
(Cape) Breton County	John Grant	1766	
Cornwallis Township	John Burbidge	1758	
Cumberland County	Benoni Danks	1765	took seat June 21, 1766
Cumberland County	Gamaliel Smethurst	1765	
Cumberland Township	Josia Troop	1765	attended, seat declared vacant November 8, 1769
Falmouth Township	Isaac Deschamps	1761	
Granville Township	Henry Munroe	1765	resigned June 21, 1768.
Granville Township	John Hicks (1768)	1768	by-election, took seat October 31, 1768.
Halifax County	William Nesbitt	1758	
Halifax County	Benjamin Gerrish	1758	resigned June 27, 1768 after being appointed to the Council.
Halifax County	John Fillis (1768)	1768	by-election, took seat October 22, 1768.
Halifax County	John Butler	1762	
Halifax County	William Best	1758, 1761	
Halifax Township	Charles Procter	1765	
Halifax Township	Richard Wenman	1765	
Horton Township	William Welch	1761	attended, seat declared vacant August 1, 1767.
Horton Township	Charles Dickson (1768)	1768	by-election, writ issued September 28, 1767, took seat June 18, 1768.
Kings County	Winckworth Tonge	1765	
Kings County	Charles Morris	1761	
Liverpool Township	Elisha Freeman	1765	attended, resigned due to age October 19, 1767.
Liverpool Township	Ephraim Dean (1768)	1768	by-election, August 17, 1768, but election disputed October 28, 1768. Apparently did not serve.
Londonderry Township	Alexander McNutt	1767	initial by-election, October 26, 1767, seat declared vacant November 8, 1769.
Lunenburg County	Joseph Pernette	1761	
Lunenburg County	Philip Augustus Knaut	1758	
Lunenburg Township	Archibald Hinshelwood	1759	
Newport Township	John Day	1765	attended, seat vacated in 1769, but no record in the journal why. Other sources indicate he left for Philadelphia.
Newport Township	Henry Denny Denson	1769	by-election October 7, 1769, took seat October 16, 1769.
Onslow Township	James Brenton	1765	
Queens County	William Smith	1765	
Queens County	Simeon Perkins	1765	seat apparently declared vacant July 1766, but not directly noted in the journal.
Queens County	John Doggett (1768)	1768	by-election, August 17, 1768, but its not clear if he ever took the seat.
Sackville Township	Benjamin Mason	1766	initial by-election 1766, took seat October 27, 1766; seat declared vacant November 8, 1769
Sunbury County	Beamsley Perkins Glasier	1765	initial by-election, writ issued May 30, 1765, returned Aug. 1, 1765 but never took seat.
Sunbury County	Thomas Falconer	1765	initial by-election, writ issued May 30, 1765, returned August 1, 1765 but never took seat.
Sunbury County	Richard Shorne (1768)	1768	by-election, September 20, 1768
Sunbury County	Phineas Nevers (1768)	1768	by-election, September 20, 1768
Truro Township	Charles Morris	1761	elected for both Kings County and Truro Township, gave up this seat.
Truro Township	David Archibald	1766	by-election, writ issued February 19, 1766, returned May 24, 1766, took seat June 5, 1766.
Yarmouth Township	Malachy Salter	1766	initial by-election, took seat October 24, 1766; did not attend after 1768.

Note: Unless otherwise noted, members were elected at the general election, and took their seats at the convening of the assembly. By-elections are special elections held to fill specific vacancies. When a member is noted as having taking their seat on a certain date, but a by-election isn't noted, the member was elected at the general election but arrived late.

== Notes ==
Preceded by 3rd General Assembly of Nova Scotia	General Assemblies of Nova Scotia; 1765–1770	Succeeded by 5th General Assembly of Nova Scotia
