= 2nd General Assembly of Nova Scotia =

A writ for the election of the 2nd General Assembly of Nova Scotia was issued on August 23, 1759. The assembly convened on December 4, 1759, held two sessions, and was dissolved by the death of King George II on October 25, 1760.

== Sessions ==
Dates of specific sessions are under research.

== Governor and Council ==
- Governor: Charles Lawrence -died in office 19 October 1760.
- Lieutenant Governor: vacant
- Administrator: Jonathan Belcher served as acting governor after Lawrence's death

The members of the Council are currently under research.

== House of Assembly ==
=== Officers ===
- Speaker of the House: William Nesbitt of Halifax County
- Clerk of the House: Archibald Hinshelwood of Lunenburg County

=== Division of seats ===
Five counties were created after the 1st assembly was dissolved, and were granted two seats each. In addition, Halifax and Lunenburg Townships retained their 4 and 2 seats, respectively. The Townships of Annapolis, Horton, and Cumberland were also granted 2 seats each, for a total of 22 seats. Horton failed to elect its members.

=== Members ===
Electoral District	Name	First elected	Notes
Annapolis County	Jared C. Troop	1759	
Annapolis County	Jonathan Hoar	1759	
Annapolis County	Isaac Deschamps	1759	
Annapolis Township	Erasmus James Philipps	1759	died Sept. 26, 1760.
Annapolis Township	John Newton	1759	
Cumberland County	Winckworth Tonge	1759	
Cumberland County	Simon Slocomb	1759	
Cumberland Township	Joseph Frye	1759	
Cumberland Township	John Huston	1759	
Halifax County	William Nesbitt	1758	
Halifax County	Henry Newton	1758	
Halifax Township	Malachy Salter	1758	
Halifax Township	Jonathan Binney	1758	
Halifax Township	John Burbidge	1758	
Halifax Township	Benjamin Gerrish	1758	
Horton Township	did not elect its two members		
Kings County	Joseph Scott	1759	
Kings County	Charles Procter	1759	
Lunenburg County	Michael Francklin	1759	
Lunenburg County	Archibald Hinshelwood	1759	
Lunenburg Township	Sebastian Zouberbuhler	1759	
Lunenburg Township	Philip Knaut	1758	

Note: Unless otherwise noted, members were elected at the general election, and took their seats at the convening of the assembly. By-elections are special elections held to fill specific vacancies. When a member is noted as having taking their seat on a certain date, but a by-election isn't noted, the member was elected at the general election but arrived late.

Preceded by 1st General Assembly of Nova Scotia	General Assemblies of Nova Scotia; 1759–1760	Succeeded by 3rd General Assembly of Nova Scotia
