= Benjamin DeWolf (politician) =

Canadian politician

Benjamin DeWolf JP

Member of the Nova Scotia House of Assembly for Hants County
- In office 1783–1798

Personal details
- Born: 14 October 1744 Lyme, Connecticut, British America
- Died: 1 September 1819 (aged 74) Windsor, Nova Scotia
- Spouse: Rachel Otis (after 1769)
- Children: 8
- Parent(s): Simeon DeWolf; Parnell Kirtland DeWolf

Benjamin DeWolf JP (October 14, 1744 – September 1/2, 1819) was a businessman and political figure in Nova Scotia. He represented Hants County in the Nova Scotia House of Assembly from 1783 to 1798.

== Early life ==
DeWolf was born in Lyme, Connecticut on October 17, 1744 in the prominent DeWolf family. He was a son of Simeon DeWolf (1719–1780) and Parnell (née Kirtland) DeWolf (1724–1827), who emigrated to Nova Scotia.

His paternal grandparents were Benjamin DeWolf and Susannah (née Douglas) DeWolf of Lyme and his maternal grandparents were John Kirtland and Lydia (née Belden) Kirtland of Saybrook, Connecticut.

== Career ==
DeWolf had received a number of large land grants near Windsor. He represented Hants County in the Nova Scotia House of Assembly from 1783 to 1798. In 1788, he was named a justice of the peace. DeWolf served as High Sheriff for Hants County.

In the autumn of 1780, DeWolf offered a "handsome reward" to anyone "securing a Negro boy named 'Mungo', 'about fourteen years old and well built'." His account books showed the sales in the West Indies of slaves from Hants County. DeWolf was also said to have given his slaves their freedom, but they chose to remain in his employ.

== Personal life ==
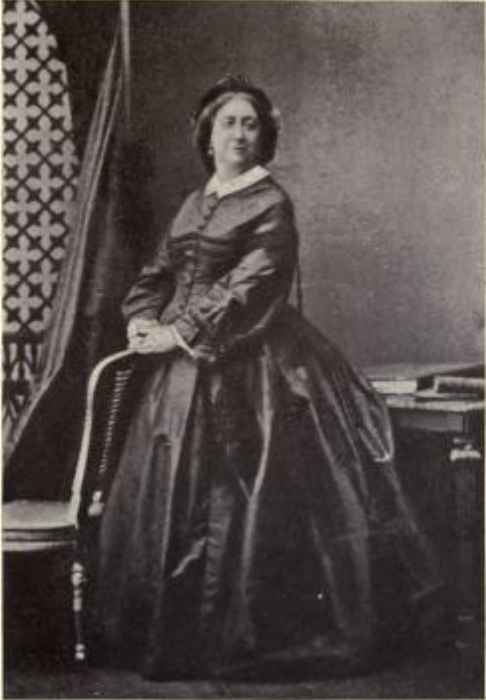
His granddaughter, Lady Gore

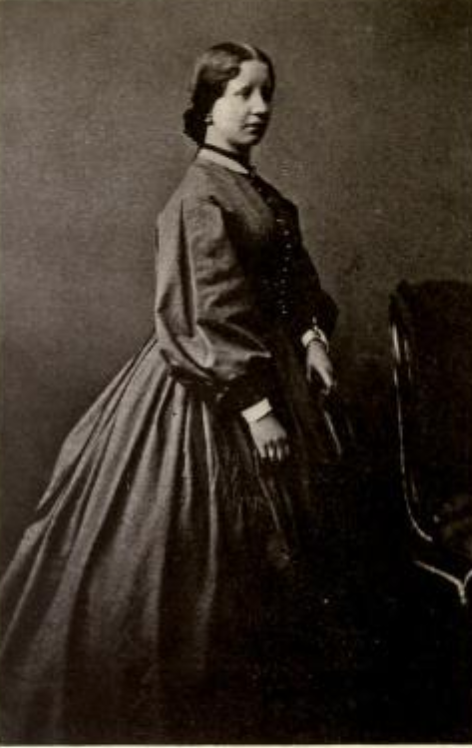
His granddaughter, Catharine Suther.

On 16 March 1769, he married Rachel Otis (1741–1807), a daughter of Dr. Ephraim Otis of Scituate, Massachusetts, and sister of Susannah (née Otis) Haliburton (mother of William Hersey Otis Haliburton). Together, they were the parents of:

- Sarah Hersey Otis DeWolf (b. 1770), who married Maj. Nathaniel Ray Thomas Jr., the Collector of Customs at Windsor who was a son of prominent Loyalist Nathaniel Ray Thomas, and a first cousin of Lady Frances Wentworth (who was known for her affair with Price William Henry, later King William IV).
- Rachel Hersey DeWolf (1772–1772), who died in infancy.
- Rachel Otis DeWolf (1773–1815), who married James Fraser (c. 1760–1822) in 1802. Fraser, who was born in Inverness, Scotland, served in the New Brunswick assembly and the Nova Scotia Council.
- John DeWolf (1775–1775), who died in childbirth.
- Susanna Isabella DeWolf (1776–1777), who died young.
- Frances Mary DeWolf (1778–1791), who died young.
- Isabella Amelia DeWolf (b. 1779), who married Capt. John McKay of 27th Regiment in 1821.
- Harriet Sophia DeWolf (b. 1781), who married Rev. William Colsell King, Rector of Windsor, in 1799.

DeWolf died on 1 September 1819 in Windsor, one of the oldest magistrates in the Province and, by that point, an inhabitant of Windsor for upwards of fifty years.

=== Descendants ===
Through his eldest daughter Sarah, he was a grandfather of Sarah Rachel Thomas, who married Judge Lewis Morris Wilkins (a son of Lewis Morris Wilkins and grandson of Isaac Wilkins and Isabella (née Morris) Wilkins, sister of Lewis Morris).

Through his surviving daughter Rachel, he was a grandfather of Sarah Rachel Fraser (b. 1803), who married Hon. Charles Stephen Gore (third son of the Arthur Gore, 2nd Earl of Arran and was the mother of Eliza Amelia Gore (1829–1916), who married William Hay, 19th Earl of Erroll in 1848 and who served as Lady-in-waiting to Queen Victoria for twenty-eight years); James DeWolf Fraser (1805–1852), who married Catharine Prescott (daughter of Charles Ramage Prescott); Harriet Amelia Fraser (1806–1880), who married Col. Dixon in 1826; Amelia Isabella Fraser (1808–1837); Frances Mary Fraser (1809–1827); Dr. Benjamin DeWolf Fraser (1812–1888); Catharine Fraser (1813–1880), who married the Rev. Thomas G. Suther, Bishop of Aberdeen and Orkney; and Mary Hulbert Fraser (1813–1822).
