= William Best (Nova Scotia politician) =

Political figure (c.1707–1782)

William Best (c. 1707 – November 17, 1782) was a political figure in Nova Scotia. He was a member of the 1st General Assembly from 1758 to 1759, and the 3rd and 4th assemblies from 1761 to 1770.

He came to Halifax in 1749 and later settled at Cornwallis. In 1779, with John Burbidge, he helped establish an Anglican church there. In 1783, he was named a justice of the peace for King's County. Best died in Halifax at the age of 75.

One of his descendants, Charles Best, discovered insulin with Frederick Banting.
