= 2nd Nova Scotia general election =

The 2nd Nova Scotia general election may refer to:

- Nova Scotia general election, 1759, the 2nd general election to take place in the Colony of Nova Scotia, for the 2nd General Assembly of Nova Scotia
- 1871 Nova Scotia general election, the 24th overall general election for Nova Scotia, for the (due to a counting error in 1859) 25th Legislative Assembly of Nova Scotia, but considered the 2nd general election for the Canadian province of Nova Scotia
