= Nathaniel Freeman =

Nathaniel Freeman may refer to:

- Nathaniel Freeman (physician) (1741–1827), American physician and politician
- Nathaniel Freeman Jr. (1766–1800), American politician
- Nathaniel Freeman (Nova Scotia politician) (1740–1795), merchant and political figure in Nova Scotia

== See also ==
- Nat Friedman (born 1977), Nathaniel Friedman (pronounced Freedman), computer programmer
