= 4th Nova Scotia general election =

The 4th Nova Scotia general election may refer to:

- The Nova Scotia general election of 1765, the 4th general election to take place in the Colony of Nova Scotia, for the 4th General Assembly of Nova Scotia
- 1878 Nova Scotia general election, the 26th overall general election for Nova Scotia, for the (due to a counting error in 1859) 27th Legislative Assembly of Nova Scotia, but considered the 4th general election for the Canadian province of Nova Scotia
