= Thomas Law Dickson =

Nova Scotian politician

Thomas Law Dickson (ca 1769 – after 1810) was a farmer, judge and political figure in Nova Scotia. He represented Amherst Township in the Nova Scotia House of Assembly from 1802 to 1806. His surname also appears as Dixon.

He was the son of Thomas Dixson and Catherine Weatherhead (or Weathered). He was elected to the assembly in an 1802 by-election held following the death of Thomas Lusby. In 1810, he was named judge in the Inferior Court of Common Pleas. Dickson lived in Amherst. He married Sarah Pipes.
