= William Howard South =

Nova Scotian politician

William Howard South (died September 1777) was a political figure in Nova Scotia. He represented Halifax County in the Legislative Assembly of Nova Scotia from 1773 to 1777.

He was married twice: first to Lydia Franklyn in 1756 and then to Cicely Gafford In 1775. South was a major in the Halifax militia. He was elected to the assembly in a 1773 by-election held after John Newton's seat was declared vacant for non-attendance. South was named provost marshal for Nova Scotia in 1777 during the suspension of John Fenton. He died in office and was buried in Halifax.
