= John Cunningham (Nova Scotia judge) =

Nova Scotian politician

John Cunningham (before 1761 – after 1785) was an Irish-born office-holder and political figure in Nova Scotia. He represented Londonderry Township in the Legislative Assembly of Nova Scotia from 1779 to 1785.

He came to Halifax around 1761. In 1763, he married Elizabeth Rust. Cunningham served as commissioner of Indian Affairs from 1769 to 1774 and in 1783 became superintendent of Indian Affairs. He was named a magistrate in 1776 and a judge in the Inferior Court of Common Pleas in 1778. He was elected to the assembly in a 1779 by-election held after John Morrison left the province, and took his seat June 7, 1779. In 1783, he was named receiver-general of Quit Rents.

His brother Richard also served in the assembly.
