= Charles Gore (British Army officer) =

British Army general

General The Honourable Sir Charles Gore GCB KH
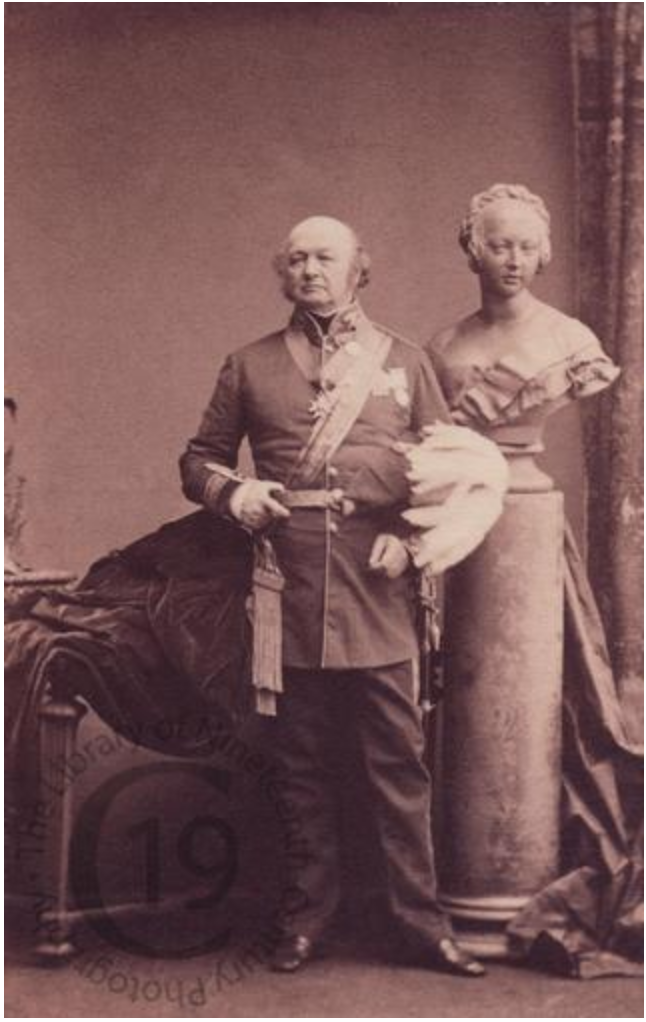

Personal details
- Born: 26 December 1793
- Died: 4 September 1869 (aged 75) Chelsea, London, England
- Spouse: Sarah Rachel Fraser (m. 1824)
- Children: 5
- Parent(s): Arthur Gore, 2nd Earl of Arran; Elizabeth Underwood
- Relatives: Cecilia Underwood, Duchess of Inverness (sister); Arthur Gore, 3rd Earl of Arran (half-brother)

Military service
- Years of service: 1808–1869
- Rank: General
- Unit: 91st Regiment of Foot; 6th Regiment of Foot
- Battles/wars: Peninsular War; Siege of Badajoz; Siege of Ciudad Rodrigo; Lower Canada Rebellion; Battle of Saint-Denis

General Sir Charles Stephen Gore GCB KH (26 December 1793 – 4 September 1869) was a British Army officer.

== Early life ==
Gore was a son of Arthur Gore, 2nd Earl of Arran and, his third wife, the former Elizabeth Underwood. Among his siblings were Lady Cecilia Underwood (the second wife of Prince Augustus Frederick, Duke of Sussex, the sixth son of King George III). From his father's first marriage to Catherine Annesley (the only daughter of the 1st Viscount Glerawly), his half-siblings included Arthur Gore, 3rd Earl of Arran, Lady Anne Jane Gore (the third wife of John Hamilton, 1st Marquess of Abercorn), and Lady Catherine Charlotte Gore (wife of John Evans-Freke, 6th Baron Carbery).

His paternal grandparents were Arthur Gore, 1st Earl of Arran (eldest son of Sir Arthur Gore, 2nd Baronet) and the former Jane Worth (widow of William Worth of Rathfarnham). His maternal grandparents were Richard Underwood, Esq. and the former Christiana Goold (a daughter of Caleb Goold of Dublin).

== Career ==
He entered the army in 1808. During the Peninsular War, he fought in the Siege of Badajoz and Siege of Ciudad Rodrigo, both in 1812. He served in Canada and fought in the Battle of Saint-Denis during the Lower Canada Rebellion.

He was Colonel of the 91st (Argyllshire) Regiment of Foot from 1855 to 1861, transferring in 1861 to the 6th (Royal 1st Warwickshire) Regiment of Foot, a position he held until his death in 1869.

Gore served under Lt. Gov. James Kempt while he was posted to Nova Scotia (1820–1828). He also served as Lieutenant Governor of Chelsea Hospital.

== Personal life ==
Gore was married to Sarah Rachel Fraser (1803–1880) of Halifax, Nova Scotia. She was the eldest daughter of James Fraser, a member of the Council of Nova Scotia, and Rachel Otis (née DeWolf) Fraser (a daughter of Benjamin DeWolf). Together, they were the parents of five children, including:

- Adelaide Rachel Gore (d. 1893), who married Lt.-Gen. George Whitworth Talbot Rich, son of Sir George Bostock Rich (son of Sir Charles Bostock Rich, 1st Bt), in 1864.
- Maj. James Arthur Charles Gore (1826–1901), who married Catherine Louise Bazalgette, daughter of Col. John Bazalgette, in 1854.
- Eliza Amelia Gore (1829–1916), who married William Hay, 19th Earl of Erroll, a grandson of King William IV through his mistress, the famous comic actress Dora Bland (who was known as "Mrs. Jordan").
- Lt.-Col. Charles Clitheroe Gore (1839–1926), who married Maria Harriet Elizabeth Cator, daughter of the Rev. Thomas Cator and Lady Louisa Lumley-Savile (daughter of John Lumley-Savile, 7th Earl of Scarbrough), in 1875. After her death, he married Lavinia FitzRoy, daughter of Francis Charles FitzRoy, in 1882.
- Lt.-Col. Frederick Augustus Gore (1844–1931), who married Alice Schenley, daughter of Edward Wyndham Harrington Schenley, in 1886.

Sir Charles died on 4 September 1869 in Chelsea, London. He is buried in Brompton Cemetery in London near the north end of the central colonnades. His widow died on 17 October 1880.

=== Legacy ===
The community of Gore, Nova Scotia is named after him when he served in Nova Scotia.

== Gallery ==
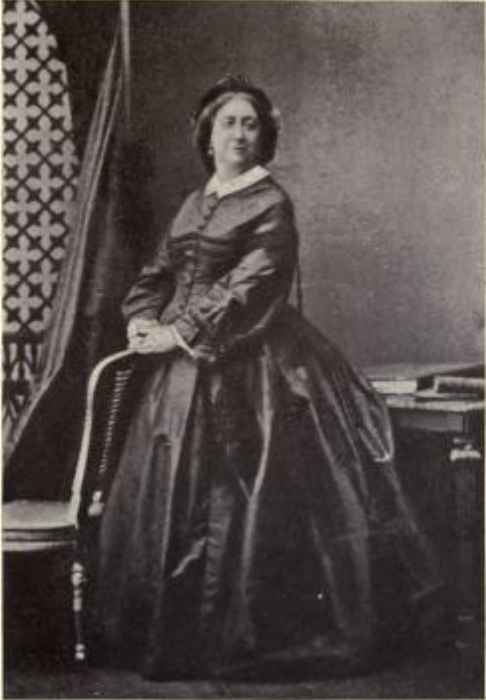
Lady Gore (Sarah Rachel Fraser)

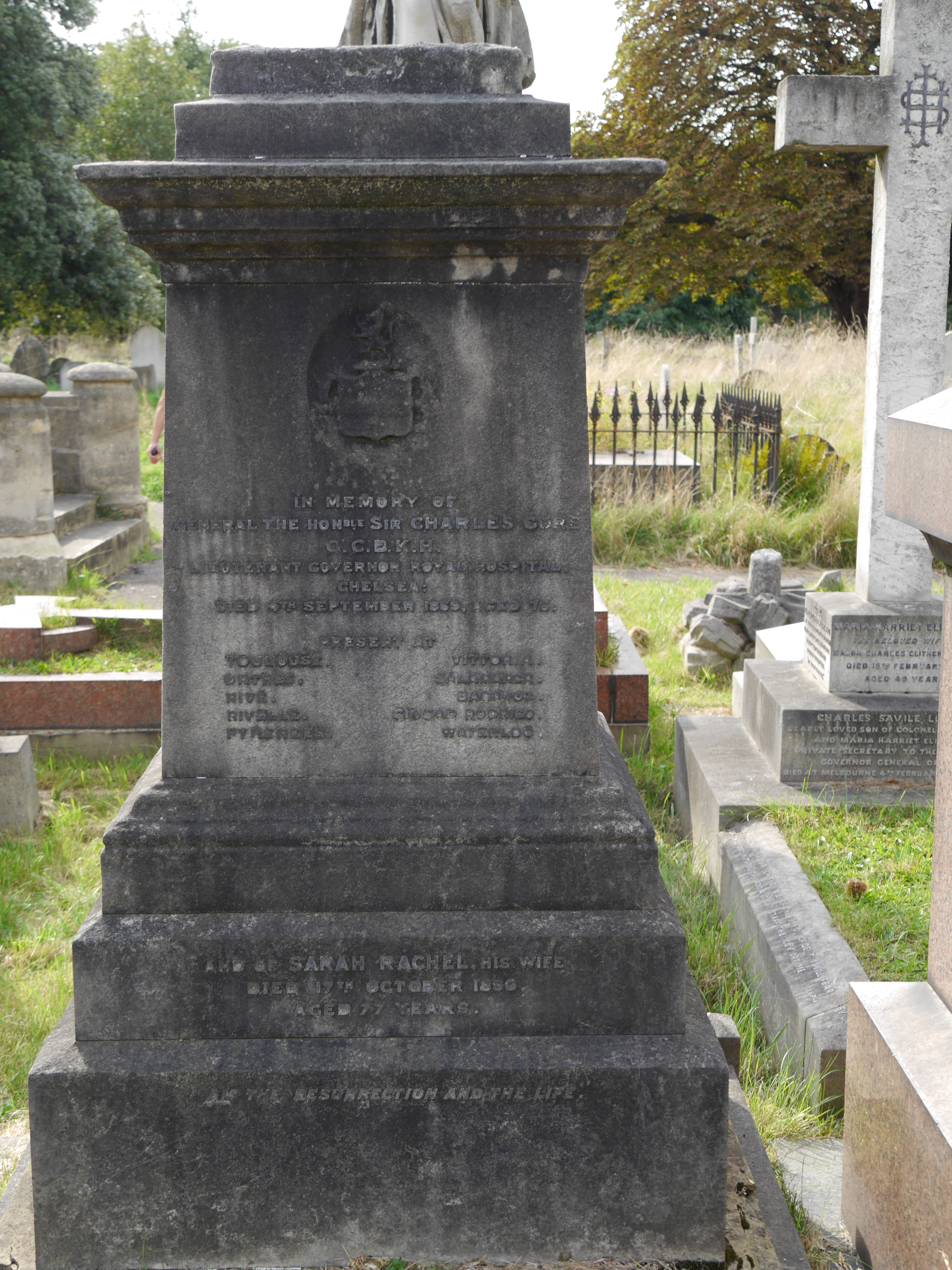
Gore's burial, Brompton Cemetery monument
