= John Cunningham (Nova Scotia politician) =

Canadian politician (1776–1847)

John Cunningham (April 27, 1776 – October 17, 1847) was a farmer, official and political figure in Nova Scotia. He represented Sydney County in the Legislative Assembly of Nova Scotia from 1808 to 1811 and from 1814 to 1818.

He was born in Halifax, Nova Scotia, the son of Richard Cunningham and Elizabeth Day, who was the daughter of John Day. Cunningham was educated at King's College in Windsor. In 1799, he married Ruth Amelia Irish, the daughter of settlers from Rhode Island. Cunningham served as a major in the militia, as a justice of the peace and as custos rotulorum. He was also an immigration agent and registrar of deeds. He was elected to the assembly in an 1808 by-election held after the election of William Allen Chipman was overturned and then again in an 1814 by-election held following the death of Samuel Hood George. Cunningham died at Antigonish Harbour at the age of 71.
