= Jeremiah Northup (Nova Scotia politician) =

Canadian politician

Jeremiah Northup (died January 1809) was a political figure in Nova Scotia. He represented Falmouth Township in the Legislative Assembly of Nova Scotia from 1773 to 1809.

He was the son of Immanuel Northup and Sarah Gould of North Kingston, Rhode Island. He was married three times: to Sophia, Zerviar and Tanya. Northup was one of the first persons granted land in Falmouth township in 1761. He served as a justice of the peace for Falmouth and for King's County. He died in office.

His grandson, also named Jeremiah Northup, served in the Nova Scotia assembly and the Canadian senate.
