= James Fraser (businessman) =

Canadian businessman and politician

James Fraser JP
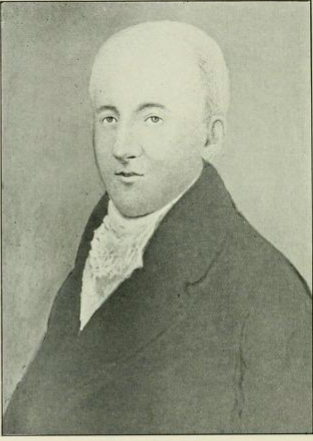

Member of the Legislative Assembly of New Brunswick for Northumberland
- In office 1795–1818

Personal details
- Born: c. 1760 Farraline, Dores, Highland, United Kingdom
- Died: 14 October 1822 (aged 61–62) Windsor, Nova Scotia
- Spouse: Rachel Otis DeWolf (after 1802)
- Children: 8
- Parent: Alexander Fraser

James Fraser JP (c. 1760 – 14 October 1822) was a Scottish-born businessman, judge and political figure in New Brunswick and Nova Scotia. He represented Northumberland County in the Legislative Assembly of New Brunswick from 1795 to 1818.

== Early life ==
He was born in Farraline, Dores, the only son of Alexander Fraser and Miss Cameron. Fraser was educated in Aberdeen and came to Nova Scotia in 1780.

== Career ==
In Nova Scotia, he helped establish a business with fellow Scot, James Thom, catching and exporting salmon in the Miramichi region of New Brunswick in 1785 and also supplied goods to people who had settled in that area. He and his partners also became involved in the timber trade and shipbuilding. Fraser also served Northumberland County as justice of the peace and justice in the Inferior Court of Common Pleas. He ran unsuccessfully for a seat in the New Brunswick Assembly in 1791 before being elected four years later, serving from 1795 to 1818.

Around 1810, although still operating in the Miramichi area, he moved his residence to Halifax. He was member of the North British Society. In 1818, he was named to Nova Scotia's Council.

== Personal life ==
In 1802, Fraser was married to Rachel Otis DeWolf (b. 1773), the daughter of Benjamin DeWolf and Rachel (née Otis) DeWolf (aunt of William Hersey Otis Haliburton through her sister of Susannah (née Otis) Haliburton). Together, they were the parents of eight children:

- Sarah Rachel Fraser (b. 1803), who married Hon. Charles Stephen Gore, third son of the Arthur Gore, 2nd Earl of Arran, in 1824.
- James DeWolf Fraser (1805–1852), who married Catharine Prescott, a daughter of Charles Ramage Prescott, in 1839.
- Harriet Amelia Fraser (1806–1880), who married Col. Dixon in 1826.
- Amelia Isabella Fraser (1808–1837)
- Frances Mary Fraser (1809–1827)
- Dr. Benjamin DeWolf Fraser (1812–1888), who married Elizabeth Coster in 1841.In 1843, Benjamin married Elizabeth Allison.
- Catharine Fraser (1813–1880), who married the Rev. Thomas G. Suther, Bishop of Aberdeen and Orkney.
- Mary Hulbert Fraser (1813–1822).

Fraser died in Windsor, Nova Scotia on 14 October 1822 and was buried in the Old Burying Ground in Halifax.

=== Descendants ===
Through his eldest daughter, he was a grandfather of Eliza Amelia Gore (1829–1916), who married William Hay, 19th Earl of Erroll in 1848 and who served as Lady-in-waiting to Queen Victoria for twenty-eight years.
