= Richard Cunningham (Canadian politician) =

Canadian politician

MLA for Yarmouth township
- In office 1779–1783

Personal details
- Born: September 14, 1748 Roscommon, Ireland
- Died: October 20, 1823 (aged 75) Antigonish Harbour, Nova Scotia
- Spouse: Elizabeth Day
- Occupation: Politician

Richard Cunningham (September 14, 1748 – October 20, 1823) was an Irish-born farmer and political figure in Nova Scotia. He represented Yarmouth Township in the Legislative Assembly of Nova Scotia from 1779 to 1783.

He was born in County Roscommon. He married Elizabeth, the daughter of John Day, in 1775. He was elected to the assembly in a 1779 by-election held after James Monk left the province. Cunningham was named clerk for the assembly in 1783. He served as a justice of the peace for Hants County. Cunningham died in Antigonish Harbour at the age of 75.

His brother John and his son John also served in the assembly.
