= Samuel Gay =

Canadian politician (1754–1847)

Samuel Gay (1754 – January 21, 1847) was a judge and political figure in New Brunswick. He represented Westmorland in the Legislative Assembly of New Brunswick from 1786 to 1792 and from 1795 to 1802.

He was born in Boston, the son of Martin Gay and Mary Pinkney, and was educated at Harvard University, graduating in 1775. Gay served as a magistrate for Westmorland County and as chief justice for the Court of Common Pleas. He died at Fort Cumberland at the age of 92.
