= Edward York (politician) =

Nova Scotian politician (1730–1790)

Edward York (April 18, 1730 – ca 1790) was a sea captain and political figure in Nova Scotia. He represented Falmouth township in the Legislative Assembly of Nova Scotia from 1771 to 1775. His name also appears as Edward Yorke.

He was born in Westerly, Rhode Island, the son of James Yorke. He was married twice: first to Hannah Larkin and then to Mary Fones in 1755. York came to Falmouth in 1761. He was a pilot in the Minas Basin. York was elected to the assembly in a 1771 by-election held after Isaac Deschamps was elected in both Newport and Falmouth, choosing to sit for Newport. His seat in the assembly was declared vacant for non-attendance in 1775. He died in Falmouth.
