= Stephen Fulton =

Stephen Fulton may refer to:

- Stephen Fulton (politician) (1810–1870), Nova Scotia merchant and politician
- Steve Fulton (born 1970), Scottish footballer
- Stephen Fulton (boxer) (born 1994), professional boxer
