= Ephraim Dean =

Canadian politician

Ephraim Dean (October 17, 1734 – January 27, 1787) was a merchant, ship owner and political figure in Nova Scotia. He represented Liverpool Township in the Nova Scotia House of Assembly from 1785 to 1787.

He was born in Barnstable, Massachusetts, the son of Thomas Dean and Lydia Cole, and later settled in Liverpool, Nova Scotia. In 1760, he married Martha Atwood Young. Dean was engaged in the trade with the West Indies and New England and also owned sawmills in the region. He was first elected to the provincial assembly in a 1768 by-election held after Elisha Freeman's resignation but apparently never took his seat. At first sympathetic to the American cause, Dean returned to the United States around 1777 but later returned to Nova Scotia and commanded the privateer Dreadnought. Dean served as a road commissioner for a road between Liverpool and Lunenburg. He died in Liverpool at the age of 53.
