= Joshua Lamb =

Canadian politician

Joshua Lamb (1731–1813) was born in Massachusetts and became a political figure in Nova Scotia. He represented Onslow Township in the Nova Scotia House of Assembly from 1770 to 1774 and in 1776.

Lamb was one of the first persons granted land in Onslow Township, Nova Scotia. He was the first registrar of deeds for Cumberland County, serving from 1770 to 1777 and also served as a justice of the peace. He was elected in 1770 to the 5th General Assembly of Nova Scotia, but was unseated for non-attendance in 1772 and 1774. He was elected again in a by-election held in February 1776. Lamb, who sympathized with the American Revolution, refused to take the oath of allegiance to the Crown. His seat in the provincial assembly was again declared vacant on June 28, 1776. He went to Canaan Plantation, Maine, (which became part of Lincolnville) in 1777 and received a land grant from Massachusetts (which still owned Maine) in 1800.

Lamb married Mercy Brooks (1743–1828) in 1766, and he died on 27 December 1813 in Lincolnville. Their son, Captain Joshua Lamb (1771–1851), built the Lincolnville Center Meeting House.
