= Martin Gay =

Canadian politician

Martin Gay (December 29, 1726 – February 3, 1809) was a metal smith and political figure in Nova Scotia. He represented Cumberland Township in the Legislative Assembly of Nova Scotia from 1783 to 1785.

He was born in Hingham, Massachusetts, the son of the Reverend Ebenezer Gay and Jerusha Bradford. Gay was married twice: first to Mary Pinckey in 1750 and then to Ruth Atkins in 1765. Gay went to Halifax in 1776 when the loyalists left Boston. He served as a justice in the Inferior Court of Common Pleas for Cumberland County. He was elected to the assembly in a 1783 by-election held after Hezekiah King's seat was declared vacant for non-attendance. Gay travelled to England in 1788 and then returned to Boston in 1792. He died there at the age of 82. His letters were published in 1898.

His brother Jotham also served in the assembly. His son Samuel served in the New Brunswick assembly.
