= Jotham Gay =

Canadian politician

Jotham Gay (April 11, 1733 – October 16, 1802) was an army officer, who served at Fort Edward (Nova Scotia), and political figure in Nova Scotia. He represented Cumberland County in the Legislative Assembly of Nova Scotia from 1772 to 1774. The son of the Reverend Ebenezer Gay and Jerusha Bradford, he was probably born in Hingham, Massachusetts. Gay received a land grant in Cumberland County in 1761. He was a colonel in the continental army, serving at Louisbourg and at Fort Beauséjour. He was elected to the assembly in a 1772 by-election held after Joshua Winslow was unseated for non-attendance. Gay later moved to Westmorland County, New Brunswick, then returned to Hingham where he died at the age of 69.

His brother Martin also served in the assembly.
