= John Day Jr. =

Canadian politician

John Day (died November 18, 1792) was a soldier and political figure in Nova Scotia. He represented Newport township in the Nova Scotia House of Assembly from 1785 to 1791.

He was the son of John Day and Henrietta Maria Cottnam. Day served as an officer in the 84th, 16th and 96th Regiments of Foot. Day was sheriff for Hants County from 1790 until his death in Newport.
