= Henry Munroe =

Canadian politician

Henry Munroe (c. 1727 – c. 1782) was a Scottish-born soldier and political figure in Nova Scotia. He represented the township of Granville in the Nova Scotia House of Assembly from 1765 to 1768. His surname also appears as Munro.

== Family ==
Janet Gunn daughter of George Gunn VI of Braemore married Rev. John Munro about 1704, with issue,

1. William, died
2. John Gun married Elizabeth Sutherland daughter of John Sutherland of Little Tarbol and Christian MacKenzie of Gruinard m 1717.
3. Sir George Gun I of Poyntzfield born before 1730 married Mary (Hinde) Poyntz, 1760.
4. Henry born before 1727, married Sarah Hooper B. March 10, 1743 in Granville, Annapolis County, Nova Scotia

Rev. Munro was minister of Halkirk from 1704 until his death in 1743.

== Career ==
Henry Munroe was born in Cromarty and joined the 77th Foot,(Montgomery's Highlanders) raised in Argyleshire for service against the French in North America. Lt. Henry Munro was wounded 14 Sept. 1758 and fought in all the major battles before returning to Granville Nova Scotia. Munroe was granted 2,000 acres (8.1 km^{2}) of land in Granville, near Annapolis Royal, Nova Scotia. He married Sarah Hooper, daughter of New England Planter, T. Hooper. The Hoopers came to Annapolis on the Charming Molly in 1760. They were originally from Massachusetts. Henry Munroe was elected by Granville Township to the 4th General Assembly of Nova Scotia in 1765. He resigned on June 21, 1768. Munroe served as a justice of the peace and a lieutenant-colonel in the local militia. He died of apoplexy 6 Jan. 1781.

== Children ==
Henry married Sarah Hooper B. March 10, 1743 in Granville, Annapolis County, Nova Scotia with issue,

1. Nancy, B. 1767, Granville, Nova Scotia, m. John Hall Apr. 29, 1791
2. George, B. 1768, Granville, Nova Scotia, m. Lucretia Chesley, Apr. 1792
3. Henry, B. 1770, Granville, Nova Scotia, m. Elizabeth Green, Jan. 4, 1806
4. Robert, B. 1774, Granville, Nova Scotia, m. Penepole Green, March 16, 1806
5. David Davidson B. 1776, Granville, Nova Scotia, m. 1 Rhoda Simpson, 1801, m. 2 Elizabeth Katherns 1815
6. John, B. 1777, Granville, Nova Scotia, m. Eva Bohacker, Mar. 7, 1799
7. Elizabeth B. 1778, Granville, Nova Scotia m. William Ruffee, Oct. 20, 1791

== Siblings' children ==
Henry's eldest brother William died without issue.

Henry's brother, Captain John Gunn Munro of Braemore married Elizabeth Sutherland. They had ten children.

1. George Gunn Munro (b. 1743) married Justina Dunbar. They had a son George.
2. John, Major, killed in American war unmarried.
3. Henry.
4. Alexander.
5. Innes, married Ann GORDON of Clyne. Their children include: Major Sir George Gun MUNRO who married Jemima Charlotte, daughter of Col. GRAHAM.
6. Christina married Col. George MACKENZIE of Lochend.
7. Ann was the first of four wives of Rev. Robert ARTHUR of Buchan. He was born in 1744 and died May 11, 1821.
8. Jenny married William SUTHERLAND, Sheriff of Sutherland.
9. Alexandrina died unmarried
10. Margaret married Captain John MACKENZIE 5th of Gruinard.

Henry's brother Sir George Gunn Munro m. Mary (Molly) Poyntz May 29, 1760. Her first marriage was to George Hinde, Dec 1, 1747. George Hinde and Mary (Molly) Poyntz were married by licence in the Chapel Royal, St James 1747. The licence indicates Mary Poyntz was 25 in 1747. She was born in 1722 and died in 1785. George Hinde was a merchant agent in Jamaica for the firm of Augustus and Boyd of London. He died July 1, 1756. Mary (Molly) Poyntz's parents were Deane Poyntz (b. April 3, 1687) and Florence Fulton. Sir George purchased lands in Ardoch, Scotland and renamed the area Poyntzfield in honour of his wife. Sir George Gunn Munro died circa January, 1785.

1. From Registry of Tailies National Archives of Scotland RT 1/22 F169R-187
2. Deed of Entail to Heirs Male executed by Sir George Gun Munro and Lady Munro in London on 8.7.1783.22

At Edinburgh the Eighteenth day of December one thousand Seven hundred and eighty three years. Anent the Petition given in and presented to the Lords of Council and Session for and in the name of Sir George Munro of Poyntzfield Humbly Shewing That the petitioner has of the date the Eighth day of July one thousand Seven hundred and eighty three with consent of Mary Lady Munro his Wife execute a Deed of Entail whereby he gives Grants Alienates and Disposes in favour of the heirs male procreate of his body in his present marriage with the said Lady Munro and the heirs male of their bodies; whom failing to the other heirs male to be procreated of his body in any Subsequent marriage and the heirs male of their bodies, whom failing to the daughters or heirs female procreate or to be procreate of [169v] his body in his present marriage with the said Lady Munro his wife and the heirs male of their bodies the Eldest daughter or heir female excluding always heirs partioners and Succeeding without division, whom failing to the other heirs therein mentioned whom all failing to such other heirs and Member of Taillie as he should thereafter nominate and appoint by writing under his hand Signed Mr. William Hanyman, Advocate procurator for the Petitioner and the Deed of Entail therein referred to being Judicially produced to their Lordships They Interponed and hereby Interpone their authority thereto and Decerned and Ordained and hereby Decern and Ordain the same to be recorded in the particular Register for that purpose [170v] terms of the Act [1685], of which Deeds of Entail the tenor follows,

Know All Men by these presents That I, Sir George Munro of Poyntzfield in the County of Cromarty, Heritable proprietor of the lands Barony and others and with the consent of Mary Lady Munro my wife Have Given Granted Alienated and Disponed from me my heirs and Successors in the lands Barony and others To and in favour of the heirs male procreated or to be procreated of my body in my present Marriage with the said Lady Munro my wife and the heirs male of their bodies

1. whom failing to George Gun Munro my nephew and the heirs male of his body,
2. whom failing to my nephew Innis Munro of the said George Gun Munro and the heirs male of his body,
3. whom failing to my nephew George Munro eldest son of my deceased Brother Henry Munro [d. 1781, Granville, Annapolis County, Nova Scotia] and to the heirs male of his body
4. whom failing to Henry Munro [B. 1770], Second Son of my said brother Henry Munro and the heirs male of his body,
5. whom failing to John Munro, Third Son of my said brother Henry Munro and the heirs male of his body,
6. whom failing to Robert Poyntz Munro Fourth Son of my said brother Henry Munro and the heirs male of his body, (See pages 548 and 549, History of the Munros of Fowlis with genealogies of the principal families of the name, ALEXANDER MACKENZIE, 1898)
7. whom failing to David Davidson Munro Fifth Son of my said brother Henry Munro and the heirs male of his body,
8. whom failing to my Nephew Colin Graham of Drynie Esquire and the heirs male of his body,
9. whom failing to my Nephew Alexander Graham brother of the said Colin Graham and the heirs male of his body,

All and Sundry the lands Barony and others aftermentioned That is to say All and whole the lands of Ardoch, Teaninich Blairnaclach Colins Croft and particles of Land or Spot of Ground called Badaffin lying within the parish of Kirkmichael and Shire of Cromarty But with and under the Burden of the Liferent to Lady Munro of All and whole the Lands and others above mentioned in case she shall survive me,

Witness William Poyntz of Midgham in the County of Berks Witness Reverend Charles Poyntz of North Creek in the County of Norfolk

From George Gun Munro's Vicar General Marriage License Allegation May 26, 1760 he was stated a bachelor of thirty years identifying him as being born before 1730. Sir George Gun Munro and Mary (Poyntz) Hinde married May 29, 1760 Court Session Papers [SP394/14] A petition stating both Sir George Gun Munro and Lady Mary died in 1785,

Henry's nephew Col. Innis Munro was appointed to a lieutenancy in the 73rd Highlanders. This Regiment later became the 71st Highlanders. Col. Innis Munro resigned from the army in 1808. He died in 1827. Col. Innis married Ann, daughter of Rev. George Gordon of Clyne. She died Feb. 19, 1836, age 95 years. Col. Innis was succeeded by his son Major George Gunn Munro born 1788. He died in 1852. Major Sir George Gunn Munro was the fourth laird of Poyntzfield.

1. The first laird was, Sir George Gunn Munro, (born before 1730), son of Janet Gunn of Braemore and Rev. John Munro of Halkirk, Caithness, Scotland.
2. He was followed by Sir George Gunn Munro's nephew, born to his brother, Capt. John Gun and Elizabeth Sutherland of Braemore. Nephew George Gunn Munro born 1743, died July 1, 1806, age 63. George Gunn Munro married Justina Dunbar, June 8, 1787. Justina was the daughter of William Dunbar, Forres. She was born 11/02/1759, baptized Feb. 11, 1760. Her death was published in the Inverness Journal Friday, Nov. 4, 1825. They did not have children. George Gun Munro (born 1743) had an illegitimate son with Ann (Bain) Bailey while married to Justina Dunbar. This was the Hon. George Gun Munro that was born in 1785. He went to Grenada and became prominent holding the offices of Assistant Justice of the Supreme Court, Senior Member of the council, Public Treasurer of the Colony of Grenada, died in Grenada. A death notice was published in the Inverness Journal, Friday 19 Feb, 1830.
3. Sir George Gunn Munro's nephew, born to his brother, Capt. John Gun and Elizabeth Sutherland, Col. Innis Munro, B. 1744 D. Friday, 26 Jan, 1827 Death Notice in Inverness Journal, succeeded his nephew, George Gunn Munro, b. 1743.
4. Upon Col. Innis Gunn Munro's death in 1827 his son, Major George Gunn Munro succeeded to Poyntzfield and became the fourth Laird. He married Jemima Charlotte Graham in 1822. Jemima Charlotte Graham had been married to Francis Graham, B. Oct. 17, 1778, son of Alexander Graham of Drynie (in the Black Isle), near Dingwall, and Donna Ighaive. Alexander Graham was the British Consul at Faial (Fayal), the Azores. Francis Graham, their son, went to Jamaica in April 1797. Francis Graham returned to Scotland, leaving Jamaica July 16, 1812 to marry his cousin Jemima Charlotte, the third daughter of lieutenant colonel Colin Dundas Graham of the Scots Brigade. They married at Edinburgh castle, in 1813. Francis and Jemima Charlotte then returned to Jamaica, with issue Colin and Agnes. The children predeceased them. Francis Graham died January 2, 1820. Following Francis Graham's death, his widow Jemima Charlotte, married Major George Gun Munro of Poyntzfield, Scotland, in 1822. Major George Gunn Munro was knighted in 1842. Major, Sir George Gunn Munro died at Strathpeffer Spa in Sept., 1852. Jemima Charlotte Munro's death was published in the Inverness Advertiser April 26, 1857.
