= William Freeman (politician) =

Nova Scotian politician

William Freeman (c. 1741 – c. 1801) was a land surveyor and political figure in Nova Scotia. He represented Amherst Township from 1783 to 1785 and Cumberland County from 1793 to 1799 in the Legislative Assembly of Nova Scotia.

He was living in Amherst township in 1770. Freeman served as registrar of deeds for Cumberland County. He was first elected to the assembly in a 1783 by-election, the first election held for Amherst Township. He was re-elected in 1785, but the election was declared invalid Dec. 9,1785, as he was no longer an inhabitant. He was elected in 1793 for Cumberland County, serving through 1799. His death was reported in the minutes for the Council on May 18, 1801.
