= Isaac Wilkins =

Canadian politician (1743–1830)

Isaac Wilkins (1743–1830) was a judge and political figure in Nova Scotia. He represented Shelburne Township in the Nova Scotia House of Assembly from 1785 to 1793.

He was born in Jamaica, the son of Martin Wilkins. He was educated at King's College in New York City (now Columbia University), receiving a D.D. He served as a member of the General Assembly of New York until 1775. He married Isabella Morris, the sister of Lewis Morris, in 1762. In 1783, he settled in Shelburne, Nova Scotia. He served as a judge in the Inferior Court of Common Pleas. Around 1800, Wilkins returned to Westchester County, New York, serving as rector of a church there. He died in New York.

His son Lewis Morris Wilkins also served in the provincial assembly.
