= Thomas Dixson =

Canadian politician

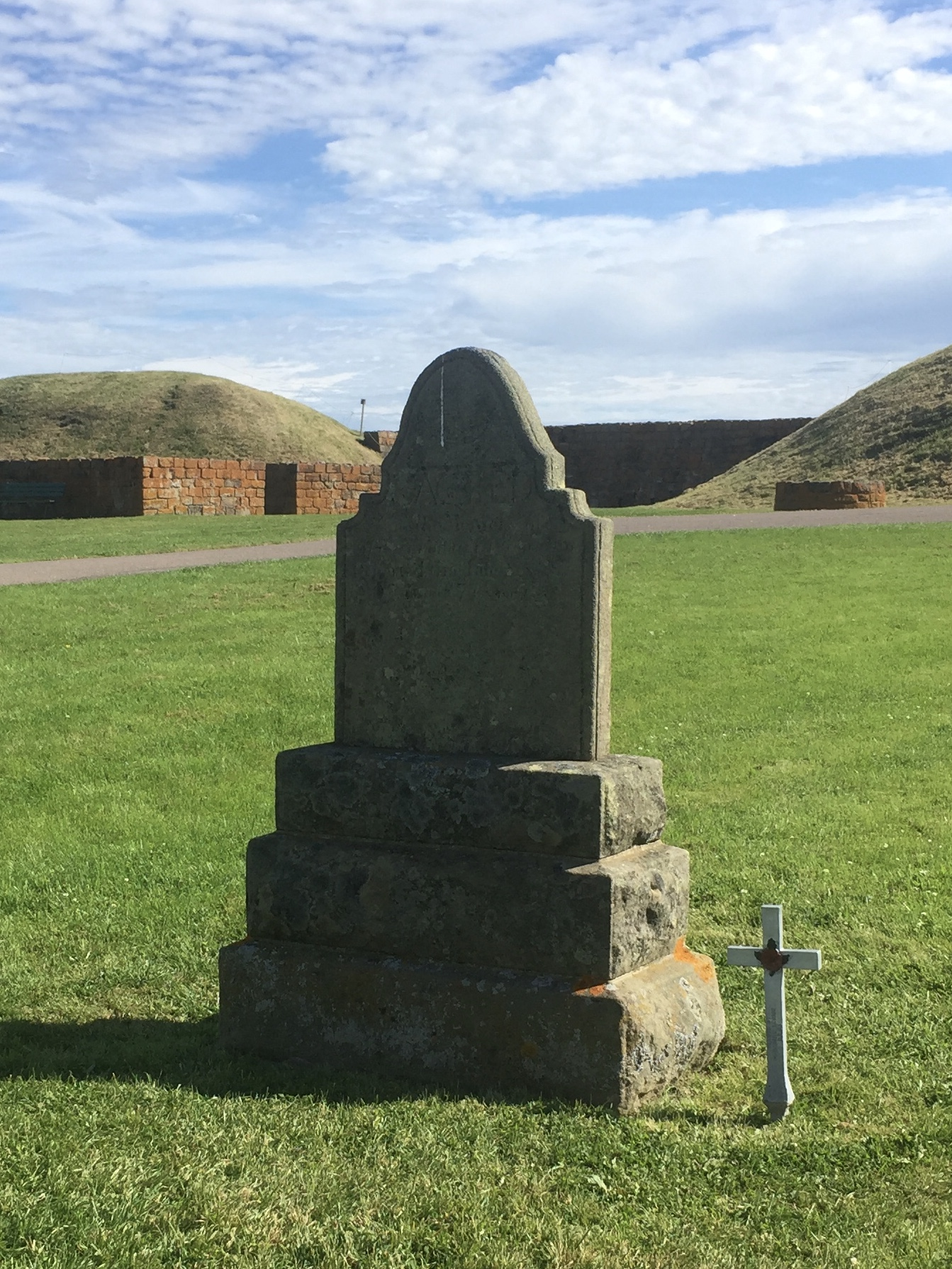
Thomas Dixson Grave, Fort Cumberland, New Brunswick

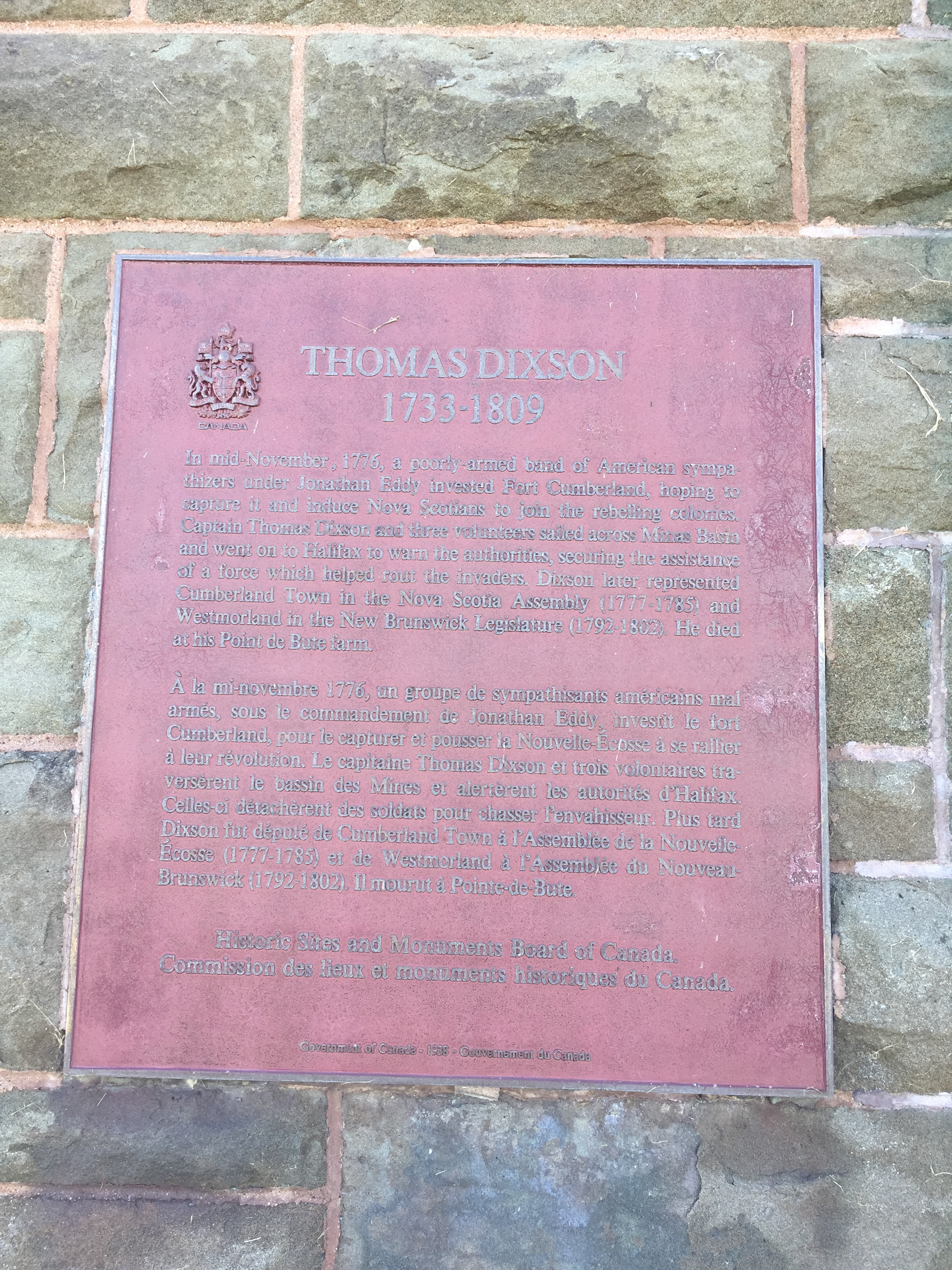
Thomas Dixson Plaque, Fort Cumberland, New Brunswick

Thomas Dixson (also Thomas Dickson, c. May 3, 1733 – November 8, 1809) was a British colonial militiaman and politician serving in Canada.

== Early life ==
The year and location of Thomas Dixson's birth is not clear. As a young child, the Dixsons moved to Norwich, Connecticut.

== French and Indian War ==
During the French and Indian War, Dixson moved to Fort Cumberland, Nova Scotia, soon after, and served as a militiaman in the capture of Fort Beauséjour in 1755.

Dixson also served with Amherst at Montreal in 1760 and with Monckton in Havana in 1762.

== American Revolution ==
In 1776, during the American Revolutionary War, a band of revolutionaries led by Jonathan Eddy attempted to capture Fort Cumberland (Fort Beauséjour) as part of an effort to provoke Nova Scotia into joining the revolution against British control of the colonies. To resist this siege, known as the Battle of Fort Cumberland, Captain Dixson sailed himself and three volunteers in a small open boat across the Minas Basin (known for some of the highest tides on Earth), part of the Bay of Fundy, to warn the authorities in Halifax and bring reinforcements to the loyalists' aid. For this effort, Dixson was named a Person of National Historic Significance in 1938.

On 20 August 1776, Dixson was elected a Member of the Legislative Assembly of Nova Scotia in a by-election to represent Cumberland County. In October 1778, Dixson became a Justice of the Peace for Cumberland County. In 1785, Dixson's term as a Nova Scotia Legislative Assembly member ended when New Brunswick separated from Nova Scotia. Dixson was subsequently elected to the same position he had held previously in the Legislative Assembly of New Brunswick, representing Westmoreland County. In 1802, Dixson retired from politics, and died on November 8, 1809, at Point de Bute, New Brunswick. He was survived by his wife and their eleven children.

== Family ==
At some point prior to 1761, Dixson travelled south to Massachusetts and met Catherine Wethered (or 'Weatherhead'), whom he married in Kings Chapel in Boston on April 9 that year. That same year, Dixson received a land grant at Fort Beauséjour, but later moved to Point de Bute, New Brunswick.

His half-brother Charles and his son Thomas Law also served in the Nova Scotia assembly.

== See also ==
- Nova Scotia in the American Revolution
