= William Fisher (Nova Scotia politician) =

Nova Scotian politician (1716–1777)

William Fisher (1716 – July 6, 1777) was an Irish-born politician and political figure in Nova Scotia. He represented Truro Township in the Legislative Assembly of Nova Scotia from 1770 to 1774.

He was born in Derry and immigrated to New England, later moving to Truro, Nova Scotia in 1761. Around 1743, he married Eleanor Archibald. Elected to the 5th General Assembly of Nova Scotia in 1770, Fisher's seat was declared vacant for non-attendance in July 8, 1772; he was reelected in Feb. 4, 1773 and his seat was again declared vacant Dec. 10, 1774. He died in Truro three years later.
