= Martin Isaac Wilkins =

Canadian politician

Martin Isaac Wilkins (September 14, 1804 – August 16, 1881) was a lawyer and political figure in Nova Scotia, Canada. He represented Pictou Township in the Nova Scotia House of Assembly from 1851 to 1859 and from 1867 to 1871.

He was born in Halifax, Nova Scotia, the son of Lewis Morris Wilkins and Sarah Creighton. He studied at King's College in Windsor, was admitted to the bar in 1828 and set up practice in Pictou. Wilkins married Jane Mortimer (Wallace). He was editor for the Pictou Observer. He was the province's solicitor general from 1857 to 1859. Wilkins was opposed to Confederation. In 1867, he published a pamphlet that argued that Confederation was unconstitutional. He served as the province's attorney general from 1867 to 1871. Wilkins was named protonotary for the province's Supreme Court in Halifax in 1871. He died in Halifax at the age of 76.

His brother Lewis Morris Wilkins also served in the province's assembly.
