= John Bolman =

Canadian politician

John D. Bolman (1751 – September 17, 1833) was a German-born medical doctor, surgeon and political figure in Nova Scotia. He represented Lunenburg Township in the Nova Scotia House of Assembly from 1793 to 1809.

He was born in Magdeburg. Bolman served in a Hessian regiment during the American Revolution. In 1782, he married Jane Knaut (née Brimner), the widow of Philip Augustus Knaut. Bolman settled in Lunenburg, Nova Scotia and died there in 1833, 54 years later.
