= Nathaniel Freeman (Nova Scotia politician) =

Nova Scotian politician (1740–1795)

Nathaniel Freeman (March 5, 1740 – June 17, 1795) was a merchant and political figure in Nova Scotia. He represented Queen's County in the Legislative Assembly of Nova Scotia from 1780 to 1783.

He was born in Rochester, Massachusetts. He was elected to the assembly in a 1780 by-election held after the death of William Smith. Freeman's seat was declared vacant in 1783 for non-attendance. He died in Liverpool at the age of 55.
