= John Doggett (politician) =

Canadian politician

John Doggett (February 6, 1723 – March 20, 1772) was a merchant, seaman and political figure in Nova Scotia. He represented Granville Township in the Nova Scotia House of Assembly from 1770 to 1772.

He was born in Plymouth, Massachusetts, the son of Captain John Doggett and Jemima Turner. In 1748 he married Abigail House. By that time, he was living in Scituate, where he worked first as a ship's captain and then as a ferry operator. In 1759 he received a grant of land in Liverpool township, Nova Scotia. He established a store and was part owner of a sawmill. In 1760 he was named a justice of the peace and he also served as customs collector and major in the local militia. In 1764 he was named judge of the Inferior Court of Common Pleas and registrar for Queen's County. On August 17, 1768, he was elected to the 4th General Assembly of Nova Scotia for Queens County, but it is unclear if he actually took his seat. In 1771 he became lieutenant-colonel in the county militia. He died on Port Mouton Island after being ill for some time, possibly having been quarantined on the island. His descendants still remain in the local area of White Point, Nova Scotia.
