= Jonathan Hoar =

Canadian politician

Johnathan Hoar (ca 1720–after 1770) was a soldier, judge and political figure in Nova Scotia. He was a member of the Nova Scotia House of Assembly representing Annapolis County from 1759 to 1760 and Annapolis Township from 1765 to 1770. He was born in Concord, Massachusetts, the son of Lieutenant Daniel Hoar, and was educated at Harvard College. Hoar served with Samuel Waldo during the capture of Louisbourg. He was named a judge in the Court of Common Pleas in 1762. In 1767, he became surrogate judge of probate for Annapolis. He took ill and died after leaving the Annapolis area. According to some sources, Hoar was named governor of Newfoundland but died at sea before assuming that post.
