= John Huston (Nova Scotia politician) =

Canadian politician

John Huston (1710–1795) was a farmer, soldier, merchant and politician in Nova Scotia. He represented Cumberland Township from 1759 to 1760 and Cumberland County from 1770 to 1774 in the Nova Scotia House of Assembly.

He served at the siege of Louisbourg in 1745. Huston was deputy surveyor for Cumberland County. In 1759, he was named a justice of the peace. He served as a captain in the militia and probate judge. Huston was foster father to Brook Watson. His seat in the assembly was declared vacant in 1774 for non-attendance. He died at the age of 85 in Canard.
