= Jeremiah Northup =

Canadian politician

The Honourable Jeremiah Northup
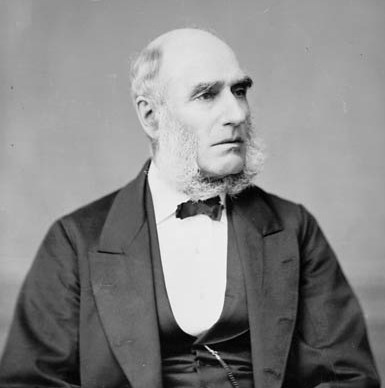

Senator for Halifax, Nova Scotia
- In office October 10, 1870 – April 10, 1879
- Appointed by: John A. Macdonald

Personal details
- Born: 1816 Falmouth, Nova Scotia
- Died: April 10, 1879 (aged 62–63)
- Party: Liberal

Jeremiah Northup (1816 – April 10, 1879) was a Canadian merchant, shipowner, and politician.

Born in Falmouth, Nova Scotia, the son of John Northup and Agnes Harvey, he had ownership of at least seven ships during his lifetime. In 1867, he was elected to the Nova Scotia House of Assembly as an anti-confederate. He was appointed to the Senate of Canada in 1870 representing the senatorial division of Halifax, Nova Scotia. A Liberal, he served until his death in 1879.
