= John Fillis =

Canadian politician

John Fillis (c. 1724 – July 16, 1792) was a merchant and political figure in Nova Scotia. He was a member of the 1st General Assembly of Nova Scotia and later represented Halifax County from 1768 to 1770, Barrington Township from 1772 to 1785 and Halifax Township from 1785 to 1792. He was accused of being an American Patriot and led the efforts against Governor Francis Legge.

He was born in Boston, Massachusetts, the son of John Fillis, and came to Nova Scotia around 1751. He had married Elizabeth Stoddard in 1747. Fillis established a shipping business based in Halifax, with a branch in Boston. He also set up a distillery in Halifax. In 1756, he married Sarah Cleveland (Rudduck). Fillis was also a justice of the peace. He died in office in Halifax. He is buried in the Old Burying Ground (Halifax, Nova Scotia).

== See also ==
Nova Scotia in the American Revolution
