= John Newton (Nova Scotia politician) =

Canadian politician

John Newton (1727 – August 22, 1811) was a surveyor, official and political figure in Nova Scotia. He served as a member of the 2nd General Assembly of Nova Scotia for Annapolis Township and then represented Halifax County from 1770 to 1772 and Lunenburg County 1775–1785.

He was the son of Hibbert Newton and Hannah Adams, the daughter of John Adams. Newton served as collector of impost and excise at Halifax and as a justice of the peace. He was married twice: first to Margaret, the daughter of Benjamin Green (Margaret is buried in the Old Burying Ground (Halifax, Nova Scotia)), in 1759 and then to Catherine, the daughter of Philip Augustus Knaut, in 1775. His seat in the assembly was declared vacant in 1772 due to non-attendance.

His brother Henry also served in the assembly and married a daughter of Benjamin Green.
