= Philip Augustus Knaut =

Canadian politician

Philip Augustus Knaut (1716 – December 28, 1781) was a German-born merchant and political figure in Nova Scotia. He was a member of the 1st to 5th Nova Scotia House of Assembly from 1758 to 1781, representing Lunenburg.

He was born in the Electorate of Saxony and first came to Nova Scotia with Edward Cornwallis in 1749. In 1750, he married Anna Grob. Knaut settled in Lunenburg in 1753, where he became one of the first shopkeepers there. He was justice of the peace, an officer in the militia and coroner; he also operated a sawmill. Benjamin Gerrish chose Knaut as his agent at Lunenburg for trading with the First Nations people. Knaut married Jane Brimner in 1781 after the death of his first wife. He died in office in Lunenburg. John Newton, collector of impost and excise at Halifax, who had married Knaut's daughter Catherine, inherited control of Knaut's estate.

His widow married John Bolman, who also served in the provincial assembly.
