= Lewis Morris Wilkins =

Canadian politician

Lewis Morris Wilkins (May 24, 1801 – March 15, 1885) was a lawyer, judge and political figure in Nova Scotia. He represented Windsor Township from 1833 to 1838 and from 1852 to 1856 and Hants County from 1843 to 1847 in the Nova Scotia House of Assembly. Born in Halifax, Nova Scotia, (the son of Lewis Morris Wilkins and Sarah Creighton, the sister of Lewis Morris) and brother Martin Isaac), Wilkins was educated in Windsor, Nova Scotia at King's Collegiate School and King's College. He was admitted to the bar in 1823 and set up practice in Windsor. Wilkins married Sarah Rachel Thomas in 1828.

In 1838, he was named to the Legislative Council of Nova Scotia, serving until 1843. Although Wilkins ran as a reformer in 1843, in the assembly he opposed responsible government. He served as a minister without portfolio in the Nova Scotia Executive Council in 1846. Wilkins was defeated when he ran for reelection in 1847. Elected as a Conservative in 1852, he switched his alliance to Joseph Howe and the Liberals in 1854. He was named to the Executive Council as provincial secretary in 1854. In 1856, Wilkins was named a puisne judge in the Supreme Court of Nova Scotia, serving on the bench until 1876. He died in Windsor at the age of 84.
