= John Morrison (blacksmith) =

Canadian politician

John Morrison (September 20, 1726 – December 27, 1816) was a farmer, blacksmith and political figure in Nova Scotia. He represented Londonderry Township in the Legislative Assembly of Nova Scotia from 1770 to 1777.

He was born in New Hampshire, the son of John Morrison and Margaret Wallace, and came to Truro in 1760. Morrison married Martha Anderson, a native of Scotland. He was elected to the 5th General Assembly of Nova Scotia for Londonderry Township in 1770, but his seat was declared vacant for non-attendance on July 8, 1772. He was reelected the following year and took his seat Nov. 1,1774, but then left for New Hampshire in 1777. He returned to Nova Scotia in 1783. He died in Londonderry at the age of 90.

His grandson Thomas Fletcher Morrison later served in the assembly and the Legislative Council for Nova Scotia.
