= Lewis Morris Wilkins (speaker) =

Canadian politician

Lewis Morris Wilkins (ca 1768 – January 3, 1848) was a lawyer, judge and political figure in Nova Scotia. He represented Lunenburg County in the Nova Scotia House of Assembly from 1799 to 1817. Wilkins was speaker for the Nova Scotia assembly from 1806 to 1817.

He was born in Morrisania (later part of New York City) the son of the Isaac Wilkins and Isabella Morris, who was the sister of Lewis Morris, and came to Shelburne, Nova Scotia with his family in 1784. Wilkins became a lieutenant in the Lunenburg township militia in 1793. He admitted to the Nova Scotia bar around 1798. In 1799, he married Sarah, the daughter of John Creighton. He was sheriff of Halifax County from 1798 to 1804. Wilkins then entered the practice of law in Halifax, Lunenbrug County and Pictou district. In 1816, he was named an assistant judge in the Supreme Court of Nova Scotia and resigned from the assembly the following year. Wilkins died at home in Windsor, Nova Scotia in 1848.

His sons Lewis Morris and Martin Isaac both went on to serve in the Nova Scotia assembly.
