= Charles Dickson (soldier) =

Canadian politician

Charles Dickson (d. ca 1784) was a soldier, land owner and political figure in Nova Scotia. He represented Horton Township in the Legislative Assembly of Nova Scotia from 1767 to 1776.

He was the son of William Dickson (also spelled Dixon), with roots in northern Ireland. Dickson came to Nova Scotia from Connecticut. He married his second wife Miriam Ingersoll in 1747. Dickson led a company during the Siege of Beauséjour in 1755. He settled in Horton township in 1761. Dickson was elected to the assembly in a 1767 by-election held after William Welch's seat was declared vacant. He resigned his seat in the assembly in 1776 due to illness. He died in Horton township several years later.

His half-brother Thomas also served in the assembly.
