= John Harris (surveyor) =

Canadian surveyor and politician

John Harris (– Spring 1772) was a farmer, land surveyor and political figure in Nova Scotia. He represented Annapolis County in the Nova Scotia House of Assembly from 1762 to 1770 and Granville Township from 1770 to 1772.

He came to Nova Scotia from Massachusetts and was one of the first people granted land in Annapolis County following the expulsion of the Acadians in 1755. Harris was a crown lands surveyor. He was elected to the provincial assembly in a 1762 by-election held after the death of John Steele. He died in office.
