= John Butler (Nova Scotia politician) =

Canadian politician

John Butler (before 1749 – October 25, 1791) was a businessman and political figure in Nova Scotia. He represented Halifax County in the Nova Scotia House of Assembly from 1762 to 1772.

Probably born in England, Butler came to Halifax in 1749 by way of Long Island, New York. He built the Great Pontack Inn in Halifax. Butler acted as agent for the English firm Watson and Rashleigh, and Joshua Mauger, who operated distilleries. In 1772, he was named to the Nova Scotia Council. In 1774, he was named justice in the Inferior Court of Common Pleas and a lieutenant-colonel for the militia, later becoming a full colonel. In 1776, with others, he forced the recall of governor Francis Legge. Butler left Nova Scotia around 1781 and died in England at Martock, Somersetshire.
