= Thomas Lusby =

Canadian politician

Thomas Lusby (1737 – February 10, 1801) was an English-born farmer, judge and political figure in Nova Scotia. He represented Amherst Township in the Nova Scotia House of Assembly from 1793 to 1801.

He was born in Wrawley, Lincolnshire. In 1763, he married Mary Abbot. Lusby came to Nova Scotia around 1772. He operated a grist mill. In 1799, he was named a judge in the Inferior Court of Common Pleas for Cumberland County. He died in office in Amherst.
