= Archibald Hinshelwood =

Canadian politician

Archibald Hinshelwood (died 1773) was a lawyer, merchant and political figure in Nova Scotia. He briefly sat on the 1st General Assembly of Nova Scotia in April 1759, but his election was disputed. He was a member of subsequent assemblies from 1759 to 1773, representing Lunenburg County from 1761 to 1765 and from 1770 to 1773, and Lunenburg Township from 1765 to 1770. His name also appears as Hinchelwood.

Hinshelwood came to Halifax as a clerk for Edward Cornwallis in 1749. The spy Thomas Pichon, also known as Thomas Tyrell, was placed in Hinshelwood's custody during his stay at Halifax. He was first elected to the provincial assembly in a by-election held in 1759 but he was unseated after an appeal; Hinshelwood was elected in the general election that followed later that same year. He also served as a registrar for the court of probate and a justice of the peace for Halifax County. In October 1754, he joined the Union Fire-Club of Halifax, which had the distinction of being the first organized fire company in Canada. In 1772, he was named customs collector for Halifax. Hinshelwood was deputy provincial secretary and clerk of assembly. In 1773, he had been recommended for a seat in the province's Council, to replace Sebastian Zouberbuhler, but he died in the autumn of that year.
