= Elisha Freeman =

Canadian politician

Elisha Freeman (December 9, 1701 – May 19, 1777) was a merchant, judge and political figure in Nova Scotia. He represented Liverpool township in the Nova Scotia House of Assembly from 1765 to 1767.

He was born in Eastham, Massachusetts, the son of Samuel Freeman and Bathsheba Lothrop. In 1725, he married Lydia Freeman. Around 1760, he went to Liverpool, Nova Scotia. Freeman owned a sawmill there. He was the first town clerk for Liverpool and also served as a justice of the peace. In 1764, he was named a justice in the Inferior Court of Common Pleas for Queen's County. Freeman was also named a judge of probate in the same year. He resigned his seat in the provincial assembly on October 19, 1767, due to age. He died in Liverpool at the age of 75.
