= John Burbidge =

Canadian politician

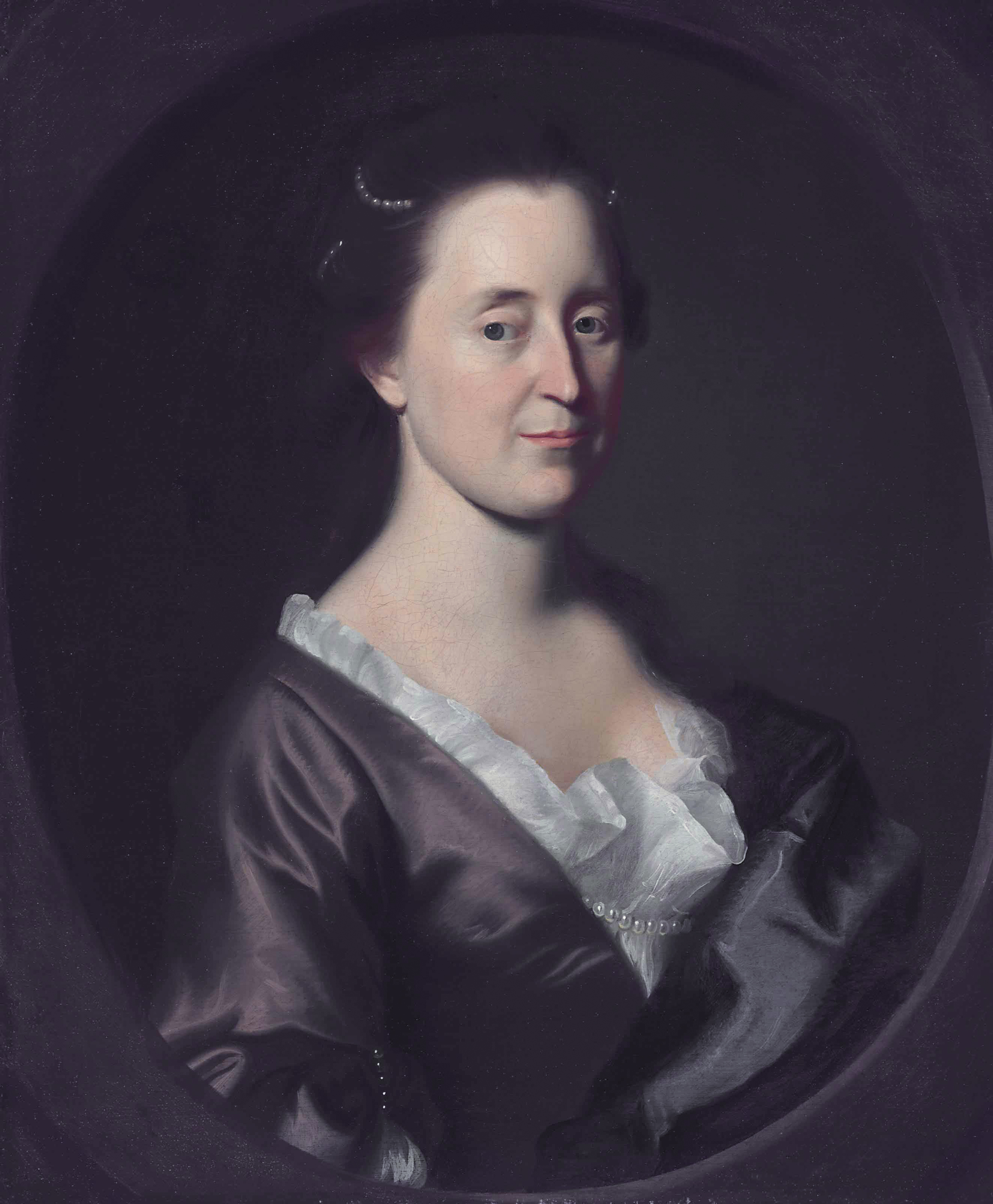
Rebecca Dudley Gerrish, Burbidge's second wife. Painting by John Singleton Copley, c. 1763–66.

John Burbidge (c.1718 – March 11, 1812) was a soldier, land owner, judge and political figure in Nova Scotia. He was a member of the 1st General Assembly of Nova Scotia in 1758 and represented Halifax Township from 1759 to 1765 and Cornwallis Township from 1765 to 1775 in subsequent assemblies.

He was born in Cowes, England, and was at Louisbourg in 1747 and at Halifax, Nova Scotia in 1749, when it was founded. In 1761, he became a justice of the peace for Halifax County and, in 1762, became captain in the local militia. Around 1764, he settled at Cornwallis where he acquired a large farm. He married Rebecca Dudley, the widow of Benjamin Gerrish, in 1775; his first wife was named Elizabeth. Burbidge became a major in the local militia, a justice of the peace and a customs collector in King's County. In 1776, he was named a judge for the Inferior Court of Common Pleas. Burbidge donated land and money to build an Anglican church in Cornwallis.

In 1790, he freed his slaves, also providing them with clothes and having them taught to read. He died in Cornwallis in 1812.

== See also ==
- Decline of slavery in Nova Scotia
