= William Smith (Nova Scotia politician) =

Canadian politician

William Smith (died June 24, 1779) was a tea merchant, judge and political figure in Nova Scotia. He represented Queen's County in the Legislative Assembly of Nova Scotia from 1765 to 1779. He was the only judge dismissed from Government service on the basis of joining the rebellion during the American Revolution (1775). He was re-instated in 1777.

He was an agent for Apthorp and Hancock of Boston. Smith served as an ensign in Captain John Gorham's Rangers. He was a justice of the peace and a judge in the Inferior Court of Common Pleas for Halifax County. He died in office in Halifax.

== See also ==
- Nova Scotia in the American Revolution
