= Benjamin Gerrish =

Canadian politician

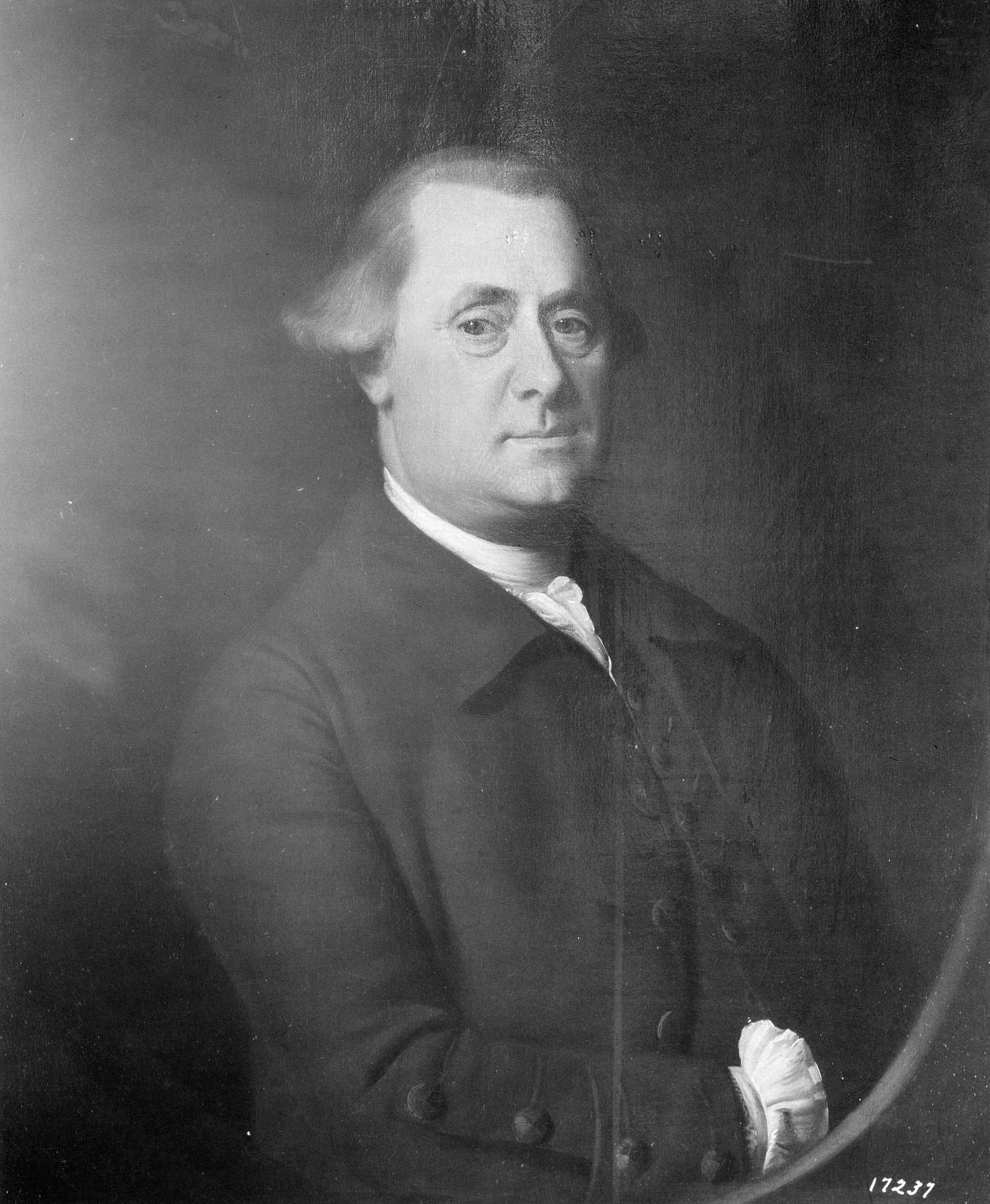
- Portrait by John Singleton Copley (c. 1770)
- Born: October 19, 1717; Boston, Massachusetts Bay
- Died: May 6, 1772 (aged 54); Southampton, England

Member of the Nova Scotia House of Assembly
- In office 1759–1768

Benjamin Gerrish (October 19, 1717 – May 6, 1772) was a merchant and political figure in Nova Scotia. He was a member of the Nova Scotia House of Assembly from 1759 to 1768.

He was born in Boston, Massachusetts, the son of John Gerrish and Sarah Hobbes.

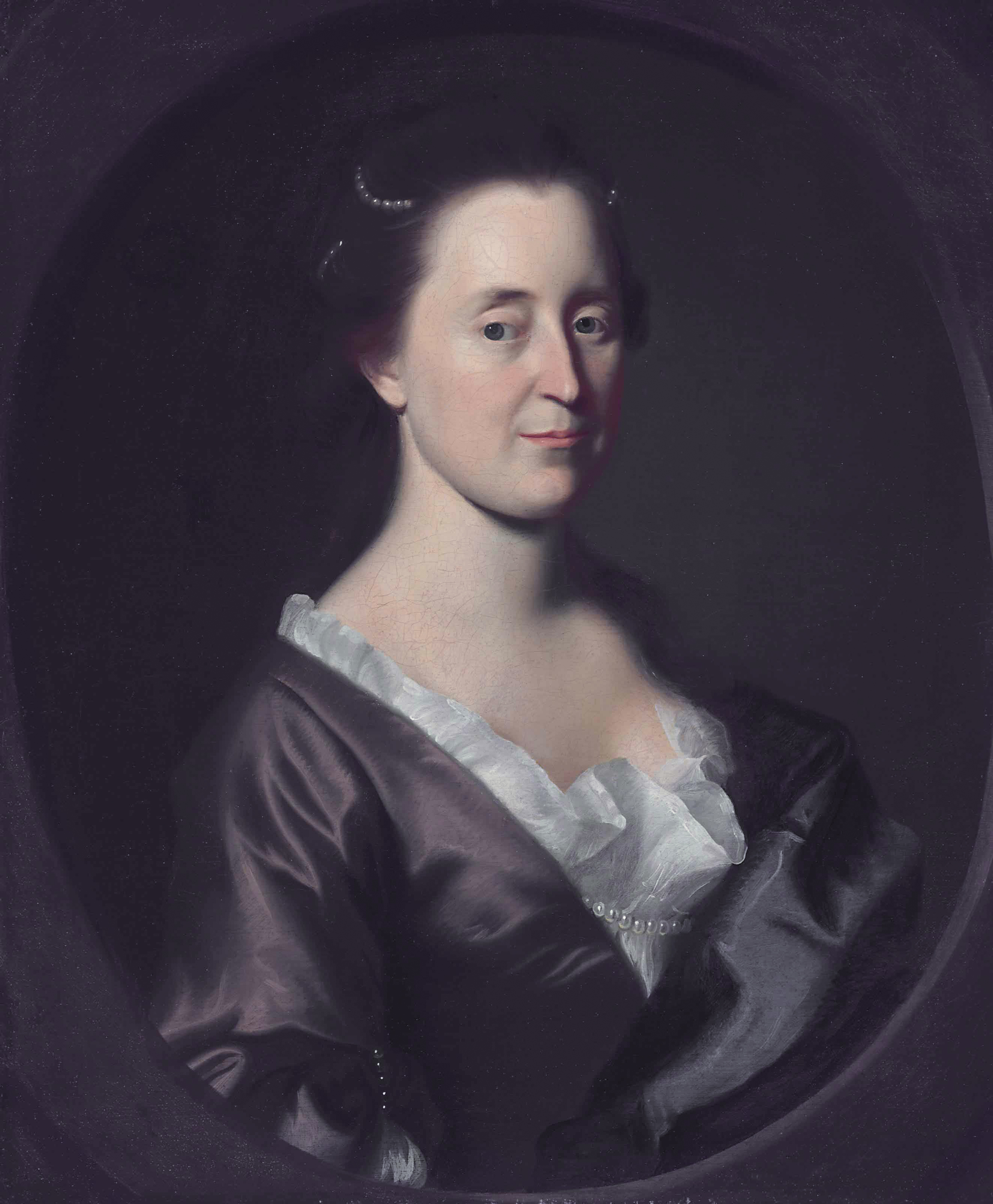
Rebecca Dudley Gerrish (John Singleton Copley, ca 1763–66)

Binney married Rebecca Dudley in 1744 and they moved to Halifax around 1751, shortly after his brother Joseph had moved there. Gerrish set up in business with Joseph Gray, his brother Joseph's son-in-law. With others, he lobbied for representative government in the province. He and his brother were elected to the first assembly, but Benjamin was apparently out of the province and did not serve. He did serve in the second to fourth assemblies. In 1760, he was named justice of the peace for Halifax County, a captain in the militia and Indian commissary. When Jonathan Belcher became lieutenant governor, he removed Gerrish from the commissary contract. When Belcher allowed the province's debtor's act to lapse in 1761, Gerrish helped lead a boycott of the assembly which eventually led to Belcher's removal. In 1768, Gerrish was named to the province's Council, resigning his assembly seat on June 27, 1768. He died in Southampton in England at the age of 54.

Rebecca, his widow, married John Burbidge, another member of the province's assembly. She is buried, under her married name Gerrish, at the King's Chapel Burying Ground in Boston, Massachusetts.
