= John Day (Nova Scotia legislator) =

Canadian politician

John Day (before 1755 – November 1775) was a merchant and political figure in Nova Scotia. He represented Newport Township from 1765 to 1769 and Halifax Township from 1774 to 1775 in the Nova Scotia House of Assembly.

He was the son of Doctor George Day. During the late 1750s, Day was a naval surgeon and merchant. He married Sarah Mercer in 1755. In 1763, he married Henrietta Maria Cottnam after the death of his first wife. He was named a justice of the peace for King's County in 1764. In 1769, he left for Philadelphia where he set up in business as a druggist. He returned to Halifax in 1773, again entering business as a merchant. He resigned his seat in the provincial assembly in April 1775. He was lost at sea later that year while transporting supplies to the garrison at Boston.

His son, who was also named John Day, went on to represent Newport township in the provincial assembly.
