= Isaac Deschamps =

Canadian politician

Isaac Deschamps (c. 1722 – 11 August 1801) was a Canadian judge, and politician.

Born in Switzerland or England, Deschamps came to Nova Scotia in 1749 and is believed to have been a bilingual Huguenot. Isaac and a son under age 16 years were mentioned in a list of settlers living within the Town of Halifax in July 1752; Deschamps was employed by Joshua Mauger, victualer to the navy at Halifax in 1751; by 1754 Deschamps was at Fort Edward (Windsor) as Clerk in Mauger's store; Deschamps acted as interpreter and translator for documents at the time of the expulsion of the Acadian French (1754). Halifax authorities replied to Capt. Alexander Murray, Commanding Fort Edward that his request to have Isaac Deschamps appointed a Notary Public could not be granted since the only person who could approve such a position was the Archbishop of Canterbury; it was felt that Deschamps could "do any little business the French Inhabitants want without any particular appointment". Col. Winslow was the commander of the New England Provincial troops at Grand Pre during the evacuation of the Acadian French; he used the services of Deschamps who at the time was a merchant at Fort Edward, as an interpreter and translator.

He participated in the Bay of Fundy Campaign (1755) at Fort Edward to remove the Acadians. He was elected to the Nova Scotia House of Assembly for 1759 to 1760 for Annapolis County and represented Falmouth Township from 1761 to 1770 and Newport Township from 1770 to 1783. In 1761, he was appointed judge of the Inferior Court of Common Pleas and judge of probate for Kings County. In 1783 he was appointed to the Nova Scotia Council. From 1785 to 1788, he was the Chief Justice of the Nova Scotia Supreme Court. Many of his recordings are held at the Nova Scotia Archives.

== Family ==
The name of Deschamps's first wife is unknown, but she was probably a daughter of William Saul of Liverpool, England. He had one son (George, b. 1746, probably in England). In 1758 he married Sarah Ellis in Halifax. He died 11 August 1801 in Windsor, Nova Scotia.
