= 1871 Nova Scotia general election =

Canadian provincial election

- May 16, 1871

38 seats in the Nova Scotia House of Assembly 20 seats needed for a majority
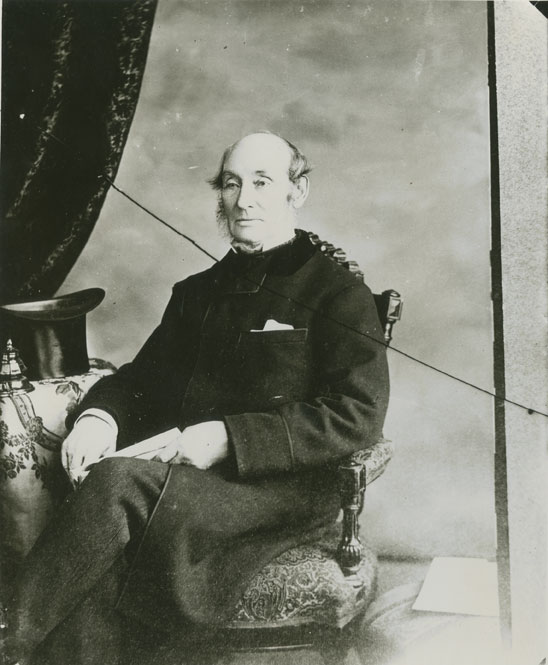

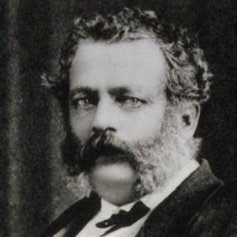
	First party	Second party
Leader	William Annand	Hiram Blanchard
Party	Liberal	Liberal-Conservative
Leader since	1867	1867
Leader's seat	Member of Legislative Council	Ran in Inverness (Won)
Last election	36	2
Seats won	24	14
Seat change	▼12	▲12
Popular vote	39,494	35,471
Percentage	52.68%	47.32%
Swing	▼8.30pp	▲8.30pp
Premier before election
William Annand
Liberal
Premier after election
William Annand
Liberal

The 1871 Nova Scotia general election was held on 16 May 1871 to elect members of the 25th House of Assembly of the province of Nova Scotia, Canada. It was won by the Liberal party.

== Results ==
=== Results by party ===
↓
24	14
Liberal	Liberal-Conservative

Official results
Party	Party leader	# of candidates	Seats				Popular vote		
Party	Party leader	# of candidates	1867	Dissolution	Elected	Change	#	%	Change (pp)
Liberal	William Annand	38	36	36	24	-12	39,494	52.68%	-8.30%
Liberal-Conservative	Hiram Blanchard	33	2	2	14	+12	35,471	47.32%	+8.30%
Vacant				0					
Total valid votes							74,965	100.00%	–
Blank and invalid ballots							0	0.00%	–
Total		71	38	38	38	–	74,965	100.00%	–

Popular vote
Liberal	52.68%
Liberal-Conservative	47.32%

Seats summary
Liberal	63.16%
Liberal-Conservative	36.84%

== Retiring incumbents ==
Liberal

- Henry Balcom, Halifax
- Robert Chambers, Colchester
- James Cochran, Halifax
- Josiah Hooper, Richmond
- Amos Purdy, Cumberland
- Martin Isaac Wilkins, Pictou
- Elkanah Young, Hants

== Nominated candidates ==
1871 Nova Scotia Provincial Election

Legend
bold denotes party leader
† denotes an incumbent who is not running for re-election or was defeated in nomination contest

=== Valley ===
Electoral district	Candidates		Incumbent
Electoral district	Liberal	Liberal-Conservative	Incumbent
Annapolis	Jared C. Troop; 1,083; 26.03%	Avard Longley; 1,017; 24.44%	Jared C. Troop
Annapolis	David C. Landers; 1,076; 25.86%	T. W. Chesley; 985; 23.67%	David C. Landers
Digby	William Berrian Vail; 1,028; 35.83%	Colin Campbell; 721; 25.13%	William Berrian Vail
Digby	Urbine Doucette; 1,019; 35.52%	A. Amirault; 101; 3.52%	Urbine Doucette
Hants	William Dawson Lawrence; 1,183; 22.43%	William Henry Allison; 1,446; 27.42%	William Dawson Lawrence
Hants	Frederick Curry; 1,249; 23.68%	William McDougall; 1,396; 26.47%	Elkanah Young†
Kings	David M. Dickie; 796; 21.68%	Daniel Charles Moore; 1,094; 29.80%	David M. Dickie
Kings	Edward L. Brown; 797; 21.71%	Douglas Benjamin Woodworth; 984; 26.80%	Edward L. Brown

=== South Shore ===
Electoral district	Candidates		Incumbent
Electoral district	Liberal	Liberal-Conservative	Incumbent
Lunenburg	Mather Byles DesBrisay; Acclamation		Mather Byles DesBrisay
Lunenburg	James Daniel Eisenhauer; Acclamation		James Daniel Eisenhauer
Queens	William Henry Smith; 826; 33.59%	Thomas Patillo; 465; 18.91%	William Henry Smith
Queens	Samuel Freeman; 829; 33.71%	Will Hendry; 339; 13.79%	Samuel Freeman
Shelburne	Thomas Johnston; 826; 30.72%	William F. MacCoy; 570; 21.20%	Thomas Johnston
Shelburne	Robert Robertson; 765; 28.45%	J. H. Kendrick; 528; 19.64%	Robert Robertson
Yarmouth	Albert Gayton; 714; 25.71%	John Van Norden Hatfield; 397; 14.30%	John K. Ryerson
Yarmouth	John K. Ryerson; 636; 22.90%	John Van Norden Hatfield; 397; 14.30%	John K. Ryerson
Yarmouth	William H. Townsend; 659; 23.73%	N. Churchill; 371; 13.36%	William H. Townsend

=== Fundy-Northeast ===
Electoral district	Candidates		Incumbent
Electoral district	Liberal	Liberal-Conservative	Incumbent
Colchester	Thomas Fletcher Morrison; Acclamation		Thomas Fletcher Morrison
Colchester		Samuel Rettie; Acclamation	Robert Chambers†
Cumberland	George Hibbard; 1,043; 20.14%	Henry Gesner Pineo Jr. 1,605; 31.00%	Henry Gesner Pineo Jr.
Cumberland	J. K. Kiderkin; 946; 18.27%	Edward Vickery; 1,584; 30.59%	Amos Purdy†

=== Halifax ===
Electoral district	Candidates		Incumbent
Electoral district	Liberal	Liberal-Conservative	Incumbent
Halifax	William Garvie; 2,752; 17.66%	Philip Carteret Hill; 2,497; 16.02%	Philip Carteret Hill
Halifax	John Flinn; 2,704; 17.35%	M. B. Daly; 2,492; 15.99%	James Cochran†
Halifax	Donald Archibald; 2,693; 17.28%	J. Geddes; 2,448; 15.71%	Henry Balcom†

=== Central Nova ===
Electoral district	Candidates		Incumbent
Electoral district	Liberal	Liberal-Conservative	Incumbent
Antigonish	Daniel MacDonald; 1,052; 30.62%	R. N. Henry; 853; 24.83%	Daniel MacDonald
Antigonish	Joseph MacDonald; 978; 28.46%	Angus McGillivray; 553; 16.09%	Joseph MacDonald
Guysborough	John Angus Kirk; 745; 25.86%	Joseph William Hadley; 706; 24.51%	John Angus Kirk
Guysborough	William Henry Wylde; 743; 25.79%	Alexander N. McDonald; 687; 23.85%	William Henry Wylde
Pictou	George Murray; 1,955; 15.68%	James McDonald; 2,270; 18.21%	George Murray
Pictou	John D. McLeod; 1,927; 15.46%	Simon Hugh Holmes; 2,242; 17.98%	Martin Isaac Wilkins†
Pictou	Robert S. Copeland; 1,884; 15.11%	Hugh J. Cameron; 2,188; 17.55%	Robert S. Copeland

=== Cape Breton ===
Electoral district	Candidates		Incumbent
Electoral district	Liberal	Liberal-Conservative	Incumbent
Cape Breton	Alonzo J. White; 1,329; 42.26%	Newton LeGayet Mackay; 824; 26.20%	Alonzo J. White
Cape Breton	John Fergusson; 992; 31.54%		John Fergusson
Inverness	Alexander Campbell; 1,280; 24.15%	**Hiram Blanchard**; 1,427; 26.92%	Alexander Campbell
Inverness	Hugh McDonald; 1,265; 23.87%	Samuel McDonnell; 1,328; 25.06%	Hugh McDonald
Richmond	Edmund Power Flynn; 492; 39.17%		Edmund Power Flynn
Richmond	Isidore LeBlanc; 317; 25.24%	Murdoch McRae; 447; 35.59%	Josiah Hooper†
Victoria	John Ross; 505; 27.79%	David McCurdy; 383; 21.08%	John Ross
Victoria	William Kidston; 406; 22.34%	Charles James Campbell; 523; 28.78%	William Kidston
