= 1867 Nova Scotia general election =

Canadian provincial election

- September 18, 1867

38 seats in the Nova Scotia House of Assembly 20 seats needed for a majority
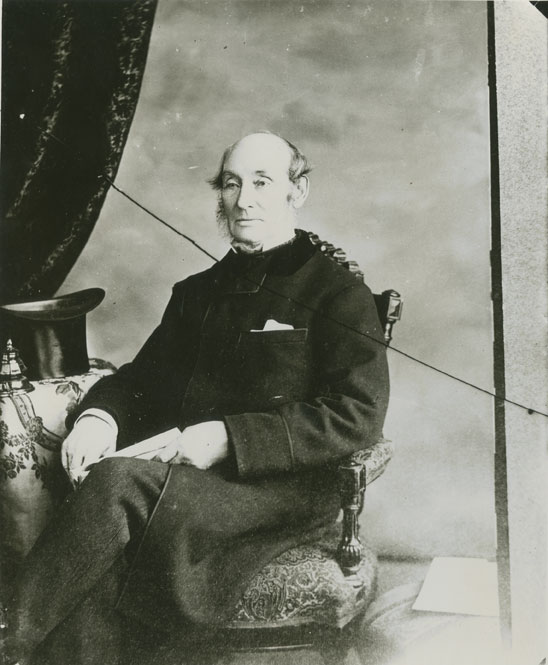

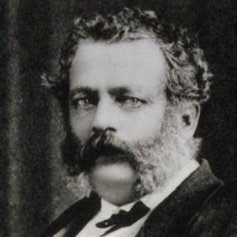
| | First party | Second party |
|---|---|---|
| Leader | William Annand | Hiram Blanchard |
| Party | Anti-Confederation Party | Confederation Party |
| Leader since | 1867 | 1867 |
| Leader's seat | Member of Legislative Council | Ran in Inverness (Won, later declared invalid) |
| Seats won | 36 | 2 |
| Popular vote | 47,448 | 30,362 |
| Percentage | 60.98% | 39.02% |
Premier before election
Hiram Blanchard
Liberal-Conservative
Premier after election
William Annand
Anti-Confederation Party

The 1867 Nova Scotia general election was held on 18 September 1867 to elect members of the 24th House of Assembly of the province of Nova Scotia, Canada. It was the first general election in Nova Scotia after Confederation, and was won by the Anti-Confederation Party.

In 1867 Nova Scotia used a mixture of two- and three-seat districts, in each of which the voter had the right to cast as many votes as seats to fill in the district (block voting).

== Results ==
=== Results by party ===
↓
| 36 | 2 |
| Anti-Confederation | Confederation |

Official results
| Party | Party leader | # of candidates | Seats | | Popular vote |
| Party | Party leader | # of candidates | Elected | # | % |
|---|---|---|---|---|---|
| Anti-Confederation | William Annand | 41 | 36 | 47,448 | 60.98% |
| Confederation | Hiram Blanchard | 36 | 2 | 30,362 | 39.02% |
| Total valid votes | | | | 77,810 | 100.00% |
| Blank and invalid ballots | | | | 0 | 0.00% |
| Total | | 77 | 38 | 77,810 | 100.00% |

Popular vote
| Anti-Confederation | 60.98% |
| Confederation | 39.02% |

Seats summary
| Anti-Confederation | 94.74% |
| Confederation | 5.26% |

== Nominated candidates ==
1867 Nova Scotia Provincial Election

Legend
bold denotes party leader

=== Valley ===
| Electoral district | Candidates | | Incumbent |
| Electoral district | Anti-Confederation | Confederation | Incumbent |
|---|---|---|---|
| Annapolis | Jared C. Troop; 1,187; 27.16% | W. T. Foster; 1,019; 23.31% | New riding |
| Annapolis | David C. Landers; 1,163; 26.61% | George Whitman; 1,002; 22.92% | New riding |
| Digby | William Berrian Vail; 1,139; 36.% | Colin Campbell; 612; 19.34% | New riding |
| Digby | Urbine Doucette; 1,010; 31.92% | J. Melanson; 403; 12.74% | New riding |
| Hants | William Dawson Lawrence; 1,529; 31.64% | Parker; 921; 19.06% | New riding |
| Hants | Elkanah Young; 1,479; 30.60% | William McDougall; 904; 18.70% | New riding |
| Kings | David M. Dickie; 1,393; 32.87% | T.W. Harris; 904; 21.33% | New riding |
| Kings | Edward L. Brown; 1,280; 30.20% | R. C. Foster; 661; 15.60% | New riding |

=== South Shore ===
| Electoral district | Candidates | | Incumbent |
| Electoral district | Anti-Confederation | Confederation | Incumbent |
|---|---|---|---|
| Lunenburg | Mather Byles DesBrisay; 1,553; 31.93% | Henry S. Jost; 853; 17.54% | New riding |
| Lunenburg | James Daniel Eisenhauer; 1,664; 34.22% | W. A. C. Randall; 793; 16.31% | New riding |
| Queens | William Henry Smith; 792; 36.65% | Allison; 310; 14.35% | New riding |
| Queens | Samuel Freeman; 785; 36.33% | A. J. Campbell; 274; 12.68% | New riding |
| Shelburne | Robert Robertson; Acclamation | | New riding |
| Shelburne | Thomas Johnson; Acclamation | | New riding |
| Yarmouth | John K. Ryerson; 1,138; 32.53% | John Van Norden Hatfield; 626; 17.90% | New riding |
| Yarmouth | W. G. Goucher; 726; 20.75% | Isaac Smith Hatfield; 61; 1.74% | New riding |
| Yarmouth | William H. Townsend; 853; 24.39% | J. Smith Hatfield; 94; 2.69% | New riding |

=== Fundy-Northeast ===
| Electoral district | Candidates | | Incumbent |
| Electoral district | Anti-Confederation | Confederation | Incumbent |
|---|---|---|---|
| Colchester | Thomas Fletcher Morrison; 1,641; 28.59% | Samuel Rettie; 1,311; 22.84% | New riding |
| Colchester | Robert Chambers; 1,625; 28.32% | N. McKim; 1,162; 20.25% | New riding |
| Cumberland | Amos Purdy; 1,309; 25.07% | Edward Vickery; 1,284; 24.59% | New riding |
| Cumberland | W. Fullerton; 1,291; 24.73% | Henry Gesner Pineo Jr. 1,337; 25.61% | New riding |

=== Halifax ===
| Electoral district | Candidates | | Incumbent |
| Electoral district | Anti-Confederation | Confederation | Incumbent |
|---|---|---|---|
| Halifax | Jeremiah Northup; 2,386; 17.64% | Philip Carteret Hill; 2,152; 15.91% | New riding |
| Halifax | James Cochran; 2,366; 17.49% | S. Tobin; 2,129; 15.74% | New riding |
| Halifax | Henry Balcom; 2,364; 17.48% | G. McLeod; 2,129; 15.74% | New riding |

=== Central Nova ===
| Electoral district | Candidates | | Incumbent |
| Electoral district | Anti-Confederation | Confederation | Incumbent |
|---|---|---|---|
| Antigonish | Daniel MacDonald; 1,424; 45.95% | R. N. Henry; 410; 13.23% | New riding |
| Antigonish | Joseph MacDonald; 1,072; 34.59% | J. Macdonald; 193; 6.23% | New riding |
| Guysborough | John Joseph Marshall; 730; 32.10% | J. A. Tory; 443; 19.48% | New riding |
| Guysborough | John Angus Kirk; 674; 29.64% | Alexander N. McDonald; 427; 18.78% | New riding |
| Pictou | George Murray; 2,019; 18.45% | Simon Hugh Holmes; 1,684; 15.38% | New riding |
| Pictou | Robert S. Copeland; 1,977; 18.06% | Donald Fraser; 1,649; 15.06% | New riding |
| Pictou | Martin Isaac Wilkins; 1,968; 17.98% | Alexander MacKay; 1,649; 15.06% | New riding |

=== Cape Breton ===
| Electoral district | Candidates | | Incumbent |
| Electoral district | Anti-Confederation | Confederation | Incumbent |
|---|---|---|---|
| Cape Breton | Alonzo J. White; 963; 29.39% | Newton LeGayet Mackay; 616; 18.80% | New riding |
| Cape Breton | S. L. Purvis; 471; 14.37% | Newton LeGayet Mackay; 616; 18.80% | New riding |
| Cape Breton | John Fergusson; 702; 21.42% | P. Cadegan; 525; 16.02% | New riding |
| Inverness | Alexander Campbell; 1,058; 30.51% | | New riding |
| Inverness | H. McInnis; 932; 26.87% | **Hiram Blanchard**; 986; 28.43% | New riding |
| Inverness | A. Gillis; 492; 14.19% | **Hiram Blanchard**; 986; 28.43% | New riding |
| Richmond | Edmund Power Flynn; 583; 39.85% | J. H. Hearn; 362; 24.74% | New riding |
| Richmond | Josiah Hooper; 518; 35.41% | | New riding |
| Victoria | John Ross; 621; 37.21% | Charles James Campbell; 256; 15.34% | New riding |
| Victoria | William Kidston; 571; 34.21% | McLean; 162; 9.71% | New riding |
| Victoria | William Kidston; 571; 34.21% | Haliburton; 59; 3.53% | New riding |
