= 25th General Assembly of Nova Scotia =

The 25th General Assembly of Nova Scotia represented Nova Scotia between 1871 and 1874.

Jared C. Troop was chosen as speaker for the house.

The assembly was dissolved on November 23, 1874.

== List of Members ==
Electoral District	Name	Party	First elected / previously elected
Annapolis County	Jared C. Troop	Liberal	1867
Annapolis County	David C. Landers	Liberal	1867
Antigonish County	Daniel MacDonald	Liberal	1867
Antigonish County	Joseph MacDonald	Liberal	1867
County of Cape Breton	Alonza J. White	Liberal	1867
County of Cape Breton	John Fergusson	Liberal	1867
Colchester County	Thomas Fletcher Morrison	Liberal	1855, 1867
Colchester County	Samuel Rettie	Conservative	1871
Cumberland County	Henry Gesner Pineo, Jr.	Conservative	1867
Cumberland County	Edward Vickery	Conservative	1871
Digby County	William Berrian Vail	Liberal	1867
Digby County	Urbine Doucett	Liberal	1871
Guysborough County	John Angus Kirk (Note: elected to federal seat)	Liberal	1867
Guysborough County	William H. Wylde	Liberal	1870
Guysborough County	Charles M. Franchville (1874)	Liberal	1874
Halifax County	William Garvie (Note: died in 1872)	Liberal	1871
Halifax County	John Flinn	Liberal	1871
Halifax County	Donald Archibald	Liberal	1871
Halifax County	John Taylor (1873)	Liberal	1873
Hants County	William Henry Allison (Note: resigned to run for federal seat)	Conservative	1871
Hants County	William McDougall (Note: resigned)	Liberal	1871
Hants County	Thomas B. Smith (1874)	Liberal	1874
Hants County	Henry Yeomans (1874)	Liberal	1874
Inverness County	Hiram Blanchard	Conservative	1859, 1871
Inverness County	Samuel McDonnell	Conservative	1863, 1871
Inverness County	Duncan J. Campbell (1872)	Conservative	1872
Kings County	Daniel Moore	Conservative	1847, 1861, 1871
Kings County	Douglas B. Woodworth	Conservative	1871
Lunenburg County	Mather Byles DesBrisay	Liberal	1867
Lunenburg County	James Eisenhauer	Liberal	1867
Pictou County	James McDonald	Conservative	1859, 1871
Pictou County	Simon H. Holmes	Conservative	1871
Pictou County	Hugh J. Cameron	Conservative	1871
Pictou County	Alexander MacKay (1872)	Conservative	1863, 1872
Queens County	Samuel Freeman	Liberal	1867
Queens County	William H. Smith	Liberal	1867
Richmond County	Edmund Flynn	Liberal	1867
Richmond County	Charles Boudroit (1874)	Liberal	1874
Richmond County	Murdoch McRae	Conservative	1871
Shelburne County	Thomas Johnston	Liberal	1867
Shelburne County	Robert Robertson	Liberal	1855
Victoria County	Charles J. Campbell (Note: named to Legislative Council)	Conservative	1855, 1863, 1871
Victoria County	John Ross	Liberal	1867
Victoria County	David McCurdy (1873)	Conservative	1873
Yarmouth County	Albert Gayton	Conservative	1871
Yarmouth County	William H. Townsend	Liberal	1859, 1866
Yarmouth County	John K. Ryerson (1872)	Liberal	1867, 1872

== Notes ==
Preceded by 24th General Assembly of Nova Scotia	General Assemblies of Nova Scotia; 1871–1874	Succeeded by 26th General Assembly of Nova Scotia
