= 24th General Assembly of Nova Scotia =

The 24th General Assembly of Nova Scotia represented Nova Scotia between 1867 and 1871.

John J. Marshall was chosen as speaker for the house. Jared C. Troop was named speaker in February 1870 after Marshall's death.

The assembly was dissolved on April 17, 1871.

== List of Members ==
Electoral District	Name	Party	First elected / previously elected
Annapolis County	Jared C. Troop	Anti-Confederation	1867
Annapolis County	David C. Landers	Anti-Confederation	1867
Antigonish County	Daniel MacDonald	Anti-Confederation	1867
Antigonish County	Joseph MacDonald	Anti-Confederation	1867
County of Cape Breton	Alonza J. White	Anti-Confederation	1867
County of Cape Breton	John Fergusson	Anti-Confederation	1867
Colchester County	Thomas Fletcher Morrison	Anti-Confederation	1855, 1867
Colchester County	Robert Chambers	Anti-Confederation	1867
Cumberland County	Henry Gesner Pineo, Jr.	Confederation	1867
Cumberland County	Amos Purdy	Anti-Confederation	1867
Digby County	William Berrian Vail	Anti-Confederation	1867
Digby County	Urbine Doucett	Anti-Confederation	1867
Guysborough County	John Joseph Marshall (Note: died in 1870)	Anti-Confederation	1840, 1848, 1867
Guysborough County	John Angus Kirk	Anti-Confederation	1867
Guysborough County	W.H. Wylde (1870)	Anti-Confederation	1870
Halifax County	Jeremiah Northup (Note: named to Senate of Canada)	Anti-Confederation	1867
Halifax County	James Cochran	Anti-Confederation	1867
Halifax County	Henry Balcom	Anti-Confederation	1863
Halifax County	Philip Carteret Hill (1870)	Confederation	1870
Hants County	William Dawson Lawrence	Anti-Confederation	1863
Hants County	Elkanah Young	Anti-Confederation	1843, 1851, 1867
Inverness County	Alexander Campbell	Anti-Confederation	1867
Inverness County	Hiram Blanchard (Note: election appealed)	Confederation	1859
Inverness County	Hugh McDonald (1868)	Anti-Confederation	1868
Kings County	David M. Dickie	Anti-Confederation	1867
Kings County	Edward L. Brown	Anti-Confederation	1847, 1863
Lunenburg County	Mather Byles DesBrisay	Anti-Confederation	1867
Lunenburg County	James Eisenhauer	Anti-Confederation	1867
Pictou County	George Murray	Anti-Confederation	1867
Pictou County	Robert S. Copeland	Anti-Confederation	1867
Pictou County	Martin I. Wilkins	Anti-Confederation	1851, 1867
Queens County	William H. Smith	Confederation	1867
Queens County	Samuel Freeman	Anti-Confederation	1867
Richmond County	Edward Flynn	Anti-Confederation	1867
Richmond County	Josiah Hooper	Anti-Confederation	1867
Shelburne County	Robert Robertson	Anti-Confederation	1855
Shelburne County	Thomas Johnston	Anti-Confederation	1867
Victoria County	John Ross	Anti-Confederation	1867
Victoria County	William Kidston	Anti-Confederation	1867
Yarmouth County	John K. Ryerson	Anti-Confederation	1867
Yarmouth County	William H. Townsend	Anti-Confederation	1859, 1866

== Notes ==
Preceded by 23rd General Assembly of Nova Scotia	General Assemblies of Nova Scotia; 1867–1871	Succeeded by 25th General Assembly of Nova Scotia
