= 1874 Nova Scotia general election =

Canadian provincial election

← 1871	December 17, 1874	1878 →

38 seats in the Nova Scotia House of Assembly 20 seats needed for a majority
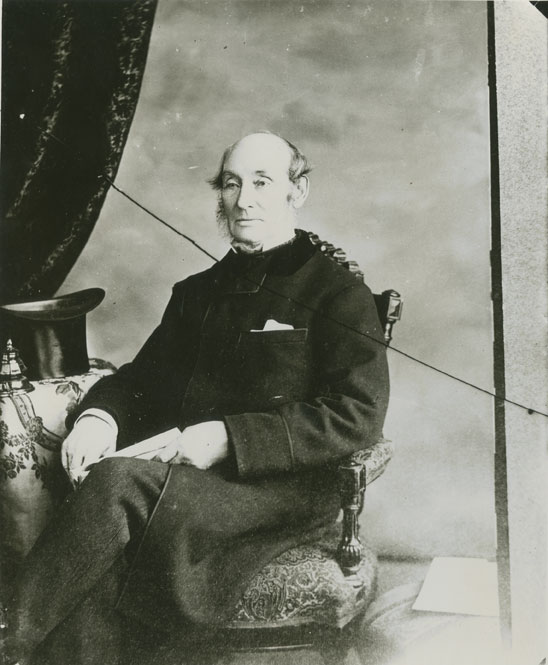

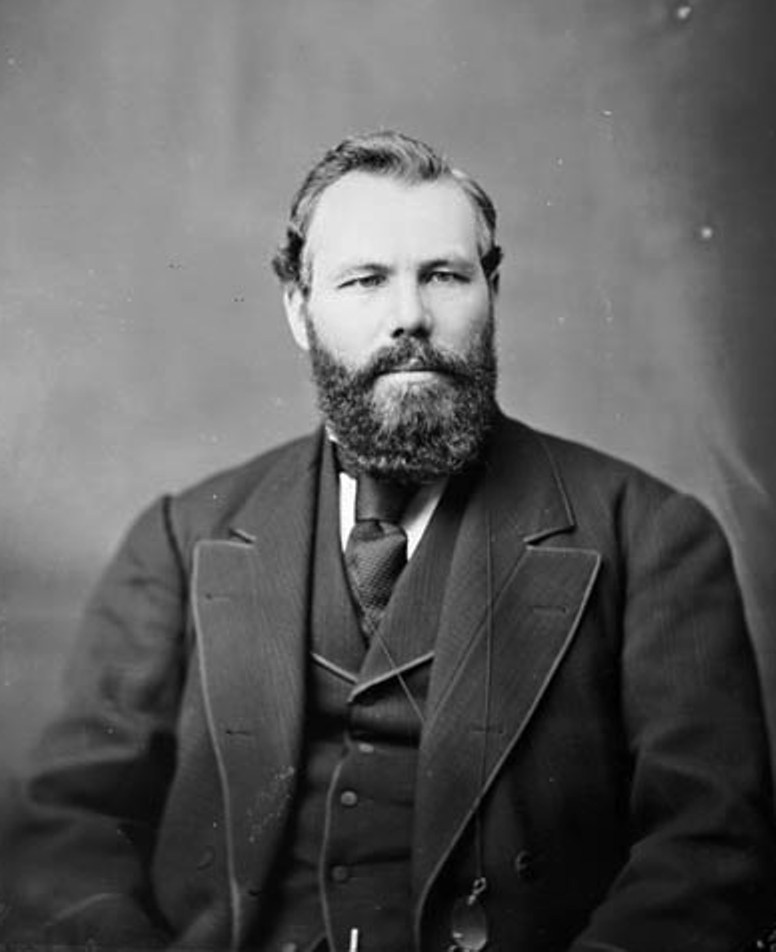
	First party	Second party	Third party
			Ind
Leader	William Annand	Simon Hugh Holmes
Party	Liberal	Liberal-Conservative	Independent/Other
Leader since	1867	1874
Leader's seat	Member of Legislative Council	Pictou
Last election	24	14	0
Seats won	20	11	7
Seat change	▼4	▼3	▲7
Popular vote	36,706	22,722	8,060
Percentage	54.39%	33.67%	11.94%
Swing	▲1.71pp	▼13.65pp	▲11.94pp
Premier before election
William Annand
Liberal
Premier after election
William Annand
Liberal

The 1874 Nova Scotia general election was held on 17 December 1874 to elect members of the 26th House of Assembly of the province of Nova Scotia, Canada. It was won by the Liberal party.

== Results ==
=== Results by party ===
↓
20	11	7
Liberal	Liberal-Conservative	Independent

Official results
Party	Party leader	# of candidates	Seats				Popular vote		
Party	Party leader	# of candidates	1871	Dissolution	Elected	Change	#	%	Change (pp)
Liberal	William Annand	33	24	26	20	-4	36,706	54.39%	+1.71%
Liberal-Conservative	Simon Hugh Holmes	27	14	9	11	-3	22,722	33.67%	-13.65%
Independent/Other		8	0	1	7	+7	8,060	11.94%	+11.94%
Vacant				2					
Total valid votes							67,488	100.00%	–
Blank and invalid ballots							0	0.00%	–
Total		68	38	38	38	–	67,488	100.00%	–

Popular vote
Liberal	54.39%
Liberal-Conservative	33.67%
Independent/Other	11.94%

Seats summary
Liberal	52.63%
Liberal-Conservative	28.95%
Independent/Other	18.42%

== Retiring incumbents ==
Liberal

- John Flinn, Halifax
- David C. Landers, Annapolis
- John Ross, Victoria
- William Henry Smith, Queens
- John Taylor, Halifax
- Jared C. Troop, Annapolis
- William Berrian Vail, Digby
- Henry Yeomans, Hants

Liberal-Conservative

- Hiram Blanchard, Inverness
- Samuel Rettie, Colchester

== Nominated candidates ==
1874 Nova Scotia Provincial Election

Legend
bold denotes party leader
† denotes an incumbent who is not running for re-election or was defeated in nomination contest

=== Valley ===
Electoral district	Candidates			Incumbent
Electoral district	Liberal	Liberal-Conservative	Independent/Other	Incumbent
Annapolis	E. Bent; 1,013; 23.05%	Avard Longley; 1,211; 27.55%		Jared C. Troop†
Annapolis	Parker; 994; 22.62%	William Botsford Troop; 1,177; 26.78%		David C. Landers†
Digby	Henri M. Robicheau; 967; 30.28%	John Chipman Wade; 574; 17.98%		William Berrian Vail†
Digby	Urbine Doucette; 529; 16.57%		Colin Campbell (Anti-Confederate); 1,123; 35.17%	Urbine Doucette
Hants	Thomas Barlow Smith; 1,332; 31.68%	William Henry Allison; 1,463; 34.80%		Thomas Barlow Smith
Hants		Alfred Putnam; 1,409; 33.52%		Henry Yeomans†
Kings	Daniel Charles Moore; 1,027; 22.95%		John B. North; 1,171; 26.17%	Daniel Charles Moore
Kings	Henry Shaw; 1,016; 22.71%	Douglas Benjamin Woodworth; 1,260; 28.16%		Vacant

=== South Shore ===
Electoral district	Candidates			Incumbent
Electoral district	Liberal	Liberal-Conservative	Independent/Other	Incumbent
Lunenburg	James Daniel Eisenhauer; 1,507; 28.95%	William Young; 1,148; 22.06%		James Daniel Eisenhauer
Lunenburg	Mather Byles DesBrisay; 1,423; 27.34%	Edward James; 1,127; 21.65%		Mather Byles DesBrisay
Queens	Isaac N. Mack; 740; 32.46%	Charles Allison; 441; 19.34%		William Henry Smith†
Queens	Samuel Freeman; 705; 30.92%	George Starrat Parker; 394; 17.28%		Samuel Freeman
Shelburne	Thomas Johnston; Acclamation			Thomas Johnston
Shelburne	Robert Robertson; Acclamation			Robert Robertson
Yarmouth	Albert Gayton; 1,641; 45.70%			Albert Gayton
Yarmouth	John Lovitt; 1,211; 33.72%			John K. Ryerson
Yarmouth	John K. Ryerson; 739; 20.58%			John K. Ryerson

=== Fundy-Northeast ===
Electoral district	Candidates			Incumbent
Electoral district	Liberal	Liberal-Conservative	Independent/Other	Incumbent
Colchester	John Barnhill Dickie; 1,687; 30.25%			Samuel Rettie†
Colchester	Thomas Fletcher Morrison; 1,046; 18.76%	William Albert Patterson; 1,718; 30.81%		Thomas Fletcher Morrison
Colchester	Robert Putman; 1,126; 20.19%	William Albert Patterson; 1,718; 30.81%		Thomas Fletcher Morrison
Cumberland		Charles James Townsend; 1,209; 22.92%	Hiram Black; 1,461; 27.70%	Vacant
Cumberland	Amos Purdy; 1,304; 24.72%	Edward Vickery; 1,301; 24.66%		Edward Vickery

=== Halifax ===
Electoral district	Candidates			Incumbent
Electoral district	Liberal	Liberal-Conservative	Independent/Other	Incumbent
Halifax	Philip Carteret Hill; 2,862; 20.88%	Robert Sedgewick; 1,837; 13.40%		John Taylor†
Halifax	Donald Archibald; 2,853; 20.81%	W. J. Almon; 1,818; 13.26%		Donald Archibald
Halifax	Edward Farrell; 2,709; 19.76%	M. J. Griffin; 1,630; 11.89%		John Flinn†

=== Central Nova ===
Electoral district	Candidates			Incumbent
Electoral district	Liberal	Liberal-Conservative	Independent/Other	Incumbent
Antigonish	Daniel MacDonald; 752; 31.01%			Daniel MacDonald
Antigonish	Joseph MacDonald; 661; 27.26%	John J. McKinnon; 1,012; 41.73%		Joseph MacDonald
Guysborough	Charles M. Franchville; 682; 28.26%	Stewart Campbell; 440; 18.23%		Charles M. Franchville
Guysborough	William Henry Wylde; 628; 26.03%	Alexander N. McDonald; 362; 15.00%		William Henry Wylde
Guysborough	William Henry Wylde; 628; 26.03%	Joseph William Hadley; 301; 12.47%		William Henry Wylde
Pictou		Alexander MacKay; Acclamation		Alexander MacKay
Pictou		**Simon Hugh Holmes**; Acclamation		Simon Hugh Holmes
Pictou		Hugh J. Cameron; Acclamation		Hugh J. Cameron

=== Cape Breton ===
Electoral district	Candidates			Incumbent
Electoral district	Liberal	Liberal-Conservative	Independent/Other	Incumbent
Cape Breton	Alonzo J. White; 1,129; 34.19%	John Currie; 204; 6.19%		Alonzo J. White
Cape Breton	John Fergusson; 626; 18.96%	A. G. Hamilton; 304; 9.21%	Ebenezer Tilton Moseley; 1,039; 31.47%	John Fergusson
Inverness	Alexander Campbell; 1,309; 24.06%		John J. McKinnon; 1,390; 25.55%	Hiram Blanchard†
Inverness	Hugh McDonald; 1,260; 23.16%		Duncan J. Campbell; 1,482; 27.24%	Duncan J. Campbell
Richmond			Charles Boudroit; Acclamation	Charles Boudroit
Richmond		Murdoch McRae; Acclamation		Murdoch McRae
Victoria	David McCurdy; 680; 33.93%	John Angus Morrison; 382; 19.06%		David McCurdy
Victoria	John A. Fraser; 548; 27.35%		William Kidston; 394; 19.66%	John Ross†
