= Hants (provincial electoral district) =

Former provincial electoral district in Nova Scotia, Canada

Nova Scotia electoral district

Defunct provincial electoral district
- Legislature: Nova Scotia House of Assembly
- District created: 1867
- District abolished: 1949
- Last contested: 1945

Hants was a provincial electoral district in Nova Scotia, Canada, that, at the time of its dissolution, elected one member to the Nova Scotia House of Assembly. It existed from 1867 until 1949, at which point the district was divided into the current electoral districts of Hants East and Hants West.

== Members of the Legislative Assembly ==
Hants elected the following members to the Nova Scotia House of Assembly:

Legislature	Years	Member	Party
43rd	1945–1949	Robert A. MacLellan	Liberal
42nd	1941–1945	Alexander Stirling MacMillan	Liberal
41st	1937–1941	Alexander Stirling MacMillan	Liberal
40th	1933–1937	Alexander Stirling MacMillan	Liberal

From 1933 to 1949, Hants elected one member to the Legislative Assembly. Prior to 1933, the district elected two members.

Legislature	Years	Member	Party	Member	Party
39th	1930–1933	seat declared vacant		Albert E. Parsons	Liberal-Conservative
39th	1928–1930	Edgar Nelson Rhodes	Liberal-Conservative	Albert E. Parsons	Liberal-Conservative
38th	1925–1928	Edgar Nelson Rhodes	Liberal-Conservative	Albert E. Parsons	Liberal-Conservative
37th	1920–1925	James William Reid	Liberal	John Alexander MacDonald	Farmer's Party
36th	1916–1920	James William Reid	Liberal	Albert E. Parsons	Liberal-Conservative
35th	1911–1916	James William Reid	Liberal	Albert E. Parsons	Liberal-Conservative
34th	1909–1911	James O'Brien	Liberal	Albert E. Parsons	Liberal-Conservative
34th	1907–1909	James O'Brien	Liberal	Charles Smith Wilcox	Liberal-Conservative
34th	1906–1907	Arthur Drysdale	Liberal	Charles Smith Wilcox	Liberal-Conservative
33rd	1901–1906	Arthur Drysdale	Liberal	Francis Parker McHeffey	Liberal
32nd	1897–1901	Arthur Drysdale	Liberal	Charles Smith Wilcox	Liberal-Conservative
31st	1894–1897	Arthur Drysdale	Liberal	Charles Smith Wilcox	Liberal-Conservative
30th	1891–1894	Arthur Drysdale	Liberal	Thomas Barlow Smith	Liberal-Conservative
30th	1890–1891	Allen Haley	Liberal	Thomas Barlow Smith	Liberal-Conservative
29th	1886–1890	Allen Haley	Liberal	Archibald Frame	Liberal
28th	1882–1886	Allen Haley	Liberal	Nathaniel David Spence	Liberal-Conservative
27th	1878–1882	Thomas Barlow Smith	Liberal	Nathaniel David Spence	Liberal-Conservative
26th	1874–1878	William Henry Allison	Liberal-Conservative	Alfred Putnam	Liberal-Conservative
25th	1874^{†}	Thomas Barlow Smith	Liberal	Henry Yeomans	Liberal
25th	1871–1874	William Henry Allison	Liberal-Conservative	William McDougall	Liberal-Conservative
24th	1867–1871	William Dawson Lawrence	Anti-Confederation	Elkanah Young	Anti-Confederation

^{†}There were two by-elections held in 1874, shortly followed by a general election. The by-elections of March 10th, 1874 saw Allison and McDougall replaced by Smith and Yeomans. The general election held on December 17th, 1874 saw the re-election of Allison and the election of Alfred Putnam.

== Election results ==
=== 1933–1949: one member ===
1945 Nova Scotia general election
Party	Candidate	Votes	%	±%
Liberal	Robert A. MacLellan	4,951	52.66%	-4.89%
Progressive Conservative	Norman Dudley Murray	3,194	33.98%	-8.47%
Co-operative Commonwealth	Frederick C. G. Scott	1,256	13.36%	–
Total		9,401	–	
Source(s) Source: Nova Scotia Legislature (2024). "Electoral History for Hants County" (PDF). nslegislature.ca. Nova Scotia Legislature (1945). Returns of the General Election for the House of Assembly (PDF) (Report). Queen's Printer. Archived from the original (PDF) on 10 September 2018.

1941 Nova Scotia general election
Party	Candidate	Votes	%	±%
Liberal	Alexander Stirling MacMillan	4,871	57.56%	2.60%
Progressive Conservative	Norman Dexter Blanchard	3,592	42.44%	-2.60%
Total		8,463	–	
Source(s) Source: Nova Scotia Legislature (2024). "Electoral History for Hants County" (PDF). nslegislature.ca. Nova Scotia Legislature (1941). Returns of the General Election for the House of Assembly (PDF) (Report). Queen's Printer. Archived from the original (PDF) on 8 February 2024.

1937 Nova Scotia general election
Party	Candidate	Votes	%	±%
Liberal	Alexander Stirling MacMillan	5,590	54.96%	1.31%
Progressive Conservative	Leonard William Fraser	4,581	45.04%	-1.31%
Total		10,171	–	
Source(s) Source: Nova Scotia Legislature (2024). "Electoral History for Hants County" (PDF). nslegislature.ca. Nova Scotia Legislature (1937). Returns of the General Election for the House of Assembly (PDF) (Report). Queen's Printer. Archived from the original (PDF) on 1 March 2019.

1933 Nova Scotia general election
Party	Candidate	Votes	%	Elected
Liberal	Alexander Stirling MacMillan	5,328	53.65%	
Liberal-Conservative	Albert Parsons	4,603	46.35%	
Total		9,931	–	
Source(s) Source: Nova Scotia Legislature (2024). "Electoral History for Hants County" (PDF). nslegislature.ca. Nova Scotia Legislature (1933). Returns of the General Election for the House of Assembly (PDF) (Report). Queen's Printer. Archived from the original (PDF) on 1 March 2019.

=== 1867–1933: two members ===
1928 Nova Scotia general election
Party	Candidate	Votes	%	Elected
Liberal-Conservative	Albert Parsons	4,087	26.46%	✓
Liberal-Conservative	Edgar Nelson Rhodes	4,008	25.95%	✓
Liberal	James William Reid	3,823	24.75%	
Liberal	Robert Gass	3,528	22.84%	
Total		15,446	–	
Source(s) Source: Nova Scotia Legislature (2024). "Electoral History for Hants County" (PDF). nslegislature.ca.

Nova Scotia provincial by-election, 1925-08-01
Party	Candidate	Votes	%	Elected
Liberal-Conservative	Edgar Nelson Rhodes	acclaimed	N/A	✓
Total			–	
Source(s) Source: Nova Scotia Legislature (2024). "Electoral History for Hants County" (PDF). nslegislature.ca.

1925 Nova Scotia general election
Party	Candidate	Votes	%	Elected
Liberal-Conservative	Albert Parsons	4,806	31.38%	✓
Liberal-Conservative	Edgar Nelson Rhodes	4,573	29.86%	✓
Liberal	James William Reid	3,075	20.08%	
Liberal	Lionel A. Forsyth	2,860	18.68%	
Total		15,314	–	
Source(s) Source: Nova Scotia Legislature (2024). "Electoral History for Hants County" (PDF). nslegislature.ca.

1920 Nova Scotia general election
Party	Candidate	Votes	%	Elected
Liberal	James William Reid	3,035	30.69%	✓
United Farmers	John Alexander MacDonald	2,179	22.03%	✓
Liberal-Conservative	Albert Parsons	2,083	21.06%	
United Farmers	Walter J. Aylword	1,594	16.12%	
Labour	Wiley V. Davison	998	10.09%	
Total		9,889	–	
Source(s) Source: Nova Scotia Legislature (2024). "Electoral History for Hants County" (PDF). nslegislature.ca.

1916 Nova Scotia general election
Party	Candidate	Votes	%	Elected
Liberal-Conservative	Albert Parsons	2,142	26.24%	✓
Liberal	James William Reid	2,051	25.13%	✓
Liberal-Conservative	Herbert W. Sangster	2,041	25.00%	
Liberal	Burchell B. Fulmer	1,929	23.63%	
Total		8,163	–	
Source(s) Source: Nova Scotia Legislature (2024). "Electoral History for Hants County" (PDF). nslegislature.ca.

1911 Nova Scotia general election
Party	Candidate	Votes	%	Elected
Liberal-Conservative	Albert Parsons	2,303	28.14%	✓
Liberal	James William Reid	2,066	25.24%	✓
Liberal-Conservative	P. M. Fielding	2,006	24.51%	
Liberal	George Wilson	1,809	22.10%	
Total		8,184	–	
Source(s) Source: Nova Scotia Legislature (2024). "Electoral History for Hants County" (PDF). nslegislature.ca.

Nova Scotia provincial by-election, 1909-11-24
Party	Candidate	Votes	%	Elected
Liberal-Conservative	Albert Parsons	1,921	51.10%	✓
Liberal	Medford Christie	1,838	48.90%	
Total		3,759	–	
Source(s) Source: Nova Scotia Legislature (2024). "Electoral History for Hants County" (PDF). nslegislature.ca.

Nova Scotia provincial by-election, 1907-07-17
Party	Candidate	Votes	%	Elected
Liberal	James O'Brien	2,030	51.88%	✓
Liberal-Conservative	Everett A. O'Brien	1,883	48.12%	
Total		3,913	–	
Source(s) Source: Nova Scotia Legislature (2024). "Electoral History for Hants County" (PDF). nslegislature.ca.

1906 Nova Scotia general election
Party	Candidate	Votes	%	Elected
Liberal	Arthur Drysdale	1,934	26.19%	✓
Liberal-Conservative	Charles Smith Wilcox	1,859	25.17%	✓
Liberal-Conservative	E. A. O'Brien	1,800	24.37%	
Liberal	Francis Parker McHeffey	1,792	24.27%	
Total		7,385	–	
Source(s) Source: Nova Scotia Legislature (2024). "Electoral History for Hants County" (PDF). nslegislature.ca.

1901 Nova Scotia general election
Party	Candidate	Votes	%	Elected
Liberal	Arthur Drysdale	2,092	29.54%	✓
Liberal	Francis Parker McHeffey	1,914	27.02%	✓
Liberal-Conservative	Charles Smith Wilcox	1,619	22.86%	
Liberal-Conservative	A. S. Sanford	1,458	20.58%	
Total		7,083	–	
Source(s) Source: Nova Scotia Legislature (2024). "Electoral History for Hants County" (PDF). nslegislature.ca.

1897 Nova Scotia general election
Party	Candidate	Votes	%	Elected
Liberal	Arthur Drysdale	1,839	26.24%	✓
Liberal-Conservative	Charles Smith Wilcox	1,746	24.91%	✓
Liberal-Conservative	James A. Thompson	1,717	24.50%	
Liberal	William McD Douglas	1,707	24.35%	
Total		7,009	–	
Source(s) Source: Nova Scotia Legislature (2024). "Electoral History for Hants County" (PDF). nslegislature.ca.

1894 Nova Scotia general election
Party	Candidate	Votes	%	Elected
Liberal-Conservative	Charles Smith Wilcox	1,733	25.59%	✓
Liberal	Arthur Drysdale	1,706	25.19%	✓
Liberal-Conservative	Evan Thompson	1,689	24.94%	
Liberal	W. H. Guild	1,644	24.28%	
Total		6,772	–	
Source(s) Source: Nova Scotia Legislature (2024). "Electoral History for Hants County" (PDF). nslegislature.ca.

Nova Scotia provincial by-election, 1891-03-05
Party	Candidate	Votes	%	Elected
Liberal	Arthur Drysdale	1,862	50.16%	✓
Liberal-Conservative	Adam McDougall	1,850	49.84%	
Total		3,712	–	
Source(s) Source: Nova Scotia Legislature (2024). "Electoral History for Hants County" (PDF). nslegislature.ca.

1890 Nova Scotia general election
Party	Candidate	Votes	%	Elected
Liberal-Conservative	Thomas Barlow Smith	1,698	25.84%	✓
Liberal	Allen Haley	1,661	25.28%	✓
Liberal-Conservative	Adam McDougall	1,660	25.26%	
Liberal	Archibald Frame	1,552	23.62%	
Total		6,571	–	
Source(s) Source: Nova Scotia Legislature (2024). "Electoral History for Hants County" (PDF). nslegislature.ca.

1886 Nova Scotia general election
Party	Candidate	Votes	%	Elected
Liberal	Allen Haley	1,552	25.50%	✓
Liberal	Archibald Frame	1,522	25.00%	✓
Liberal-Conservative	Allan McDougall	1,508	24.77%	
Liberal-Conservative	Nathaniel Spence	1,505	24.72%	
Total		6,087	–	
Source(s) Source: Nova Scotia Legislature (2024). "Electoral History for Hants County" (PDF). nslegislature.ca.

1882 Nova Scotia general election
Party	Candidate	Votes	%	Elected
Liberal	Allen Haley	1,261	25.55%	✓
Liberal-Conservative	Nathaniel Spence	1,236	25.05%	✓
Liberal-Conservative	F. S. Creelman	1,229	24.90%	
Liberal	Archibald Frame	1,209	24.50%	
Total		4,935	–	
Source(s) Source: Nova Scotia Legislature (2024). "Electoral History for Hants County" (PDF). nslegislature.ca.

1878 Nova Scotia general election
Party	Candidate	Votes	%	Elected
Liberal-Conservative	Nathaniel Spence	1,621	27.52%	✓
Liberal	Thomas Barlow Smith	1,507	25.58%	✓
Liberal-Conservative	F. S. Creelman	1,465	24.87%	
Liberal	William Dawson Lawrence	1,298	22.03%	
Total		5,891	–	
Source(s) Source: Nova Scotia Legislature (2024). "Electoral History for Hants County" (PDF). nslegislature.ca.

1874 Nova Scotia general election
Party	Candidate	Votes	%	Elected
Liberal-Conservative	William Henry Allison	1,463	34.80%	✓
Liberal-Conservative	Alfred Putnam	1,409	33.52%	✓
Liberal	Thomas Barlow Smith	1,332	31.68%	
Total		4,204	–	
Source(s) Source: Nova Scotia Legislature (2024). "Electoral History for Hants County" (PDF). nslegislature.ca.

Nova Scotia provincial by-election, 1874-03-10
Party	Candidate	Votes	%	Elected
Liberal	Henry Yeomans	acclaimed	N/A	✓
Total			–	
Source(s) Source: Nova Scotia Legislature (2024). "Electoral History for Hants County" (PDF). nslegislature.ca.: Two by-elections held. The first on March 4, 1874 elected Thomas Barlow Smith, defeating Nathaniel Spence.The second by-election saw Henry Yeomans acclaimed on nomination day March 12, 1874.

Nova Scotia provincial by-election, 1874-03-10
Party	Candidate	Votes	%	Elected
Liberal	Thomas Barlow Smith	1,455	52.58%	✓
Liberal-Conservative	Nathaniel Spence	1,312	47.42%	
Total		2,767	–	
Source(s) Source: Nova Scotia Legislature (2024). "Electoral History for Hants County" (PDF). nslegislature.ca.: Two by-elections held. The first on March 4, 1874 elected Thomas Barlow Smith, defeating Nathaniel Spence.The second by-election saw Henry Yeomans acclaimed on nomination day March 12, 1874.

1871 Nova Scotia general election
Party	Candidate	Votes	%	Elected
Liberal-Conservative	William Henry Allison	1,446	27.42%	✓
Liberal-Conservative	William McDougall	1,396	26.47%	✓
Liberal	Frederick Curry	1,249	23.68%	
Liberal	William Dawson Lawrence	1,183	22.43%	
Total		5,274	–	
Source(s) Source: Nova Scotia Legislature (2024). "Electoral History for Hants County" (PDF). nslegislature.ca.

1867 Nova Scotia general election
Party	Candidate	Votes	%	Elected
Anti-Confederation	William Dawson Lawrence	1,529	31.64%	✓
Anti-Confederation	Elkanah Young	1,479	30.60%	✓
Confederation	Parker	921	19.06%	
Confederation	William McDougall	904	18.70%	
Total		4,833	–	
Source(s) Source: Nova Scotia Legislature (2024). "Electoral History for Hants County" (PDF). nslegislature.ca.

== See also ==
- List of Nova Scotia provincial electoral districts
- Canadian provincial electoral districts
