= John Flinn =

John Flinn may refer to:

- John Flinn (baseball) (born 1954), American baseball player
- John Flinn (politician) (died c. 1900), Canadian politician and prison warden

== See also ==
- John Flynn (disambiguation)
