= John Flynn =

John or Johnny Flynn may refer to:

== Arts and entertainment ==
- John Flynn (director) (1932–2007), American film director
- Johnny Flynn (born 1983), British actor and musician
- John Flynn (Marvel Cinematic Universe), fictional character

== Law and politics ==
- John Flynn Jr. (born 1820), American politician in Wisconsin
- John E. Flynn (1912–2003), American politician from New York
- John Gerrard Flynn (born 1937), British ambassador to Venezuela, the Dominican Republic and Haiti, and Angola
- John Flynn (Australian politician) (1953–2024), Australian politician
- John Flynn (New Brunswick politician) (born 1954)
- John Flynn (Irish politician) (died 1968), Fianna Fáil politician from Kerry
- John J. Flynn, former district attorney of Erie County, New York, chairman of the National District Attorneys Association

== Sports ==
- John Flynn (baseball) (1883–1935), American baseball player
- John Flynn (rugby league) (1884–1918), English rugby league footballer
- John Flynn (cricketer) (1890–1952), Australian cricketer
- John Flynn (footballer, born 1948), English footballer
- John Flynn (Gaelic footballer) (born 1984), Irish Gaelic footballer

== Others ==
- John Flynn (minister) (1880–1951), Australian presbyterian minister and medical missionary
- John T. Flynn (1882–1964), American journalist
- John P. Flynn (1922–1997), United States Air Force general
- John J. Flynn, American labor union leader
- John Joseph Flynn (born 1955), American paleontologist

== See also ==
- John Flinn (baseball) (born 1954), American baseball player
- John Flinn (politician) (died c. 1900), Canadian politician and prison warden
- Jonny Flynn (born 1989), American basketball player
- John Flynt (1914–2007), American politician; U.S. Representative from Georgia
