= 24th Nova Scotia general election =

The 24th Nova Scotia general election may refer to

- the 1867 Nova Scotia general election, the 23rd overall general election for Nova Scotia, for the (due to a counting error in 1859) 24th General Assembly of Nova Scotia,
- the 1871 Nova Scotia general election, the 24th overall general election for Nova Scotia, for the 25th General Assembly of Nova Scotia, but considered the 2nd general election for the Canadian province of Nova Scotia, or
- the 1960 Nova Scotia general election, the 46th overall general election for Nova Scotia, for the 47th Legislative Assembly of Nova Scotia, but considered the 24th general election for the Canadian province of Nova Scotia.
