= 25th Nova Scotia general election =

The 25th Nova Scotia general election may refer to

- the 1871 Nova Scotia general election, the 24th overall general election for Nova Scotia, for the (due to a counting error in 1859) 25th General Assembly of Nova Scotia,
- the 1874 Nova Scotia general election, the 25th overall general election for Nova Scotia, for the 26th General Assembly of Nova Scotia, but considered the 3rd general election for the Canadian province of Nova Scotia, or
- the 1963 Nova Scotia general election, the 47th overall general election for Nova Scotia, for the 48th Legislative Assembly of Nova Scotia, but considered the 25th general election for the Canadian province of Nova Scotia.
