= John Alexander Macdonald (disambiguation) =

John A. Macdonald was Canada's first prime minister

John Alexander Macdonald may also refer to:

- John Alexander MacDonald (Prince Edward Island politician) (1838–1905), speaker of the Prince Edward Island assembly
- John Alexander Macdonald (Prince Edward Island politician) (1874–1948), Canadian member of parliament for King's, Prince Edward Island
- John Alexander Macdonald (Nova Scotia politician) (1883–1945), Conservative member for Richmond-West Cape Breton, Nova Scotia
- John Alexander MacDonald (Nova Scotia politician) (unknown–1938), Farmers member for Hants, Nova Scotia
- John A. MacDonald (Nova Scotia politician) (1979–Present), Progressive Conservative provincial member
- Jack MacDonald (Hamilton politician) (1927–2010), businessman, journalist, and mayor of Hamilton, Ontario
- John Alexander McDonald (politician) (1889–1962), Liberal senator from Nova Scotia

== See also ==
- John Macdonald (disambiguation)
