= Albert Parsons (politician) =

Canadian politician (1869–1948)

Albert E. Parsons

MLA for Hants County
- In office 1909–1937

Speaker of the Nova Scotia House of Assembly
- In office 1926–1928
- Preceded by: Robert Irwin
- Succeeded by: Daniel George McKenzie

Personal details
- Born: September 5, 1869 Walton, Nova Scotia
- Died: June 7, 1948 (aged 78) Windsor, Nova Scotia
- Party: Liberal-Conservative
- Occupation: merchant

Albert E. Parsons (September 5, 1869 – June 7, 1948) was a merchant and political figure in Nova Scotia, Canada. He represented Hants County in the Nova Scotia House of Assembly from 1909 to 1937 as a Liberal-Conservative member.

He was born in Walton, Hants County, Nova Scotia, the son of John Parsons and Martha Ward. He worked in the plaster quarries there, later taking over the operation. Parsons was also involved in the lumber trade and shipbuilding. In 1892, he married Ruby L. Smith. Parsons was first elected to the provincial assembly in a 1909 by-election held after the death of Charles Smith Wilcox, the sitting member. He ran unsuccessfully for a seat in the House of Commons in 1921. Parsons served as speaker for the provincial assembly from 1926 to 1928. He was a member of the province's Executive Council from 1930 to 1933. He died in Windsor, Nova Scotia at the age of 78.

His son Ralph Shaw Parsons served overseas during World War I and married Valentyne Churchill, a granddaughter of Ezra Churchill.
