= Charles Harrington (Canadian politician) =

Canadian politician

Charles Fortnum Harrington (June 11, 1804 – October 23, 1864) was a lawyer, judge and political figure in Nova Scotia. He represented Richmond County in the Nova Scotia House of Assembly from 1847 to 1851 and from 1859 to 1863 as a Conservative.

He was born in Halifax, the son of Daniel Harrington and Anna Eliza DeWolf. In 1841, Harrington married Mary Lee Tremain. In 1846, he was named probate judge for Richmond County. Harrington died at Plaister Cove in Inverness County at the age of 60.

With Stewart Campbell and Hiram Blanchard, Harrington was a member of a commission charged with revising and consolidating the statutes for the province of Nova Scotia.
