= James O'Brien (Nova Scotia politician) =

Canadian politician from Nova Scotia (1859–1932)

Member of the Nova Scotia House of Assembly for Hants County
- In office July 17, 1907 – June 13, 1911

Personal details
- Born: February 18, 1859 Windsor, Nova Scotia
- Died: August 21, 1932 (aged 73) Windsor, Nova Scotia
- Party: Liberal
- Spouse: Janet H. McHeffey
- Occupation: merchant, politician

James O'Brien (February 18, 1859 – August 21, 1932) was a merchant and political figure in Nova Scotia, Canada. He represented Hants County in the Nova Scotia House of Assembly from 1907 to 1911 as a Liberal member.

O'Brien was born in 1859 at Windsor, Nova Scotia to William O'Brien and Louisa Leonard. He married Janet H. McHeffey, of Windsor Forks. He served as clerk of the Municipality of West Hants from 1883 to 1896 and as high sheriff from 1896 to 1907. O'Brien died in 1932 at Windsor, Nova Scotia. O'Brien was elected in a by-election on July 18, 1907 to fill the vacancy caused by the resignation of Arthur Drysdale, and he did not contest the subsequent 1911 Nova Scotia general election.
