= Guysborough (federal electoral district) =

Former federal electoral district in Nova Scotia, Canada

Nova Scotia electoral district

Defunct federal electoral district
- Legislature: House of Commons
- District created: 1867
- District abolished: 1914
- First contested: 1867
- Last contested: 1911

Demographics
- Census division(s): Guysborough

Guysborough was an electoral district in Nova Scotia, Canada, that was represented in the House of Commons of Canada from 1867 to 1917.

It was created in the British North America Act, 1867, and was abolished in 1914 when it was merged into Antigonish—Guysborough. It consisted of Guysborough County.

== Members of Parliament ==
This riding elected the following members of Parliament:

Parliament	Years	Member	Party
Guysborough
1st	1867–1868	Stewart Campbell	Anti-Confederation
1st	1868–1872	Stewart Campbell	Liberal–Conservative
2nd	1872–1874	Stewart Campbell	Liberal–Conservative
3rd	1874–1878	John Angus Kirk	Liberal
4th	1878–1882	Alfred Ogden	Conservative
5th	1882–1887	John Angus Kirk	Liberal
6th	1887–1891	John Angus Kirk	Liberal
7th	1891–1896	Duncan Cameron Fraser	Liberal
8th	1896–1900	Duncan Cameron Fraser	Liberal
9th	1900–1904	Duncan Cameron Fraser	Liberal
9th	1904–1904	John Howard Sinclair	Liberal
10th	1904–1908	John Howard Sinclair	Liberal
11th	1908–1911	John Howard Sinclair	Liberal
12th	1911–1917	John Howard Sinclair	Liberal
Riding dissolved into Antigonish—Guysborough

== Election results ==
1867 Canadian federal election
Party	Candidate	Votes
Anti-Confederation	Stewart Campbell	acclaimed
Source: Canadian Elections Database

1872 Canadian federal election
Party	Candidate	Votes
Liberal–Conservative	Stewart Campbell	acclaimed
Source: Canadian Elections Database

1874 Canadian federal election
Party	Candidate	Votes
Liberal	John Angus Kirk	759
Liberal–Conservative	Stewart Campbell	544
lop.parl.ca

1878 Canadian federal election
Party	Candidate	Votes
Conservative	Alfred Ogden	936
Liberal	John Angus Kirk	772

1882 Canadian federal election
Party	Candidate	Votes
Liberal	John Angus Kirk	818
Conservative	Alfred Ogden	628

1887 Canadian federal election
Party	Candidate	Votes
Liberal	John Angus Kirk	1,136
Conservative	Alex. F. Falconer	784

1891 Canadian federal election
Party	Candidate	Votes
Liberal	D.C. Fraser	1,145
Conservative	Alfred Ogden	1,059

1896 Canadian federal election
Party	Candidate	Votes
Liberal	Duncan C. Fraser	1,533
Conservative	C. Ernest Gregory	1,455

1900 Canadian federal election
Party	Candidate	Votes
Liberal	Duncan C. Fraser	1,928
Conservative	C. Ernest Gregory	1,589

By-election: On Mr. Fraser's nomination as Judge of the Supreme Court of Nova Scotia, 10 February 1904

1904 Canadian federal election
Party	Candidate	Votes
Liberal	John Howard Sinclair	2,040
Conservative	John S. Wells	1,492

By-election on 16 March 1904
Party	Candidate	Votes
Liberal	John Howard Sinclair	2,004
Conservative	S.O. Griffin	1,643

1908 Canadian federal election
Party	Candidate	Votes
Liberal	John Howard Sinclair	2,001
Conservative	George Anderson Rowe Rowlings	1,796

1911 Canadian federal election
Party	Candidate	Votes
Liberal	John Howard Sinclair	2,043
Conservative	George Anderson Rowe Rowlings	1,700

== See also ==
- List of Canadian electoral districts
- Historical federal electoral districts of Canada
