= Alfred Ogden =

Canadian politician (1843–1919)

Alfred Ogden (December 31, 1843 – July 29, 1919) was a political figure in Nova Scotia, Canada. He represented Guysborough in the House of Commons of Canada from 1878 to 1882 as a Liberal-Conservative member.

He was born in Port Elgin, New Brunswick, the son of John F. Ogden, of United Empire Loyalist descent, and was educated there. Ogden settled in Cape Canso, Nova Scotia. In 1866, he married Annie Cook. Ogden was unsuccessful in bids for reelection to the House of Commons in 1882 and 1891. He died in Bedford, Nova Scotia at the age of 75.

== Electoral record ==
1878 Canadian federal election: Guysborough
Party	Candidate	Votes
Conservative	Alfred Ogden	936
Liberal	John Angus Kirk	772

1882 Canadian federal election: Guysborough
Party	Candidate	Votes
Liberal	John Angus Kirk	818
Conservative	Alfred Ogden	628

1891 Canadian federal election: Guysborough
Party	Candidate	Votes
Liberal	D.C. Fraser	1,145
Conservative	Alfred Ogden	1,059
