= David Honeyman =

Scottish-Canadian Presbyterian minister, geologist, and museum curator (1817-1889)

David Honeyman DCL
- Born: David Honeyman; 1817; Rathillet, Fife, Scotland
- Died: 17 October 1889 (aged 71–72); Halifax, Nova Scotia, Canada
- Occupations: Presbyterian minister; Geologist; Professor; Curator

David Honeyman (1817 – 17 October 1889) was a Scottish-Canadian Presbyterian minister, geologist, professor, and museum curator.

== Early life and education ==
David Honeyman was born in 1817 in Fife, Scotland.

He completed his early education at the High School of Dundee. Enrolled at the University of St Andrews, he studied natural science and oriental languages. His studies placed particular emphasis on geology and the Hebrew language. At the Museum of the Watts Institute of Dundee (now The McManus), he collaborated on his first geological project, organizing minerals, rocks, and fossils.

== Career ==
In addition to his studies, he dedicated himself to theology and eventually became licensed to preach by the early 1840s. He was a member of the Free Church of Scotland. Affiliated with the Presbytery of Dundee, he served as a Probationer of the United Secession Church until 1847. Planning to travel to the American colonies, Honeyman obtained a letter of commendation from the Presbytery in 1848. That year, he accepted a position as a Hebrew professor at the Free Church College in Halifax, Nova Scotia. By 1850, he joined the Presbyterian Church of Nova Scotia and became an ordained minister. He briefly served in Halifax before taking on the ministry of the Presbyterian congregation in Shubenacadie. The Presbyterian minister relocated to the town of Antigonish in 1853.

After reading John William Dawson's 1855 "Acadian Geology", Honeyman renewed his focus to geology, leaving his ministry role in the late 1850s. His first scientific paper, published in 1859, focused on the fossiliferous rocks of Arisaig in Antigonish County.

=== International exhibitions ===
Honeyman analyzed auriferous rocks at "Allen's" and "Laidlaw's" goldfields near Halifax in 1861 for the provincial commission of the International Exhibition. He published "On the Geology of the Gold-fields of Nova Scotia" in February 1862. Shortly after, he served as Nova Scotia's assistant commissioner at the 1862 International Exhibition. Travelling to London, he was awarded a medal for his geological collection.

Honeyman gained an international reputation and held membership in numerous geological societies by the 1860s. He became a member of the Société géologique de France on 3 November 1862. He was elected to the Geological Society of London, Geological Society of America, and designated a corresponding member of the Society of Arts. The Horticultural Society of London admitted him on 5 December 1862.

Honeyman published a report on the geological survey of Nova Scotia and Cape Breton in 1864. It featured a section on minerals by Henry How. In 1864, King's College awarded Honeyman an honorary Doctor of Civil Law for his work with How summarizing Nova Scotia's geology for the 1862 Exhibition.

Honeyman was named Nova Scotia Commissioner for the Dublin International Exhibition of 1865, overseeing the province's exhibits and winning another medal in the geology category. He also collaborated with Professor Thomas Croxen Archer, an expert in botany. Sir William Fenwick Williams, Lieutenant Governor of Nova Scotia, granted him the role of "Commissioner" for the Nova Scotia Department at the 1867 Paris Exhibition. At the exhibition in Paris, he won a medal in the geology section.

=== Nova Scotian Institute of Science ===
Honeyman, named the "Provincial Geologist," became a member of the Nova Scotian Institute of Science on 3 December 1867, acknowledged as the leading authority on the field. His observations were frequently published in the Proceedings of the Institute of Natural Science of Nova Scotia.

=== Nova Scotia Museum ===
The Nova Scotia geologist advocated for a venue to display his geological exhibits alongside collections from the Nova Scotian Institute of Science and the defunct Halifax Mechanics' Institute. Honeyman was appointed as the first curator of the newly established Nova Scotia Museum in 1868. With no salary or government funding for three years, he was approached by William Garvie, leading to a $1,200 salary and a small budget in 1872.

Honeyman represented Nova Scotia in Philadelphia at the 1876 Centenniel Exhibition. In 1878, he was appointed as the first geology professor at Dalhousie College upon the establishment of the college's Department of Science and first geology program. He began his first term as Professor of Geology, Paleontology, and Mineralogy in 1879. He served in the role until 1883.

Appointed the executive commissioner for Canada at London's International Fisheries Exhibition in 1883, he chronicled the experience in his 1887 book "Giants and Pigmies."

Serving as secretary for the Provincial Museum's council, Honeyman read a paper on geological excursions in December 1884 and another on Louisbourg in April 1885. In 1887, he began mentoring Canadian historian Harry Piers, who later succeeded him at the Provincial Museum of Nova Scotia.

== Death ==
Honeyman died on 17 October 1889 in Halifax, Nova Scotia, Canada. Stricken by apoplexy, he died suddenly on his way home after closing the museum. Survived by his wife and four daughters, he was laid to rest in the Halifax cemetery on 20 October 1889, with a large procession of leading citizens in attendance.

== Works ==
- Report of Nova Scotia Commissioners for International Exhibition 1862 (1862)
- On the Geology of the Gold-fields of Nova Scotia (1862)
- On the Geology of Arisaig, Nova Scotia (1864)
- Geological Notes of Excursions with Members of the British Association (1884)
- On Louisburg—Past and Present—A Historical Geological Sketch (1885)
- On New Nova Scotia Fishes (1885)
- Nova Scotia Ichthyology (1885)
- Giants and Pygmies (1887)
