= Thomas Twining Keefler =

Canadian politician

Member of the Canadian Parliament for Lunenburg
- In office 1882–1883
- Preceded by: Charles Edwin Kaulbach
- Succeeded by: Charles Edwin Kaulbach

Personal details
- Born: March 26, 1824 Halifax, Nova Scotia
- Died: November 16, 1906 (aged 82)
- Party: Liberal

Thomas Twining Keefler (March 26, 1824 – November 16, 1906) was a merchant and political figure in Nova Scotia, Canada. He represented Lunenburg in the House of Commons of Canada from 1882 to 1883 as a Liberal member.

He was born in Halifax, of Austrian descent. In 1870, he married Lydia Sophia Tupper. Keefler supported an elected senate. His election in 1882 was declared void and he was defeated by Charles Edwin Kaulbach in the by-election which followed in 1883.

== Electoral record ==
1882 Canadian federal election: Lunenburg
Party	Candidate	Votes
Liberal	Thomas T. Keefler	1,169
Conservative	Charles Edwin Kaulbach	1,032

By-election on 10 October 1883 On election being declared void
Party	Candidate	Votes
Conservative	Charles Edwin Kaulbach	1,991
Liberal	Thomas Twining Keefler	1,712
