= Francis Parker McHeffey =

Canadian politician from Nova Scotia (1851–1927)

Member of the Nova Scotia House of Assembly for Hants County
- In office October 2, 1901 – June 19, 1906

Personal details
- Born: November 26, 1851 Shubenacadie, Nova Scotia
- Died: December 26, 1927 (aged 76) Vancouver, British Columbia
- Party: Liberal
- Spouse: Janie Currie
- Occupation: tanner, dairy farmer, politician

Francis Parker McHeffey (November 26, 1851 – December 26, 1927) was a tanner, dairy farmer, and political figure in Nova Scotia, Canada. He represented Hants County in the Nova Scotia House of Assembly from 1901 to 1906 as a Liberal member.

McHeffey was born in 1851 at Shubenacadie, Nova Scotia to Richard McHeffey and Margaret Keys. He married Janie Currie on September 19, 1878. He served as a councillor for the Municipality of East Hants. Around 1906, he moved to Vancouver, British Columbia, where he died in 1927. He was elected in the 1901 Nova Scotia general election but was unsuccessful in the 1906 Nova Scotia general election.
