= John Lothrop Brown =

Canadian politician (1815–1887)

John Lothrop Brown (November 15, 1815 – January 13, 1887) was a farmer, merchant and political figure in Nova Scotia, Canada. He represented Kings County in the Nova Scotia House of Assembly from 1859 to 1863.

He was born in Horton, Nova Scotia, the son of Charles Brown and Frances Lothrop. Brown married Elizabeth Whidden. He died in Wolfville, Nova Scotia at the age of 72.

His brother Edward L. Brown also served in the provincial assembly.
