= Edmund Mortimer McDonald =

Canadian politician

Member of the Canadian Parliament for Lunenburg
- In office 1867–1872
- Preceded by: District created
- Succeeded by: Charles Edward Church

Personal details
- Born: September 25, 1825 West River, Nova Scotia, Canada
- Died: May 25, 1874 (aged 48) Halifax, Nova Scotia, Canada
- Party: Anti-Confederate; Liberal

Edmund Mortimer McDonald (September 29, 1825 – May 25, 1874) was a Nova Scotia journalist, publisher and political figure. He represented Lunenburg in the House of Commons of Canada as an Anti-Confederate and then a Liberal-Conservative from 1868 to 1872.

== Early life ==
He was born in West River, Nova Scotia in 1825.

== Before politics ==
He worked as a journalist with Joseph Howe on the Novascotian during the 1840s. In 1847, he became the owner of the Eastern Chronicle at New Glasgow. He served as Queen's Printer for Nova Scotia from 1860 to 1863. In 1863, he founded the Halifax Citizen with William Garvie; the paper favoured a maritime union but opposed Confederation. McDonald and Garvie also helped found the Anti-confederation League, which had the same aims.

== Political career ==
In 1867, he was elected to the House of Commons and lobbied for the removal of Nova Scotia from the union and for repealing of the British North America Act for Nova Scotia. When Howe was able to negotiate better terms for the province in 1869, McDonald threw his support behind Sir John A. Macdonald.

== Later life and death ==
In 1872, he was named customs inspector for the port of Halifax. He died at Halifax in 1874.
