= Elizabeth Frame =

Canadian historian (1820–1904)

- Born: Elizabeth Murdoch Frame; 1820; Shubenacadie, Nova Scotia, Canada
- Died: 17 November 1904 (aged 83–84); Shubenacadie, Nova Scotia, Canada
- Occupations: Writer; historian
- Relatives: Archibald Frame (brother)

Elizabeth Murdoch Frame (1820 – 17 November 1904) was a Canadian writer and historian from Nova Scotia. Born in Shubenacadie, she attended the Provincial Normal College and spent 30 years working as a public school teacher. Beginning her writing career in the 1860s, she was hesitant to publish under her own name as a woman, thus choosing the pseudonym "A Nova Scotian" for her first book. She was the author of two fiction books and four papers for the Royal Nova Scotia Historical Society, becoming the first woman to prepare a paper for the society in 1879. She was made an honorary life member of the Massachusetts Historical Society in 1892 for her work concerning the study of Mi'kmaq place names in Nova Scotia.

== Early life and education ==
Frame was born in 1820 in Shubenacadie, Nova Scotia, to parents John Frame and Janet Sutherland. She was the eldest of 10 children, and her family was well-connected with prominent merchant and clergy families in Nova Scotia. Her grandfather, Matthew Frame, immigrated to Nova Scotia from Northern Ireland in the late 18th century.

As a child, Frame studied at a private school for girls in Halifax ran by John Sparrow Thompson. She was an active Presbyterian, serving as a founding teacher at the Shubenacadie Sunday School in her early 20s. She attended the Truro Academy in her 20s, followed by the Provincial Normal College where she was educated to become a public school teacher.

== Career ==
Frame began teaching at the age of 28. Beginning in 1848, she taught in schools across the province in communities such as Shubenacadie, Truro, Dartmouth, and Maitland; while teaching in Maitland, she also taught navigation to ship captains. Frame used her income as a teacher to support her brother, William, in receiving his theology education at the University of Edinburgh.

Frame began her career as a writer in the 1860s. She published her first book, Descriptive sketches of Nova Scotia in prose and verse (1864), under the pseudonym "A Nova Scotian" as she was hesitant to publish under her own name as a woman. The book is a work of fiction aimed at younger readers. Her next book, The Twilight of Faith, was published in 1871 and is also a work of fiction, dedicated to her father. Beyond her fiction, Frame wrote extensively on the topics of local history, Canadian women, and the history of the Mi'kmaq. She was the first woman to prepare a paper for the Royal Nova Scotia Historical Society, although she was not a member and never attended their meetings. Frame wrote a total of four papers for the society between 1879 and 1892. She was an acquaintance of Francis Parkman and travelled to Boston where she studied documents relating to Nova Scotia. In June 1892, she was made an life honorary member of the Massachusetts Historical Society after presenting a paper on Mi'kmaq place names in Nova Scotia. She subsequently began writing for local newspapers, publishing an account of the history of the Mi'kmaq in the Halifax Herald in December 1892. She wrote a series on Canadian pioneer women in June 1897, published in the Halifax Herald a week before the meeting of the National Council of Women of Canada in Halifax. In 1898, she published an account of the life of Phillis Wheatley, an 18th-century slave in Boston.

Frame died in Shubenacadie on 17 November 1904. She never married.

== Publications ==
=== Books ===
- Frame, Elizabeth (1864). Descriptive sketches of Nova Scotia in prose and verse. Halifax, NS: A & W MacKinlay. OCLC 20495864.
- — (1871). The Twilight of Faith. Boston: H.D. Brown. OCLC 71763571.
- — (1872). The Twilight of Faith (2nd ed.). Toronto: Hunter, Rose & Company. OCLC 7652473.
- — (1892). A list of Micmac names of places, rivers, etc., in Nova Scotia . Cambridge, MA: John Wilson and Son. OCLC 3506998 – via Wikisource.

=== Articles ===
- — (1879). Historical Shubenacadie. Royal Nova Scotia Historical Society. (Note: Presented to the Royal Nova Scotia Historical Society on 2 January 1879. Later republished in the Windsor Courier on 17 October 1885.)
- — (1881). "Rev. James Murdoch, 1767–1799". Collections of the Royal Nova Scotia Historical Society. 2. Royal Nova Scotia Historical Society: 100–109.
- — (30 December 1892). "The Micmacs: brief history of the [a]borigines of the province". Halifax Herald. pp. 1, 4.
- — (8 June 1897). "The pioneer women of Nova Scotia". Halifax Herald.
- — (9 June 1897). "The heroines of Nova Scotia". Halifax Herald.
- — (11 June 1897). "The pioneer heroines of Canada, brave women of the past". Halifax Herald.
- — (26 July 1897). "Heroines of our own times". Halifax Herald. p. 5.
- — (17 December 1898). "Boston had slaves, so had Halifax". Halifax Herald. p. 9.
- — (10 February 1899). "Folk lore at Stewiacke". Halifax Herald. p. 5.
