= Archibald Frame =

Canadian politician from Nova Scotia (1831–1909)

Member of the Nova Scotia House of Assembly for Hants County
- In office June 15, 1886 – May 20, 1890

Personal details
- Born: March 2, 1831 Shubenacadie, Nova Scotia
- Died: December 23, 1909 (aged 78) Halifax, Nova Scotia
- Party: Liberal
- Spouse(s): Emma Elizabeth Roach Smith; Lavinia A. Cochran
- Relations: Elizabeth Frame (sister)
- Education: Dalhousie University
- Occupation: merchant, politician

Archibald Frame (March 2, 1831 – December 23, 1909) was a merchant and political figure in Nova Scotia, Canada. He represented Hants County in the Nova Scotia House of Assembly from 1886 to 1890 as a Liberal member.

Frame was born in 1831 at Shubenacadie, Nova Scotia to John and Janet Sutherland Frame. He was educated at Truro Academy and Dalhousie College. He married Emma Elizabeth Roach Smith and later Lavinia A. Cochran, daughter of Arthur McNutt Cochran. He served as warden of East Hants and as a justice of the peace. From 1896 until his death, he served as inspector of weights. Frame lived in Maitland, Nova Scotia until 1896, when he moved to Halifax, Nova Scotia, where he died in 1909. Frame was initially unsuccessful in the 1882 Nova Scotia general election, and was elected in the 1886 election, but was unsuccessful in the 1890 Nova Scotia general election.

== Works ==
- Selmah in 1853 - a paper read before the Presbyterian Social in Selmah, Maitland, Hants County, Nova Scotia (1894). Halifax Herald Print.
