= William Duff (Canadian politician) =

Canadian politician (1872–1953)

The Honourable William Duff Jr.
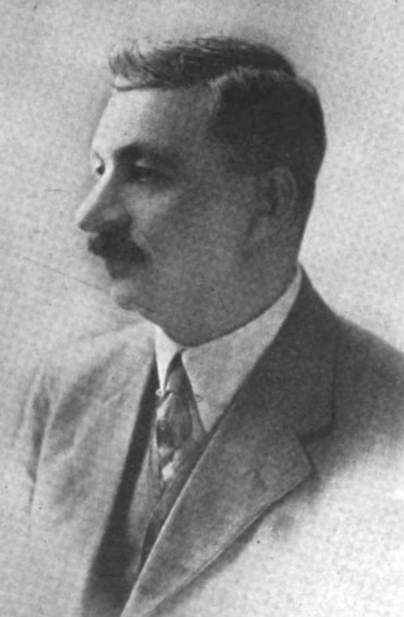

Senator for Lunenburg, Nova Scotia
- In office 28 February 1936 – 25 April 1953
- Appointed by: William Lyon Mackenzie King

Personal details
- Born: 28 April 1872 Carbonear, Newfoundland
- Died: 25 April 1953 (aged 80) Lunenburg, Nova Scotia, Canada
- Party: Liberal

William Duff Jr. (28 April 1872 – 25 April 1953) was a merchant, ship owner and political figure in Nova Scotia, Canada. He represented Lunenburg from 1917 to 1925, Queens—Lunenburg from 1925 to 1926 and Antigonish—Guysborough from 1927 to 1936 in the House of Commons of Canada as a Liberal member. Duff represented Lunenburg division in the Senate of Canada from 1936 until his death in 1953.

== Early life ==
He was born in Carbonear, Newfoundland, the son of William Duff, and educated in Carbonear and in Scotland.

== Career ==
He settled at Bridgewater, Nova Scotia, where he married Jennie E. Oxner. He became the publisher of the Bridgewater Enterprise and then the Lunenburg Progress, later amalgamating the two newspapers as the Lunenburg Progress-Enterprise. Duff was also involved in fishing and was president of the Lunenburg Marine Railway Company and the Lunenburg Mutual Marine Insurance Company. He was mayor of Lunenburg from 1916 to 1922. Duff served as deputy speaker in 1926. He was defeated in a bid for reelection in 1926 in Queens—Lunenburg and then was elected in Antigonish—Guysborough in a by-election held later that year following the death of John C. Douglas.

== Death ==
In 1953, Duff died of a heart attack at home in Lunenburg while still a member of the Senate.

== Electoral record ==
1935 Canadian federal election: Antigonish—Guysborough
Party	Candidate	Votes
Liberal	William Duff	7,779
Reconstruction	John Howard MacKichan	3,783

1917 Canadian federal election: Lunenburg
Party	Candidate	Votes
Opposition (Laurier Liberals)	William Duff	4,699
Government (Unionist)	Joseph Willis Margeson	3,861

1921 Canadian federal election: Lunenburg
Party	Candidate	Votes
Liberal	William Duff	7,899
Conservative	Dugald Stewart	4,541
