= Dugald Stewart (Canadian politician) =

Canadian politician

Member of the Canadian Parliament for Lunenburg
- In office 1911–1917
- Preceded by: John Drew Sperry
- Succeeded by: William Duff

Personal details
- Born: December 5, 1862 Upper Musquodoboit, Nova Scotia, British North America
- Died: November 7, 1932 (aged 69) Bridgewater, Nova Scotia, Canada
- Party: Conservative

Dugald Stewart (December 5, 1862 – November 7, 1932) was a Canadian physician and politician, who served as a member of the House of Commons of Canada from 1911 to 1917.

Born in Upper Musquodoboit, Nova Scotia, the son of John Sprott Stewart and Sarah J. Archibald, Stewart was educated at Pictou Academy and Dalhousie College, receiving a Bachelor of Arts degree in 1886. Stewart was principal of Shelburne County Academy from 1897 to 1898. He then studied medicine at the New York University School of Medicine, receiving an M.D. in 1892. After graduating, he settled in Bridgewater, Nova Scotia and started a medical practice. Stewart married Dora H. Kelley in 1892.

He was elected to the Town Council of Bridgewater in 1901 and was mayor for four successive terms from 1907 to 1910. He was elected to the House of Commons for the electoral district of Lunenburg in the 1911 federal election. A Conservative, he did not run in the 1917 election and was defeated when he ran in the 1921 election.

Stewart served as a major in the military headquarters at Halifax during World War I, taking part in the examination and care of recruits from the Atlantic provinces.

He died in Bridgewater at the age of 69.

== Electoral record ==
1911 Canadian federal election: Lunenburg
| Party | Candidate | Votes |
|---|---|---|
| Conservative | Dugald Stewart | 3,645 |
| Liberal | John Drew Sperry | 3,237 |
