= Duncan Cameron Fraser =

Canadian politician (1845–1910)

The Honourable Duncan Cameron Fraser
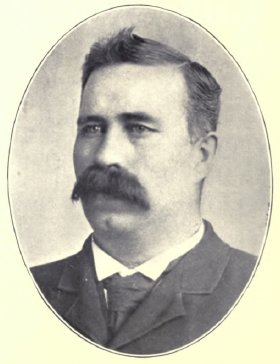

9th Lieutenant Governor of Nova Scotia
- In office 27 March 1906 – 27 September 1910
- Monarchs: Edward VII; George V
- Governor General: The Earl Grey
- Premier: George Henry Murray
- Preceded by: Alfred Gilpin Jones
- Succeeded by: James Drummond McGregor

Member of the Canadian Parliament for Guysborough
- In office 5 March 1891 – 9 February 1904
- Preceded by: John Angus Kirk
- Succeeded by: John Howard Sinclair

Member of the Legislative Council of Nova Scotia
- In office 4 February 1887 – 5 March 1891

Personal details
- Born: 1 October 1845 Brooklyn (Plymouth), Pictou County, Nova Scotia
- Died: 27 September 1910 (aged 64) Fort Point, near Guysborough, Nova Scotia, Canada
- Party: Liberal
- Spouse: Elizabeth (Bessie) Grant Graham
- Relations: Alistair Fraser (grandson)
- Children: Anne Fraser; Sarah Fraser; Alistair Fraser; Margaret Fraser; James Fraser
- Education: Dalhousie College
- Occupation: lawyer, judge
- Profession: politician

Duncan Cameron Fraser (1 October 1845 – 27 September 1910) was a Canadian lawyer, politician, judge, and the ninth Lieutenant Governor of Nova Scotia.

He was born in Pictou County, Nova Scotia, the son of Alexander Fraser and Ann Chisholm. He studied at Dalhousie College, and went on to article in law. He was admitted to the bar in 1873 and set up practice in New Glasgow. He married Bessie Grant Graham in 1878. In the same year, he ran unsuccessfully for a seat in the provincial assembly. Fraser was a member of the province's Legislative Council from 1887 to 1891, also serving as a minister without portfolio in the Executive Council. He was elected to the House of Commons of Canada for the riding of Guysborough in the 1891 federal election. A Liberal, he was re-elected in the 1896 and 1900 elections.

From 1904 to 1906, he was a judge of the Supreme Court of Nova Scotia. In 1906, he was appointed lieutenant governor of Nova Scotia and served until his death in 1910.

His daughter, Margaret Marjory Fraser, was a nursing sister in World War I. She, then 33 years old, served as the matron of the 14 nurses on the last voyage of the hospital ship HMHS Llandovery Castle when it was torpedoed and sunk by a German submarine in 1918. All of the 14 nurses died. His son, Lieut. James Gibson Laurier Fraser, was killed in action in France on 4 March 1918, aged 22; another son, Alistair Fraser, served as Lieutenant-Governor of Nova Scotia from 1952 to 1958.

== Electoral record ==
1891 Canadian federal election: Guysborough
| Party | Candidate | Votes |
|---|---|---|
| Liberal | D.C. Fraser | 1,145 |
| Conservative | Alfred Ogden | 1,059 |

1896 Canadian federal election: Guysborough
| Party | Candidate | Votes |
|---|---|---|
| Liberal | Duncan C. Fraser | 1,533 |
| Conservative | C. Ernest Gregory | 1,455 |

1900 Canadian federal election: Guysborough
| Party | Candidate | Votes |
|---|---|---|
| Liberal | Duncan C. Fraser | 1,928 |
| Conservative | C. Ernest Gregory | 1,589 |

By-election: On Mr. Fraser's nomination as Judge of the Supreme Court of Nova Scotia, 10 February 1904
