= Charles Edward Church =

Canadian politician

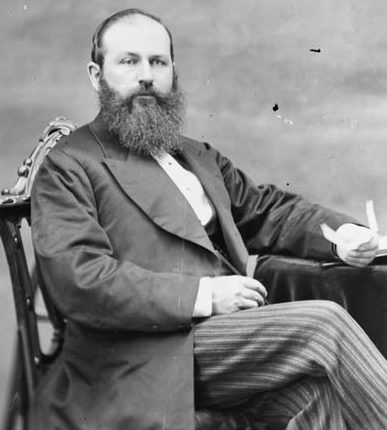

Member of the Canadian Parliament for Lunenburg
- In office 1872–1878
- Preceded by: Edmund Mortimer McDonald
- Succeeded by: Charles Edwin Kaulbach

Member of the Nova Scotia House of Assembly for Lunenburg
- In office 1882–1901

Senator from Nova Scotia
- In office 1902–1906

Personal details
- Born: January 3, 1835 Tancook Island, Lunenburg County, Nova Scotia
- Died: January 3, 1906 (aged 71) Halifax, Nova Scotia, Canada
- Party: Liberal
- Other political affiliations: Nova Scotia Liberal Party
- Spouse: Henrietta A. Pugsley
- Cabinet: Commissioner of Works and Mines (1882-1884); Provincial Secretary (1884-1891 & 1896-1901)

Charles Edward Church (January 3, 1835 – January 3, 1906) was a Canadian politician.

== Early life and education ==
Born in Tancook Island, Lunenburg County, Nova Scotia, the son of Charles Lott Anthony Church and Sarah Hiltz, Church was educated in Chester and Truro, Nova Scotia.

== Career ==
He was a school teacher for over ten years and then he started in business as a merchant. In 1884, Church married Henrietta A. Pugsley. He was first elected to the House of Commons of Canada in 1872 for Lunenburg. A Liberal, he was re-elected in 1874 and was defeated in 1878. From 1874 to 1878, he was Liberal Whip in the House of Commons for the Maritime Provinces.

He was elected in 1882 to the Legislative Assembly of Nova Scotia and sat there until 1902 when he was called to the Senate. Church was Provincial Secretary of Nova Scotia for two years in the William Thomas Pipes administration, and Commissioner of Public Works and Mines for 15 years, in the William Stevens Fielding and George Henry Murray administrations. He was called to the Senate on February 8, 1902, on the advice of Wilfrid Laurier representing the senatorial division of Lunenburg, Nova Scotia. He served until his death in 1906.

He was a grandson of Charles Lot Church.

== Electoral record ==
1872 Canadian federal election: Lunenburg
Party	Candidate	Votes
Liberal	Charles Edward Church	1,338
Unknown	W.H. Owens	1,205
Source: Canadian Elections Database

1874 Canadian federal election: Lunenburg
Party	Candidate	Votes
Liberal	Charles Edward Church	acclaimed
Source: lop.parl.ca

1878 Canadian federal election: Lunenburg
Party	Candidate	Votes
Conservative	Charles Edwin Kaulbach	1,899
Liberal	Charles Edward Church	1,173
