= John Howard Sinclair =

Canadian politician (1848–1924)

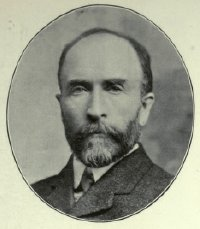

Member of the Canadian Parliament for Antigonish—Guysborough
- In office 1917–1921
- Preceded by: District was created in 1914
- Succeeded by: Colin Francis McIsaac

Member of the Canadian Parliament for Guysborough
- In office 1904–1917
- Preceded by: Duncan Cameron Fraser
- Succeeded by: District was abolished in 1914

Member of the Nova Scotia House of Assembly for Guysborough
- In office 1894–1904

Personal details
- Born: May 27, 1848 Goshen, Nova Scotia
- Died: June 8, 1924 (aged 76)
- Party: Liberal

John Howard Sinclair (May 27, 1848 – June 8, 1924) was a Canadian politician.

Born in Goshen, Guysborough, Nova Scotia, Sinclair was educated in the Common School of Goshen, Guysborough Academy and Dalhousie College, Halifax. A lawyer, he was Mayor of New Glasgow in 1890-91 and member of the Nova Scotia House of Assembly from 1894 to 1904. He was elected to the House of Commons of Canada for Guysborough in a 1904 by-election after the sitting MP, Duncan Cameron Fraser, was appointed a Judge of the Nova Scotia Supreme Court. A Liberal, he was re-elected in 1904, 1908, 1911, and 1917.

== Electoral record ==
1904 Canadian federal election: Guysborough
| Party | Candidate | Votes |
|---|---|---|
| Liberal | John Howard Sinclair | 2,040 |
| Conservative | John S. Wells | 1,492 |

By-election on 16 March 1904
| Party | Candidate | Votes |
| Liberal | John Howard Sinclair | 2,004 |
| Conservative | S.O. Griffin | 1,643 |

1908 Canadian federal election: Guysborough
| Party | Candidate | Votes |
|---|---|---|
| Liberal | John Howard Sinclair | 2,001 |
| Conservative | George Anderson Rowe Rowlings | 1,796 |

1911 Canadian federal election: Guysborough
| Party | Candidate | Votes |
|---|---|---|
| Liberal | John Howard Sinclair | 2,043 |
| Conservative | George Anderson Rowe Rowlings | 1,700 |

1917 Canadian federal election: Antigonish—Guysborough
| Party | Candidate | Votes |
|---|---|---|
| Opposition (Laurier Liberals) | John Howard Sinclair | 3,944 |
| Government (Unionist) | William Alexander Wells | 2,506 |
