= Lunenburg (federal electoral district) =

Former federal electoral district in Nova Scotia, Canada

Nova Scotia electoral district

Defunct federal electoral district
- Legislature: House of Commons
- District created: 1867, 1947
- District abolished: 1924, 1952
- First contested: 1867
- Last contested: 1930

Demographics
- Census division: Lunenburg

Lunenburg was a federal electoral district in Nova Scotia, Canada, that was represented in the House of Commons of Canada from 1867 to 1925 and from 1949 to 1953. Its boundary was that of Lunenburg County, Nova Scotia.

== History ==
The electoral district was created as part of the British North America Act, 1867. In 1924, it became obsolete when consolidated with Queens—Lunenburg riding. In the redistribution of 1947, the riding was re-established from Queens—Lunenburg, and then re-consolidated with the previous riding in 1952.

== Members of Parliament ==
This riding elected the following members of Parliament:

Parliament	Years	Member	Party
Lunenburg
1st	1867–1868	Edmund Mortimer McDonald	Anti-Confederation
1st	1868–1872	Edmund Mortimer McDonald	Liberal–Conservative
2nd	1872–1874	Charles Edward Church	Liberal
3rd	1874–1878	Charles Edward Church	Liberal
4th	1878–1882	Charles Edwin Kaulbach	Conservative
5th	1882–1883	Thomas Twining Keefler	Liberal
5th	1883–1887	Charles Edwin Kaulbach	Conservative
6th	1887–1891	James Daniel Eisenhauer	Liberal
7th	1891–1896	Charles Edwin Kaulbach	Conservative
8th	1896–1900	Charles Edwin Kaulbach	Conservative
9th	1900–1904	Charles Edwin Kaulbach	Conservative
10th	1904–1908	Alexander Kenneth Maclean	Liberal
11th	1908–1909	Alexander Kenneth Maclean	Liberal
11th	1909–1911	John Drew Sperry	Liberal
12th	1911–1917	Dugald Stewart	Conservative
13th	1917–1921	William Duff	Opposition (Laurier Liberals)
14th	1921–1925	William Duff	Liberal
Riding dissolved into Queens—Lunenburg
Riding re-created from Queens—Lunenburg
21st	1949–1953	Robert Winters	Liberal
Riding dissolved into Queens—Lunenburg

== Election results ==
=== Lunenburg, 1867–1925 ===
1867 Canadian federal election
Party	Candidate	Votes
Anti-Confederation	E.M. McDonald	1,557
Unknown	H.A.N. Kaulback	905
Source: Canadian Elections Database

1872 Canadian federal election
Party	Candidate	Votes
Liberal	Charles Edward Church	1,338
Unknown	W.H. Owens	1,205
Source: Canadian Elections Database

1874 Canadian federal election
Party	Candidate	Votes
Liberal	Charles Edward Church	acclaimed
Source: lop.parl.ca

1878 Canadian federal election
Party	Candidate	Votes
Conservative	Charles Edwin Kaulbach	1,899
Liberal	Charles Edward Church	1,173

1882 Canadian federal election
Party	Candidate	Votes
Liberal	Thomas T. Keefler	1,169
Conservative	Charles Edwin Kaulbach	1,032

By-election on 10 October 1883 On election being declared void
Party	Candidate	Votes
Conservative	Charles Edwin Kaulbach	1,991
Liberal	Thomas Twining Keefler	1,712

1887 Canadian federal election
Party	Candidate	Votes
Liberal	James Daniel Eisenhauer	2,430
Conservative	Charles Edwin Kaulbach	2,308

1891 Canadian federal election
Party	Candidate	Votes
Conservative	Charles Edwin Kaulbach	2,592
Liberal	James Daniel Eisenhauer	2,402

1896 Canadian federal election
Party	Candidate	Votes
Conservative	Charles Edwin Kaulbach	2,403
Liberal	John D. Sperry	2,318

1900 Canadian federal election
Party	Candidate	Votes
Conservative	Charles Edwin Kaulbach	2,896
Liberal	Alexander Kenneth Maclean	2,574

1904 Canadian federal election
Party	Candidate	Votes
Liberal	Alexander Kenneth Maclean	3,274
Conservative	Charles Edwin Kaulbach	2,822

1908 Canadian federal election
Party	Candidate	Votes
Liberal	Alexander Kenneth Maclean	3,533
Conservative	Carmon Smith Marshall	3,332

By-election on 22 December 1909 On Mr. McLean's resignation, 23 October 1909
Party	Candidate	Votes
Liberal	John Drew Sperry	3,371
Conservative	Carmon Smith Marshall	3,104

1911 Canadian federal election
Party	Candidate	Votes
Conservative	Dugald Stewart	3,645
Liberal	John Drew Sperry	3,237

1917 Canadian federal election
Party	Candidate	Votes
Opposition (Laurier Liberals)	William Duff	4,699
Government (Unionist)	Joseph Willis Margeson	3,861

1921 Canadian federal election
Party	Candidate	Votes
Liberal	William Duff	7,899
Conservative	Dugald Stewart	4,541

=== Lunenburg, 1949–1953 ===
1949 Canadian federal election
Party	Candidate	Votes
Liberal	Robert Henry Winters	8,829
Progressive Conservative	Melbourne Morton Gardner	7,527
Co-operative Commonwealth	George Herbert Crouse	574

== See also ==
- List of Canadian electoral districts
- Historical federal electoral districts of Canada
