= Charles Edwin Kaulbach =

Canadian politician

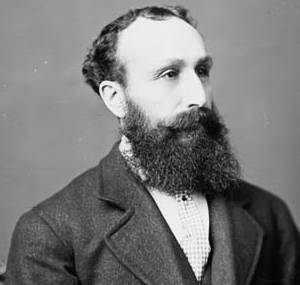

Member of the Canadian Parliament for Lunenburg
- In office 1878–1882
- Preceded by: Charles Edward Church
- Succeeded by: Thomas Twining Keefler

Member of the Canadian Parliament for Lunenburg
- In office 1883–1887
- Preceded by: Thomas Twining Keefler
- Succeeded by: James Daniel Eisenhauer

Member of the Canadian Parliament for Lunenburg
- In office 1891–1904
- Preceded by: James Daniel Eisenhauer
- Succeeded by: Alexander Kenneth Maclean

Personal details
- Born: July 13, 1834 Lunenburg, Nova Scotia
- Died: May 25, 1907 (aged 72) Halifax, Nova Scotia
- Party: Conservative

Charles Edwin Kaulbach (July 13, 1834 – May 25, 1907) was a merchant, ship owner and political figure in Nova Scotia, Canada. He represented Lunenburg in the House of Commons of Canada from 1878 to 1882, from 1883 to 1887 and from 1891 to 1904 as a Conservative member.

== Early life and education ==
He was born in Lunenburg, Nova Scotia, the son of John H. Kaulbach, who was high sheriff for Lunenburg, and Sophia Fredericka Newman. He was educated in Lunenburg.

== Career ==
Kaulbach was a lieutenant-colonel in the militia and also served as high sheriff for Lunenburg. He was also a director of the Lunenburg Marine Insurance Company. He was defeated in the 1882 general election but won a subsequent by-election held in 1883 after the election results were appealed. Kaulbach was defeated in bids for reelection in 1887 and 1904. He died in Halifax, Nova Scotia at the age of 72.

== Personal life ==
His older brother Henry served in the provincial assembly and the Senate of Canada.

== Electoral record ==
1878 Canadian federal election: Lunenburg
Party	Candidate	Votes
Conservative	Charles Edwin Kaulbach	1,899
Liberal	Charles Edward Church	1,173

1882 Canadian federal election: Lunenburg
Party	Candidate	Votes
Liberal	Thomas T. Keefler	1,169
Conservative	Charles Edwin Kaulbach	1,032

By-election on 10 October 1883 On election being declared void
Party	Candidate	Votes
Conservative	Charles Edwin Kaulbach	1,991
Liberal	Thomas Twining Keefler	1,712

1887 Canadian federal election: Lunenburg
Party	Candidate	Votes
Liberal	James Daniel Eisenhauer	2,430
Conservative	Charles Edwin Kaulbach	2,308

1891 Canadian federal election: Lunenburg
Party	Candidate	Votes
Conservative	Charles Edwin Kaulbach	2,592
Liberal	James Daniel Eisenhauer	2,402

1896 Canadian federal election: Lunenburg
Party	Candidate	Votes
Conservative	Charles Edwin Kaulbach	2,403
Liberal	John D. Sperry	2,318

1900 Canadian federal election: Lunenburg
Party	Candidate	Votes
Conservative	Charles Edwin Kaulbach	2,896
Liberal	Alexander Kenneth Maclean	2,574

1904 Canadian federal election: Lunenburg
Party	Candidate	Votes
Liberal	Alexander Kenneth Maclean	3,274
Conservative	Charles Edwin Kaulbach	2,822
