= Nathan Moses =

Canadian politician

MLA for Yarmouth township
- In office 1855–1859

Personal details
- Born: March 2, 1819 Yarmouth, Nova Scotia
- Died: May 6, 1887 (aged 68) Halifax, Nova Scotia
- Occupation: Merchant

Nathan Moses (March 2, 1819 – May 6, 1887) was a merchant and political figure in Nova Scotia. He represented Yarmouth township in the Nova Scotia House of Assembly from 1855 to 1859. Moses was a justice of the peace from 1863 to 1887. He also served as custos rotulorum for Yarmouth from 1873 to 1875. With his partner John K. Ryerson, he was involved in the trade with the West Indies. Moses was also president of the Yarmouth Marine Railway Company, a member of the board of governors for the Yarmouth Seminary and a director of the Yarmouth Gas Light Company, the Yarmouth Steam Navigation Company and the Yarmouth Building Society. He died in Halifax at the age of 68.
