= Robert A. MacLellan =

Canadian politician

MLA for Hants County
- In office 1945–1949
- Preceded by: Alexander Stirling MacMillan
- Succeeded by: riding dissolved

Personal details
- Born: January 29, 1882 Goldboro, Nova Scotia
- Died: March 17, 1968 (aged 86) Windsor, Nova Scotia
- Party: Nova Scotia Liberal Party
- Occupation: physician, surgeon

Robert Augustus MacLellan (January 29, 1882 – March 17, 1968) was a Canadian politician. He represented the electoral district of Hants in the Nova Scotia House of Assembly from 1945 to 1949. He was a member of the Nova Scotia Liberal Party.

MacLellan was born in 1882 at Goldboro, Guysborough County, Nova Scotia. He was educated at Dalhousie University, and was a physician and surgeon by career. He married Lydia J. Poe in 1910, and then Elsie B. (Wallace) Clark in 1943. MacLellan served on the East Hants Municipal School Board. He entered provincial politics in the 1945 election, winning the Hants County riding. In the 1949 election, MacLellan was defeated by 28 votes in the newly established Hants East riding by Progressive Conservative Ernest M. Ettinger. MacLellan died at Windsor, Nova Scotia on March 17, 1968.
