= Charles M. Franchville =

Canadian politician

Charles Muller Francheville (February 24, 1846 – September 10, 1900) was a merchant, ship owner and political figure in Nova Scotia, Canada. He represented Guysborough County in the Nova Scotia House of Assembly from 1874 to 1878 as a Liberal member.

He was born in Guysborough, Nova Scotia, the son of Edward H. Francheville and Sarah Peart. He was a ship's master for several years before becoming a merchant and shipper of goods. Francheville was also a justice of the peace, a major in the militia and an agent for several insurance companies. In 1868, he married Harriet Amelia Jost. He was first elected to the provincial assembly in an 1874 by-election held after John Angus Kirk was elected to the House of Commons of Canada; Francheville was reelected in the general election held later that year. In 1878, he was named to the province's Legislative Council.
