= John Alexander MacDonald (Nova Scotia politician) =

Canadian politician from Nova Scotia (–1938)

Member of the Nova Scotia House of Assembly for Hants County
- In office July 27, 1920 – June 24, 1925

Personal details
- Born: Milford (Halifax), Nova Scotia
- Died: May 8, 1938 Milford, Nova Scotia
- Party: Farmers' Party
- Spouse: Henrietta J. Wardrope
- Occupation: farmer, politician

John Alexander MacDonald (unknown – May 8, 1938) was a farmer and political figure in Nova Scotia, Canada. He represented Hants County in the Nova Scotia House of Assembly from 1920 to 1925 as a Farmers' Party member. MacDonald was born at Milford (Halifax), Nova Scotia to Donald MacDonald and Catherine Ferguson. He married Henrietta J. Wardrope on October 14, 1886. MacDonald died in 1938 at Milford, Nova Scotia.

He was elected in the 1920 Nova Scotia general election and did not contest the 1925 Nova Scotia general election.
