= John Taylor (Nova Scotia politician) =

Canadian politician in Nova Scotia

- Born: 1816; Montrose, Angus, Scotland
- Died: June 16, 1881 (aged 64–65); Halifax, Nova Scotia
- Occupations: Merchant, politician

John Taylor (1816 – June 16, 1881) was a British-born merchant and political figure in Nova Scotia. He represented Halifax County in the Nova Scotia House of Assembly from 1873 to 1874 as a Liberal member.

He was born in Montrose. Taylor was involved in the West Indies trade. He was also president of Ocean Marine Insurance Association and served as a director for the Nova Scotia Mutual Fire Insurance Company and the Springhill and Parrsboro Coal and Railway Company. Taylor was elected to the provincial assembly in an 1873 by-election held after the death of William Garvie. He died in Halifax due to an accident.
