= John Flynn (cricketer) =

Australian cricketer

Personal information
- Born: 29 June 1890; Sydney, Australia
- Died: 28 May 1952 (aged 61); Chatswood, New South Wales, Australia
- Source: ESPNcricinfo, 28 December 2016

John Flynn (29 June 1890 – 28 May 1952) was an Australian cricketer. He played two first-class matches for New South Wales in 1914/15.

== See also ==
- List of New South Wales representative cricketers
