= John Barnhill Dickie =

Canadian politician (1829–1886)

MLA for Colchester County
- In office 1874–1878

Speaker of the Nova Scotia House of Assembly
- In office 1874–1875
- Preceded by: Jared C. Troop
- Succeeded by: Mather Byles DesBrisay

Personal details
- Born: March 30, 1829 Cornwallis, Nova Scotia, Nova Scotia
- Died: June 5, 1886 (aged 57) Truro, Nova Scotia
- Party: Independent
- Occupation: teacher, farmer

John Barnhill Dickie (March 30, 1829 – June 5, 1886) was a farmer, teacher and political figure in Nova Scotia, Canada. He represented Colchester County in the Nova Scotia House of Assembly from 1874 to 1878 as an independent member.

He was born in Cornwallis, Nova Scotia, the son of Isaac Patton Dickie and Rebecca Barnhill. Dickie was educated at the Mount Allison Academy and the Halifax Free Church College. He married Ellen Putnam in 1850. Dickie was named coroner for Colchester County in 1854. By 1856, he had settled in Onslow where he owned a farm and operated a store. In 1858, he married Harriet Dickson. Dickie was treasurer for the poor, a justice of the peace and also, for a time, a major in the militia. He helped found the Onslow Agricultural Society, serving as its first president. He moved to Truro in 1871, where he was part owner of several ships and also helped found the Truro Marine Insurance Company. In March 1875, he was named speaker for the provincial assembly. In May 1875, he resigned as speaker after a resolution was passed in the house requesting his resignation. In 1878, he became a member of the province's Legislative Council, remaining a member until his death of intestinal cancer in Truro at the age of 57. One of his grandchildren was Martin Henry Dawson.
