= John Joseph Flynn =

American paleontologist (born 1955)

- Born: August 10, 1955; Wilkes-Barre, Pennsylvania, U.S.
- Education: Yale University (B.Sc., 1977); Columbia University (M.A., 1979; M.Phil., 1980; Ph.D., 1983)
- Known for: Research on mammalian and vertebrate evolution Fieldwork in South America, Madagascar, and India; Curation of major fossil mammal collections at AMNH
- Awards: Alfred Sherwood Romer Prize (1982); Joseph T. Gregory Award (2007); AAAS Fellow (2009)
- Scientific career
- Fields: Paleontology, Geology, Evolutionary biology
- Workplaces: Rutgers University; University of Chicago; Field Museum of Natural History; American Museum of Natural History

John Joseph Flynn often written as John J. Flynn (born August 10, 1955) is an American paleontologist. He serves as the “Frick Curator of fossil mammals” and Dean of the Richard Gilder Graduate School at the American Museum of Natural History (AMNH).

== Biography ==
Flynn earned his Bachelor of Science in Geology and Geophysics from Yale University in 1977. He completed a Master of Arts (1979), a Master of Philosophy (1980), and a Ph.D. in Earth and Environmental Sciences (1983) at Columbia University, with his dissertation titled Correlation and geochronology of Middle Eocene strata from the western United States.

From January to May 1982, he was a lecturer in geology and geophysics at Yale University. Between 1982 and 1987, he served as Assistant Professor in the Department of Earth and Planetary Sciences at Rutgers University. From 1985 to 2005, he was a lecturer in the Department of Biological Sciences at the American Museum of Natural History, as part of the Ecology and Evolution program. He also served as a visiting professor at the University of Chile from 2001 to 2002.

Since 2005, Flynn has been a research faculty member with the New York Consortium in Evolutionary Primatology and a lecturer in the Departments of Earth and Environmental Sciences at Columbia University and Biology at the City University of New York.

His research focuses on the evolution of mammals and Mesozoic vertebrates, molecular and morphological phylogenetics of carnivorans and other mammal groups, biogeography, geochronology, paleomagnetism, and mammalian biostratigraphy.

== Career ==
In 1989, Flynn became Associate Chair and Lecturer in Evolutionary Biology at the University of Chicago. He previously served as a curator in the Department of Geology at the Field Museum of Natural History. Since 1985, he has been a research associate at the American Museum of Natural History, where he curated exhibitions such as Extreme Mammals and Whales.

Flynn has authored over 150 scientific publications and written for Scientific American, Natural History, and National Geographic. He has reviewed numerous popular science books, appeared in radio and television programs, and contributed to educational media.

He has led more than 60 paleontological expeditions across Chile, Peru, Colombia, Madagascar, Angola, India, and the Rocky Mountains, supported by the National Science Foundation, National Geographic Society, and NASA. In 2001, he received a Guggenheim Fellowship for his research in South America.

Flynn’s career has been dedicated to studying major fossil sites to deepen understanding of mammalian phylogeny and evolutionary history. His work has advanced methods of rock and fossil dating, improving geological timescales. He also contributed significantly to the expansion of the AMNH’s mammalian fossil collections.

His field research has uncovered key fossils, including the early primate Chilecebus and ancient rodents suggesting an African origin of New World groups. Expeditions in Madagascar yielded important Mesozoic vertebrate fossils, including Cynodontia, Archosauria, and Rhynchosauria from the Late Triassic, as well as Jurassic mammals from the group Tribosphenida—the oldest known of their kind.

== Professional affiliations ==
Flynn has served as Secretary (1993–1996), Vice President (1996), and President (1999–2001) of the Society of Vertebrate Paleontology, and was on its Executive Committee from 1993 to 2002.

He is a member of the Geological Society of America, American Geophysical Union, Sigma Xi, and the Paleontological Society.

He also serves on the Peabody Museum Leadership Board at Yale University.

== Personal life ==
Flynn has been married since 1982 and has two children.

== Awards ==
- Alfred Sherwood Romer Prize (1982)
- Joseph T. Gregory Award (2007)
- AAAS Fellow (2009)
