= Charles Smith Wilcox =

Canadian politician (1852–1909)

Charles Smith Wilcox (December 21, 1852 – October 10, 1909) was a merchant and politician in Nova Scotia, Canada. He represented Hants County in the Nova Scotia House of Assembly from 1894 to 1901 and from 1906 to 1909 as a Liberal-Conservative member.

He was born in Windsor, Nova Scotia, the son of James Wilcox and Ellen Smith, and was educated at King's College School there. He owned a hardware business and was a director of the Windsor Foundry and Machine Company. Wilcox married Emma Gertrude Thorn. He was mayor of Windsor from 1894 to 1895. Wilcox also served on the board of governors for King's College. During his time in the assembly, Wilcox supported leasing crown lands rather than issuing grants; he also lobbied for temperance legislation. He died in Windsor at the age of 56.
