= Thomas Johnston (Canadian politician) =

Canadian politician from Nova Scotia (1821–1903)

Member of the Nova Scotia House of Assembly for Shelburne
- In office September 18, 1867 – September 16, 1878

Member of the Nova Scotia House of Assembly for Shelburne
- In office June 20, 1882 – July 30, 1903

Personal details
- Born: October 30, 1821 Shelburne, Nova Scotia
- Died: July 30, 1903 (aged 81) Halifax, Nova Scotia
- Party: Liberal
- Spouse: Jerusha Todd
- Occupation: merchant, politician

Thomas Johnston (October 30, 1821 – July 30, 1903) was a merchant and political figure in Nova Scotia, Canada. He represented Shelburne in the Nova Scotia House of Assembly from 1867 to 1878 and again from 1882 until his death in 1903 as a Liberal member. His name also appears as Thomas Johnson in some sources.

Johnson was born in 1821 at Shelburne, Nova Scotia to Thomas Johnson and Agnes Muir. He married Jerusha Todd on April 5, 1866. He served as sheriff of Shelburne from 1857 to 1864. Johnson was a member of the Executive Council from August 3, 1882, to July 28, 1884, and again from July 20, 1896, to 1901. He died in 1903 at Halifax, Nova Scotia.

He was elected in the 1867 Nova Scotia general election, re-elected in subsequent elections in 1871, and 1874. He returned to the House in the 1882 Nova Scotia general election, and held the seat until his death in 1903.
