= Thomas Barlow Smith =

Canadian politician (1839–1933)

MLA for Hants County
- In office 1874, from 1878 to 1882 and from 1890 to 1894

Personal details
- Born: October 28, 1839 Windsor, Nova Scotia
- Died: July 22, 1933 (aged 93) Windsor, Nova Scotia
- Party: Liberal-Conservative
- Spouse: Azubah Scott

Thomas Barlow Smith (October 28, 1839 – July 22, 1933) was a merchant, ship builder, author and political figure in Nova Scotia, Canada. He represented Hants County in the Nova Scotia House of Assembly in 1874, and from 1878 to 1882 as a Liberal and then from 1890 to 1894 as a Liberal-Conservative member.

He was born in Windsor, Nova Scotia, the son of Bennett Smith and Rachel Harris. In 1864, Smith married Azubah Scott. He was elected to the provincial assembly in an 1874 by-election but defeated in the general election that followed later that same year. He died in 1933.

== Publications ==
- Young Lion of the Woods, A Story of Early Colonial Days (1889) at Project Gutenberg also available at Canadiana.ca
- Backward glances (1898) at the Internet Archive
- A seraph on the sea, or, The career of a Highland drummer boy (1891)
