= Arthur Drysdale =

Canadian politician

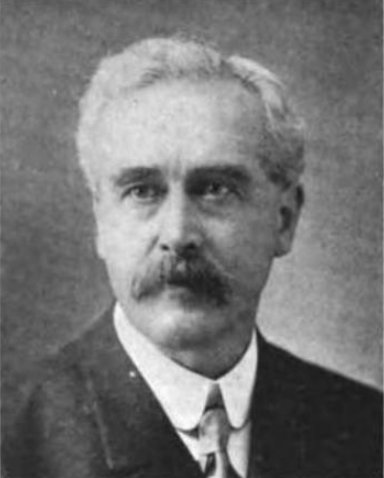

Member of the Nova Scotia House of Assembly
- In office 1891–1907
- Constituency: Hants County

Personal details
- Born: September 5, 1857; Tatamagouche, Nova Scotia
- Died: October 21, 1922 (aged 65); Halifax, Nova Scotia
- Political party: Liberal
- Spouse: Carrie Mitchell (m. 1887)
- Occupation: Lawyer, politician

Arthur Drysdale (born September 5, 1857 – October 21, 1922) was a lawyer and political figure in Nova Scotia, Canada. He represented Hants County in the Nova Scotia House of Assembly from 1891 to 1907 as a Liberal member.

== Biography ==
He was born in Tatamagouche, Nova Scotia, the son of the Malthusian George Drysdale. He was admitted to the bar in 1882. In 1887, he married Carrie Mitchell. Drysdale was first elected to the provincial assembly in an 1891 by-election held after Allen Haley was elected to the House of Commons. In 1893, he was named King's Counsel. Drysdale was commissioner for Public Works and Mines from 1901 to 1905 and attorney general from 1905 to 1907. Drysdale was named to the Supreme Court of Nova Scotia in 1907. In 1909, he was named deputy judge in the Admiralty Court. Drysdale led the inquiry into the Halifax Explosion which found the Mont Blanc liable. However, judge Benjamin Russell later found that there was no evidence to support criminal charges.

He died in Halifax on October 21, 1922.
