= Charles Boudroit =

Canadian politician

Charles Boudroit (c. 1822 – June 30, 1883) was a mariner and political figure in Nova Scotia, Canada. He represented Richmond County in the Nova Scotia House of Assembly from 1874 to 1878 as an independent member.

He was born in Arichat, Nova Scotia, of Acadian descent, and educated there. In 1845, he married Charlotte Forest. He was first elected to the provincial assembly in an 1874 by-election held after Edmund Power Flynn was elected to the House of Commons. In 1878, Boudroit was named to the province's Legislative Council. He died in Liscomb, Guysborough County, Nova Scotia.
