= Stewart Campbell (politician) =

Canadian politician (1812–1885)

Member of the Canadian Parliament for Guysborough
- In office 1867–1874
- Succeeded by: John Angus Kirk

MLA for Guysborough County
- In office 1851–1867

Speaker of the Nova Scotia House of Assembly
- In office 1854–1863
- Preceded by: William Young
- Succeeded by: John Chipman Wade

Personal details
- Born: May 5, 1812 Jamaica
- Died: February 20, 1885 (aged 72) Guysborough, Nova Scotia, Canada
- Party: Anti-Confederate, Liberal-Conservative
- Occupation: lawyer

Stewart Campbell (May 5, 1812 – February 20, 1885) was a Canadian lawyer and politician and a member of the Anti-Confederation Party.

Born in Jamaica, he studied law in England and completed his legal training in Halifax, Nova Scotia, studying with William Young. He practiced law in Halifax and then, some time before 1842, moved to Guysborough, where he also served as a surrogate judge. Campbell represented Guysborough County in the Nova Scotia House of Assembly from 1851 to 1867. He was speaker for the assembly from 1856 to 1863. From 1863 to 1865, Campbell served on a commission to consolidate the statutes for Nova Scotia. On September 20, 1867, he was elected to the House of Commons of Canada as the first member to represent the riding of Guysborough. He was re-elected for a second term on October 12, 1872, but was defeated in an election on January 22, 1874.

Having been opposed to Nova Scotia's entry into the Confederation of Canada in 1860s debates, he remained a member of the Anti-Confederation Party through his first year in office, which was in favour of reversing the decision to join the Confederation. In September 1868 he joined the Liberal-Conservative Party when the Anti-Confederation Party began to collapse, the first MP in Canadian history to cross the floor of Parliament. Spending his last years as a court county judge, he died on February 20, 1885.

== Electoral record ==
1867 Canadian federal election: Guysborough
| Party | Candidate | Votes |
|---|---|---|
| Anti-Confederation | Stewart Campbell | acclaimed |
Source: Canadian Elections Database

1872 Canadian federal election: Guysborough
| Party | Candidate | Votes |
|---|---|---|
| Liberal–Conservative | Stewart Campbell | acclaimed |
Source: Canadian Elections Database

1874 Canadian federal election: Guysborough
| Party | Candidate | Votes |
|---|---|---|
| Liberal | John Angus Kirk | 759 |
| Liberal–Conservative | Stewart Campbell | 544 |
lop.parl.ca
