= Henry Balcom =

Canadian politician

Henry Balcom (October 20, 1804 – July 14, 1882) was a shipbuilder and political figure in Nova Scotia. He represented Halifax County in the Nova Scotia House of Assembly from 1863 to 1871 first as a Reformer and then as a member of the Anti-Confederation Party.

He was the son of Jonas Balcom and Mary Chase. He was married twice: first to Honore Farrell and then to a Mary Quillan. Balcom served as a justice of the peace for Halifax County from 1863 to 1873. He first lived in Salmon River, but later moved to Halifax. He died at Salmon River in Halifax County.
