= Robert Chambers (Canadian politician) =

Canadian politician

Robert Chambers (c.1813 – August 29, 1875) was a merchant and politician in Nova Scotia, Canada. He represented Colchester County in the Nova Scotia House of Assembly from 1867 to 1871 as a Liberal member.

He was born in Newport, Nova Scotia, the son of Robert Chambers. He married Nancy Blair Archibald. Chambers was a justice of the peace. He died in Truro.
