= William McDougall (Nova Scotia politician) =

Canadian politician

William McDougall (January 16, 1816 – May 2, 1886) was a shipbuilder, ship owner and political figure in Nova Scotia, Canada. He represented Hants County in the Nova Scotia House of Assembly from 1871 to 1874 as a Liberal-Conservative member.

He was the son of Duncan McDougall. McDougall married Sarah O'Brien. He drowned at sea during a voyage between Philadelphia and Havre.

== See also ==
- A Directory of the Members of the Legislative Assembly of Nova Scotia, 1758-1958, Public Archives of Nova Scotia (1958)
