= Mather Byles DesBrisay =

Canadian politician (1828–1900)

Honorable Mather Byles DesBrisay Judge, C.C.

MLA for Lunenburg
- In office 1867–1878

Speaker of the Nova Scotia House of Assembly
- In office 1875–1876
- Preceded by: John Barnhill Dickie
- Succeeded by: Isaac N. Mack

Personal details
- Born: March 19, 1828 Chester, Nova Scotia
- Died: April 8, 1900 (aged 72) Bridgewater, Nova Scotia
- Resting place: Bridgewater, Nova Scotia
- Party: Liberal
- Spouse: Ada Adams Harley
- Children: Reverend William Almon DesBrisay, Dr. Charles Mosse DesBrisay, M.D.Sarah Eliza DesBrisay, Marie Woodward DesBrisay, Louisa Caroline DesBrisay, Emma Almon DesBrisay, Jessie DesBrisay
- Parent(s): Dr. Thomas Belcher DesBrisay M.D. and Lucretia Bourdette Woodward
- Occupation: Lawyer, Judge of County Court

Mather Byles DesBrisay (March 19, 1828 – April 8, 1900) was a Canadian lawyer, judge, politician, and historian in the Province of Nova Scotia whose collections form the DesBrisay Museum in Bridgewater, Nova Scotia.

A descendant of Captain Théophile de la Cour DesBrisay (1671–1761) whose Huguenot family fled religious persecution in France and settled in Dublin, Ireland before emigrating to Canada, Mather Byles DesBrisay was the great-great-grandson of Thomas DesBrisay, a Lieutenant-Governor of St. John's Island (now Prince Edward Island). He was born in Chester, Nova Scotia and was educated in Halifax and Dartmouth. Trained in law, in 1851 Mather DesBrisay was admitted to the Bar of Nova Scotia. He eventually set up a law practice in his native Chester but in 1865 made Bridgewater his home.

In 1867, DesBrisay entered provincial politics as part of the anti Confederation movement and in the Nova Scotia general election was voted to the Nova Scotia House of Assembly. Reelected in 1874, the following year he was named Speaker of the House of Assembly of Nova Scotia. After 1875 DesBrisay was out of politics and in 1876 he married Ada Adams Harley.

Mather DesBrisay served as a County Court judge for Lunenburg, Shelburne and Queens counties until 1897. An avid historian, in 1870 he published his book titled "History of the County of Lunenburg." It marked what became a major pursuit of documentation that saw a revised edition of his book published in 1895. Following his death in 1900, the town of Bridgewater acquired his vast collection of papers and artifacts and established the DesBrisay Museum as a public community history museum.

Mather and Ada DesBrisay are buried together in the Brookside Cemetery in Bridgewater.
