= James Cochran (merchant) =

Canadian politician

James Cochran (1802 – March 6, 1877) was an Irish-born merchant and political figure in Nova Scotia, Canada. The original spelling for his surname was Cocoran or Corcoran. He represented Halifax County in the Nova Scotia House of Assembly from 1867 to 1871.

He was born in Granard, County Longford, the son of Timothy Cocoran and Margaret Flood, and came to Halifax in 1825. He worked for the firm of Temple and Lewis Piers, ship's chandlers. Cochran later went into business on his own. In 1829, he married Catherine Walsh. He was a director of the People's Bank and the Acadia Fire Insurance Company. He also served as president of the Charitable Irish Society, which assisted poor people of Irish descent in Nova Scotia. In 1868, he was named minister without portfolio in the province's Executive Council. Cochran was named to Nova Scotia's Legislative Council in 1871. Cochran died in Halifax.
