= William Annand =

Premier of Nova Scotia from 1867 to 1875

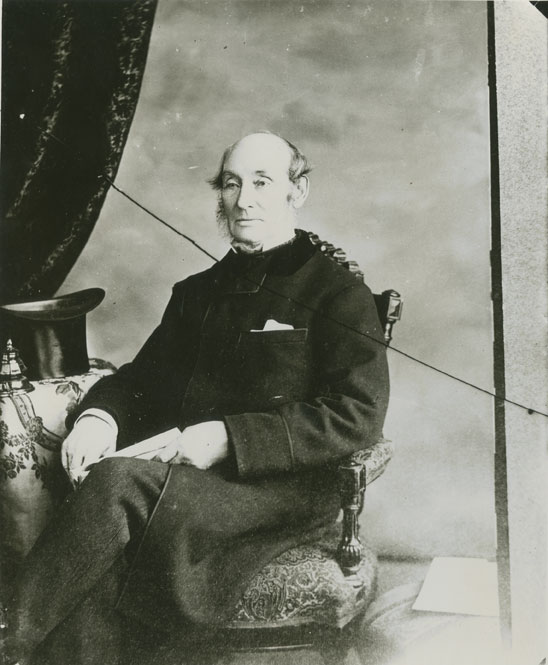

2nd Premier of Nova Scotia
- In office November 7, 1867 – May 8, 1875
- Monarch: Victoria
- Lieutenant Governor: Charles Hastings Doyle; Joseph Howe; Adams George Archibald
- Preceded by: Hiram Blanchard
- Succeeded by: Philip Carteret Hill

Member of the Nova Scotia House of Assembly
- In office 1851–1867
- In office 1836–1843

Member of Legislative Council
- In office September 18, 1867 – May 8, 1875

Personal details
- Born: April 10, 1808 Halifax, Nova Scotia, Canada
- Died: October 12, 1887 (aged 79) London, England, UK
- Citizenship: Canadian
- Party: Liberal
- Spouses: Emily Cuff (m. 1830) Martha Tupper (m. 1834)
- Children: 11 (6 sons and 5 daughters)
- Occupation: farmer, politician, publisher, and businessman

William Annand (April 10, 1808 – October 12, 1887) was a Nova Scotia publisher and politician. He was a member of the North British Society.

Annand was born in Halifax. He was educated in Scotland and returned to Nova Scotia in the 1820s with his brother with an intention to become a farmer. Annand was first elected to the Nova Scotia House of Assembly in 1836 and supported demands for responsible government. He lost his seat in 1843 and became proprietor and editor of the Novascotian and Morning Chronicle newspapers. In 1851 he returned to the House of Assembly as member for Halifax County. He was the financial secretary in Joseph Howe's ministry from 1860 to 1863 and in 1867 was appointed to the Legislative Council. In July 1866, Annand and Howe headed up a delegation to London in order to lobby against Nova Scotia's inclusion in confederation. He became the second premier of Nova Scotia November 7, 1867, on behalf of the Anti-Confederation Party which soon became the Nova Scotia Liberal Party, but he was a weak leader. Annand resigned May 8, 1875 and was replaced three days later by Philip Carteret Hill. Historian David A. Sutherland described him as a "mediocrity" who "possessed neither outstanding ability nor great depth of character."

Moving to London, he was appointed agent-general representing Canada until 1878 and then was appointed agent general on behalf of the Nova Scotia government serving in that position until the end of his life. He died in London in 1887.

His character was in the television drama "The Night They Killed Joe Howe" (1960), starring Douglas Rain, Austin Willis (as William Annand) and James Doohan, was located in Maitland, Nova Scotia.
