= Josiah Hooper =

Canadian politician (1807–1878)

Josiah Hooper (April 14, 1807 – April 24, 1878) was an English-born merchant, shipbuilder and political figure in Nova Scotia, Canada. He represented Richmond County from 1867 to 1871 in the Nova Scotia House of Assembly.

He was born in Bristol. Hooper married Elizabeth Hart. He was a justice of the peace. He lived in Arichat, Nova Scotia. Hooper died in Halifax at the age of 71.
