= Edward L. Brown =

Canadian politician (1805–1876)

Edward Lothrop Brown (September 7, 1805 – February 9, 1876) was a medical doctor and political figure. He represented Horton township from 1847 to 1859 and Kings from 1863 to 1871 in the Nova Scotia House of Assembly.

He was born in Horton, Nova Scotia, the son of Charles Brown and Frances Lothrop. He was educated in Pennsylvania, receiving a M.D. in 1829. He died in Horton at the age of 70.

His brother John L. Brown also served in the provincial assembly.
