= Henry Yeomans =

Canadian politician

Henry Yeomans (February 17, 1805 – August 10, 1878) was a farmer and political figure in Nova Scotia, Canada. He represented Hants County in the Nova Scotia House of Assembly in 1874 as a Liberal member.

He was born in Halifax, the son of Henry Yeomans. Yeomans was elected to the provincial assembly in an 1874 by-election held after William McDougall resigned his seat. He lived in Shubenacadie.
