= William Garvie =

Canadian politician (1837–1872)

William Garvie (1837 – December 15, 1872) was a lawyer, journalist, and political figure in Nova Scotia, Canada. He represented Halifax County in the Nova Scotia House of Assembly as a Liberal from 1871 to 1872.

== Early life ==
He was born in the West Indies, the son of John Garvie, of Scottish descent, and came to Halifax with his parents.

== Career ==
In 1863, with Edmund Mortimer McDonald, he founded the Halifax Citizen, a newspaper opposed to Confederation. In 1866, Garvie retired from the paper, studied law at Lincoln's Inn and was called to the bar there in 1869. In 1870, he returned to Nova Scotia, setting up practice in Halifax. The following year, he was named Commissioner of Public Works and Mines within the Executive Council of Nova Scotia.

In the early 1870s, Harvie, a member of the Nova Scotian Institute of Science, actively advocated for the Nova Scotia Museum and its curator, David Honeyman, at the Nova Scotia House of Assembly.

== Death ==
Suffering from tuberculosis, he was only able to appear once in the provincial assembly, speaking in support of the government. William Garvie died on December 15, 1872, in Hyères in the south of France while attempting to recover from the disease.
