= Edward Vickery =

Canadian politician

Edward Vickery (September 21, 1823 – February 3, 1883) was a merchant, ship builder and political figure in Nova Scotia, Canada. He represented Cumberland County in the Nova Scotia House of Assembly as a Conservative member from 1871 to 1874 and 1875 to 1882.

He was born in Parrsboro, Nova Scotia, the son of James Vickery and Mary Tate, and the grandson of Johnathan Vickery, a United Empire Loyalist. Vickery was educated at Horton. In 1869, he married Matilda Church. Vickery served as a school commissioner. He ran unsuccessfully for a seat in the provincial assembly in 1867. After being defeated by Amos Purdy in the 1874 general election, Vickery was declared elected by the assembly in 1875 after Purdy resigned his seat. Although a Conservative, Vickery supported the Liberal railway policy. He died in Parrsboro at the age of 59.
