= David M. Dickie =

Canadian politician

David Matthew Dickie (born September 5, 1829) was a merchant, ship owner and political figure in Nova Scotia, Canada. He represented Kings County in the Nova Scotia House of Assembly from 1867 to 1871 as a Liberal member.

He was born in Cornwallis, Nova Scotia, the son of Charles Dickie, formerly a member of the Legislative Council, and Sarah Tupper. In 1853, Dickie married Kate Howe Fellows. He later served as registrar of deeds.
