= William Kidston (Canadian politician) =

Canadian politician

William Kidston (February 11, 1816 – 1882) was a merchant and political figure in Nova Scotia, Canada. He represented Victoria County in the Nova Scotia House of Assembly from 1867 to 1871 as a Liberal member.

He was born in Halifax, the son of William Kidston, a Glasgow merchant, and Elizabeth Dawson, and was educated in Glasgow. His sister Eliza (1823–60) married the Rev James Law, and was the mother of the British prime minister Bonar Law. In 1836, he married Margaret Ann, the widow of Lieutenant James Duffus. Kidston was a major in the local militia, treasurer for Victoria County and custos rotulorum for the county. He also served as justice of the peace. Kidston lived in Baddeck. He ran unsuccessfully for reelection to the provincial assembly in 1874.
