= William H. Townsend =

Canadian politician (1812–1873)

William Townsend

MLA for Yarmouth County
- In office 1867–1872
- Preceded by: District created
- Succeeded by: John K. Ryerson

MLA for Yarmouth township
- In office 1859–1863

Personal details
- Born: 1812 New York City, New York
- Died: October 14, 1873 (aged 60–61) Yarmouth, Nova Scotia
- Party: Conservative (1859-1863) Liberal (1866-1872)
- Spouse: Sarah Gardner
- Occupation: Merchant

William H. Townsend (1812 – October 14, 1873) was a merchant and political figure in Nova Scotia, Canada. He represented Yarmouth County in the Nova Scotia House of Assembly from 1859 to 1863 as a Conservative and from 1866 to 1872 as a Liberal member.

== Early life ==
He was born in New York City, the son of William Townsend, and ran away from home to Yarmouth, Nova Scotia at the age of 16.

== Before politics ==
Townsend opened a chandlery and hardware business in Yarmouth. He was involved with a number of insurance companies as shareholder or director. Townsend also was a director of the Yarmouth Steam Navigation Company and president of the Bank of Yarmouth and then the Exchange Bank of Yarmouth. He married Sarah Gardner. Townsend was warden for Yarmouth County in 1857.

== Political career ==
He was first elected to the provincial assembly as a Conservative but opposed Confederation. Townsend resigned his seat in the provincial assembly in 1872 due to poor health and died in Yarmouth the following year.
