= Elkanah Young =

Canadian merchant and politician

Elkanah Young (c. 1800 – April 13, 1876) was a merchant and political figure in Nova Scotia, Canada. He represented Falmouth township from 1843 to 1847 and from 1851 to 1855 and Hants County from 1867 to 1871 as a Liberal-Conservative member in the Nova Scotia House of Assembly.

He was born in Falmouth, Nova Scotia, the son of William Young. Young married Charlotte Spurr. He was director for the Avon Marine Insurance Company. He died at the age of 72 in Falmouth.
