= William Henry Wylde (politician) =

Canadian politician

William Henry Wylde (February 7, 1817 – 1895) was a merchant and political figure in Nova Scotia, Canada. He represented Guysborough County in the Nova Scotia House of Assembly from 1870 to 1875 as a Liberal member.

He was born in Halifax, the son of Isaac Wylde. Wylde married Martha Caroline Simpson. He was a public school trustee. Wylde resigned his seat in 1875.
