= Henry Gesner Pineo Jr. =

Canadian politician

Henry Gesner Pineo Jr. (March 6, 1830 – May 12, 1874) was a political figure in Nova Scotia, Canada. He represented Cumberland County in the Nova Scotia House of Assembly from 1867 to 1874 as a Conservative member.

He was born in Pugwash, Nova Scotia, the son of Henry Gesner Pineo, a member of the province's Legislative Council. Pineo was educated in Sackville. In 1851, he married Charlotte Amelia Kerr. He served as consular agent for the United States and vice consul for Sweden and Norway before Confederation. Pineo was also lieutenant-colonel in the militia. He died in Pugwash at the age of 44.
