= Alexander Campbell (Nova Scotia politician) =

Canadian politician

Alexander Campbell (May 22, 1826 – September 2, 1909) was a Scottish-born notary public and political figure in Nova Scotia, Canada. He represented Inverness County in the Nova Scotia House of Assembly from 1867 to 1871 and from 1878 to 1886 as a Liberal-Conservative member.

He was born on the Isle of Skye, the son of Archibald Campbell and Margaret MacLean, and came to Cape Breton in 1830. In 1853, Campbell married Mary McLean. He married Ella G. Grant after the death of his first wife. Campbell was also a magistrate for Inverness County and was a senior major in the militia. He was elected in 1867 on an anti-Confederation platform. Campbell died at Strathlorne at the age of 83.

His former home has been designed a provincial heritage property.
