= Samuel Rettie =

Canadian politician

Member of the Legislative Assembly of Nova Scotia for Colchester
- In office 1871–1874

Personal details
- Born: January 23, 1818 Pictou, Nova Scotia, Canada
- Died: January 20, 1883 (aged 64) Truro, Nova Scotia, Canada
- Party: Liberal-Conservative
- Spouse: Christine Gallie (m. 1859)
- Occupation: merchant, shipbuilder, politician

Samuel Rettie (January 23, 1818 – January 20, 1883) was a merchant, shipbuilder and political figure in Nova Scotia, Canada. In 1867, he spoke in favour of Canadian Confederation. He represented Colchester County from 1871 to 1874 in the Nova Scotia House of Assembly as a Liberal-Conservative member.

He was born in Pictou, Nova Scotia, the son of John Rettie and Christine Gallie. In 1859, he married Elmira Cox. Rettie was a justice of the peace. He died in Truro at the age of 64.

Samuel Rettie is the Great-Great Uncle of Senator Jim Cowan.
