= John K. Ryerson =

Canadian politician (1820–1890)

John Ryerson

MLA for Yarmouth County
- In office 1872–1874
- Preceded by: William H. Townsend
- Succeeded by: John Lovitt

Personal details
- Born: July 16, 1820 Annapolis Royal, Nova Scotia
- Died: December 17, 1890 (aged 70)
- Party: Liberal
- Spouse: Abby Shaw
- Occupation: Merchant

John K. Ryerson (July 16, 1820 – December 17, 1890) was a merchant and political figure in Nova Scotia, Canada. He represented Yarmouth County in the Nova Scotia House of Assembly from 1867 to 1871 and from 1872 to 1874 as a Liberal member.

He was born in Annapolis Royal, Nova Scotia, the son of Stephen D. Ryerson, and was educated there and in Yarmouth. He went to sea at the age of seventeen, later becoming a ship owner. In 1843, he married Abby Shaw. With his business partner Nathan Moses of Yarmouth, Ryerson was involved in trade with the West Indies. He was also a member of the board of governors for Yarmouth Seminary and a director of the Atlantic Marine Insurance Company. Ryerson served as a captain in the Yarmouth Naval Brigade and was also a justice of the peace. He ran unsuccessfully for reelection in 1871 but was elected again in an 1872 by-election held after William H. Townsend resigned his seat due to poor health.
