= Jared C. Troop =

Canadian politician

Jared Chipman Troop

MLA for Annapolis County
- In office 1867–1874

Speaker of the Nova Scotia House of Assembly
- In office 1870–1874
- Preceded by: John Joseph Marshall
- Succeeded by: John Barnhill Dickie

Personal details
- Born: ca 1837 Bridgetown, Nova Scotia
- Died: 27 July 1876 (aged 38–39) Bridgetown, Nova Scotia
- Party: Reformer, Anti-Confederate
- Occupation: lawyer

Jared Chipman Troop (ca 1837 – 27 July 1876) was a lawyer and political figure in Nova Scotia, Canada. He represented Annapolis County in the Nova Scotia House of Assembly from 1867 to 1874.

Troop was born in Bridgetown, Nova Scotia in 1837 or 1838, the son of Alexander H. Troop and Eunice Chipman. Troop was called to the bar in 1856. He was part of a delegation sent to England in 1868 to attempt to have the Union with Canada repealed. He served as a minister without portfolio from 1867 to 1870, when he was named speaker for the assembly after the death of John Joseph Marshall. Troop was reelected speaker in 1871. He served as custos rotulorum for Annapolis County from 1868 to 1876. He lived in Bridgetown until his death in 1876.
