= Alonzo J. White =

Canadian politician

Alonzo J. White (c. 1836 – August 29, 1912) was a lawyer and political figure in Nova Scotia, Canada. He represented Cape Breton County in the Nova Scotia House of Assembly from 1867 to 1878 and from 1882 to 1886 as a Liberal member.

He was born in St. John's, Newfoundland, the son of L. J. White, and came to Halifax while still young. He was educated at Dalhousie College. In 1876, he was named Queen's Counsel. White served on the province's Executive Council as Commissioner of Crown Lands from 1874 to 1877 and Attorney General from 1877 to 1878 and from 1882 to 1886. He was defeated when he ran for reelection in 1878. White was registrar of deeds at Halifax from 1892 to 1912. He died in Halifax.
