= John Fergusson (politician) =

Canadian politician (1815–1891)

John Fergusson (May 6, 1815 – March, 1891) was a Scottish-born political figure in Nova Scotia. He represented Cape Breton County in the Nova Scotia House of Assembly from 1867 to 1874 as a Liberal member.

He was born in Baleshare on North Uist in the Hebrides, the son of Donald Fergusson, and was educated there and at Glasgow. In 1848, he married Eliza Thompson. Fergusson was a captain in the militia, a school commissioner and a member of the Board of Health. He served as a minister without portfolio in the province's Executive Council from 1867 to 1874. Fergusson was named sheriff for Cape Breton County in 1875. He died in Sydney at the age of 75.
