= Daniel McDonald (Nova Scotia politician) =

Canadian politician (1828–1911)

Daniel McDonald (December 22, 1828– July 13, 1911) was a lawyer and political figure in Nova Scotia, Canada. He represented Antigonish County in the Nova Scotia House of Assembly from 1867 to 1878 as a Liberal member.

He was born in Arisaig, Nova Scotia, the son of Dr. Alexander McDonald, of Scottish descent, and Charlotte Harrington. McDonald was called to the Nova Scotia bar in 1852. In 1874, he married Annie McDonald. He served in the province's Executive Council as Chief Commissioner of Public Works and Mines from 1872 to 1875 and then as Attorney General in 1875. McDonald served as a member of the province's Legislative Council from 1894 to 1896. He died in Antigonish at the age of 82.
