= David C. Landers =

Canadian politician

MLA for Annapolis County
- In office 1867–1874

Personal details
- Born: September 11, 1801 Yarmouth, Nova Scotia
- Died: June 5, 1890 (aged 88) Middleton, Nova Scotia
- Party: Liberal Party of Nova Scotia
- Spouse: Mary Upham Slocumb

David C. Landers (September 11, 1801 – June 5, 1890) was a political figure in Nova Scotia, Canada. He represented Annapolis County in the Nova Scotia House of Assembly from 1867 to 1874 as a Liberal member.

He was born in Yarmouth, Nova Scotia, the son of Isaac Landers and Mehitable Corning. In 1832, he married Mary Upham Slocumb. He was a justice of the peace. Landers lived in Nictaux, Nova Scotia. He died in 1890.
