= James Daniel Eisenhauer =

Canadian politician

Member of Parliament for Lunenburg
- In office 1887–1891
- Preceded by: Charles Edwin Kaulbach
- Succeeded by: Charles Edwin Kaulbach

Personal details
- Born: January 1, 1832 Lunenburg, Nova Scotia
- Died: November 16, 1896 (aged 64) Lunenburg, Nova Scotia, Canada
- Party: Liberal

James Daniel Eisenhauer (January 1, 1832 – November 16, 1896) was a merchant and political figure in Nova Scotia, Canada. He represented Lunenburg in the House of Commons of Canada from 1887 to 1891 as a Liberal member.

== Early life and education ==
He was born in Lunenburg, Nova Scotia, the son of German immigrants, and was educated there.

== Career ==
Eisenhauer was a major exporter of fish to the West Indies. He was president of the Lunenburg Marine Association and treasurer for the Nova Scotia Wood Pulp and Paper Company. Eisenhauer represented Lunenburg County in the Nova Scotia House of Assembly from 1867 to 1878; he was defeated when he ran for reelection in 1878. After serving one term in the House of Commons, Eisenhauer was unsuccessful in the 1891 general election.

== Personal life ==
In 1859, he married Mary Ann Begg.

== Electoral record ==
1887 Canadian federal election: Lunenburg
Party	Candidate	Votes
Liberal	James Daniel Eisenhauer	2,430
Conservative	Charles Edwin Kaulbach	2,308

1891 Canadian federal election: Lunenburg
Party	Candidate	Votes
Conservative	Charles Edwin Kaulbach	2,592
Liberal	James Daniel Eisenhauer	2,402
