= Amos Purdy =

Canadian politician

Amos Joseph Griffin Purdy (September 4 or 5, 1825 – September 1904) was a merchant and political figure in Nova Scotia, Canada. He represented Cumberland County in the Nova Scotia House of Assembly from 1867 to 1871 and in 1874 as a Liberal member.

He was born in Westchester, Cumberland County, Nova Scotia, the son of David Purdy and Mary Griffin, and the grandson of Gabriel Purdy, a United Empire Loyalist. He was educated at the Sackville Academy. In 1855 or 1856, he married Elizabeth A. Atkinson / Aitkenson (1832–1892) with whom he had nine children. Purdy served as census commissioner for the province in 1870. He was elected to the provincial assembly a second time in 1874 but resigned his seat in March 1875.
