= John Ross (Nova Scotia politician) =

Canadian politician

John Ross (December 27, 1820 – 1892) was a political figure in Nova Scotia, Canada. He represented Victoria County in the Nova Scotia House of Assembly from 1867 to 1874 as a Liberal member. He was preceded in the Assembly by his brother, William Ross, who represented Victoria County from 1857 to 1867. At Confederation in 1867 his brother William Ross was elected to represent Victoria County in the House of Commons at Ottawa.

John Ross was born at Churchville, Pictou County, Nova Scotia, the son of John Ross. In 1863, he married Christina Isabell McKay. He lived at Little Bras d'Or in Cape Breton County, Nova Scotia. He moved to New Glasgow, Nova Scotia in 1876.
