= Joseph MacDonald (Antigonish politician) =

Canadian politician

Joseph MacDonald (born July 1824) was a political figure in Nova Scotia, Canada. He represented Antigonish County in the Nova Scotia House of Assembly from 1867 to 1874 as a Liberal member.

He was born in Antigonish, Nova Scotia and educated there. In 1867, he married Emily McDonald. MacDonald was defeated when he ran for reelection in 1874.
