= Robert Robertson (Nova Scotia politician) =

Canadian politician (1817–1901)

Robert Robertson (March 31, 1817 – August 21, 1901) was a political figure in Nova Scotia, Canada. He represented Barrington township from 1855 to 1867 and Shelburne County from 1867 to 1877 in the Nova Scotia House of Assembly as a Liberal member.

He was born in Barrington, Nova Scotia, the son of William Robertson, a United Empire Loyalist, and Sarah Van Norden. He married Sarah Richan. Robertson was Minister of Public Works and Mines from 1867 to 1871 and from 1875 to 1877 in the province's Executive Council; from 1871 to 1875, he was a minister without portfolio. He died at Barrington Head.

His son Thomas served in the Nova Scotia assembly and the Canadian House of Commons.
