= John Angus Kirk =

Canadian politician (1837–1910)

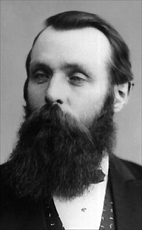

Member of Parliament for Guysborough
- In office 1874–1878
- Preceded by: Stewart Campbell
- Succeeded by: Alfred Ogden
- In office 1882–1891
- Preceded by: Alfred Ogden
- Succeeded by: Duncan Cameron Fraser

Personal details
- Born: March 1, 1837 Glenelg, Nova Scotia, Canada
- Died: September 13, 1910 (aged 73) Goshen, Nova Scotia, Canada
- Party: Liberal
- Profession: farmer

John Angus Kirk (March 1, 1837 – September 13, 1910) was a Canadian politician and farmer. He was elected to the House of Commons of Canada as a Member of the Liberal Party to represent the riding of Guysborough. He was defeated in 1878 and re-elected in 1882 and 1887.

He was the son of Angus Kirk, of Scottish descent. He was educated in Glenelg and at Saint Francis Xavier University and became a farmer in Guysborough County. Kirk was a councillor for St. Mary's, Nova Scotia and a member of the Canadian military as a Lieutenant-Colonel in the 5th Guysborough Regiment of Militia. He represented Guysborough County in the Nova Scotia House of Assembly from 1867 to 1874, when he resigned his seat to run for a seat in the House of Commons.

He was married twice: to Sarah Susannah McLean in 1864 and later married a Miss Henry.

== Electoral record ==
1874 Canadian federal election: Guysborough
Party	Candidate	Votes
Liberal	John Angus Kirk	759
Liberal–Conservative	Stewart Campbell	544
lop.parl.ca

1878 Canadian federal election: Guysborough
Party	Candidate	Votes
Conservative	Alfred Ogden	936
Liberal	John Angus Kirk	772

1882 Canadian federal election: Guysborough
Party	Candidate	Votes
Liberal	John Angus Kirk	818
Conservative	Alfred Ogden	628

1887 Canadian federal election: Guysborough
Party	Candidate	Votes
Liberal	John Angus Kirk	1,136
Conservative	Alex. F. Falconer	784
