= William Henry Smith (Canadian politician) =

Canadian politician

Member of the Nova Scotia House of Assembly for Queens County
- In office 1867–1874

Personal details
- Born: c. 1826; Saint Kitts, West Indies
- Died: February 1, 1890 (aged 63–64); Halifax, Nova Scotia, Canada
- Political party: Conservative
- Spouse: Mary A.E. Poyntz

William Henry Smith, QC (c. 1826 – February 1, 1890) was a lawyer and political figure in Nova Scotia, Canada. He represented Queen's County in the Nova Scotia House of Assembly from 1867 to 1874 as a Conservative member.

== Background ==
He was born on Saint Kitts in the West Indies, the son of James Boyer Smith, who served in the house of assembly for the island. Smith came to Nova Scotia with his family in 1833. In 1849, he was called to the Nova Scotia bar. He married Mary A.E. Poyntz in 1854. He went to England in 1868 with others from the province to request a repeal of Confederation. In 1872, Smith was named Queen's Counsel. He served as probate judge for Shelburne County and registrar of probates for Queen's County. Smith also served as attorney general for the Executive Council of Nova Scotia. He died in Halifax.
