= Thomas Fletcher Morrison =

Canadian politician

Thomas Fletcher Morrison (February 22, 1808 – July 23, 1886) was a sailor, farmer and political figure in Nova Scotia, Canada. He represented Londonderry Township from 1855 to 1859 and Colchester County from 1859 to 1863 and from 1867 to 1874 as a Liberal in the Nova Scotia House of Assembly.

He was born in Londonderry, Nova Scotia, the son of Joseph A. Morrison and Isabella Fletcher, of Irish descent. In 1838, he married Hannah Faulkner. He married Margaret Brown Fletcher in 1844 after the death of his first wife. Morrison opposed Confederation. He sponsored the bill which brought the secret ballot to the province. In 1876, he was named to the province's Legislative Council. He died at Folly Village in Colchester County at the age of 78.

His grandfather John Morrison had earlier served in the assembly.
