= Samuel Freeman (Canadian politician) =

Canadian politician

Samuel Freeman (April 2, 1824 – April 1, 1902) was a merchant and political figure in Nova Scotia, Canada. He represented Queens County in the Nova Scotia House of Assembly from 1867 to 1878 as a Liberal member.

He was born in Liverpool, Nova Scotia, the son of Samuel Freeman and Sophia Ford. In 1849, he married Charlotte Freeman. He was the founder of Samuel Freeman and Sons, which was involved in lumbering, shipbuilding and the sale of groceries. He died in Milton at the age of 78.
