= John Flinn (politician) =

Canadian politician

John Flinn (1842 – December 24, 1906) was a merchant, contractor and political figure in Nova Scotia, Canada. He represented Halifax County in the Nova Scotia House of Assembly from 1871 to 1874 as a Liberal member.

He was born in Halifax, the son of Richard Flinn, an Irish immigrant. Flinn married Ellen Hogan. He served as warden for Melville Island prison near Halifax beginning in 1875. His wife took on the duties of prison matron. After suffering an injury trying to prevent some prisoners from escaping, Flinn was partially paralysed and required the use of a wheelchair.
