= Hartshorne (surname) =

Hartshorne is a surname. Notable people with the surname include:

- Anna Cope Hartshorne (1860–1957), American educator in Japan
- Arthur Hartshorne (1880–1915), American ice dancer
- Charles Hartshorne (1897–2000), American philosopher
- Charles Henry Hartshorne (1802–1865), English cleric and antiquary
- Edward Y. Hartshorne (1912–1946), American education officer
- Joshua Hartshorne (1808–1884), American politician from Pennsylvania
- Lawrence Hartshorne (1755–1822), merchant and political figure in Nova Scotia
- Lawrence Hartshorne, Jr. (1786–1865), hardware merchant and political figure in Nova Scotia
- Richard Hartshorne (1899–1992), American geographer
- Richard Hartshorne (settler) (1641–1722), early settler in New Jersey
- Richard Hartshorne (judge) (1888–1975), United States federal judge
- Robin Hartshorne (born 1938), American mathematician
- Sarah Hartshorne, contestant of America's Next Top Model, Cycle 9
