= Jonathan Binney =

Canadian politician

Member of the 1st to 3rd Nova Scotia House of Assembly
- In office 1758–1765

Personal details
- Born: January 7, 1723 or 1724 Hull, Massachusetts
- Died: October 8, 1807 Halifax, Nova Scotia

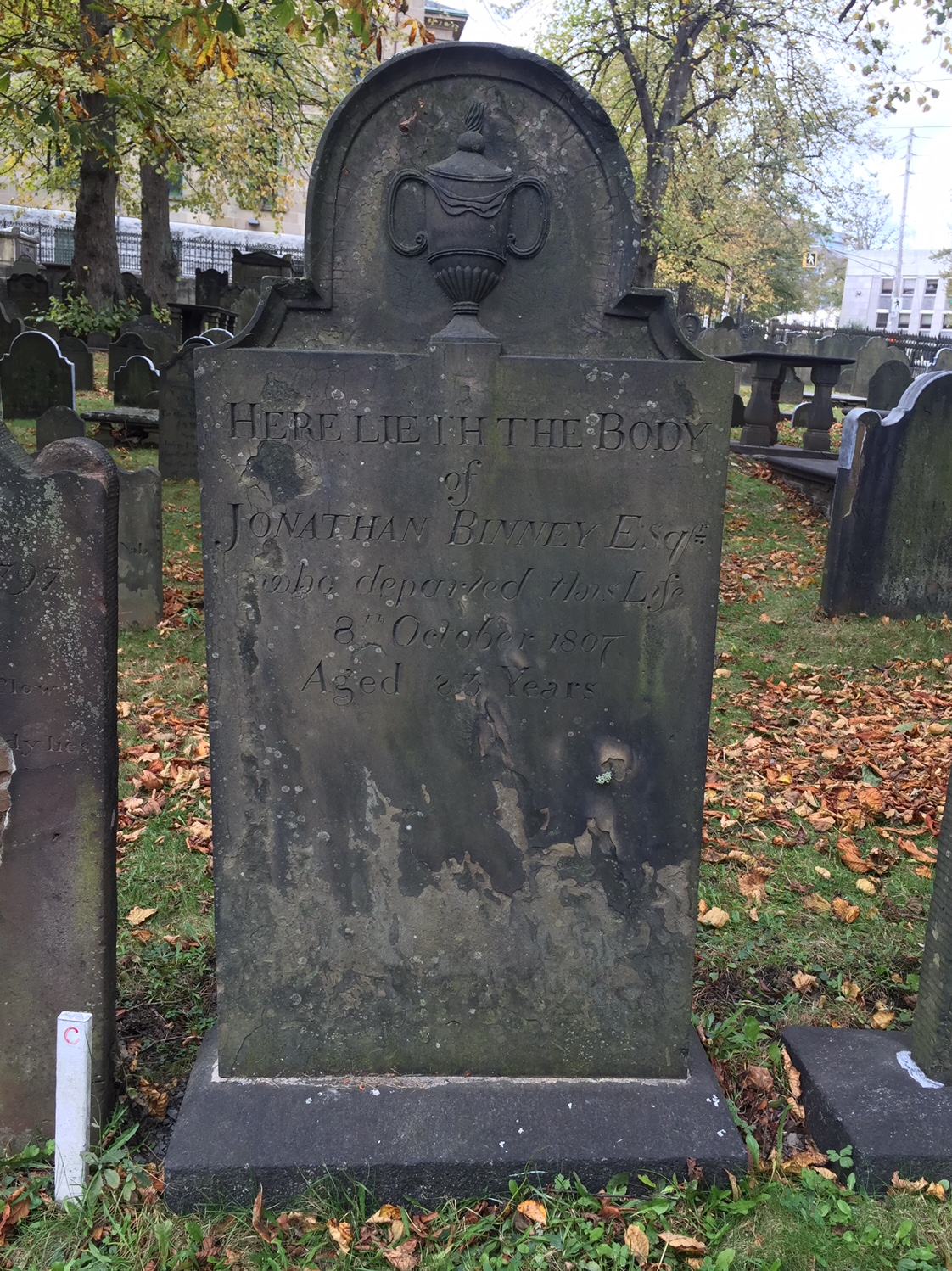
Jonathan Binney, Old Burying Ground, Halifax, Nova Scotia

Jonathan Binney (January 7, 1723/24 – October 8, 1807) was a merchant, judge and political figure in Nova Scotia. He was a member of the 1st to 3rd Nova Scotia House of Assemblies from 1758 to 1765. He arrived in Nova Scotia in 1753. His father-in-law was Henry Newton. Binney was buried, along with his two sons Stephen and Hibbert, in the Old Burying Ground in Halifax, Nova Scotia.

He was born in Hull, Massachusetts, the son of Thomas Binney and Margaret Miller, and went into business in Boston. Binney married Martha Hall in 1746 and they had a son, Stephen. Martha died and Jonathan moved to Halifax, leaving his only child in Boston. There, he married Hannah Adams Newton; they had another son, Stephen Hall Binney. Two days later, Jonathan's first son died in Boston at age 11 and was buried at King's Chapel.

Jonathan Binney and Joseph Frederick Wallet DesBarres met the Mi'kmaw chiefs at Arichat, Nova Scotia, in 1761, and concluded a lasting peace.

Binney was named to the province's Council in 1764. In the same year, he was appointed collector of provincial duties and magistrate at Canso. In 1768, he became customs collector and judge for St. John's Island (later Prince Edward Island). He was named judge in the Inferior Court of Common Pleas for Halifax County in 1772. When Francis Legge became lieutenant governor, he had Binney and his family arrested because Binney often paid himself first with the funds collected on behalf of the government. Binney successfully brought his case against Legge before the Board of Trade in London and his debts were forgiven by the Nova Scotia assembly. In 1784, Binney was accused of certifying New England fishermen as Nova Scotians so he could sell them fishing licenses. He died in Halifax, leaving his belongings to his two surviving sons, Hibbert and Stephen.

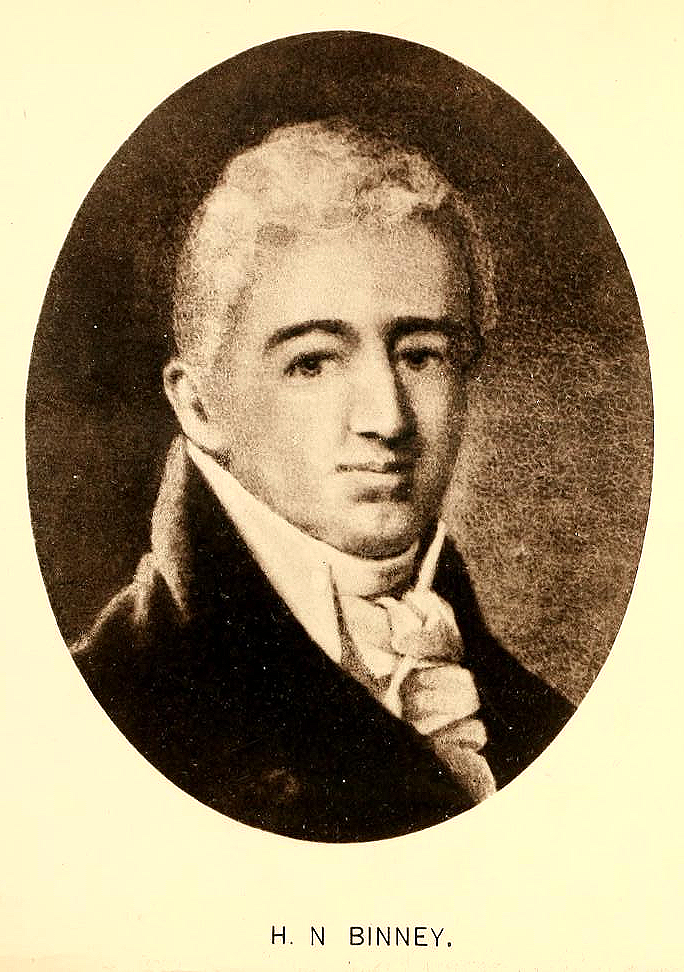
Jonathan's son Hibbert Newton Binney, buried in the Old Burying Ground, Halifax

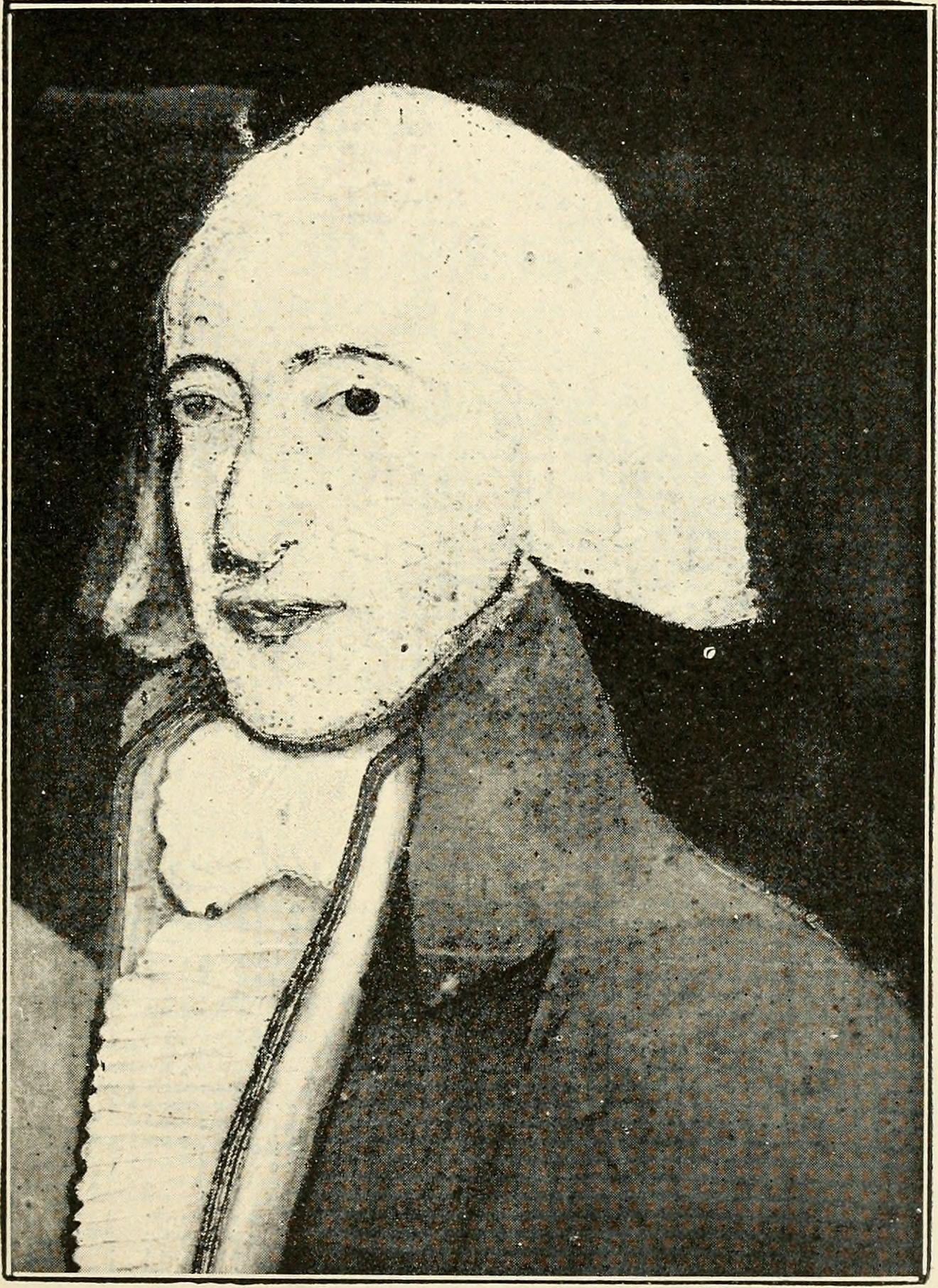
Jonathan Binney's son Stephen Hall Binney (1760–1836) is buried in the Old Burying Ground, Halifax
