= Dight =

Dight is an English surname, meaning 'to equip'. It is an occupational surname for the servant who dressed a knight before a battle or tournament.

Notable people with the surname include:

- Charles Dight (Australian businessman)
- Charles Fremont Dight (1856–1938), American academic and eugenicist
- John Butler Dight (c. 1760 – 1854), Canadian politician

== See also ==
- Dights Falls, Melbourne, Victoria, Australia
