= Hibbert Newton Binney =

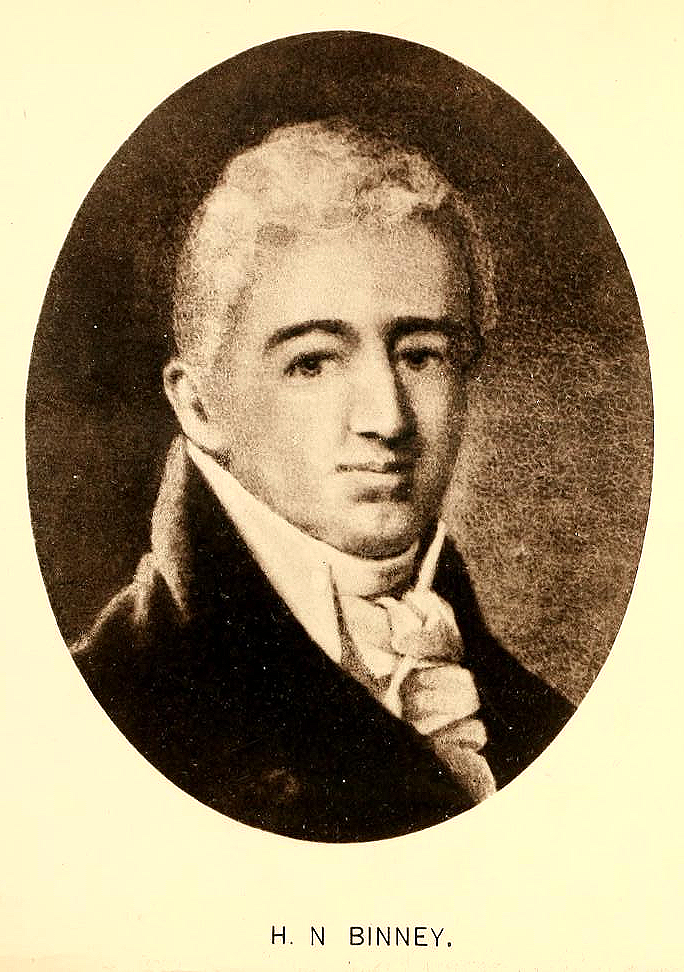
Hibbert Newton Binney

Hibbert Newton Binney (1766–1842) was a soldier in the Royal Nova Scotia Volunteer Regiment in the American Revolution. He became a member of the Nova Scotia Council. He was also a painter who created some of the earliest images of the Mi'kmaq people. He was the grandson of Henry Newton and the son of Jonathan Binney who was a signatory to one of the Halifax Treaties with the Mi'kmaq. Hibbert is buried in the Old Burying Ground (Halifax, Nova Scotia). There is a mural tablet at St. Paul's Church (Halifax) to his son commander Lieut. John Binney and 11 crew of the mail packet brig Star, that all died at sea. His grandfathers were Henry Newton (politician) and Bishop Hibbert Binney. He was also the son-in-law of John Creighton (judge).

== Gallery ==
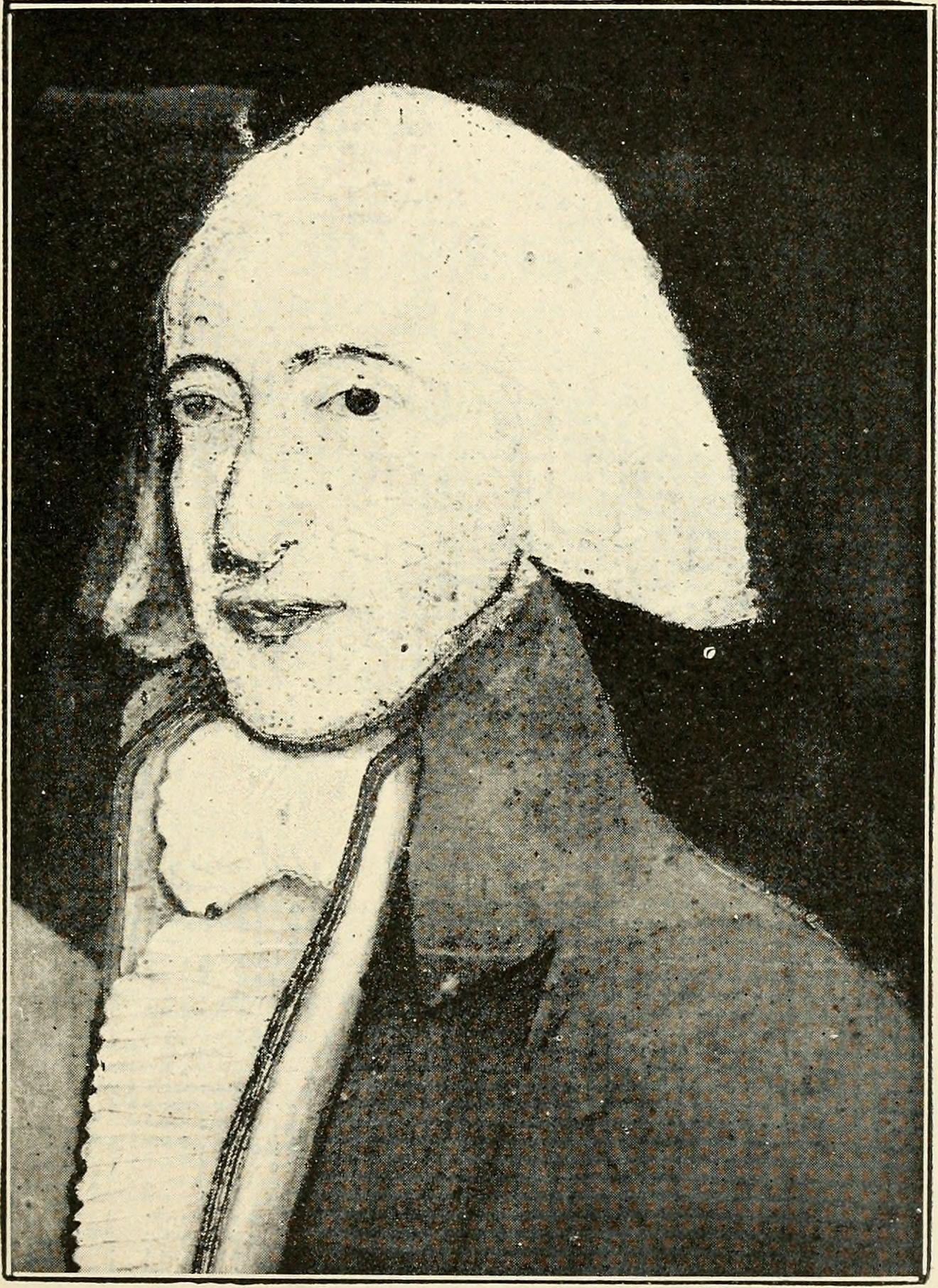
Hibbert Binney's painting of his brother Stephen Hall Binney (1791, age 31)

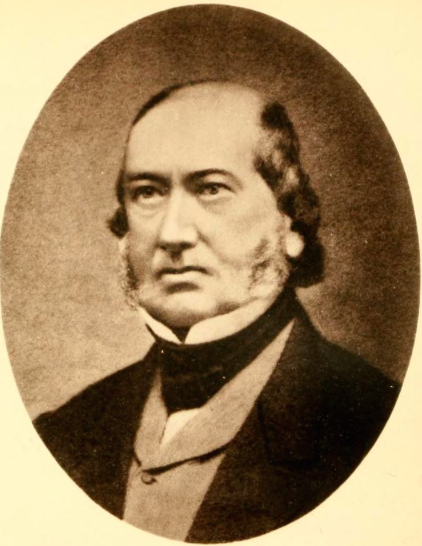
Stephen Hall Binney, c.1821, age 61

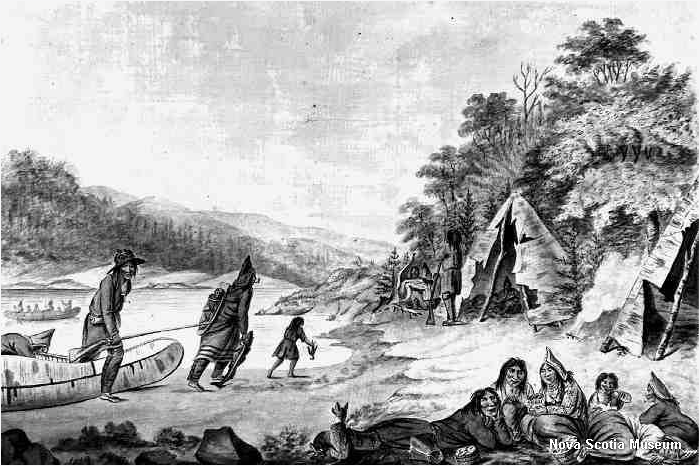
Mi'kmaw Encampment by Hibbert Binney, c.1791

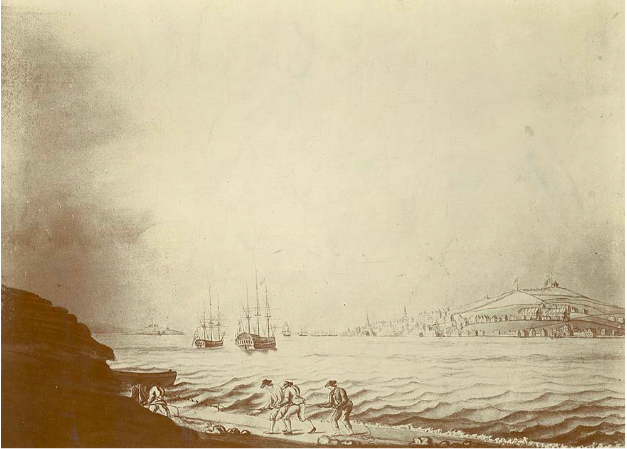
"A View of the Town of Halifax from the Dartmouth Shore" (1791)

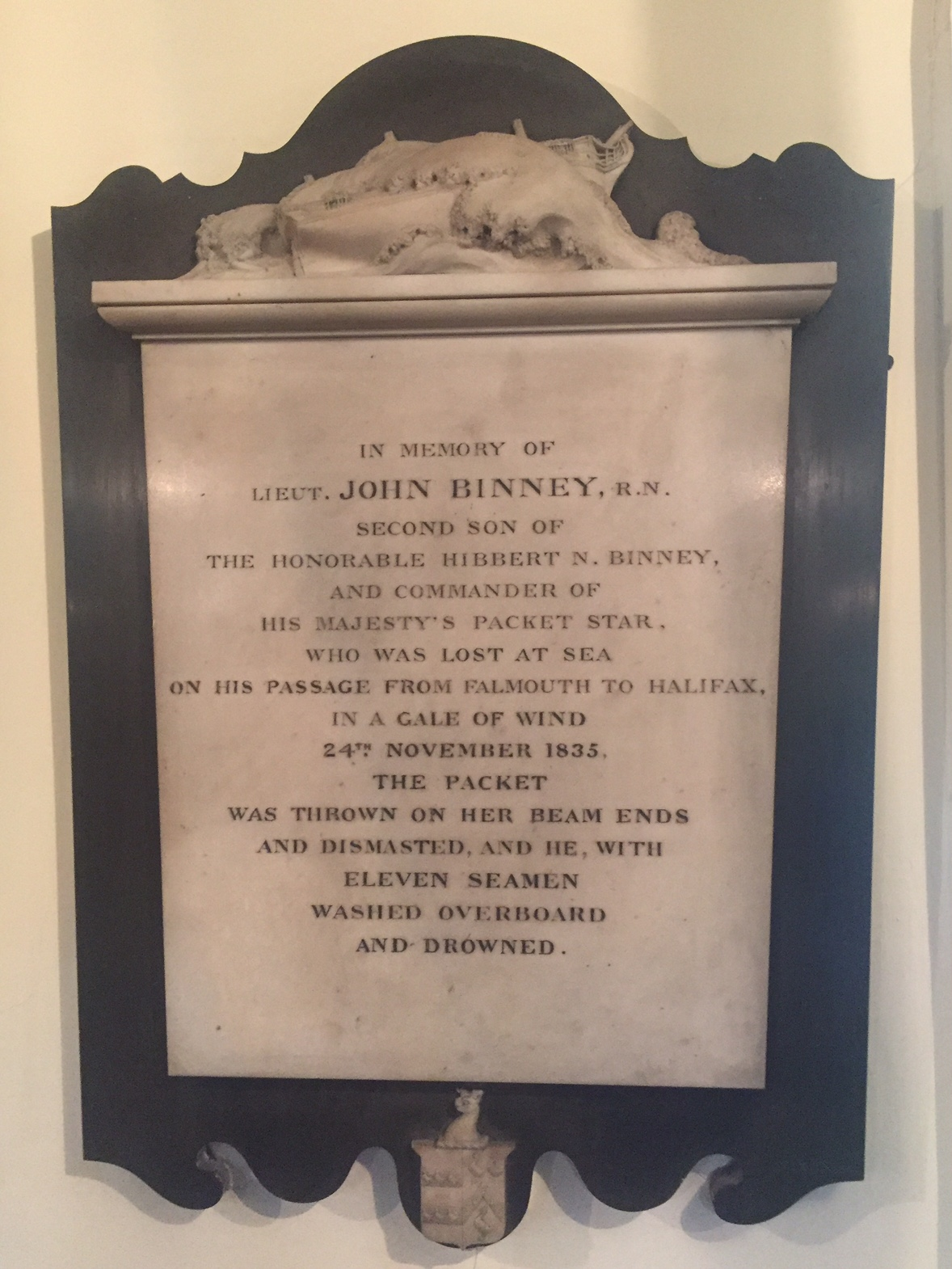
Plaque to Hibbert Newton Binney's son John Binney who died at sea along with 11 crew (1835) by Samuel Nixon (sculptor), St. Paul's Church (Halifax), Nova Scotia

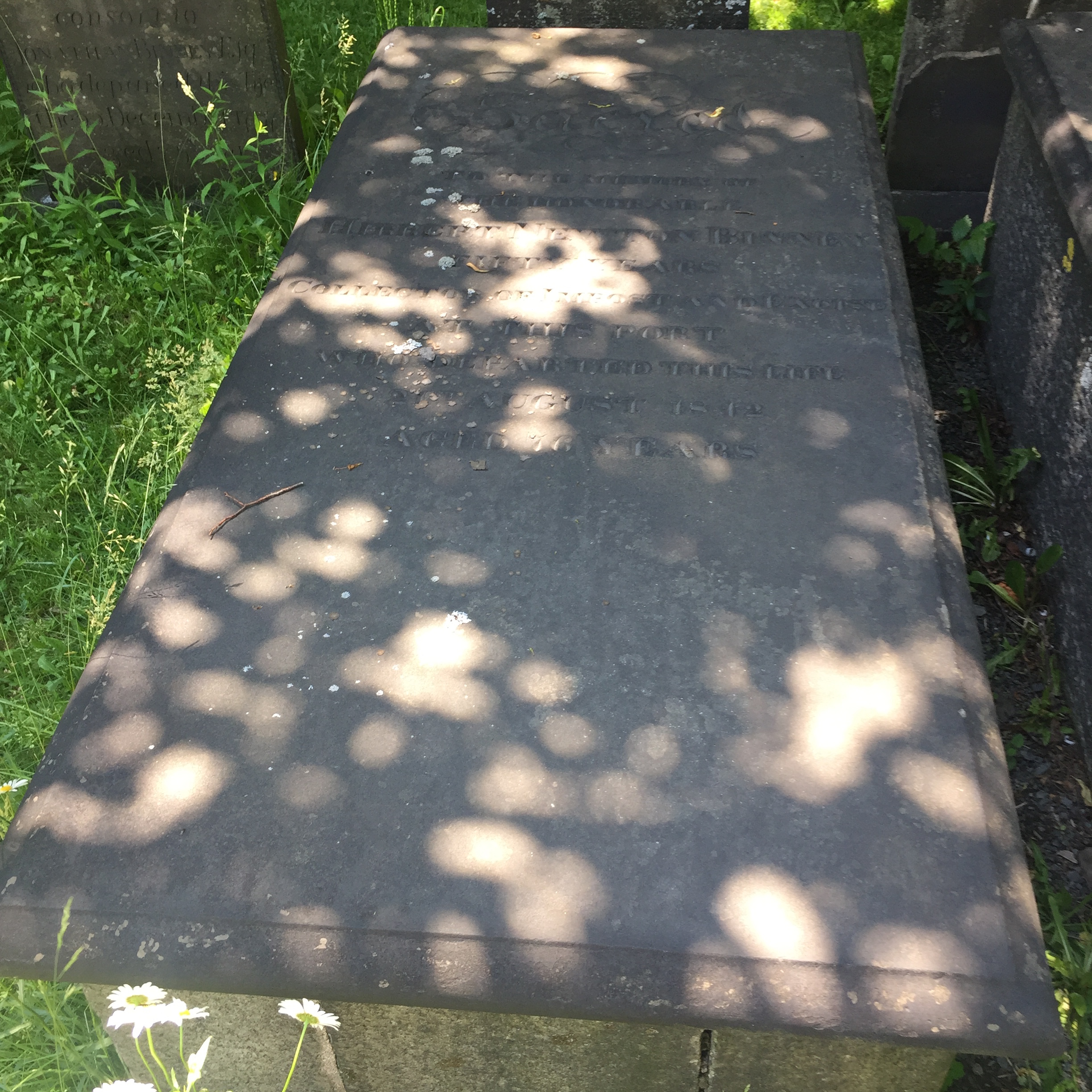
Hibbert N Binney, Old Burying Ground, Halifax, Nova Scotia

== See also ==
- Nova Scotia in the American Revolution

== Links ==
- Binney's paintings
