= Hirschhorn =

Hirschhorn is derived from German composite word "Hirsch" (deer) and "Horn" (horn), part of a deer's antlers. A variation is Hirshhorn. It may refer to:

== Places ==
- Hirschhorn (Neckar), a town in Hesse, Germany
- Hirschhorn, Rhineland-Palatinate, a municipality in Rhineland-Palatinate, Germany
- Hirshhorn Museum and Sculpture Garden in Washington, D.C.

== People ==
- Hal Hirshorn (1965–2025), American painter and photographer
- Joel Hirschhorn (1938–2005), American songwriter
- Joseph Hirshhorn (1899–1981), Latvian-American entrepreneur, financier and art collector (also see Hirshhorn Museum and Sculpture Garden)
- Kurt Hirschhorn (1926–2022), researcher of Wolf–Hirschhorn syndrome
- Norbert Hirschhorn (1938–), American public health physician
- Philippe Hirschhorn (1946–1996), Latvian violinist
- Samuel Hirszhorn (1876–1942), Polish writer, journalist, and politician
- Sheea Herschorn (1893–1969), Chief Rabbi of Montreal
- Thomas Hirschhorn (born 1957), Swiss installation artist

== See also ==
- Hirschhorn tiling, a non-periodic tessellation
- Hartshorn (disambiguation)
