= Nova Scotia Council =

British administrative and judicial body in Nova Scotia

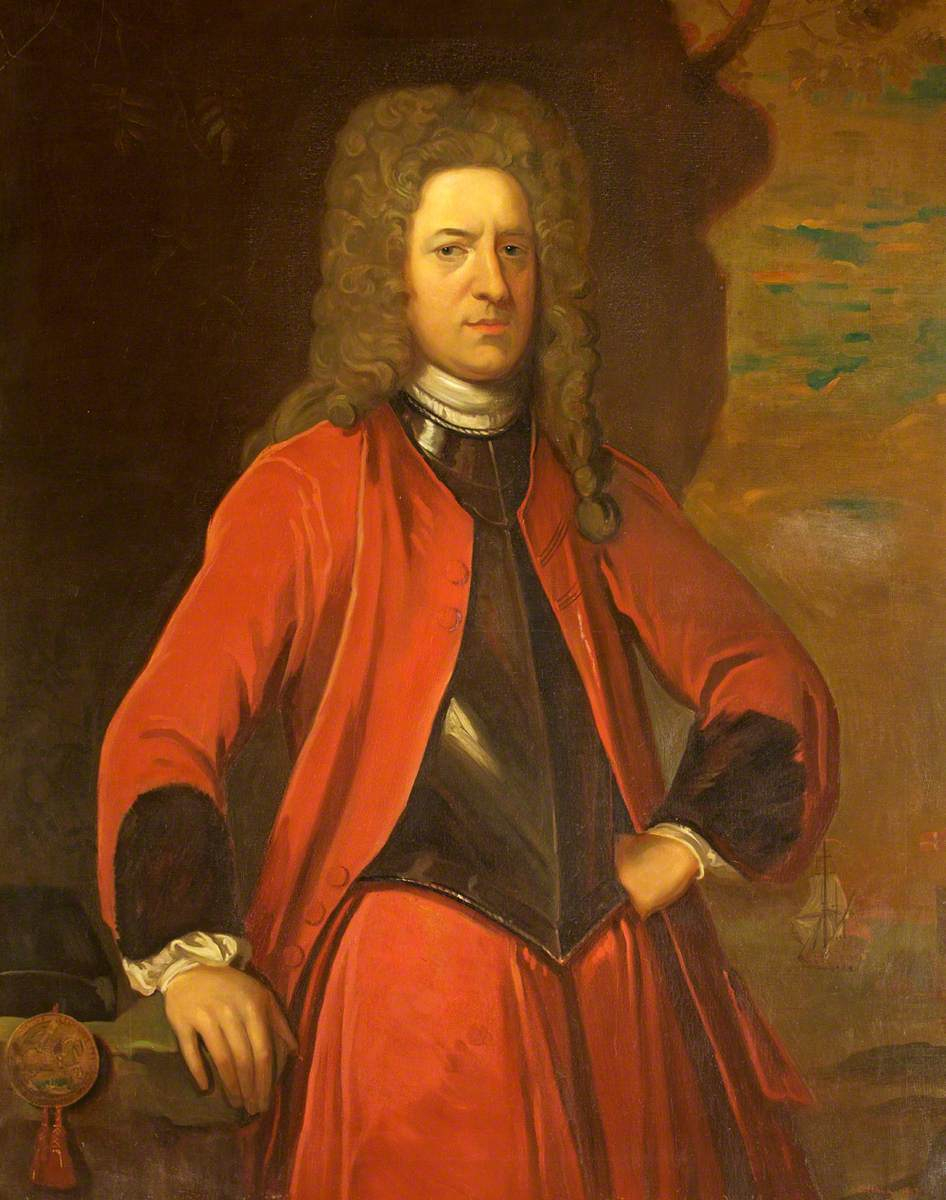
Governor of Nova Scotia Richard Philipps, created the Nova Scotia Council (1720)

Formally known as "His Majesty's Council of Nova Scotia", the Nova Scotia Council (1720–1838) was the original British administrative, legislative and judicial body in Nova Scotia. The Nova Scotia Council was also known as the Annapolis Council (prior to 1749) and the Halifax Council (after 1749). After 1749, when the judicial courts were established, the Nova Scotia Council was limited to administrative and legislative powers.

There was no legislative assembly in British-ruled Nova Scotia from the time of the conquest in 1710 until during the Seven Years' War in 1758. The Lords Commissioners for Trade and Plantations (or simply the Board of Trade) in London through much of the 1750s pressured the various governors in Nova Scotia to establish the General Assembly of Nova Scotia. The lack of civil government with an elected assembly was a drawback to attracting settlers from the older, established colonies of New England where the population was expanding and seeking new lands. New Englanders wanted guarantees that they would have governmental institutions the same as or similar to what they had become accustomed in New England. In 1758 the Board of Trade, anxious to attract settlers to found new townships, ordered Col. Charles Lawrence to hold an election and convene an assembly.

When the 1st General Assembly was established in 1758, the Nova Scotia Council became its Upper House until 1838, when the Council was divided into the Executive Council and the Legislative Council. The Legislative Council was subsequently dissolved in 1928.

== Council at Annapolis Royal ==
=== Governor Richard Philipps (1720–22) ===
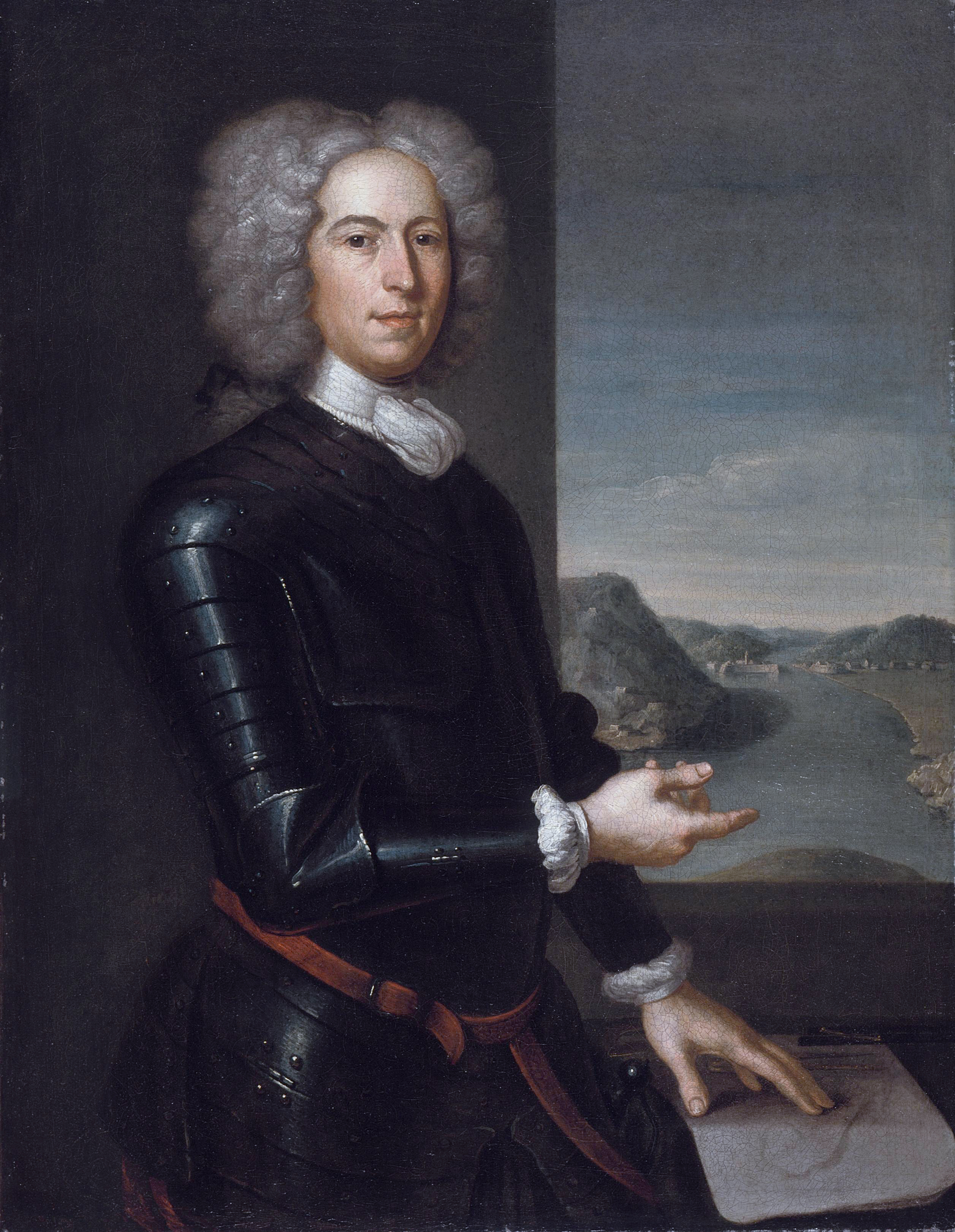
Paul Mascarene by John Smibert, 1729

- John Lawrence Armstrong
- Paul Mascarene
- Rev. John Harrison
- John Adams
- Cyprian Southack
- Arthur Savage
- Hibbert Newton (father of Henry Newton)
- William Skene
- William Shirreff
- Peter Boudre

=== Administrator John Doucett (1722–1725) ===
- Paul Mascarene
- William Skene
- Alexander Cosby
- John Adams
- William Shirreff

=== Lt. Governor Lawrence Armstrong (1725–1739) ===
- Erasmus James Philipps
- Paul Mascarene
- William Winniett
- William Skene
- John Adams
- William Shirreff
- Otho Hamilton

=== Lt. Governor Alexander Cosby (1739–1740) ===
- Paul Mascarene
- Erasmus James Philipps
- John Adams
- William Shirreff
- William Skene
- Otho Hamilton

=== Lt. Governor Paul Mascarene (1740–1749) ===
- John Gorham
- Otho Hamilton
- Henry Cope
- Erasmus James Philipps
- William Skene
- John Handfield
- Edward Amhurst
- John Salter
- John Adams
- William Shirreff

== Council at Halifax ==
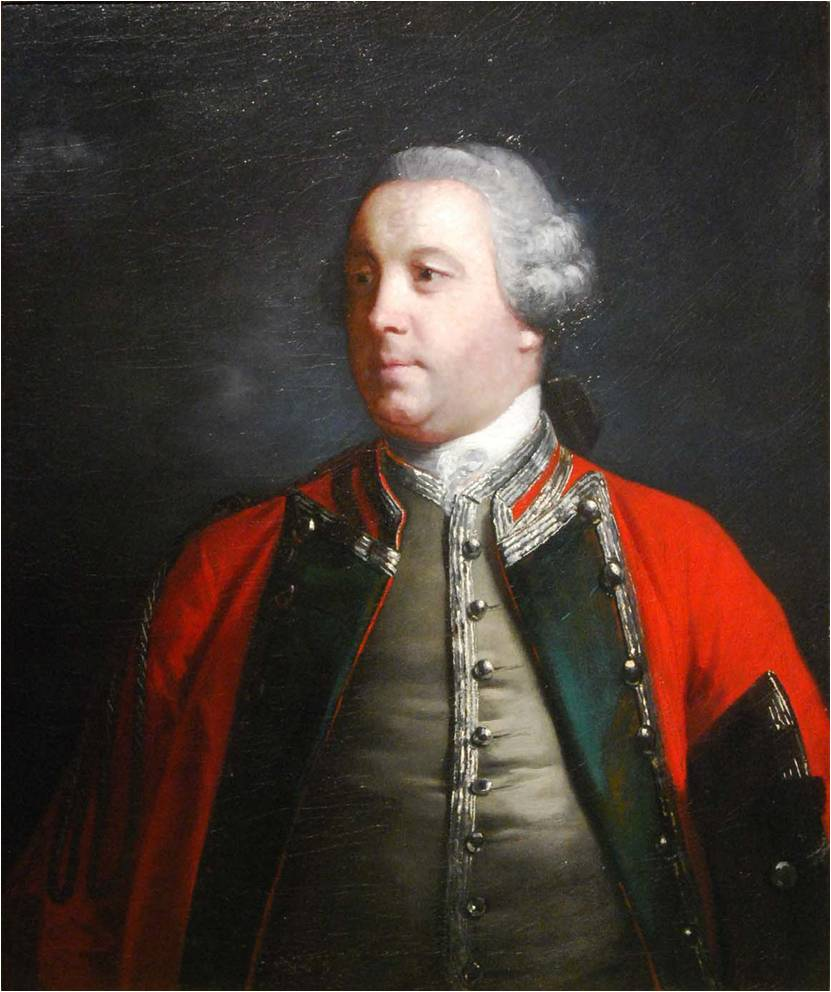
Edward Cornwallis - established the Nova Scotia Council at Halifax (1749)

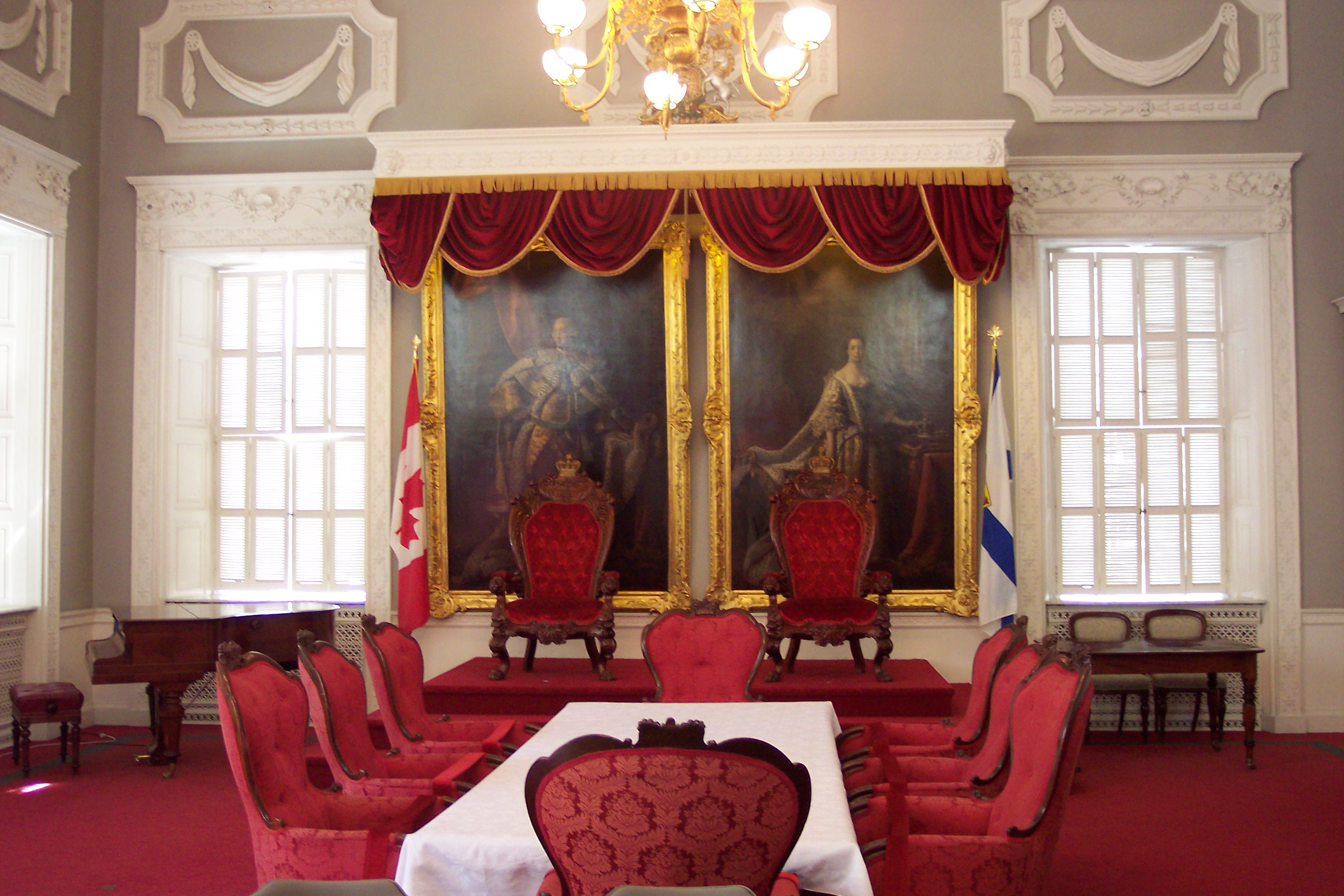
The table first used by Edward Cornwallis and the Nova Scotia Council (1749), The Red Chamber of Province House (Nova Scotia)

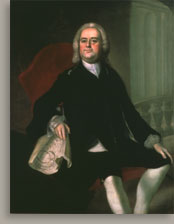
Benjamin Green by Joseph Blackburn

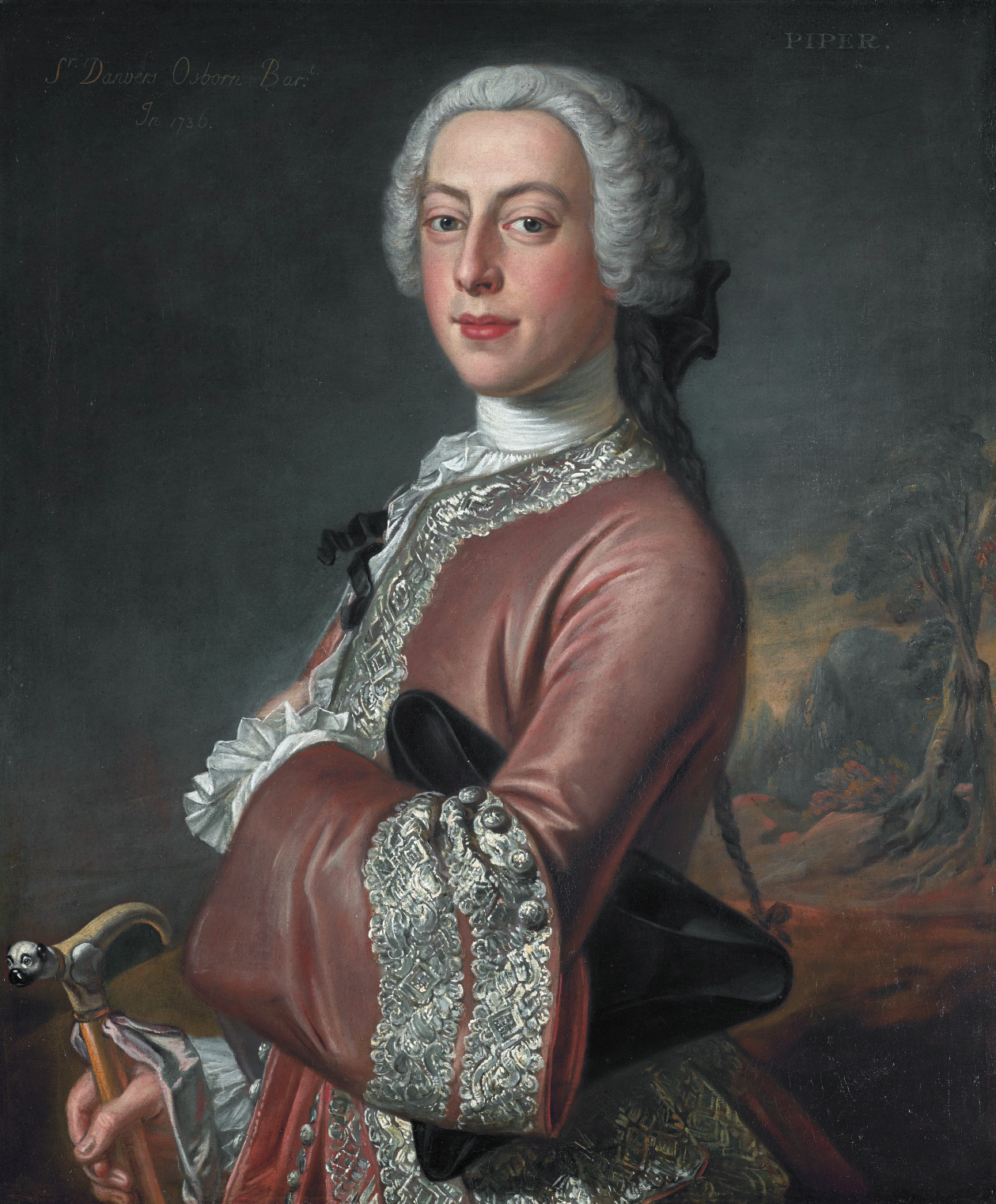
Sir Danvers Osborn, 3rd Baronet

=== Governor Edward Cornwallis (1749–1752) ===
- Erasmus James Philipps? 1731–1760
- Paul Mascarene 1749–1760?
- Captain Edward How or Howe 1749–1750
- John Gorham 1749–1751
- Benjamin Green 1749–1772
- John Salusbury 1749–1753 returned to London
- Hugh Davidson (secretary) 1749-?
- William Steele 1749–1759
- Peregrine Hopson 1749–1752 named Governor
- Robert Ellison 1749-?
- James F Mercer 1749-?
- Col. John Horseman 1749-?
- Charles Lawrence 1749–1754 named Lt. Gov.
- John Collier 1752–1768
- Captain George Fotheringham 1752-?

=== Governor Peregrine Hopson (1752–1753) ===
- Sir Danvers Osborn, 3rd Baronet 1752–1753 named Gov. of NY
- William Cotterell 1752–1759
- Robert Monckton 1753–1755 named Lt. Gov.
- John Duport (clerk)

=== Governor Charles Lawrence (1753–1760) ===
- John Rous 1754–1760
- Jonathan Belcher 1754–1761 named Lt. Gov.
- Montague Wilmot 1755–1763 named Lt. Gov.
- Charles Morris (1711-81) 1755–1781?
- Robert Grant 1756-?
- Richard Bulkeley 1759–1800
- Thomas Saul 1759–1760 returned to England
- Joseph Gerrish 1759–1762, 1763

=== Lt. Governor Jonathan Belcher (1760–1763) ===
- Alexander Grant 1761-?
- Edm. Crawley 1761-?
- Henry Newton 1761–1802
- Michael Francklin 1762–1766 named Lt. Gov.

=== Governor Montague Wilmot (1763–1766) ===
- William Nesbitt 1763 (declined to serve)
- Sebastian Zouberbuhler 1763–1773
- Jonathan Binney 1764–1807

=== Governor William Campbell (1766–1773) ===
- Joseph Gorham 1766–1770? named Lt. Gov. of Placentia
- Benjamin Gerrish 1768–1772?
- Colonel Arthur Goold or Gould 1772-a/o 1777
- John Butler 1772–1781? left Nova Scotia

=== Governor Francis Legge (1773–1776) ===
- J. Burrow 1774-?
- John Creighton 1775–1788 (last attended 1785)

==== Lieutenant-Governor Mariot Arbuthnot (1776–1778) ====
- Bryan Finucane 1778–1785

==== Lieutenant-Governor Andrew Hammond (1781–1782) ====
- Alexander Brymer 1782–1801 left for England

=== Governor John Parr (1782–1786) ===
- Edmund Fanning 1783–1786 served as Lt. Gov.
- Isaac Deschamps 1783–1785? named Chief Justice of Supreme Court
- Thomas Cochran 1785–1801
- Charles Morris (1731–1802) 1785–1802

=== Lieutenant-Governor John Parr (1786–1791) ===
- J. Halliburton 1787-?
- Henry Duncan 1788–1801
- Sampson Salter Blowers 1788–1833

=== Lieutenant-Governor Sir John Wentworth (1792–1808) ===
- James Michael Freke Bulkeley clerk 1792–1796
- Thomas Strange 1792–1796 returned to England
- James De Lancey 1794–1801 resigned for illness
- Ben. Wentworth 1795-?
- James Brenton 1799–1806
- Andrew Belcher 1801–1813
- William Forsyth 1801–1808 returned to Scotland
- C. M. Wentworth 1801-?
- Lawrence Hartshorne 1801–1804, 1807–1822
- Alexander Croke 1802–1815 left NS
- Michael Wallace 1803–1831
- John Butler Butler 1804-c.1815? left for England
- Charles Hill 1807–1825

=== Lieutenant-Governor George Prevost (1808–1811) ===
- Richard John Uniacke 1808–1830
- Charles Morris (1759–1831) 1808–1831
- Charles Inglis 1809–1816 (1st Anglican bishop of NS)
- Samuel Hood George (clerk) 1808–1813

=== Lieutenant-Governor John Coape Sherbrooke (1811–1816) ===
- James Stewart 1811–1830
- Thomas Nickleson Jeffery 1811–1838 transferred to Executive Council
- Foster Hutchinson 1813–1815
- John Black 1813–1823
- Brenton Halliburton 1815–1837 Judges removed from Council
- Hon. P. Woodhouse 1815-?

=== Lieutenant-Governor George Ramsay (1816–1820) ===
- Robert Stanser 1816-? retired 1824, but left for England 1817. (2nd Anglican bishop of NS)
- James Fraser 1818–1822
- H. Binney 1819-?

=== Lieutenant-Governor James Kempt (1820–1828) ===
- Enos Collins 1822–1838 transferred to Executive Council
- Simon Bradstreet Robie 1824–1838 transferred to Executive Council
- Charles Ramage Prescott 1825–1838 retired
- John Inglis 1825–1838 ? (3rd Anglican bishop of NS)

=== Lieutenant-Governor Peregrine Maitland (1828–1834) ===
- Henry Hezekiah Cogswell 1831–1838 transferred to Executive Council

=== Lieutenant-Governor Colin Campbell (1834–1840) ===
1838 Council divided into Executive and Legislative Councils

== See also ==
- Executive Council of Nova Scotia
- Legislative Council of Nova Scotia
