= Governor Legge =

Governor Legge may refer to:

- George Legge, 1st Baron Dartmouth (c. 1647–1691), Governor of Portsmouth in 1673
- Francis Legge (1719–1783), Governor of Nova Scotia from 1772 to 1776
