= Heritage Trust of Nova Scotia =

Canadian non-profit society

Coordinates: 44.666842°N 63.568338°W

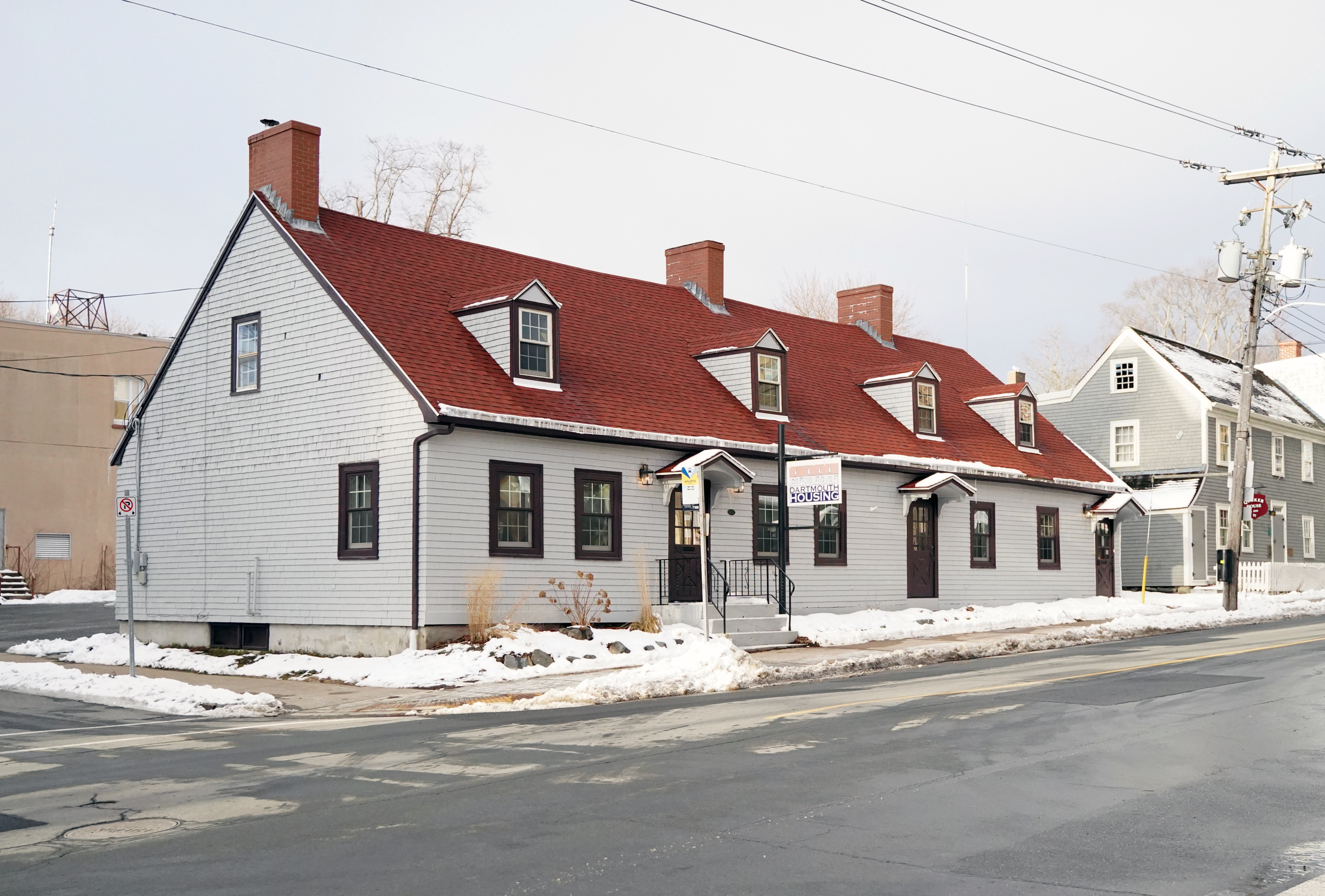
Thomas Boggs-Lawrence Hartshorne House, former office location of the Heritage Trust of Nova Scotia; now at 61 Dundas St, Dartmouth

The Heritage Trust of Nova Scotia is a non-profit society dedicated to the advocacy for and conservation of Nova Scotia's architectural and cultural heritage. It was founded in 1959, "in response to the proposed demolition of Enos Collins's Halifax House Gorsebrook," a Georgian-style home that once stood on the present site of Saint Mary's University hockey rink. The Trust has advocated for and assisted in the conservation of numerous heritage buildings and districts in Nova Scotia. Notable examples include The Carleton, Morris House, and Historic Properties.

The current chair is Andrea Arbic. The Trust's offices are located at 61 Dundas Street in Dartmouth, Nova Scotia.

The Trust publishes The Griffin, a quarterly magazine, and has published several books on the subject of Nova Scotia's built heritage.

== Morris House ==
Morris House is a 2 1/2 storey, Georgian-style building of wooden construction built in 1764 and shortly thereafter sold to Charles Morris, the first Surveyor General of Nova Scotia, who used it as his office. Morris House was slated for demolition in 2009. The Heritage Trust of Nova Scotia purchased Morris House and in 2013 transported the structure from its original site at 1237 Hollis Street to a new site at 2500 Creighton Street. Exterior renovations were largely complete as of 2014. Interior renovations were delayed due to disagreements over a preservation strategy, and began in earnest in 2017 after the decision was made to preserve the original interior walls behind plasterboard. In 2020, Morris House was released to St. Paul's Home, a youth housing program.

== Former St. Patrick's Rectory ==
The former St. Patrick's Rectory building is a 2 1/2 storey, Victorian Gothic building of brick construction built in 1889 to serve as a rectory for the neighbouring St. Patrick's Church. In July 2019, the Trust appealed a decision by Halifax and West Community Council to approve a nine-storey addition to the building. On 1 June 2020, the Nova Scotia Utility and Review Board upheld the council's decision.
