= Morris House (Halifax, Nova Scotia) =

Historic house in Nova Scotia, Canada

Coordinates: 44°39′20″N 63°35′26″W

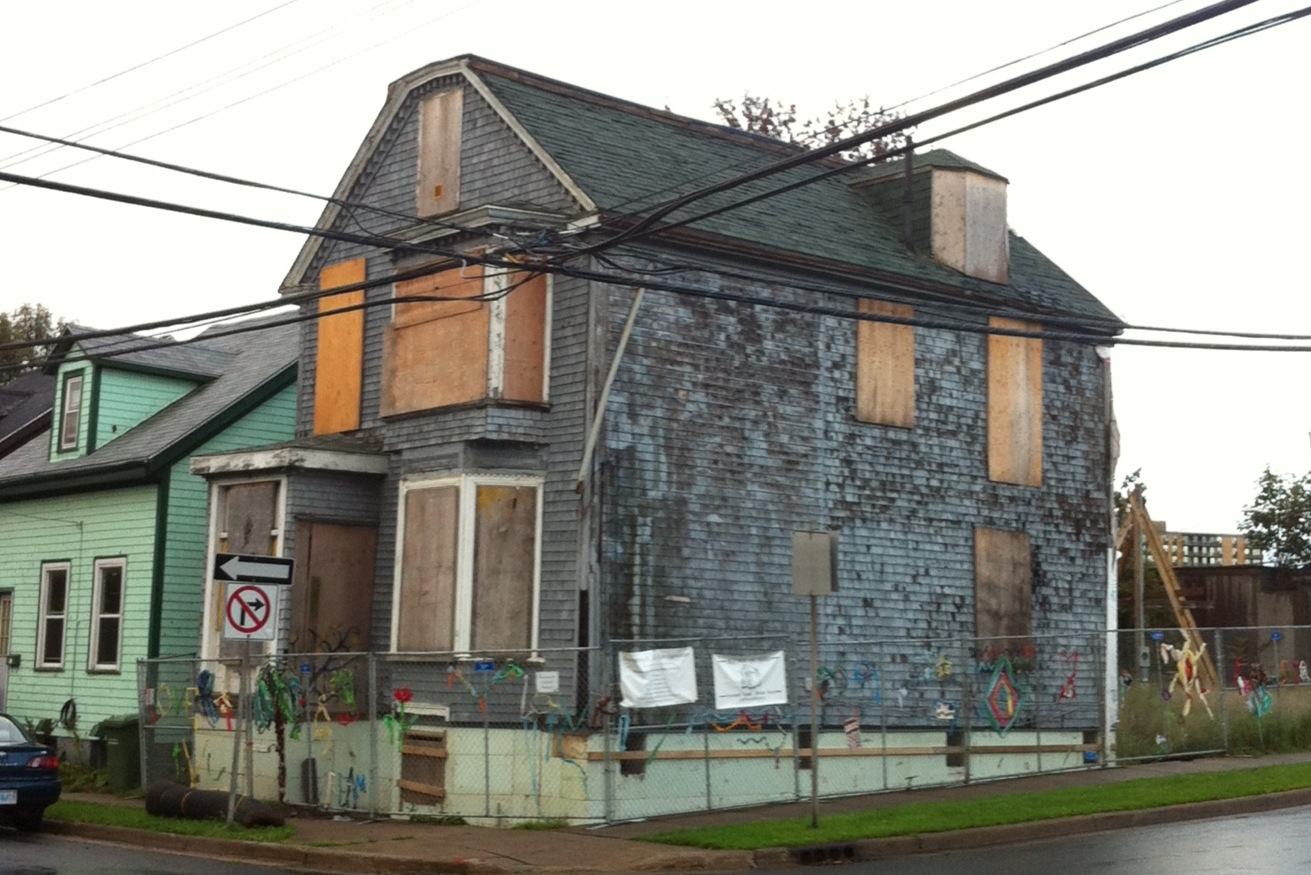
Morris House, Creighton St. Halifax, Nova Scotia

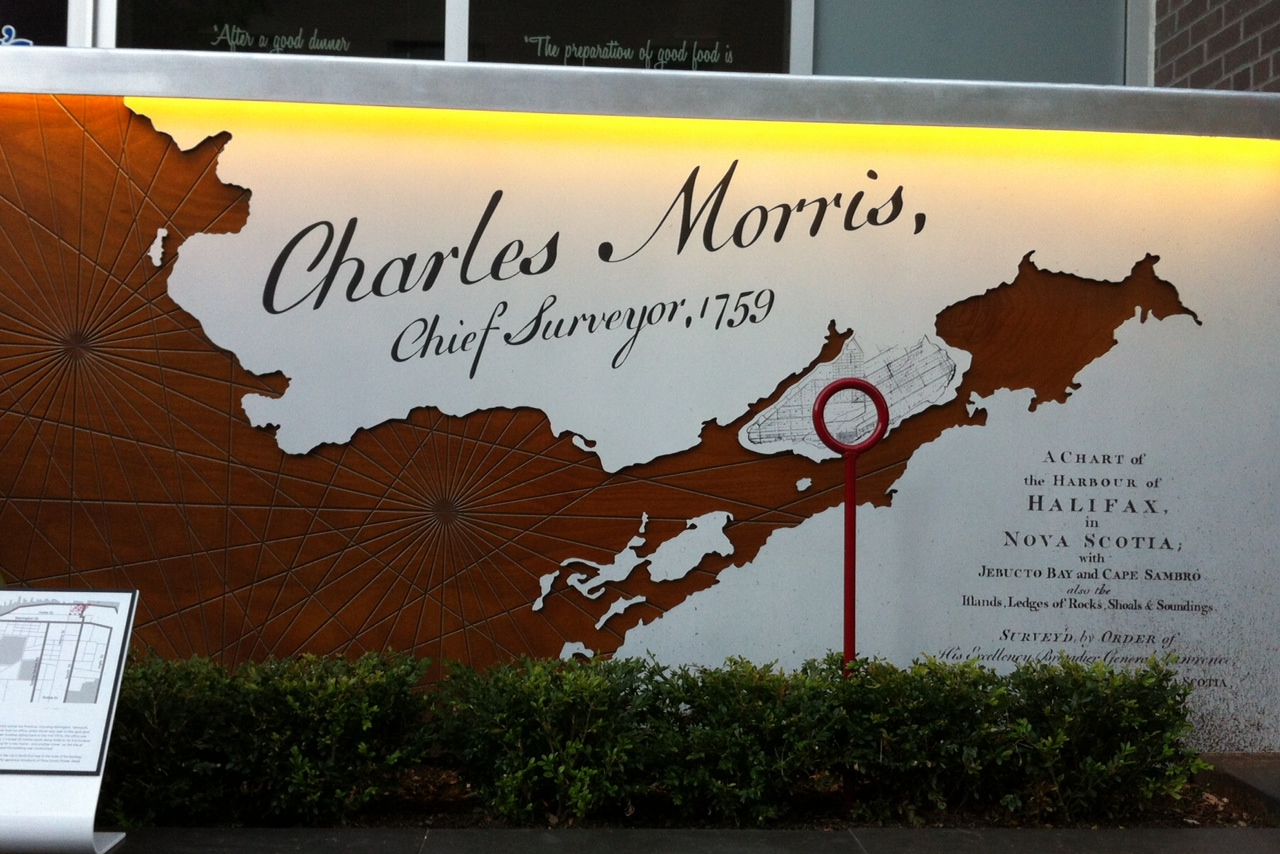
Chaining Pin and Plaque marking original Charles Morris House Location, VIC Suites on Hollis & Morris Streets, Halifax, Nova Scotia

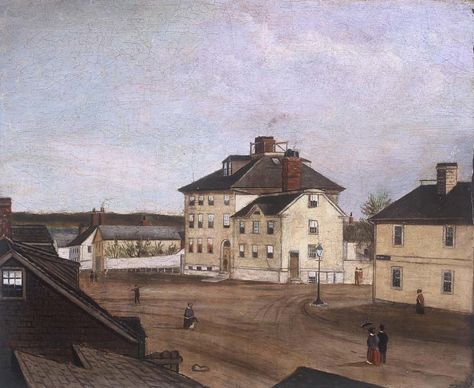
Morris House - Watercolour by R.D. Wilkie showing the Morris office on corner of Morris and Hollis Streets, with the larger Morris family home behind it.

Morris House (also known as the Morris Office) is the oldest wooden residence in Halifax, Nova Scotia (circa 1764) and the former office of Charles Morris (surveyor general). The house was originally located at 1273 Hollis Street, and since January 2013 has been located at 2500 Creighton Street. The Morris family used the house as their office for eighty years. There were four generations of the Morris family, a dynasty of Surveyors General of Nova Scotia, who used the building as their office. Due to the efforts of the Heritage Trust of Nova Scotia and others, the house has been salvaged from demolition in 2009. The original property was owned by Dennis Heffernan who sold it to Charles Morris Jr. in 1777, who likely had his father stay with him.

A Raman spectroscopic chemical analysis study at Saint Mary's University revealed that the interior paints and wallpaper contained 19th century inorganic pigments such as basic lead carbonate (white lead), lead carbonate, barium sulfate, calcium carbonate (chalk), and chromium(III) oxide (chrome green). The exterior was painted with a modern synthetic pigment, copper phthalocyanine (Phthalocyanine Blue BN).

Local design firm Breakhouse partnered with eyecandy SIGNS INC. to design and build the monument sign that honours the life and home of Charles Morris. The sign is installed at the original location of the house. The house has been moved to Charles St in the North End of Halifax.

== See also ==
- List of oldest buildings and structures in Halifax, Nova Scotia
- History of the Halifax Regional Municipality
- Great Pontack (Halifax)
