= James Bulkeley =

James Bulkeley may refer to:

- James Bulkeley, 6th Viscount Bulkeley (1716/17–1752), Welsh landowner and politician
- James Michael Freke Bulkeley (1761–1796), civil servant and political figure in Nova Scotia
