= Charles Morris (1759–1831) =

Canadian politician

Charles Morris (November 18, 1759 – December 17, 1831) was a surveyor and political figure in Nova Scotia. He represented Halifax County in the Legislative Assembly of Nova Scotia from 1788 to 1793 and from 1797 to 1806.

He was born in Hopkinton, Massachusetts, grandson of Charles Morris (1711-81), the son of Charles Morris (1731-1802) and Elizabeth Bond Leggett, and probably first came to Halifax in 1760 with his parents. He was named a lieutenant in the Royal Nova Scotia Volunteer Regiment in 1778 and transferred to the 70th Foot the following year. In 1783, he retired on half pay. Some time later, he began assisting his father who was surveyor general for Nova Scotia. In 1786, he married Charlotte Pernette, daughter of Joseph Pernette. Morris was elected to the assembly on Feb. 22,1788 in a by-election held after Sampson Salter Blowers was named to the Nova Scotia Council. He took his seat March 12, 1789. He did not run for reelection in 1793 but was elected again in a 1797 by-election held after the death of James Michael Freke Bulkeley. He succeeded his father as surveyor general in 1802. In 1808, Morris was named to the Nova Scotia Council and served until his death in 1831. He also served as a justice of the peace, as a captain then major in the Halifax militia, as registrar of wills and probate, as surrogate general of the court of probate and as registrar of the Vice-Admiralty Court.

== Family life and death ==
Morris died in Halifax at the age of 72 and is buried in the Old Burying Ground (Halifax, Nova Scotia).

In 1831, his son John Spry Morris succeeded him as surveyor general.

Government offices
Preceded by Charles Morris (1731–1802)	Surveyor General of Nova Scotia; 1802–1831	Succeeded by John Spry Morris
