= Hartshorne =

Hartshorne may refer to:

- Hartshorne (surname)

== Places ==
- Hartshorne, Derbyshire, a village in England
- Hartshorne, Oklahoma, a US city
- Hartshorne Island, an island between Dakers Island and Howard Island in eastern Joubin Islands
- Hartshorne Woods Park, a park in New Jersey

== Mathematics ==
- Hartshorne ellipse

== See also ==
- Hartshorn (disambiguation)
