= James Stewart (Nova Scotia politician) =

Canadian politician

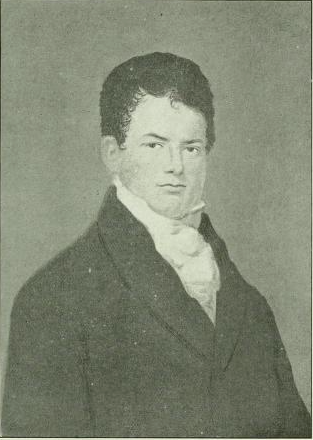
James Stewart (1765-1830)

James Stewart (1765 – February 5, 1830) was a British America-born lawyer, judge and political figure in Nova Scotia. He represented Halifax County in the Legislative Assembly of Nova Scotia from 1798 to 1799. His name also appears as James Stuart. He was a member of the North British Society.

He was born in Annapolis, Maryland, the son of Anthony Stewart, a loyalist. Stewart came to Halifax with his father around 1780. He was educated in Halifax and at University of Edinburgh. In 1790, he married Elizabeth, the daughter of John Halliburton, a member of the Nova Scotia Council. Stewart was elected to the assembly in a 1798 by-election held following the death of Jonathan Sterns. In May 1798, he was named solicitor general. He became a justice in the Supreme Court of Nova Scotia in 1815. Stewart served as a member of the Nova Scotia Council from 1816 until his death in Halifax. He is buried in the Old Burying Ground (Halifax, Nova Scotia).
