= Royal Nova Scotia Volunteer Regiment =

Loyal Regiment of Nova Scotia Volunteers (1775-1780) Royal Regiment of Nova Scotia Volunteers (1780-1783)
- Active: 1775-1783
- Country: Great Britain
- Allegiance: King George III
- Branch: British provincial corps
- Type: infantry, (auxiliary troops)
- Role: garrison troops
- Size: 5 or 6 companies (battalion)
- Garrison/HQ: Halifax (1780-1783); Fort Sackville (Nova Scotia), Nova Scotia (1780-1783); Prince Edward Island (1782-1783)
- Engagements: American Revolutionary War: Never saw combat

Commanders
- Notable commanders: Colonel Francis Legge; Governor John Parr

The Royal Nova Scotia Volunteer Regiment, also known as the Loyal Regiment of Nova Scotia Volunteers and Loyal Nova Scotia Volunteers, from 1775-1780, the Royal Regiment of Nova Scotia Volunteers, from 1780-1783, and the Royal Nova Scotia Volunteer Regiment and Nova Scotia Volunteers, was a British Loyalist provincial battalion, of infantry, raised in 1775, to defend British interests, in the colony of Nova Scotia. The unit was commanded by Col. Francis Legge, until replaced by Col. John Parr in 1782. The Royal NS Volunteers never saw combat, but did play an important role in the defense of the colony of Nova Scotia, in the later years, of the American Revolution.

== Regiment formed ==
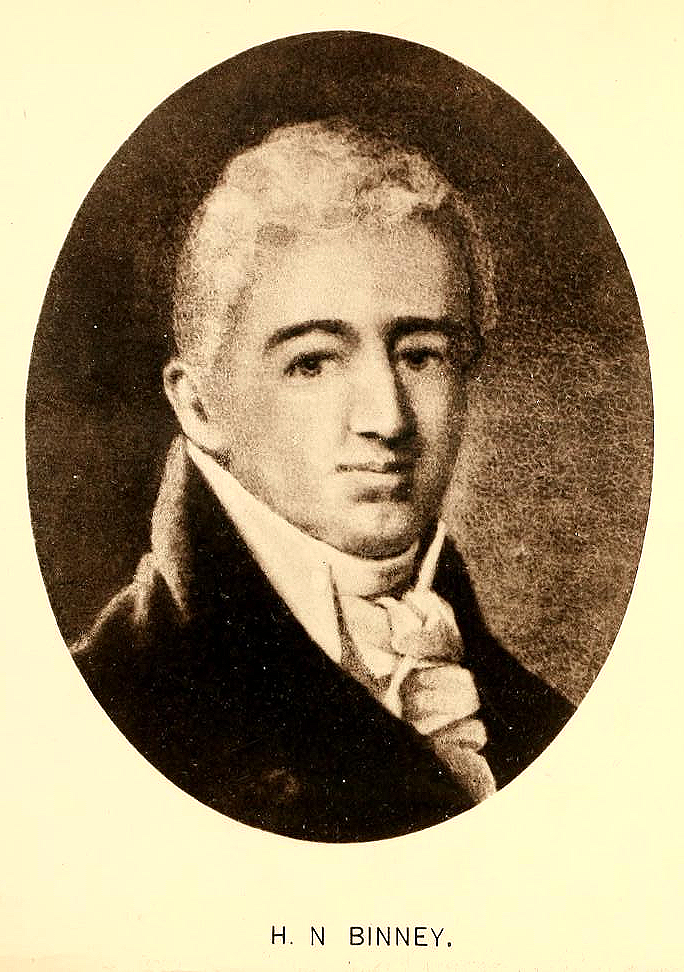
Hibbert Newton Binney, only known portrait of someone in the regiment

Francis Legge was appointed the royal governor of Nova Scotia in 1773, just as troubles were brewing in the American colonies. Legge, "an earnest but highly prejudiced and therefore much disliked man" proposed to the Secretary of State on July 31, 1775 that he be permitted to raise a regiment of 1,000 men, to be recruited from the German, neutral and Irish settlers in Nova Scotia and Newfoundland. Legge had grave doubts about the loyalty of the New England Planters who made up the majority of Nova Scotia's settlers at this point. (Legge's distrust was not entirely misplaced, as the Eddy Rebellion was to prove.) He proposed the name "Royal Nova Scotia Volunteers", but this was denied and changed to "Loyal". Some time around 1780 the "Royal" designation was bestowed for the duration of the war.

Francis Legge received a dispatch from London dated October 16, 1775, authorizing him to raise the Loyal Regiment of Nova Scotia Volunteers as a fencible unit, for strictly local defense. The recruits were to be paid and equipped like regular soldiers; they would be, in effect, a full-time home guard.

The officers of the "Royal Nova Scotia Volunteers" were mostly lawyers and other men of the Halifax establishment and Francis Legge's political hangers-on, with little or no military experience, along with a number of subalterns brought in from the British Fleet. The most distinguished senior officer was George Henry Monk, who became major and served for the duration.

Recruiting for the Loyal Regiment of Nova Scotia Volunteers proved to be extremely difficult, owing to Francis Legge's unpopularity. He was finally ordered back to Britain in May, 1776, although he remained colonel and governor in absentia until replaced by John Parr in 1782. Despite a recruiting bounty of two guineas, by April, 1776, only sixty men had been mustered, at very heavy expense. The officers were so discouraged that they sent a petition of grievances to the Secretary of State on June 14. Rather than being trained as soldiers, the men were sent to Spanish River, Cape Breton to dig coal for the army. The next summer, forty men went back to colliery while twenty served as marines on the Royal Navy sloop HMS Gage. The subalterns were returned to the Fleet.

== Service duties ==
As resentment of Francis Legge died away, the fortunes of the Loyal Regiment changed. Returns show that by February, 1780, 568 men had enlisted and 92 had deserted, for an overall strength of 476 rank and file. This was very close to the re-authorized strength of a half-battalion (500). Due to officer absences, the unit was under day-to-day command of the senior captain, John Solomon, at Fort Sackville. The Volunteers were taking a full share of garrison duties in Halifax and several outposts. Given the importance of Halifax to the overall British war effort, this was useful employment. In 1782 a detachment was sent to the Island of St. John.

Not only the size, but the desirable reputation of the Loyal Nova Scotia Volunteers grew in later years. A few months before disbandment, Brigadier-General Henry Edward Fox expressed:

... the great satisfaction he has received in seeing the two provincial battalions of Royal N.S. Volunteers and the King's Orange Rangers, and highly approves of their discipline and military appearance, more particularly of the soldierlike manoeuvres and quick-step of the Royal N. Sco. Volunteers which has so much the appearance of troops that have been employed in active service.

== Uniforms ==
In 1775-1776 the men of the Volunteers mostly wore civilian clothing; essentially, whatever they were wearing when they enlisted. Their first uniforms arrived in early 1777, green coats faced white, with white smallclothes, in common with most other Loyalist corps of the American command at that time. Officers wore silver lace. By 1779 the regiment was wearing red coats faced buff, and officers' metal had changed to gold. There is a reference to red coats faced green in 1783.

== Regiment disbanded ==
The Loyal Nova Scotia Volunteer Regiment was disbanded at noon on Monday, October 20, 1783. The officers went on half-pay, and those officers and men who wished received land grants in the area of Ship Harbour. Cpt. Thomas Green, two sergeants, five corporals, and 22 private soldiers, some with their families, took up grants ranging from 100 to 450 acres. Captain Timothy William Hierlihy and his father Lt Col. Timothy Hierlihy of the Regiment settled in Antigonish (Captain Island and Captain Pond are named after the son.)

== Notable members ==
- Gilfred Studholme
- Timothy William Hierlihy
- Charles Morris (1759–1831)
- Timothy Hierlihy
- Hibbert Newton Binney
- John Solomon (military officer)

== See also ==
- American Revolution - Nova Scotia theatre
