= Lawrence Hartshorne =

Canadian politician

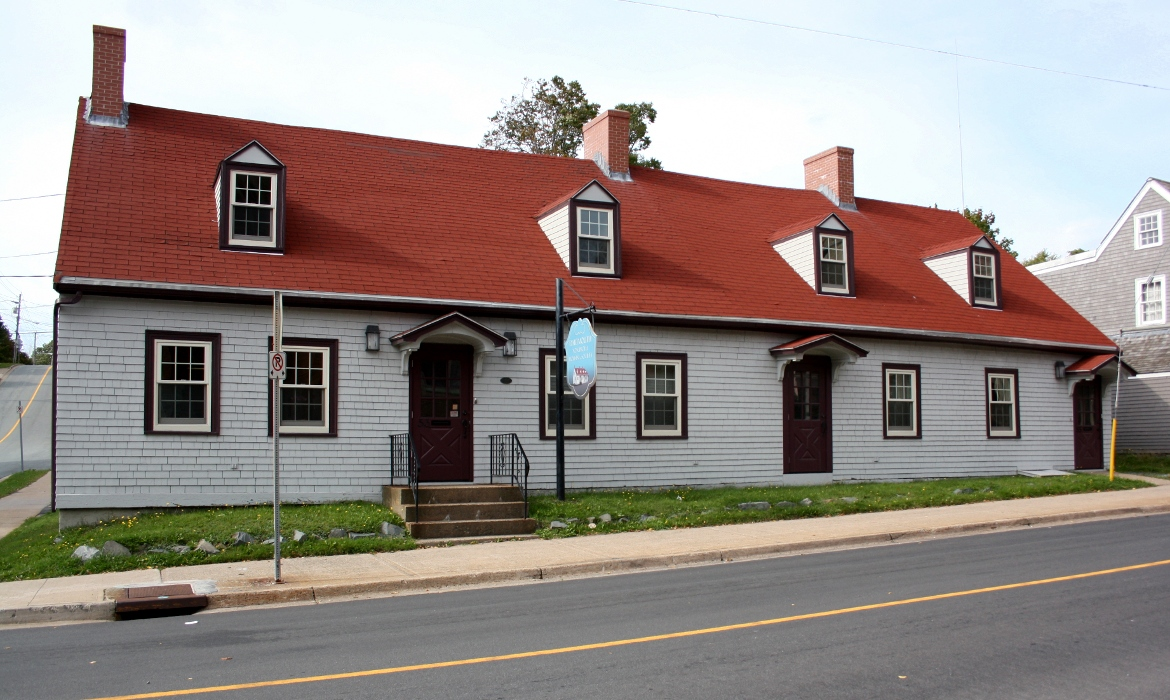
Hartshorne's house, Dartmouth, Nova Scotia

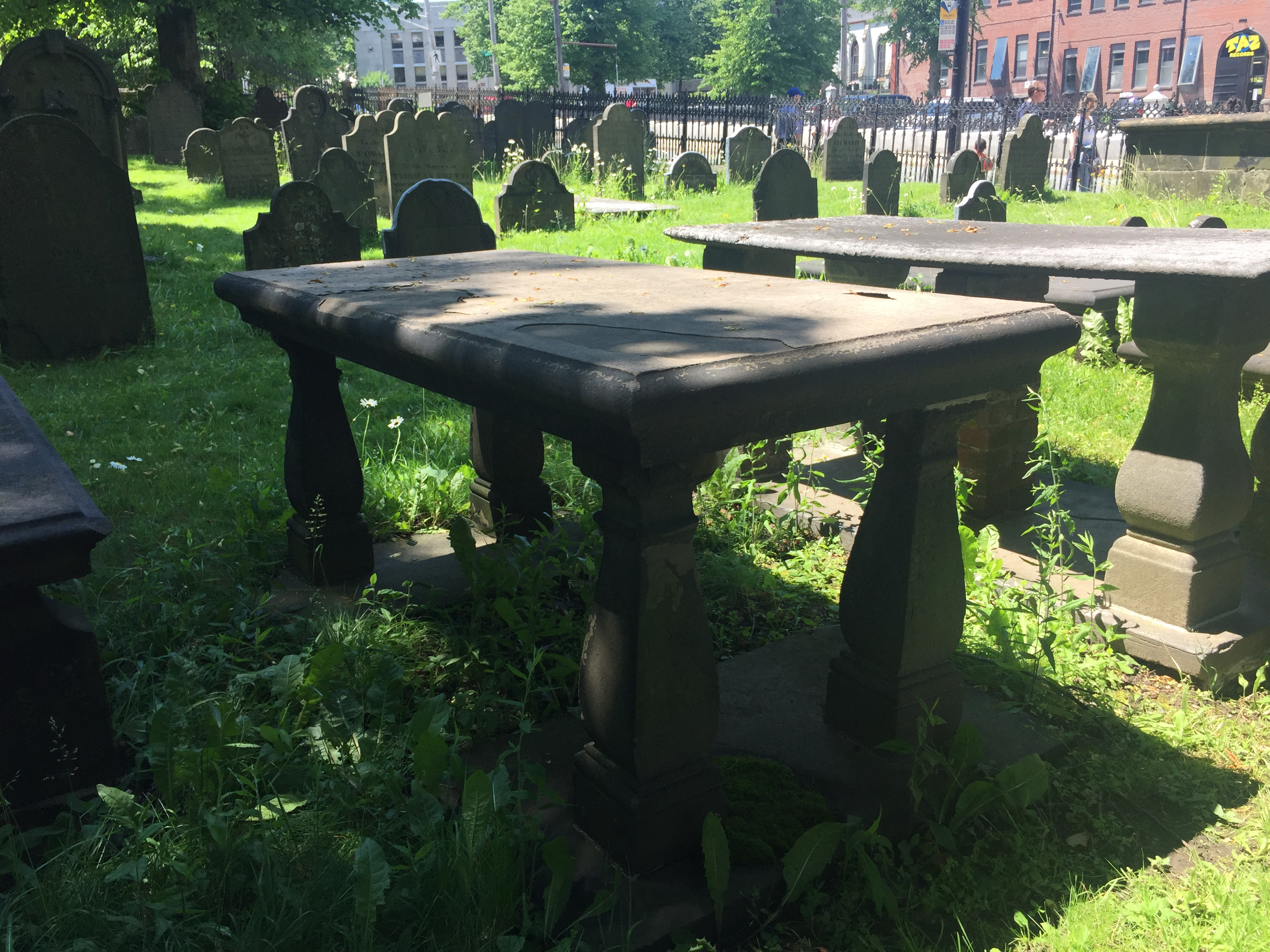
Lawrence Hartshorne, Old Burying Ground, Nova Scotia

Lawrence Hartshorne (July 1, 1755 – March 10, 1822) was a Canadian merchant and political figure based in Nova Scotia. He represented Halifax County in the Nova Scotia House of Assembly from 1793 to 1799. He was a Quaker who was the chief assistant of abolitionist John Clarkson in helping Black Nova Scotian settlers emigrate to Sierra Leone in 1792 He is recorded in the Book of Negroes for having freed four slaves.

He was born in Shrewsbury, New Jersey, the son of John Hartshorne and Lucy Saltar, and came to Nova Scotia during the American Revolution as a loyalist in 1783. In 1780, he married Elizabeth Ustick. He became a hardware dealer in Halifax. Hartshorne built a grist mill and bakery around 1792. He married the widow Abigail Tremaine in 1802 after the death of his first wife. Hartshorne served as a member of Nova Scotia's Council from 1801 to 1804 and from 1807 to 1822. He resigned from Council in 1804 to protest the appointment of John Butler Butler to the Council. He was also a magistrate and commissioner of revenue. He died at his home in Dartmouth in 1822 and was buried in the Old Burying Ground.

The home Lawrence's son built in Dartmouth, Nova Scotia in 1837 is a protected heritage property. He also founded the Hartshorne-Tremain Grist Mill (1792). His son Lawrence also served in the provincial assembly.

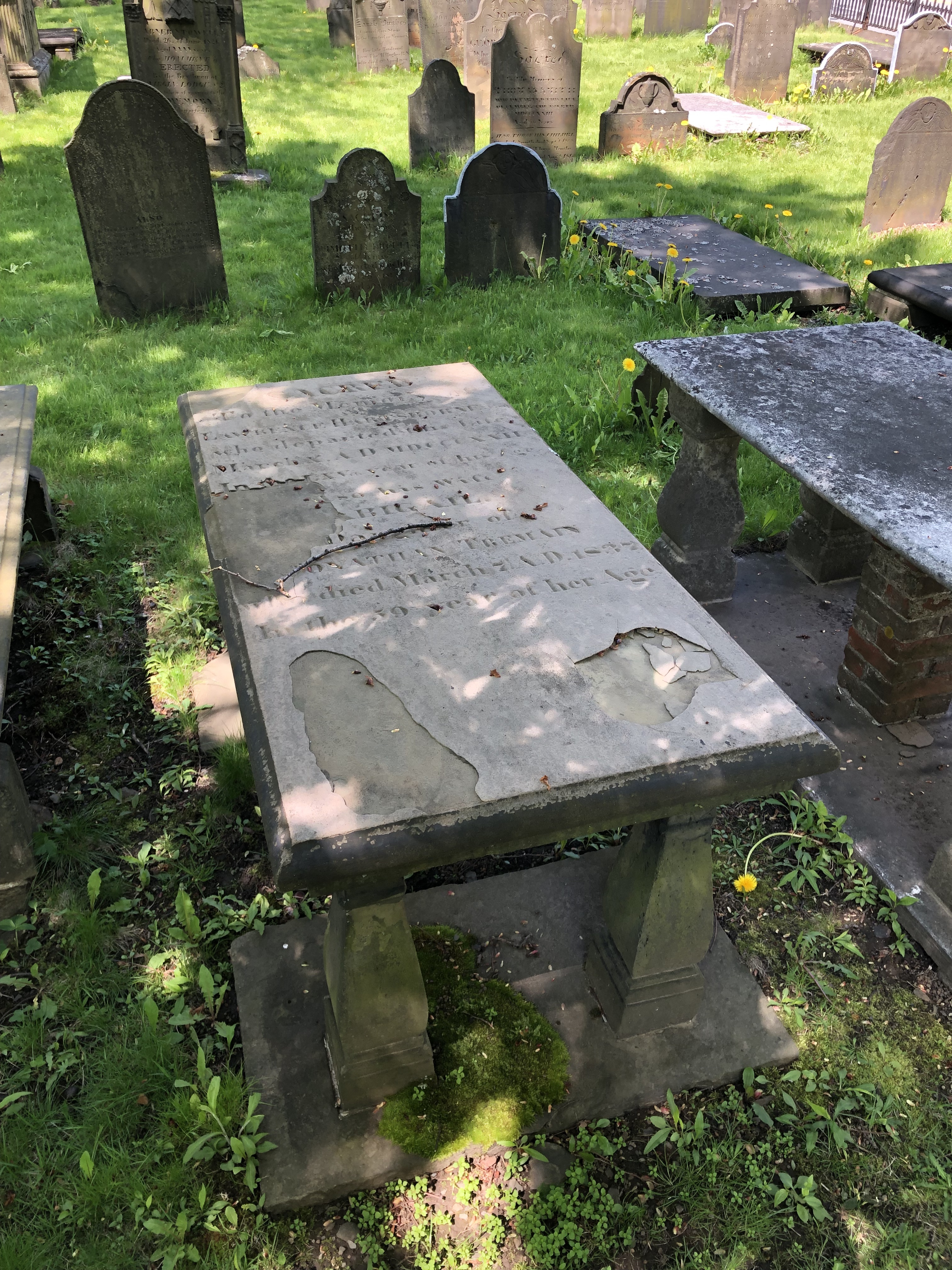
Lawrence Hartshorne, Old Burying Ground (Halifax, Nova Scotia)

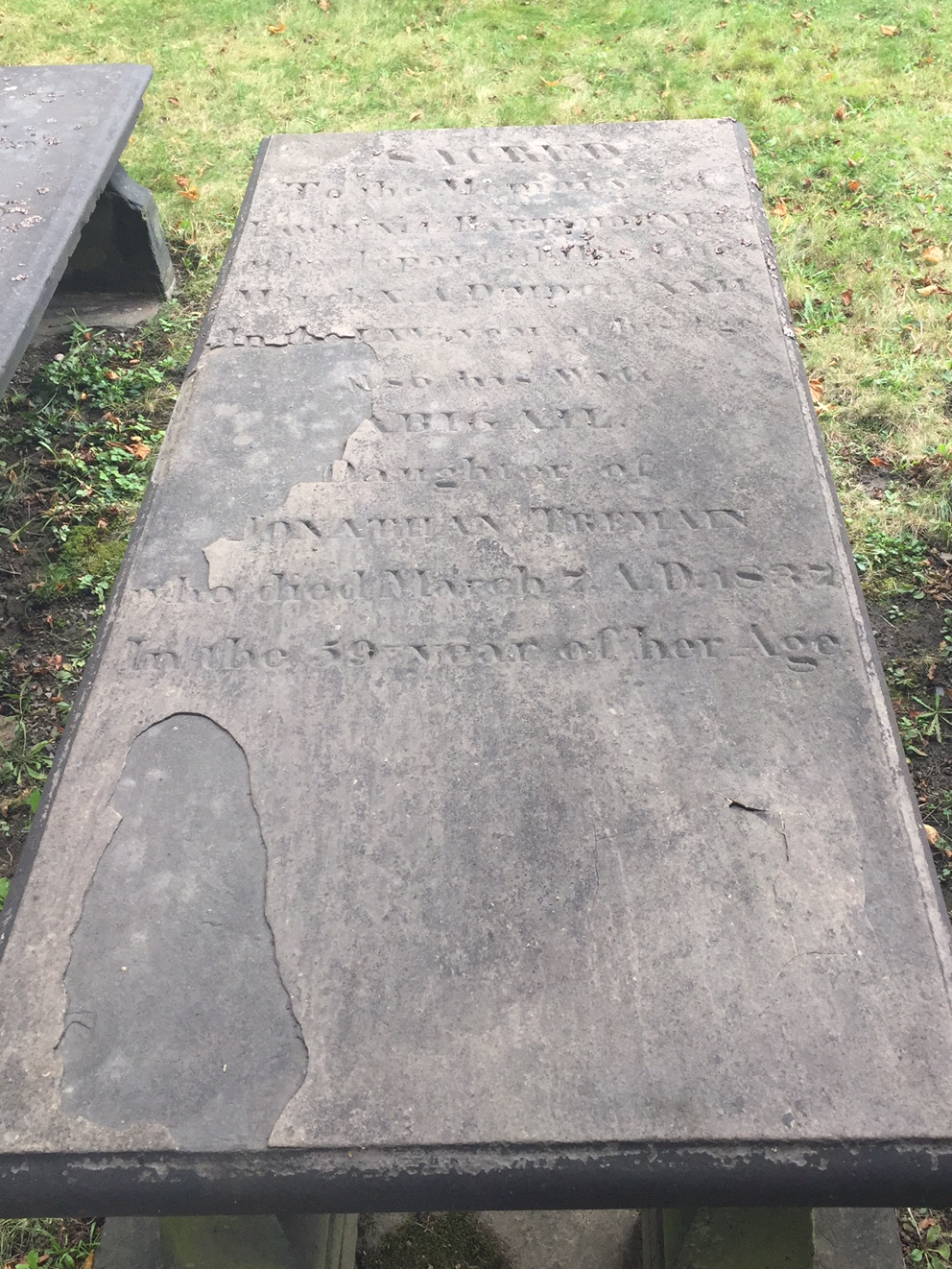
Lawrence Hartshorne, Old Burying Ground (Halifax, Nova Scotia)
