= Henry Newton (Canadian politician) =

Canadian politician

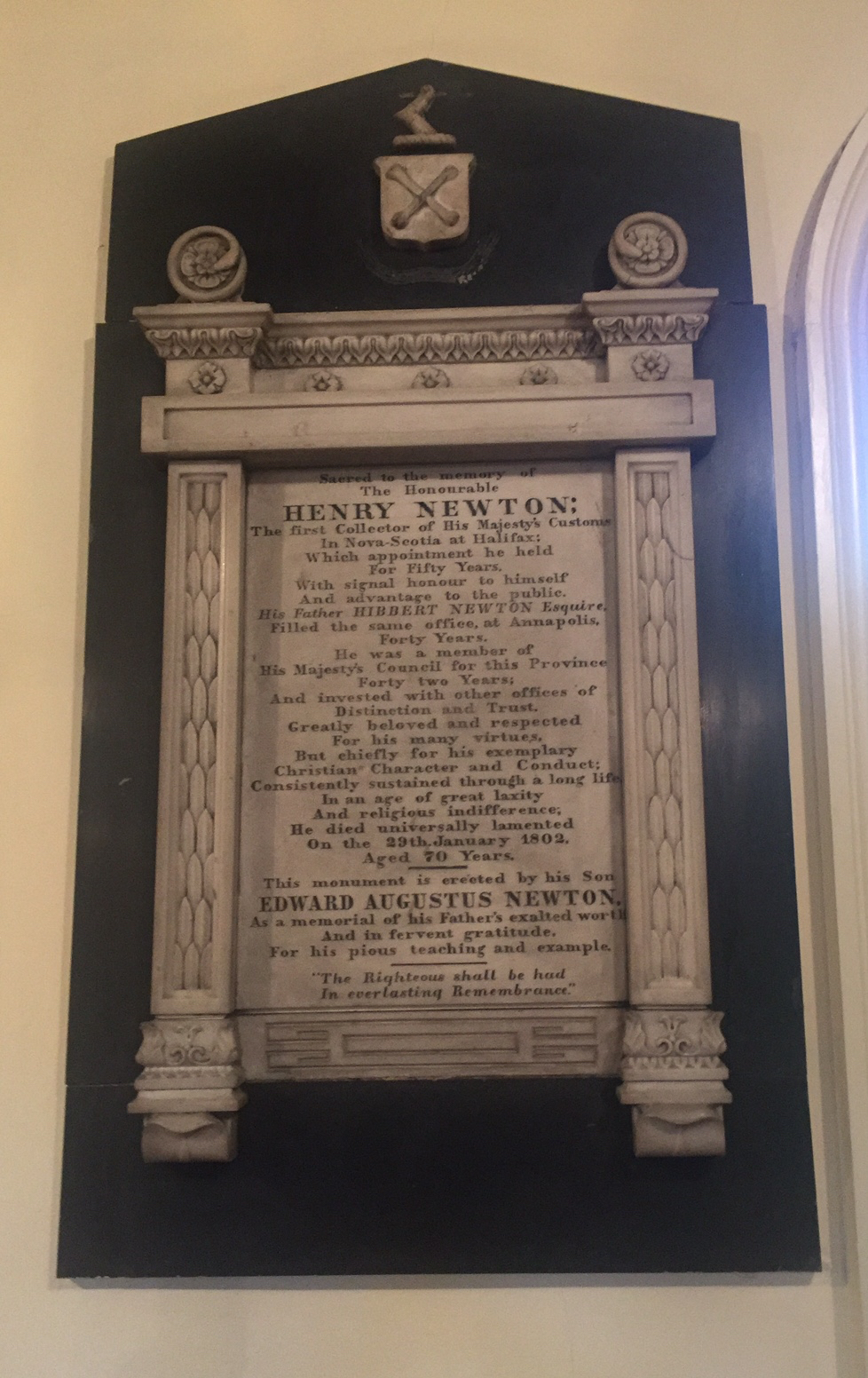
Henry Newton, St. Paul's Church (Halifax), Nova Scotia

Henry Newton (1731 – January 29, 1802) was a political figure in Nova Scotia. He was a member of the 1st and 2nd General Assembly of Nova Scotia, from 1758 to 1760.

He was the son of Hibbert Newton, member of the Nova Scotia Council and collector of customs for Nova Scotia at Annapolis Royal, Nova Scotia, and Hannah Adams, the daughter of John Adams, a member of the Legislative Council. Newton was customs collector for Halifax. He first married Charlotte, the daughter of Benjamin Green. After the death of his first wife, Newton married Anne Stuart, the daughter of Gilbert Stuart, snuff manufacturer at Boston, Massachusetts, and sister to the portrait painter painter Gilbert Stuart. In 1763, he was named to the province's Legislative Council. He died in Halifax.

His sister Hannah Adams Newton married Jonathan Binney and his brother John also served in the Nova Scotia assembly. Newton's son was Gilbert Stuart Newton who became a British painter. Newton's grandson was Hibbert Newton Binney.
