= Charles Morris (surveyor general) =

Canadian army officer, officeholder and judge

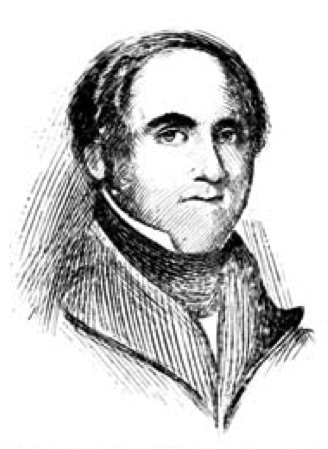
- Charles Morris in Regency Era attire

Surveyor General
- In office 1748–1781
- Monarch: George III
- Succeeded by: Charles Morris (1731–1802)

Chief Justice of the Nova Scotia Supreme Court
- In office 1776–1778
- Preceded by: Jonathan Belcher (jurist)
- Succeeded by: Bryan Finucane

Personal details
- Born: 8 June 1711 Boston, Massachusetts
- Died: 4 November 1781 (aged 70) Windsor, Nova Scotia
- Relations: Charles Morris (1731–1802), son; Charles Morris (1759–1831), grandson

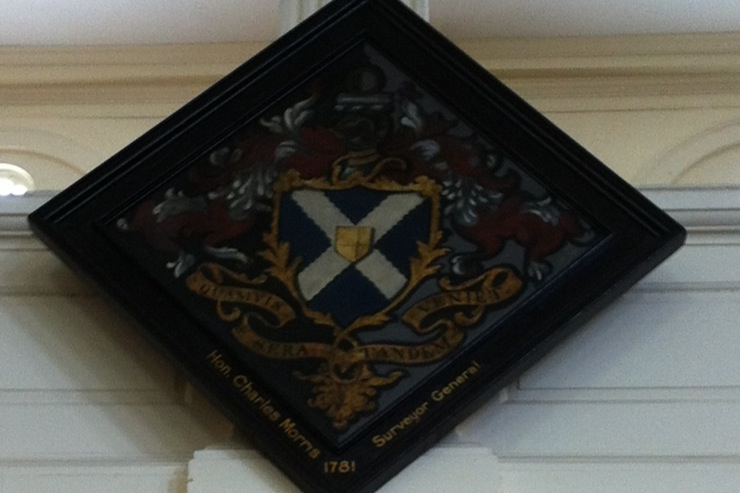
Charles Morris St. Paul's Church (Halifax), Nova Scotia

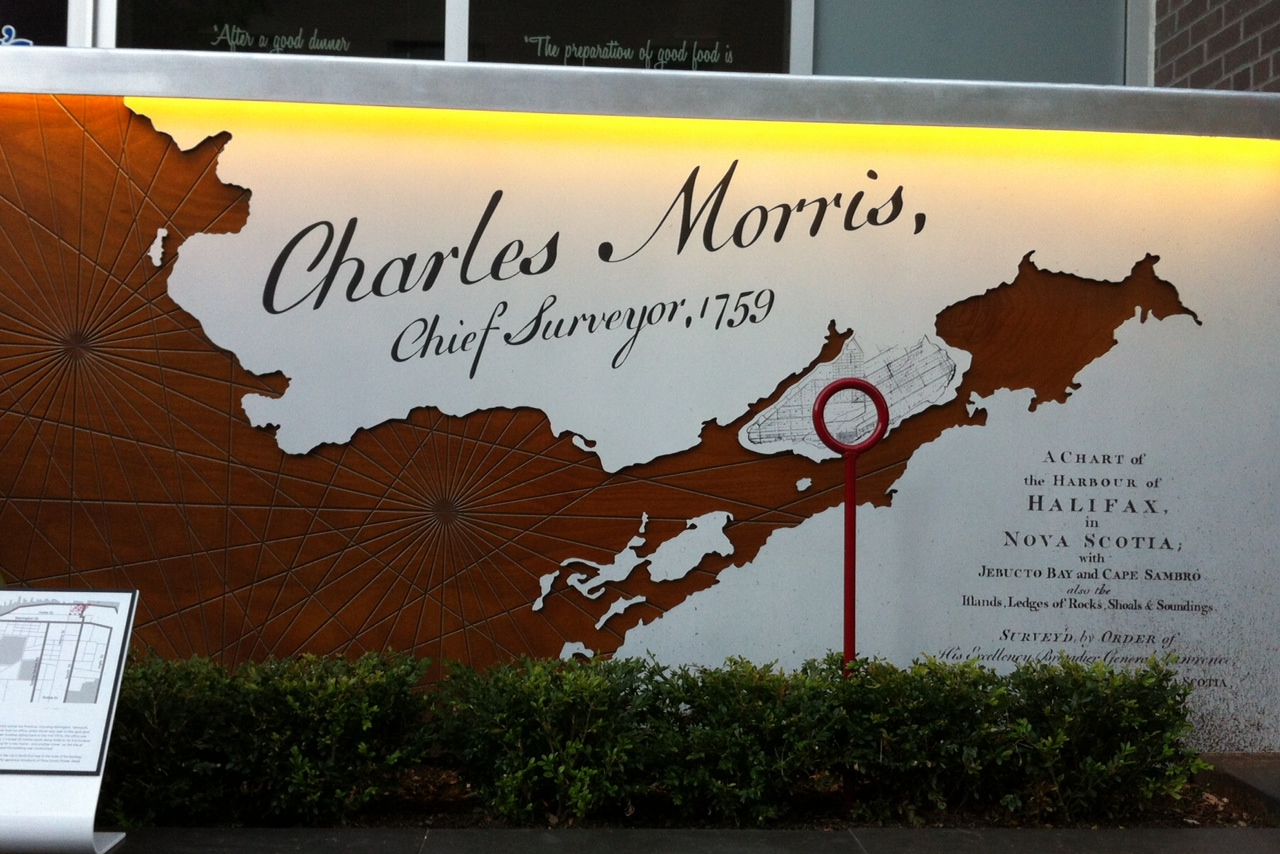
Chaining Pin and Plaque marking original Charles Morris House Location, VIC Suites on Hollis & Morris Streets, Halifax, Nova Scotia

Charles Morris (8 June 1711 – buried 4 November 1781) army officer, served on the Nova Scotia Council, Chief Justice of the Nova Scotia Supreme Court (1776–1778), and the surveyor general for over 32 years, he created some of the first British maps of Canada's maritime region and designed the layout of Halifax, Lunenburg, Lawrencetown, and Liverpool. In Halifax, he laid out both the present-day down town core and the Halifax Common.

== History ==
He was born in Boston and when he first came to the colony he fought in the Battle of Grand Pré. The maps he produced and information he gathered about the disposition of Acadians villages during his surveying of the colony was later used by the Military authority in Halifax to initiate the Expulsion of the Acadians during the French and Indian War.

He was named to the Council 30 December 1755, and did not directly participate in the expulsion decision that July. However, Morris did advocate for the removal of French "Neutrals" as the Acadians were referred to. In 1754, he presented a comprehensive plan for the removal of all Acadians to Lieutenant Governor Charles Lawrence.

He fought for and won the establishment of the Nova Scotia House of Assembly (1758). Morris was instrumental in establishing New England Planters in the colony.

As chief justice, his most famous trial was of those who participated in the Eddy Rebellion (1776) at the outbreak of the American Revolution.

He died in 1781 and was buried in the Old Parish Burying Ground in Windsor, Nova Scotia. His will was made shortly before his death; it is dated May 10, 1781.Hon. Charles Morris: A Lay. Chief Justice

== Family ==
=== Spouses and children ===
Married, Boston, Mass., to Mary READ ca 1706–1782 with

- Charles Morris (1731–1802)
- John MORRIS 1736–
- William MORRIS 1737–
- Hezekiah MORRIS 1738–
- Mary MORISE 1742–1793
- Alexander MORRIS 1743–
- Frances MORRIS 1746–
- Samuel MORRIS 1748–
- James MORRIS 1750–
- Sarah MORRIS 1757–
- Hezekiah MORRIS

== Publications ==
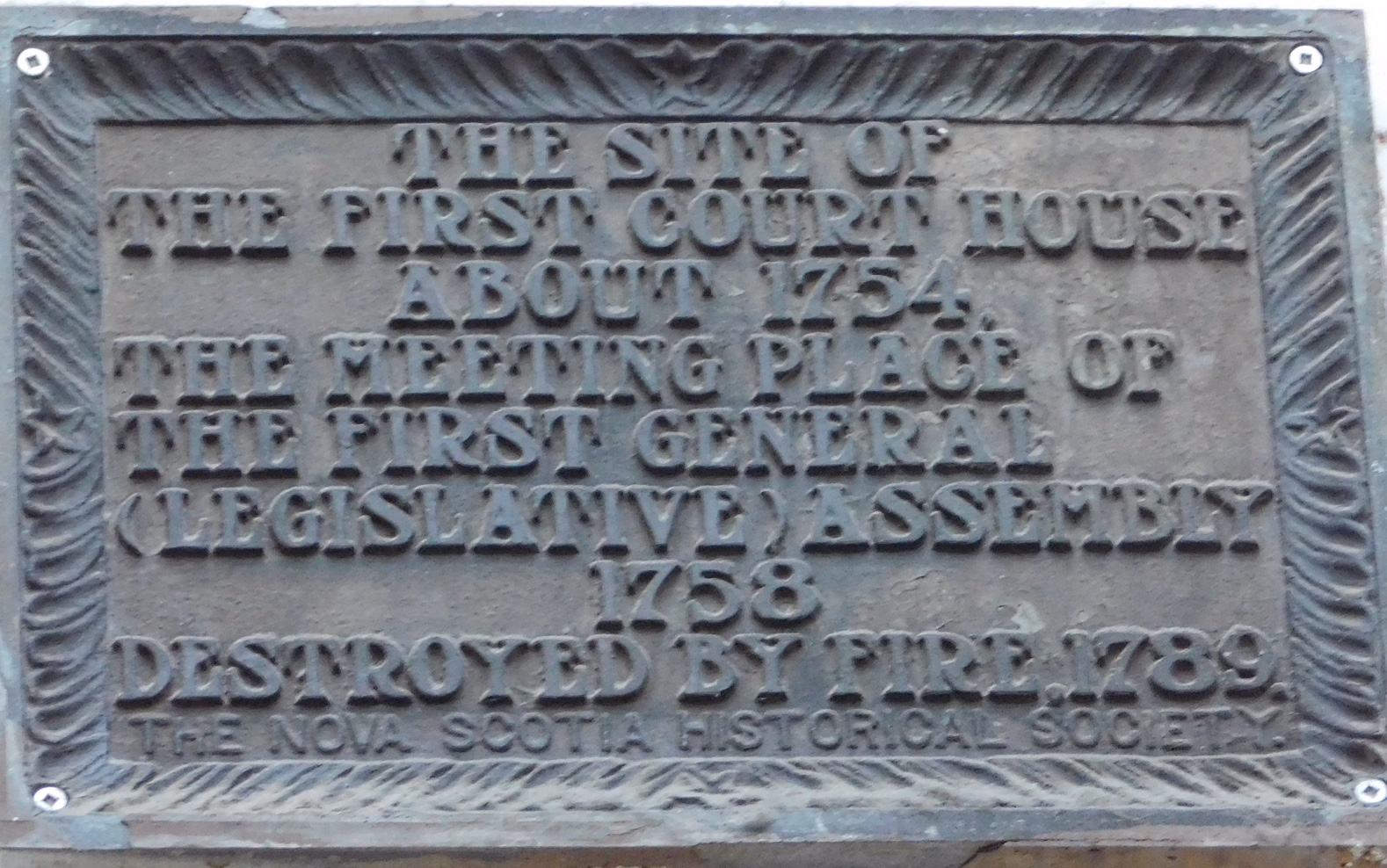
Site of First Court House Plaque, Royal Nova Scotia Historical Society, Scotia Square, Halifax, Nova Scotia

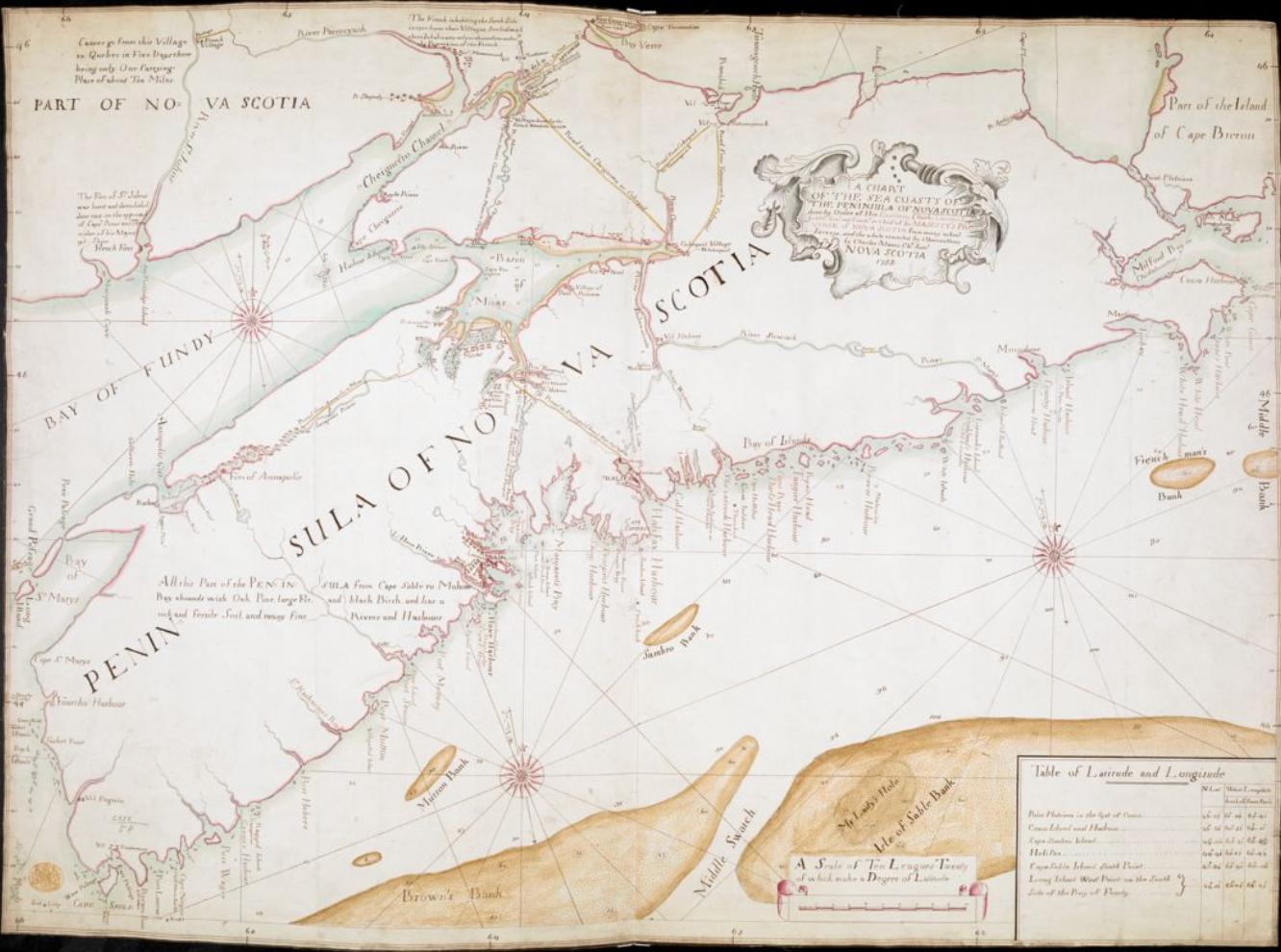
Charles Morris map. A CHART OF THE SEA COASTS OF THE PENINSULA OF NOVA SCOTIA, 1755

- Morris, Charles (1881) [1755]. "Judge Morris' remarks concerning the removal of the Acadians". Collections of the Nova Scotia Historical Society. II: 158–160.
- Morris, Charles (1964) [1764]. "Observations and remarks on the survey made by order of His Excellency according to the instructions of the 26th June last, on the eastern coasts of Nova Scotia and the western parts of the island of Cape Breton". PANS Report (Halifax): app.B, 20–28.
- Morris, Charles (April 1903) [1768]. "The St. John River: Description of the harbour and river of St. John's, in Nova Scotia, and of the Townships of Sunbury, Burton, Gage, and Conway, lying on said river . . . dated 25th Jan. 1768". Acadiensis. III (2): 120–128.
  - (originally printed as a four page pamphlet)
- Morris, Charles; Bulkeley, Richard (1933) [1763]. "State and condition of the province of Nova Scotia together with some observations &c, 29th October 1763". PANS Report: app.B, 21–27.
- Morris, Charles (1904) [1762]. "Description and State of the New Settlements in Nova Scotia in 1761". Report Concerning Canadian Archives for the Year 1904: Appendix F, 289–300.
- Morris, Charles (1912) [1749]. "Report by Captain Morris to Governor Shirley Upon His Survey of Lands in Nova Scotia Available for Protestant Settlers, 1749". Report of the Work of the Archives Branch for the Year 1912: Appendix H, 79–83.

== Legacy ==
- namesake of Morris Street, Halifax
- namesake of Fort Morris (Nova Scotia)
- Morris House (Halifax) which his son purchased and where he lived is the oldest wooden residence in Halifax

== See also ==
- Military history of Nova Scotia
- List of cartographers

Government offices
New office	Surveyor General of Nova Scotia; 1748–1781	Succeeded by Charles Morris (1731–1802)
