= Timothy Hierlihy =

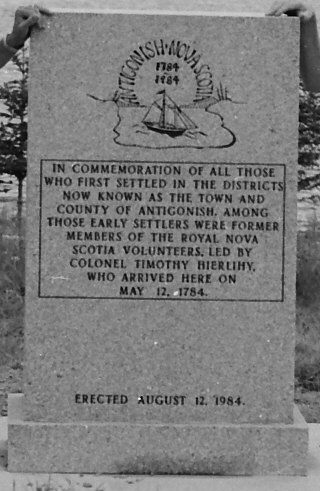
Timothy Hierlihy Monument, Antigonish, Nova Scotia

Timothy Hierlihy (Heirlehy, Hirolyhy, Hierlehey) (1734–1797) was a British officer who protected the British coal mines at Sydney Mines, Nova Scotia from attacks by American privateers. He also was the first British settler of Antigonish, known as the "founder of Antigonish." Hierlehy also became the commander of the Royal Nova Scotia Volunteer Regiment.

== French and Indian War ==
Timothy Hierlihy was born in 1734, in Mallow, County Cork, Ireland. At age 19, he arrived in Connecticut (1753). He married Elizabeth Wetmore on May 10, 1755 in Christ Church, Middletown and they had 10 children.

During the French and Indian War, in 1755 he was in the Connecticut Regiment, under the command of Sir William Johnston, when he fought in the Battle of Lake George. In 1756, he was stationed at Fort Edward under the command of the Earl of Loudon and then in 1757 under the command of General Webb. In 1758, under the command of General Abercrombie he fought in the Battle of Ticonderoga. The following year, he fought again at Ticonderoga and Crown Point under Sir Jeffrey Amherst. In 1759 he fought in the siege of Oswego, taking of Fort William Augustus, Montreal and Canada. In 1761 he fought at Crown Point and then in 1762, he was at the capturing of Havana under the command of Earl of Albemarle. He became a major in General Phineas Lyman to capture the Spanish Caribbean Islands, the campaign that concluded the war.

== American Revolution ==
During the American Revolution, Major Hierlihy lived in Middletown, Connecticut. His friend Montfort Browne had been taken prisoner on New Providence by Commodore Esek Hopkins of the Continental Navy on 3 March 1776. While Montfort Browne was imprisoned in Middletown, Hierlihy raised the Prince of Wales’ American Regiment in Long Island (July 1776). (Hierlihy and Browne knew each other previously in the province of West Florida, when Hierlihy was with the "Company of Military Adventurers," and the Browne was the lieutenant governor.)

In September 1776, while Browne was imprisoned, Hierlihy risked his life to deliver the plan to raise the regiment to the Commander in Chief Howe. According to Hierlihy's account, the route included crossing Long Island Sound “in the dead of Night, Twenty Six Miles wide in a little open leaky Boat, passing by a Rebel Battery (Fort Black Rock) of 23 Guns.” Howe was so impressed with Hierlihy’s plan that he immediately negotiated with George Washington to have Browne released from prison. While Hierlihy was raising the new regiment, the Patriots took his family members prisoner and kept them until the end of the war (six years).

In 1777, he created the Independent Companies (Hierlihy's Corps; 2nd Battalion, Prince of Wales American Volunteers). He was part of the expedition against Danbury, Connecticut, where they lost 130 men. He was later stationed with his own unit at Harlem Heights, Morrisania. (This unit laid the foundation of Antigonish, Nova Scotia.)

=== Nova Scotia theatre ===
On 7 April 1778, Major Hierlihy arrived in Halifax, Nova Scotia in command of his Independent Companies. He and his unit were on board HMS Hope and were sent to protect and work in the coalmines at Sydney Cape Breton. The miners were often soldiers. Sydney, Cape Breton provided a vital supply of coal for Halifax throughout the war. The British began developing the mining site at Sydney Mines in 1777, where American prisoners and newly arrived Loyalists were forced to work. On 14 May 1778, Major Hierlihy arrived at Cape Breton. While there, Hierlihy reported that he “beat off many piratical attacks, killed some and took other prisoners.”

While Hierlihy was in Cape Breton, two American privateers attacked St. Peter's, PEI. Hierlihy was ordered to go to Charlottetown and left with six vessels on Nov. 11. There was a storm and three of the ships were wrecked. Four officers and 35 privates were lost in the passage to PEI. One ship lost at Whitehead, with seven men drowned, and another was lost off Sable Island, where two soldiers drowned. All the crew (except 2) survived the winter stranded on Sable Island. In the spring, a few men were sent to Halifax and then a rescue operation began and the rest of the crew was transported to Halifax on April 7.

He eventually was posted to Halifax and became Lieutenant Colonel In 1782, Hierlihy’s Independent Companies were transferred to Halifax and merged with the Nova Scotia Volunteers to form the Royal Nova Scotia Volunteer Regiment.

== Post-War ==
After 6 years, in 1783, Major Hierlihy returned to New York where his wife and 10 children were released from prison. He returned to Nova Scotia and began command of the Royal Nova Scotia Volunteer Regiment. His wife Elizabeth died in Halifax on 2 April 1784. On their passage to Antigonish eight days later, Hierlihy’s oldest daughter died. (She is the first British person buried in Antigonish.)

He fought alongside John Small in the French and Indian War. John Small supported his application for a land settlement in Nova Scotia. He died at age 63 on 19 Sepatember 1797, and was buried in Antigonish.

== See also ==
- Nova Scotia in the American Revolution

== Primary sources ==
- "The Memorial of Lieut. Colonel Timothy Hierlihy" 20 May 1783. Great Britain, Public Record Office (PRO), Headquarters Papers of the British Army in America, PRO 30/5/10106.
- "The Memorial of Timothy Hierlihy, Major Commandant of His Majesty's Independent Companies" 27 August 1779. PRO, Colonial Office, Class 226, Volume 7, folios 42–44.
- Public Records of the Colony of Connecticut, 1636–1776 – Regimental Records
