= Charles Morris (1731–1802) =

Canadian politician

Charles Morris (December 31, 1731 – January 26, 1802) was a surveyor, judge and political figure in Nova Scotia. He represented Kings County from 1761 to 1770 and Sunbury County from 1770 to 1784 in the Legislative Assembly of Nova Scotia.

== Early years ==
He was born in Hopkinton, Massachusetts, the son of Charles Morris (1711-81) and Mary Read. Morris married Elizabeth Bond Leggett and came to Nova Scotia in 1760. From then until 1781, he assisted his father who held the post of surveyor general for Nova Scotia.

== Career ==
After his father's death in that year, he took over the duties of surveyor general. According to the Book of Negroes, Charles Morris purchased two slaves in 1783. Morris was also registrar for the Vice-Admiralty Court from 1781 to 1802, registrar of wills and probate from 1792 to 1798 and surrogate general for the Probate Court from 1798 to 1802. He also served as a justice of the peace. Morris was named to the Nova Scotia Council in 1785.

== Death ==
He died in Halifax at the age of 70.

His son Charles Morris (1759-1831) succeeded him as surveyor general.

Government offices
Preceded by Charles Morris (1711-1781)	Surveyor General of Nova Scotia; 1781–1802	Succeeded by Charles Morris (1759–1831)
