= Edward Y. Hartshorne =

American education officer

Edward Yarnall Hartshorne, Jr. (name pronounced Heart's horn: April 10, 1912 – August 30, 1946 in Germany) was the principal education officer in the American Military Government responsible for the reopening of the German universities in the U.S. occupation zone after World War II.

== Harvard sociologist ==
For his doctoral thesis on German Universities under National Socialism Edward Hartshorne had been traveling through Germany in 1935–36. On his return he became an entry-level instructor at Harvard University teaching sociology. In 1938 he joined other Harvard scientists in gathering numerous personal accounts from refugees who had escaped from Nazi Germany. As a result, he argued publicly against isolationism. By the time Germany declared war on the United States in 1941 he had joined the newly created Office of Strategic Services as an analyst, but quickly changed to the Psychological Warfare Branch of the Office of War Information. He followed U.S. troops to Tunisia and Italy monitoring German radio and interrogating prisoners of war. By the beginning of 1945 he was attached to the Psychological Warfare Division of General Eisenhower's Supreme Headquarters.

== Inside Germany ==
In April 1945 he seized the chance of leading an investigative team into Germany searching for head of Nazi Party publishing Max Amann. On this assignment he also came to Marburg, where he realized his true calling would be to revive the German university system. He let himself be transferred to the Education and Religious Affairs Section of OMGUS (Office of Military Government, U.S. for Germany), usually simply called the Military Government. At first, he joined Major General Morrison C. Stayer on an inspection tour of medical schools in July 1945. These medical schools turned out to be the loophole for the conservation of German universities as a whole which according to standing orders should have been completely closed down.

Soon Hartshorne was recognized to be the most knowledgeable specialist on higher education in Germany. He was directly in charge of Heidelberg and Marburg. Using these two universities as test cases Hartshorne developed the standard operating procedure for the denazification and reopening of all seven universities in the U.S. zone, i.e. he had to select the ones capable of opening – Giessen was closed down in the process – and planned and supervised the process of opening. Moreover, he was also involved in shaping university policy in general. Before the local planning committees began to function he had to drive around the country never staying for more than four days at any one place. After the Land Greater Hesse had been proclaimed Hartshorne became in charge of higher education there (universities at Frankfurt, Giessen, and Marburg) in October. He also succeeded in convincing his wife to come to Germany. She arrived with their three children in June 1946.

== Early death ==
In the spring of 1946 reports had appeared of incomplete denazification of Bavarian universities in the U.S. press. General Lucius Clay sent Hartshorne to investigate. On this assignment he was shot in the evening of August 28 while driving north on the Autobahn to Nuremberg. Hartshorne never regained consciousness until he died two days later. The suspect was a 19-year-old German black market dealer who was later shot and killed by U.S. military police. In just fifteen months he had denazified and reopened the three German universities of Heidelberg, Marburg, and Frankfurt and had prepared the opening of all the other universities in the American zone but one.

Hartshorne's anti-Nazi convictions aroused the hostility of the US military government's Counter-Intelligence Corps, the CIC, which was smuggling Nazi war criminals out of Soviet-occupied Austria and eastern Europe to Italy and thence South America, to be questioned about their knowledge of the Soviets for use in the looming cold war. Informed of these activities, Hartshorne was outraged and passed on information about this "ratline" to Moscow. He had become a serious inconvenience to the CIC. On 28 August 1946, on the Munich-to-Erlangen autobahn, his car was overtaken by a Jeep, which suddenly slowed down in front of him, forcing him to overtake it in turn. As he passed, a single shot was fired from the jeep, hitting him in the head. He died two days later. The murderer was never identified.

== Bibliography ==
- Edward Y. Hartshorne: German Universities under National Socialism. Reprint AMS Press, New York 1981.
- Academic Proconsul. Harvard Sociologist Edward Y. Hartshorne and the Reopening of German Universities, 1945-1946. His Personal Account. Ed. James F. Tent. Wissenschaftlicher Verlag Trier, Trier/Germany 1998. ISBN 3-88476-321-0. (contains a long report to his superiors, his diary and personal letters to his wife)
