= Hartshorn (disambiguation) =

Hartshorn is the horn of a male red deer.

Hartshorn may also refer to:

- Hartshorn, Alberta, Canada
- Hartshorn, Missouri, U.S.
- Hartshorn Memorial College, Richmond, Virginia, U.S.
- Hartshorn Cemetery, near Delphos, Ohio
- Salt of Hartshorn, Ammonium bicarbonate

== People with the surname ==
- Charles P. Hartshorn (1833–1880), American architect
- Cora Hartshorn (1873–1958), American pioneer in the field of birth control
- David Hartshorn (born 1966), New Zealand cricketer
- Edwin Norman Hartshorn (1835–1901), American politician and educator from Ohio
- James Hartshorn (born 1997), New Zealand cricketer
- Katie-Jane Hartshorn (born 1994), Australian cricketer
- Larry Hartshorn (1933–2007), American gridiron football player
- Leon R. Hartshorn (1929–2015), religion professor and author
- Michael Hartshorn (1936–2017), British-born New Zealand organic chemist
- Vernon Hartshorn (1872–1931), Welsh trade unionist and Labour Party politician
- William Newton Hartshorn (1843–1920), a Baptist leader from the United States

== See also ==
- Hartshorne (disambiguation)
