= Lawrence Hartshorne Jr. =

Canadian politician

Lawrence Hartshorne (1786 – September 28, 1865) was a hardware merchant and political figure in Nova Scotia. He represented Halifax County in the Nova Scotia House of Assembly from 1825 to 1830.

He was the son of Lawrence Hartshorne and Elizabeth Ustick. In 1815, he married Mary Tremain. Hartshorne served as treasurer for Halifax town and county from 1838 to 1865. He died in Dartmouth.
