= John Parr (colonial governor) =

18th-century British Army general

Lieutenant-General John Parr
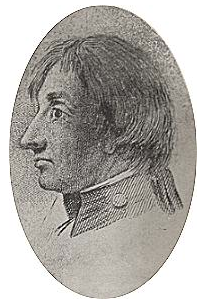
- John Parr

Governor of Nova Scotia
- In office 1783–1791
- Monarch: George III
- Preceded by: Francis Legge
- Succeeded by: Edmund Fanning

Personal details
- Born: 20 December 1725 Dublin, Kingdom of Ireland
- Died: 25 November 1791 (aged 65) Nova Scotia
- Resting place: Nova Scotia

Military service
- Allegiance: Kingdom of Great Britain
- Branch/service: British Army
- Years of service: 1730s–1776
- Rank: Lieutenant General
- Commands: 20th Foot; Royal Nova Scotia Volunteer Regiment
- Battles/wars: War of the Austrian Succession; Seven Years' War

John Parr (20 December 1725, Dublin, Kingdom of Ireland – 25 November 1791, Halifax, Nova Scotia) was a British military officer and governor of Nova Scotia. He was the last Governor of the Colony of Nova Scotia, and first Lieutenant Governor of the Province of Nova Scotia. He is buried in the crypt of St. Paul's Church.

== Early life and family ==
Parr was born in Dublin, Ireland, to Captain John Parr and Eleanor Clements, as part of the Anglo-Irish aristocracy that had settled on the island during the 17th century.

His mother Eleanor was the daughter of David Clements, of Rath Kenny, County Cavan, Ireland. His sister, Rachel Parr, married John Clements, who was the brother of Rt. Honorable Nathaniel Clements.

His father fought at the battle of the Boyne, and won distinction at Blenheim, Marlborough's greatest victory. Through his father's line, the family claimed direct descent from Lord Parr, Baron Kendal, who was a well-known nobleman, in the north of England, in the reign of Henry VIII, whose arms of their family are to be seen in the Parr Chapel of Kendal Church, Westmorland. The eldest son of this nobleman emigrated to Ireland and settled in 1620 at Belturbet, County Cavan.

In 1762, he married Sarah Walmsley, the second daughter of Richard Walmesley of "The Hall of Ince," Lancashire, and had five children, three sons and two daughters.

== Education and military service ==
John Parr's family was heavily involved in the English military, including his brother Colonel Peter Parr, who was Lieutenant-Governor of Fort George, Scotland.

He attended Trinity High School. At the age of 19, he joined the British Army's 20th Regiment of Foot as an ensign and saw service in the War of the Austrian Succession.

A subaltern officer, he was with the Prince William, Duke of Cumberland, whose army marched through Scotland against Charles Stuart's Jacobite rising at the Battle of Culloden in 1746.

In 1755, he became adjutant to James Wolfe, the colonel of the 20th Regiment of Foot. In 1759, during the Seven Years' War, he was wounded at the Battle of Minden and spent six months in hospital. He was then stationed at Gibraltar for six years and purchased the rank of lieutenant colonel. In 1776, he resigned his regiment and in 1778 he received a sinecure as major of the Tower of London.

== Governor of Nova Scotia ==
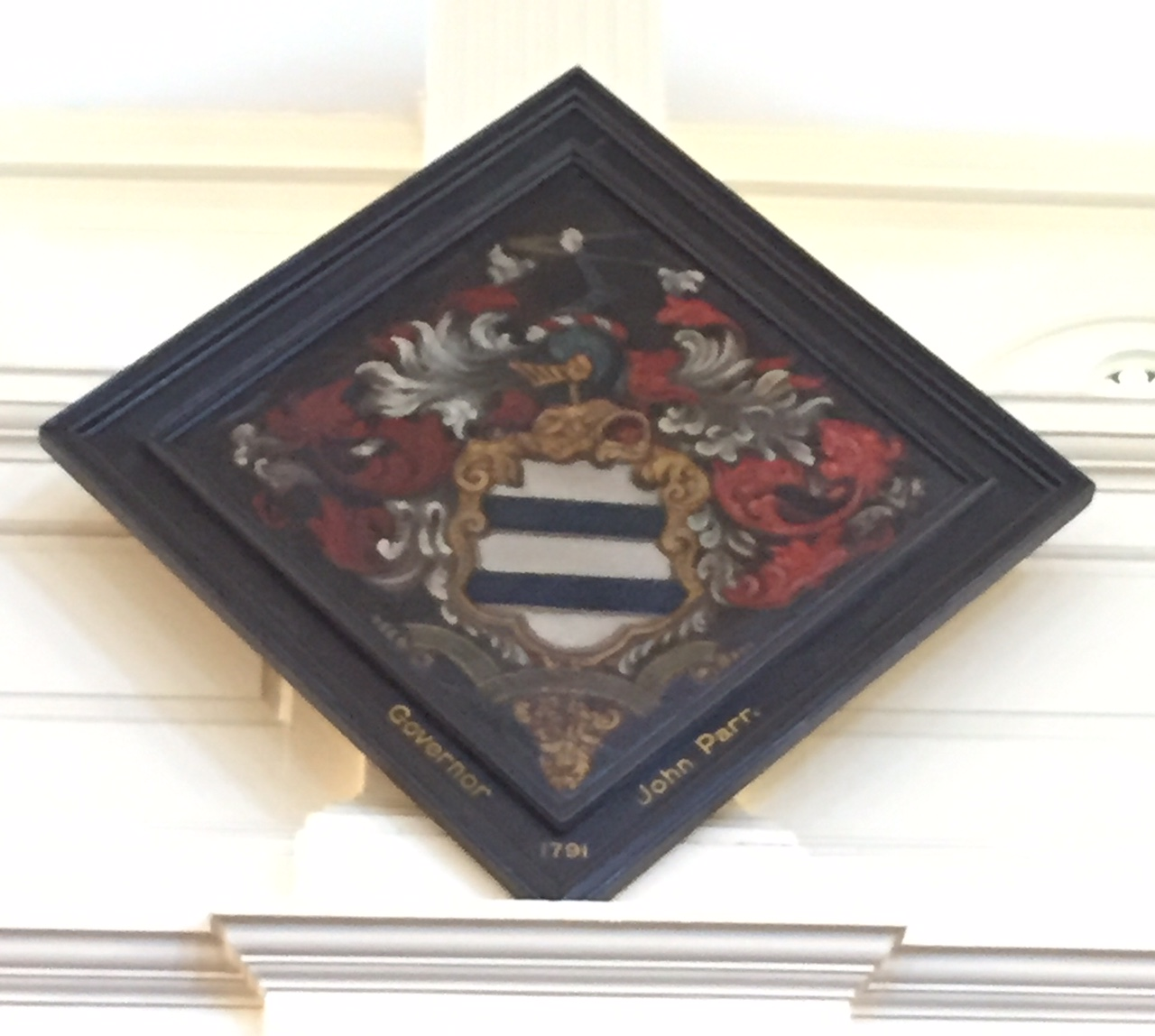
John Parr, hatchment, St. Paul's Church (Halifax), Nova Scotia

He was offered the position of Governor of Nova Scotia and took up his position as the American Revolutionary War was coming to an end and United Empire Loyalists were fleeing north to escape persecution.

Parr arrived in Halifax with his family on 5 October 1782. His predecessor, Francis Legge, had been an absentee governor for six years since he had been recalled to England, and the colony had been under the stewardship of a succession of military lieutenant-governors. The last of them was Sir Andrew Hamond, who had expected to be named governor himself. Angry at Parr's appointment, he resigned shortly after the new governor's arrival and returned to England. Edmund Fanning, a recently arrived Loyalist, was named Parr's new lieutenant-governor.

Parr immediately took over as colonel of the Royal Nova Scotia Volunteer Regiment.

In 1786, when the colonial administration of British North America was reorganized, Parr had hoped to be named to the new positions of Governor-General of The Canadas and Governor-in-Chief of British North America but was disappointed when the positions went to Guy Carleton who was also elevated to the peerage as Lord Dorchester. The position of governor of the Colony of Nova Scotia was then abolished, and Parr was reappointed as the first lieutenant governor of the Province of Nova Scotia, with his superior being Lord Dorchester.

Parr's administration oversaw the settlement of Black Nova Scotians, who were African-American Loyalists fleeing the United States. Parr was accused of "discriminatory practices and long delays" in the matter. He attempted to establish a whaling industry in Dartmouth (see Quaker Whaler House), and was embroiled in the "judges' affair" in which lawyers accused him of appointing incompetent or biased jurists to the bench.

Parr was under pressure to provide land and supplies for the new Loyalist settlers without bankrupting the treasury.

The British government was inundated with complaints about the difficulties the Loyalists were facing and Parr's allegedly-unsympathetic attitude towards them. The stress of the position may have taken a toll on his health since he died in office at the age of 66. He funeral, with full military honours, was presided by the 20th Foot. He was interred in Halifax's St. Paul's Church.

== Legacy ==
After him are named Parrsboro, Nova Scotia, and Parr Street, Saint Andrews, New Brunswick.

Political offices
Preceded by Francis Legge	Governor of Nova Scotia; 1783-1786 with Edmund Fanning (1783-1786)	Became a purely titular office held by the Governor-General of The Canadas
Preceded by Edmund Fanning	Lieutenant-Governor of Nova Scotia; 1786–1791	Succeeded by Richard Bulkeley (acting)
