= Francis Legge =

Canadian politician

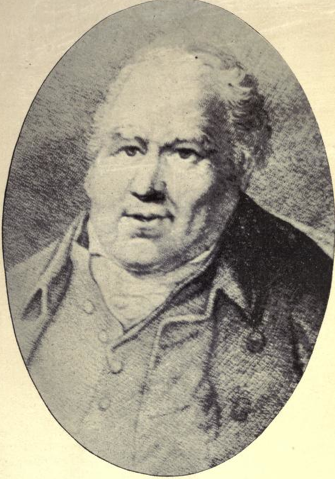
Francis Legge, the British royal governor of Nova Scotia, from 1772 to 1776, who during the American Revolution, formed the British Loyalist, military unit, the Royal Nova Scotia Volunteer Regiment, which served, as garrison troops, at a number of forts, in British Canada

Francis Legge (c. 1719 – 15 May 1783) was a British military officer and colonial official in Nova Scotia during the 18th century. He served as governor of Nova Scotia from 1772 to 1776. During the American Revolution, Legge raised the Royal Nova Scotia Volunteer Regiment.

Legge had served in the territory during the Seven Years' War "without distinction or promotion". However, Legge happened to be a relative of the Earl of Dartmouth.

Major Legge was appointed vice-roy of Nova Scotia by Colonial Secretary William Legge, 2nd Earl of Dartmouth in 1773. He arrived in Halifax on the Adamant on 6 October 1773 with orders to determine what were the financial difficulties in Nova Scotia and cure them. He proceeded to cut unnecessary expenses and tried to keep the province loyal to Britain. According to one account:

"[He] began to expose every scandalous detail of the spoils system which permeated Halifax and extended across the province. Even granting that he was an officer and a gentleman dealing with civilians whom he deemed socially his inferiors, he showed an alarming lack of imagination about how men behave when they are cornered and revealed almost none of the art of making himself agreeable to those whom he sought to influence or to work with. He had no gifts for the compromises with human frailty which alone can grease the wheels of politics".

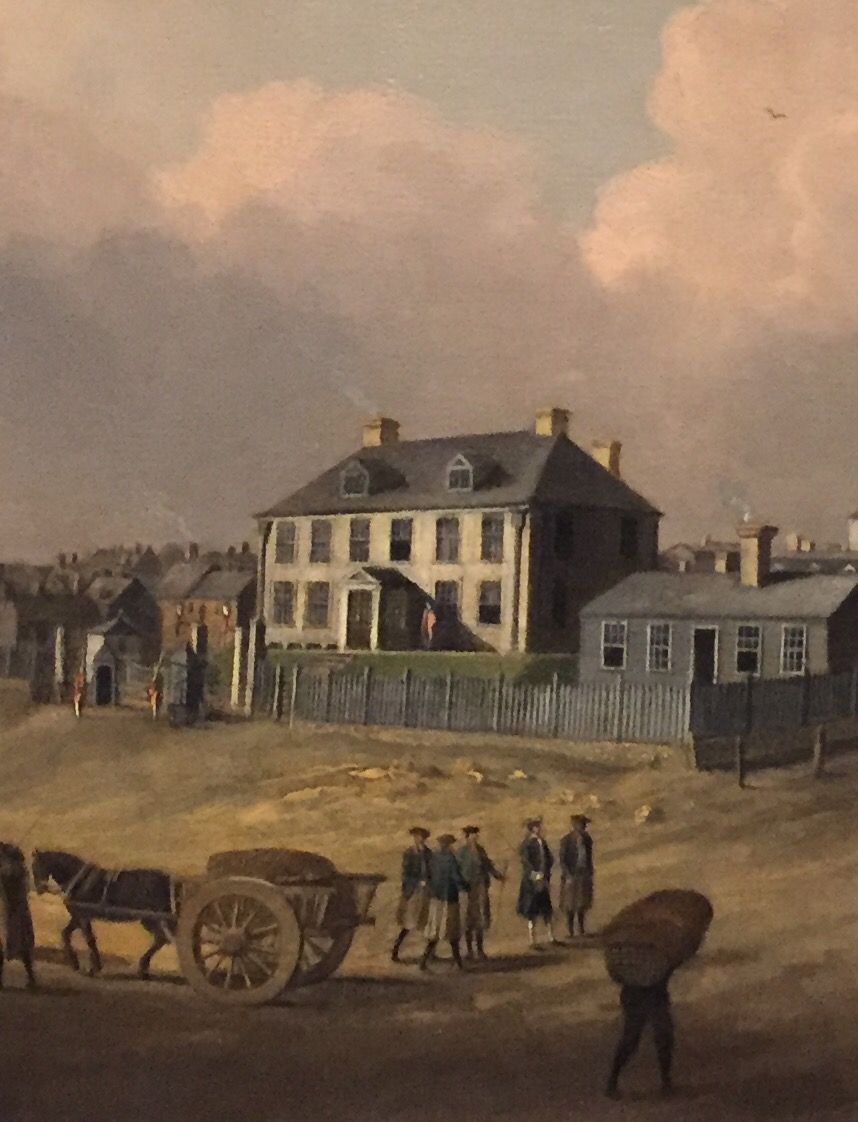
Governor Legge's residence (built 1749). (Located on the site of Province House, which still is furnished with his Nova Scotia Council table)

Legge's actions, particularly an attempt to audit the province's accounts, earned him a growing number of opponents among the local merchant oligarchy and turned both the Legislative Council and Legislative Assembly against him, and open rebellion broke out against Legge in the south of the province.

Legge was recalled to London in 1776 because of the complaints against him. The Board of Trade in London founding him "wanting" in "that Gracious and Conciliating Deportment which the delicacy of the times and the Tempers of Men under agitation & alarm more particularly demanded". The new Colonial Secretary, Lord George Germain, was concerned that "the Province will be lost, utterly lost" due to Legge's actions in alienating Nova Scotians and possibly losing the province to the rebellious colonies during the American Revolution. A decision was made to replace him with a more conciliatory administrator, Mariot Arbuthnot. Legge was not permitted to return to Nova Scotia but remained governor in name only until 1782. Rear Admiral Shuldham returned Legge to Plymouth onboard the Harriot Packet in Captain Tyringham Howe's convoy.

In 1775, Legge was granted permission to form the Royal Nova Scotia Volunteer Regiment of which he became the colonel. Because of his unpopularity, very few men were willing to be recruited, and the unit languished until the later years of the war. He remained colonel in absentia until 1782.

Political offices
Preceded by Lord William Campbell	Governor of Nova Scotia; 1773-1782 with Michael Francklin (1773-1776); Mariot Arbuthnot (1776-1778); Sir Richard Hughes (1778-1781); Sir Andrew Hamond (1781-1782)	Succeeded by John Parr
