= James Michael Freke Bulkeley =

Canadian politician

James Michael Freke Bulkeley (1761 – November 13, 1796) was a civil servant and political figure in Nova Scotia. He represented Sydney County from 1786 to 1793 and Halifax County from 1793 to 1796 in the Nova Scotia House of Assembly.

He was the son of Richard Bulkeley and Amy Rous. He succeeded his father as provincial secretary in the province's Council, serving from 1792 to 1796. Bulkeley died in office in Halifax.
