= John Butler Dight =

Canadian politician

John Butler Dight (Butler) (c. 1760 – July 2, 1854) was a merchant and political figure in Nova Scotia. He represented Cumberland County in the Nova Scotia House of Assembly from 1785 to 1793.

He was born in England, the son of Colonel Joshua Dight and Elizabeth Butler. and came to Nova Scotia in 1773. Dight served in the commissariat at Fort Cumberland. He later moved to Halifax where he established himself as a general merchant. He also served as a captain in the Halifax militia. In 1787, he married Ameliora Burgess Morden. In the 1790s, he changed his name to John Butler Butler when he inherited the estate of his uncle John Butler, a condition of the will. In 1792, he was named justice of the peace for Halifax County and, in 1804, he was named to the Nova Scotia Council. Butler served as a commissary in Wellington's army during the Peninsular War. He later settled in England but died at his property in Windsor, Nova Scotia during an extended visit to the province.
