= Bryan Finucane =

Irish-born lawyer, Chief Justice of Nova Scotia

Bryan Finucane (before 1744 – August 3, 1785) was an Irish-born lawyer who served as Chief Justice of Nova Scotia from 1778 to 1785.

The only Irish-born Chief Justice of Nova Scotia, Finucane was born in County Clare sometime before 1744. He studied law at the Middle Temple, before being called to the Irish bar in 1764.

After practicing in Dublin for several years, Finucane was appointed Chief Justice of Nova Scotia in December 1776, He did not arrive in Halifax until April 1778, and was sworn into office on May 1, 1778.
