= 5th General Assembly of Nova Scotia =

The 5th General Assembly of Nova Scotia represented Nova Scotia between May 1770 to 1784, its membership being set in the 1770 Nova Scotia general election.

The 5th General Assembly is known as Nova Scotia's "Long Parliament" as it sat for fourteen years, throughout the length of the rebellion of the thirteen colonies. William Nesbitt was chosen as speaker in 1770. Thomas Cochran became speaker in 1784 after Nesbitt's death.

A writ for the election of the 5th General Assembly of Nova Scotia was issued on 18 April 1770. The assembly convened on 6 June 1770, held seventeen sessions, and was dissolved on 20 October 1785.

It is known as the "Long Parliament" as it sat for fifteen years, throughout the length of the rebellion of the thirteen colonies.

Due to the extreme length of this assembly, there were a very large number of seats declared vacant and by-elections. The house journal sometimes makes note of the circumstances, oftentimes coloured by political rhetoric of the time.

== Sessions ==
Dates of specific sessions are under research.

== Governor and Council ==
According to Allison, page 481, in 1774, the composition of His Majesties government in Nova Scotia was:

- Governor: Lord William Campbell -absent 30 October 1771 – 13 July 1772.
  - Lieutenant Governor: Michael Francklin -absent 30 October 1771 – 30 June 1772, served as acting governor 30 June 1772 – 13 July 1772 during the absence of Gov. Campbell.
    - Administrator: Benjamin Green -served as acting governor 30 October 1771 – 30 June 1772 during the absence of both Gov. Campbell and Lt. Gov. Francklin.
- Governor: Francis Legge -named 8 October 1773.
  - Lieutenant Governor:
    - Michael Francklin -confirmed
    - Mariot Arbuthnot -named 27 April 1776
    - Sir Richard Hughes -named 17 August 1778
    - Sir Andrew Snape Hamond -named 31 July 1781
- Governor: John Parr -named 9 October 1782
  - Lieutenant Governor:
    - Sir Andrew Snape Hamond -confirmed
    - Edmund Fanning -named 23 September 1783

Note: this data is preliminary and is a work in progress. Many editors have gotten confused about the role of the Lt. Governor, and acting governor. They are not the same. Most but not all acting governors were Lt. Governors, and most but not all Lt. Governors served as acting governors for part or all of their terms. This section is subject to further research.

The members of the Council are currently under research.

The information below comes from an earlier version of this article and has not been verified:

In 1774, the composition of His Majesties government in Nova Scotia was:

Governor – His Excellency Francis Legge
Lieutenant-Governor – The Hon. Michael Francklin

His Majesty's Legislative Council (appointed by the Governor, may or may not be from House):

- Honorable Jonathan Belcher
- Charles Morris
- Honorable Richard Bulkeley
- Joseph Gerrish
- Henry Newton
- Jonathan Binney
- Joseph Gorham
- Arthur Gould
- John Butler

Provincial Officers (appointed by the Governor, may or may not be from House):

- Secretary of the Province – Honourable Richard Bulkeley
- Attorney General – William Nesbitt
- Treasurer – Benjamin Green
- Register – Arthur Goold
- Chief Surveyor of Lands – Charles Morris
- Provost Marshal – John Fenton
- Chief Receiver of His Majesty's Quit Rent – Joseph Woodmass
- Deputy Auditor – John Breynron

== House of Assembly ==
=== Officers ===
- Speaker of the House:
  - William Nesbitt of Halifax County -retired 7 November 1783.
    - Henry Denny Denson of Kings County -speaker pro tern from 20 October 1773 to 12 November 1773 (5th Session) during Nesbitt's illness.
  - Thomas Cochran of Liverpool Township -elected 1 November 1784.
- Clerk of the House:
  - Isaac Deschamps of Newport Township -appointed to Council
  - Richard Cunningham of Londonderry Township -elected 6 October 1783.

=== Division of seats ===
As in previous assemblies, there were 4 seats assigned to Halifax County, 2 seats to the other counties and to Halifax Township, and 1 seat to the other townships. There were 33 seats at the beginning of the assembly. During the assembly, Amherst and Windsor Townships, and Hants County were added, for a total of 37 seats.

=== Members ===
Electoral District	Name	First elected / previously elected	Notes
Amherst Township	William Freeman	1783	initial by-election 1783, took seat 22 October 1783.
Annapolis County	Phineas Lovett, Sr.	1770	seat declared vacant 10 December 1774, for non-attendance.
Annapolis County	Joseph Patten	1770	seat declared vacant 10 December 1774, for non-attendance.
Annapolis County	William Shaw (1775)	1775	by-election, took seat 12 June 1775, seat declared vacant 29 November 1784 for contempt of House (refusing to attend and produce public accounts)
Annapolis County	John Hall (1775)	1775	by-election, took seat 17 June 1775, seat declared vacant 28 June 1776 for non-attendance.
Annapolis County	Henry Evans (1776)	1776	by-election, return 20 August 1776, seat declared vacant 4 July 1782 for non-attendance, died 2 November 1782.
Annapolis County	John Ritchie (1783)	1783	by-election, took seat 8 October 1783
Annapolis Township	Obadiah Wheelock	1770	seat declared vacant 10 December 1774 for non-attendance.
Annapolis Township	Phineas Lovett, Jr. (1775)	1783	by-election, took seat 12 June 1775, seat declared vacant 26 November 1783 for non-attendance.
Annapolis Township	Stephen Delancey (1784)	1784	by-election, took seat 16 November 1784
Barrington Township	Richard Gibbons	1770	election declared invalid 19 June 1771.
Barrington Township	John Fillis (1772)	1772	by-election, took seat 11 June 1772
Cornwallis Township	Samuel Willoughby	1770	suspended 21 October 1774, to 8 December 1774, pending trial for usury. Seat declared vacant 28 June 1776 for non-attendance.
Cornwallis Township	John Chipman (1776)	1776	by-election, 14 August 1776, took seat 10 June 1777.
Cumberland County	John Huston	1770	seat declared vacant 10 December 1774 for non-attendance
Cumberland County	William Scurr (1775)	1775	by-election, took seat 12 June 1775, seat declared vacant 28 June 1776 for non-attendance.
Cumberland County	Thomas Dickson (1776)	1776	by-election 20 August 1776, took seat 20 June 1777, not in attendance 1783.
Cumberland County	Joshua Winslow	1770	seat declared vacant 8 July 1772 for non-attendance.
Cumberland County	Jotham Gay (1772)	1772	by-election 23 September 1772, seat declared vacant 10 December 1774 for non-attendance. Reelected, took seat 12 June 1775.
Cumberland Township	Jonathan Eddy	1770	seat declared vacant 20 July 1775 for non-attendance "afterwards turned Rebble"
Cumberland Township	John Allan (1775)	1775	by-election, took seat 30 October 1775, seat declared vacant 28 June 1776 for non-attendance.
Cumberland Township	Hezekiah King (1776)	1776	by-election 21 August 1776, seat declared vacant 4 July 1782. House journal states "The member elected several years ago has never attended."
Cumberland Township	Martin Gay (1783)	1783	by-election, took seat 14 October 1783
Falmouth Township	Isaac Deschamps	1761	elected for both Falmouth and Newport Townships, gave up this seat.
Falmouth Township	Edward York (1771)	1771	by-election, took seat 17 June 1771, seat declared vacant 20 July 1775 for non-attendance.
Falmouth Township	Jeremiah Northup (1775)	1775	by-election, took seat 24 October 1775.
Granville Township	John Harris	1770	died spring 1772.
Granville Township	Christopher Prince (1772)	1772	by-election, took seat 2 July 1772.
Halifax County	John Butler	1762	appointed to Council 20 November 1772.
Halifax County	John Philipps (1773)	1773	by-election, writ issued 16 February 1773, took seat 20 April 1773.
Halifax County	Robert Campbell	1770	died 3 January 1775.
Halifax County	James Brenton (1776)	1776	by-election, writ issued 26 February 1776, took seat 15 June 1776.
Halifax County	William Nesbitt	1758	retired 7 November 1783, with pension of £100 per annum.
Halifax County	William Abbott (1784)	1784	by-election, took seat 1 November 1784.
Halifax County	John Newton	1770	seat declared vacant 8 July 1772 for non-attendance.
Halifax County	William Howard South	1772	by-election, writ issued 14 July 1772, took seat 20 April 1773, died September 1777.
Halifax County	James Browne (1778)	1778	by-election, took seat 6 June 1778, left the province.
Halifax County	John George Pyke (1779)	1779	by-election, took seat 7 June 1779.
Halifax Township	Thomas Bridge	1770	attended, left province spring or summer 1781.
Halifax Township	Benjamin Green, Jr. (1782)	1782	by-election 28 February 1782, took seat 11 June 1782.
Halifax Township	Charles Procter	1765	died 21 December 1773.
Halifax Township	John Day (1774)	1774	by-election 25 August 1774, took seat 6 October 1774, died at sea 1775/6.
Halifax Township	Joseph Fairbanks (1776)	1776	by-election, return 20 April 1776, took seat 15 June 1776.
Hants County	George Brightman	1782	initial by-election, writ 4 July 1782, took seat 6 October 1783.
Hants County	Benjamin DeWolf	1782	initial by-election, writ July 1782, took seat 7 October 1783.
Horton Township	Charles Dickson	1768	seat declared vacant 28 June 1776 due to illness.
Horton Township	Joseph Pierce (1776)	1776	by-election, return 19 August 1776, took seat 16 June 1777, resigned 25 June 1778 due to age.
Horton Township	Thomas Caldwell (1779)	1779	by-election, return 28 January 1779, took seat 9 June 1779.
Kings County	Henry Denny Denson	1770	died 9 May 1780.
Kings County	John Whidden (1780)	1770	by-election, took seat 26 October 1780.
Kings County	Winckworth Tonge	1765	seat declared vacant 26 November 1783 for non-attendance.
Kings County	Jonathan Crane (1784)	1784	by-election, took seat 17 November 1784.
Liverpool Township	John Doggett	1770	died 20 March 1772.
Liverpool Township	Samuel Doggett (1772)	1772	by-election, 26 May 1772, sailed for West Indies 14 June 1772, seat reported vacant 8 July 1772 and 24 April 1773.
Liverpool Township	Seth Harding (1773)	1773	by-election, 2 July 1773, took seat 12 October 1773, seat declared vacant 10 December 1774 for non-attendance.
Liverpool Township	Thomas Cochran (1775)	1775	by-election, 3 July 1775, took seat 13 July 1775.
Londonderry Township	John Morrison	1770	seat declared vacant 8 July 1772 for non-attendance. Reelected, writ issued 21 January, returned 20 February 1773, took seat 1 November 1774. Left for New Hampshire 1777. House journal on 25 June 1778 reports "member has absconded and is gone out of the province."
Londonderry Township	John Cunningham (1779)	1779	by-election, took seat 7 June 1779.
Lunenburg County	Archibald Hinshelwood	1759	died 26 May 1773.
Lunenburg County	Otto William Schwartz (1773)	1773	by-election 5 November 1773, took seat 6 October 1774. Died 5 October 1785.
Lunenburg County	John Creighton	1770	named to Council 6 May 1775.
Lunenburg County	John Newton (1775)	1775	by-election, took seat 24 June 1775.
Lunenburg Township	Philip Augustus Knaut	1758	died 28 December 1781.
Lunenburg Township	Casper Wollenhaupt (1783)	1783	by-election, took seat 18 October 1783.
Newport Township	Isaac Deschamps	1770	appointed to Council, seat declared vacant 26 November 1783.
Newport Township	Joshua Sanford (1784)	1784	by-election, took seat 1 November 1784.
Onslow Township	Joshua Lamb	1770	seat declared vacant 8 July 1772, 6 October – 10 December 1774 for non-attendance.
Onslow Township	Richard Upham (1775)	1775	by-election, took seat 12 June 1775. Apparently died September 1775.
Onslow Township	Joshua Lamb (1775)	1770, 1775	by-election, writ issued 21 November 1775, return 17 February 1776, seat reported vacant 28 June 1776.
Onslow Township	Charles Dickson (1776)	1776	by-election, writ issued 17 July, return 6 August 1776, seat reported vacant 11 June 1777. (Elliott notes that in this period, the inhabitants of Onslow were refusing to take the Oath of Allegiance, and the vacancy may have been declared to deny representation.) Seat again declared vacant 4 July 1782 for non-attendance. Apparently reelected in another by-election, took seat again 27 October 1783.
Queens County	Simeon Perkins	1765	took seat 25 June 1771.
Queens County	William Smith	1765	died 24 June 1779.
Queens County	Nathaniel Freeman (1780)	1780	by-election, 20 April 1780, seat declared vacant 26 November 1783 for non-attendance.
Queens County	Benajah Collins (1784)	1784	by-election, took seat 17 November 1784.
Sackville Township	Robert Foster	1770	seat declared vacant 8 July 1772 for non-attendance.
Sackville Township	Samuel Rogers (1773)	1773	by-election, 6 November 1773, took seat 17 July 1775, seat declared vacant 28 June 1776 for non-attendance.
Sackville Township	Robert Foster (1776)	1776	by-election, writ issued 17 July 1776, return 22 August 1776, seat declared vacant 4 July 1782. House journal reports "member has absconded".
Sackville Township	Richard John Uniacke (1783)	1783	by-election, took seat 6 October 1783.
Sunbury County (Note: became part of New Brunswick in 1784)	Charles Morris	1761	took seat 29 June 1770.
Sunbury County	Israel Perley	1770	may have never sat, seat reported vacant 8 July 1772.
Sunbury County	James Simonds (1773)	1773	by-election, 28 June 1773, took seat 20 October 1774, seat declared vacant 4 July 1782 for non-attendance.
Sunbury County	William Davidson (1783)	1783	by-election, took seat 7 October 1783.
Truro Township	William Fisher	1770	may have never sat, seat declared vacant 8 July 1772 for non-attendance. Re-elected 4 February 1773, seat again declared vacant 10 December 1774 for non-attendance.
Truro Township	Samuel Archibald (1775)	1775	by-election, took seat 12 June 1775, denied seat 13 June 1777. (The inhabitants of Truro, Onslow and Londonderry were refusing to take the Oath of Allegiance.)
Truro Township	John Harris (1781)	1781	by-election, took seat 18 June 1781.
Windsor Township	George Deschamps	1782	initial by-election, took seat 14 June 1782.
Yarmouth Township	Malachy Salter	1766	elected in 1770, took seat 11 June 1772, election declared invalid 2 July 1772.
Yarmouth Township	John Crawley (1772)	1772	by-election 3 December 1772, may not have sat, seat declared vacant 10 December 1774 and 12 June 1775 for non-attendance.
Yarmouth Township	James Monk (1775)	1775	by-election, took seat 15 June 1775, seat declared vacant 28 June 1776 for non-attendance, went to Quebec.
Yarmouth Township	Richard Cunningham (1779)	1779	by-election, 12 April 1779, took seat 9 October 1780, appointed Clerk of the House and seat declared vacant 26 November 1783.

Note: Unless otherwise noted, members were elected at the general election, and took their seats at the convening of the assembly. By-elections are special elections held to fill specific vacancies. When a member is noted as having taking their seat on a certain date, but a by-election isn't noted, the member was elected at the general election but arrived late.

== Notes ==
Preceded by 4th General Assembly of Nova Scotia	General Assemblies of Nova Scotia; 1770–1784	Succeeded by 6th General Assembly of Nova Scotia
