= 3rd General Assembly of Nova Scotia =

A writ for the election of the 3rd General Assembly of Nova Scotia was issued on February 28, 1761. The assembly convened on July 1, 1761, held six sessions, and was dissolved on January 30, 1765.

== Sessions ==
Dates of specific sessions are under research.

== Governor and Council ==
- Administrator: Jonathan Belcher continued to serve as acting governor until named Lt. Gov.
- Governor: Henry Ellis named November 21, 1761, never served, Lt. Governors served in his name.
- Lieutenant Governor:
  - Jonathan Belcher named November 21, 1761
  - Montague Wilmot named 14 March 1763, arrived September 26, 1763
- Governor: Montague Wilmot named May 31, 1764
- Lieutenant Governor: vacant?

The members of the Council are currently under research.

== House of Assembly ==
=== Officers ===
- Speaker of the House: William Nesbitt of Halifax County
- Clerk of the House:
  - Archibald Hinshelwood of Lunenburg County to 1764.
  - Isaac Deschamps of Falmouth Township from 1764.

=== Division of seats ===
Cumberland County and Cumberland Township lost their 4 seats, and 6 new seats were created for Cornwallis, Falmouth and Liverpool Townships, for a total of 24 seats. Onslow and Truro Townships were granted 4 new seats for the second session, for a total of 28. Truro failed to elect its members.

=== Members ===
Electoral District	Name	First elected / previously elected	Notes
Annapolis County	Joseph Woodmass	1761	
Annapolis County	John Steele	1761	seat declared vacant May 4, 1762 due to death.
Annapolis County	John Harris (1762)	1762	by-election May 6, 1762, took seat June 7, 1762.
Annapolis Township	Joseph Winniett	1761	took seat June 7, 1762.
Annapolis Township	Thomas Day	1761	
Cornwallis Township	Samuel Willoughby	1761	might not have served. Seat declared vacant April 26, 1762 for non-attendance.
Cornwallis Township	Stephen West	1761	attended, but seat declared vacant April 3, 1764 due to illness.
Cumberland County	not represented		
Cumberland Township	not represented		
Falmouth Township	Henry Denny Denson	1761	
Falmouth Township	Isaac Deschamps	1761	
Halifax County	William Nesbitt	1758	
Halifax County	Michael Francklin	1759	seat declared vacant May 4, 1762, appointed to Council.
Halifax County	John Butler (1762)	1762	by-election May 6, 1762, took seat June 7, 1762.
Halifax Township	Malachy Salter	1758	
Halifax Township	John Burbidge	1758	
Halifax Township	Jonathan Binney	1758	
Halifax Township	William Best	1758, 1761	
Horton Township	William Welch	1761	
Horton Township	Lebbeus Harris	1761	
Kings County	Robert Denison	1761	resigned April 3, 1764 due to old age.
Kings County	Charles Morris	1761	
Liverpool Township	Benjamin Gerrish	1758	
Liverpool Township	Nathan Tupper	1761	resigned April 3, 1764, unable to attend.
Lunenburg County	Archibald Hinshelwood	1759	
Lunenburg County	Joseph Pernette	1761	
Lunenburg Township	Sebastian Zouberbuhler	1759	appointed to Council October 19, 1763, seat declared vacant April 3, 1764.
Lunenburg Township	Philip Augustus Knaut	1758	
Onslow Township (Note: writ for first election August 12, 1761)	William Nevil Wolseley (1761)	1761	by-election September 7, 1761, took seat by March 24, 1762, seat declared vacant April 3, 1764 for leaving province.
Onslow Township	David Cutten	1761	by-election September 7, 1761, seat declared vacant April 3, 1764, never sat.
Truro Township	did not elect its two members		

Note: Unless otherwise noted, members were elected at the general election, and took their seats at the convening of the assembly. By-elections are special elections held to fill specific vacancies. When a member is noted as having taking their seat on a certain date, but a by-election isn't noted, the member was elected at the general election but arrived late.

== Notes ==
Preceded by 2nd General Assembly of Nova Scotia	General Assemblies of Nova Scotia; 1761–1765	Succeeded by 4th General Assembly of Nova Scotia
