= Robert Sanderson (Nova Scotia) =

Canadian politician

Robert Sanderson (January 16, 1696 – after 1761) was a merchant, ship owner and political figure in Nova Scotia. He was a member of the 1st General Assembly of Nova Scotia.

He was born in Boston, Massachusetts, the son of Robert Sanderson. In 1718, he married Ann Orne. He married Mary Masters in 1727. Sanderson was chosen as the first Speaker of the House of Assembly of Nova Scotia, serving from 1758 to August 1759. He was replaced by William Nesbitt for the second session. With Malachy Salter, he was owner of the privateer Lawrence, which operated during the Seven Years' War. He later left the province; Sanderson was in England in 1761 and appeared before the Board of Trade and Plantations, reporting on "irregularities in the administration of the government of Nova Scotia".
