= Mount Denson =

Community in Nova Scotia, Canada

- Location within Nova Scotia
- Coordinates: 45°02′47″N 64°09′33″W
- Country: Canada
- Province: Nova Scotia
- Municipality: West Hants
- Time zone: UTC-4 (AST)
  - Summer (DST): UTC-3 (ADT)
- Postal code: B0P 1P0
- Area code: 902
- GNBC Code: CBALP

Mount Denson is an unincorporated community in the Canadian province of Nova Scotia, located in West Hants Regional Municipality. The community is named after Mount Denson, the eighteenth-century estate of Henry Denny Denson.

The area first became known to Europeans in the sixteenth century as the river now known as the Avon appears on maps from this period. By 1686 Jean-Baptiste-Louis Franquelin's map of Acadia/Nova Scotia defines the area, showing the local tributaries flowing into the Avon River. One of these tributaries, the Cacaquit or modern day Halfway River, which now forms the northern boundary of the community, is indicated on the map. By 1680 Acadian farmers had migrated out of the Port Royal area and began settling the eastern end of the Annapolis Valley including the lands about Mount Denson, then known as Pisiquit. Census records indicate Etienne Rivet was one of the first settlers to establish a farm. He and his progeny farmed the nearby marshlands south of Mitchener's Point as well as those in the Cacaquit River valley. His son, Etienne, operated a mill on the Cacaquit near where the river meets the uplands, just beyond the southern boundary of today's town of Hantsport. By the 1690s Mount Denson was incorporated into the Acadian parish of Paroisse de Sainte Famille (established in 1698). When the Expulsion of the Acadians began in 1755 the area's male residents were detained at Fort Edward and later in the fall deported along with their families from the province.

After the deportation of the Acadians, Nova Scotia's fine farmlands in the Bay of Fundy region remained empty and in an effort to repopulate the country the British government offered the recently vacated lands in grant to Protestants who wished to move to the colony. In 1760, Henry Denson acquired for himself 4000 acres in the new township of Falmouth and acting for the government began distributing the remaining tracts of land to New England Planters. Many families living in Mount Denson today descend from these settlers, including mayor Troy Simpson and his family.
