= Attorney General Nesbitt =

Attorney General Nesbitt may refer to:

- Charles R. Nesbitt (1921–2007), Attorney General of Oklahoma
- William Nesbitt (Nova Scotia politician) (c. 1707–1784), Attorney General of the Colony of Nova Scotia
