= Folkers =

Folkers is a German surname. Notable people with the surname include:

- Karl August Folkers (1906–1997), American biochemist
- Lambert Folkers (died 1761), baker and politician
- Rich Folkers (born 1946) Major League Baseball pitcher
- Ulrich Folkers (1915–1943), German U-boat commander
