= Stephen West =

Stephen West may refer to:

- Stephen West (Maryland merchant) (1727–1790)
- Stephen West (Nova Scotia politician) (died 1771), American-born political figure in Nova Scotia
- Stephen West (designer), American knitter
- Stephen H. West (born 1944), sinologist, philologist, and translator
- Stephen C. West (born 1952), British biochemist and molecular biologist
- Stephen G. West (born 1946), American quantitative psychologist

== See also ==
- Steve West (disambiguation)
