= 5th Nova Scotia general election =

5th Nova Scotia general election may refer to:

- Nova Scotia general election, 1770, the 5th general election to take place in the Colony of Nova Scotia, for the 5th General Assembly of Nova Scotia, or
- 1882 Nova Scotia general election, the 27th overall general election for Nova Scotia, for the (due to a counting error in 1859) 28th Legislative Assembly of Nova Scotia, but considered the 5th general election for the Canadian province of Nova Scotia.
