= 3rd Nova Scotia general election =

The 3rd Nova Scotia general election may refer to:

- Nova Scotia general election, 1761, the 3rd general election to take place in the Colony of Nova Scotia, for the 3rd General Assembly of Nova Scotia
- 1874 Nova Scotia general election, the 25th overall general election for Nova Scotia, for the (due to a counting error in 1859) 26th Legislative Assembly of Nova Scotia, but considered the 3rd general election for the Canadian province of Nova Scotia
