= George Suckling =

Canadian politician

George Suckling was a lawyer who was appointed to be the first Chief Justice of the British Virgin Islands in 1776. Suckling's appointment was not popular in the islands, which were at the time a notorious haunt for the lawless and for those seeking to evade their creditors elsewhere. He also served as a member of the 1st General Assembly of Nova Scotia from 1758 to 1759 and was the first Attorney General in Quebec, serving under James Murray from 1764 to 1766, when he was removed from office.

He was in Halifax in 1752, where he practised law and also was a merchant in partnership with William Nesbitt. In 1759, Suckling married Frances Duport, his second wife. In Quebec, he also served as advocate general for the Court of Vice-Admiralty. He left the province in 1771.

Suckling's arrival in the Virgin Islands was successfully delayed by the Lieutenant Governor John Nugent, and Suckling did not, in the event, actually arrive in the territory until January 1778.

The machinations of the local population continued, and although the British Virgin Islands had been granted its own Legislative Assembly by the Governor of Leeward Islands by proclamation on 30 November 1773, and the Assembly first sat on 27 January 1774, it was not until ten years later, in 1783, that the Assembly would pass the Court Bill, forming a court in the territory.

Even then, Suckling was destined to be frustrated. Ultimately, he would leave the territory on 2 May 1788, without ever taking up his appointment and without ever having been paid, when his own funds run out.

Suckling's brief time in the British Virgin Islands provides a valuable historical insight into the British Virgin Islands at this formative time in the territory's history; his repeated letters both to the Governor-General in Antigua and to London provide some of the best records of what the islands were like at the time. Suckling, perhaps unsurprisingly, had remarkably little positive to say about the population over whom he was supposed to have sat in judgment.

== See also ==
- History of the British Virgin Islands
