= Hantsport =

- Community
- Seal
- Motto: "The Greater Avonport Area"
- Location of Hantsport, Nova Scotia
- Coordinates: 45°5′0″N 64°11′0″W
- Country: Canada
- Province: Nova Scotia
- Regional Municipality: West Hants Regional Municipality
- Founded: 1789
- Incorporated: April 25, 1895
- Dissolved: July 1, 2015

Government
  - Councilor: Robert (Bobbie) Zwicker
  - MLA: Chuck Porter (PC)
  - MP: Kody Blois (L)

Area
  - Total: 2.89 km^{2} (1.12 sq mi)

Population (2021)
  - Total: 1,542
  - Density: 532.8/km^{2} (1,380/sq mi)
- Time zone: UTC−04:00 (AST)
  - Summer (DST): UTC−03:00 (ADT)
- Postal code: B0P 1P0
- Area code: 902
- Telephone Exchange: 684
- Median Earnings*: $49,283
- NTS Map: 021H01
- GNBC Code: CBRNJ
- Website: hantsport.ca
- Median household income, 2005 ($) (all households)

Hantsport is an unincorporated community in the Canadian province of Nova Scotia, located in West Hants Regional Municipality. The community is situated at the western boundary between West Hants Regional Municipality and Kings County, along the west bank of the Avon River's tidal estuary. The community is best known for its former industries, including shipbuilding, a pulp mill, as well a marine terminal that once loaded gypsum, mined near Windsor. The community is the resting place of Victoria Cross recipient William Hall.

== History ==
The area around Hantsport was known to the Miꞌkmaq as Kakagwek meaning "place where meat is sliced and dried" and the town is still home to a small Miꞌkmaq community known as the Glooscap First Nation or Pesikitk. Although no Acadians are known to have lived on the lands within the boundary of Hantsport proper, the area was part of the Acadian parish of Paroisse de Sainte Famille (established in 1698). Etienne Rivet and his progeny farmed the nearby marshlands of the Halfway River (currently the boundary between the town and the community of Mount Denson, Nova Scotia) and his son, Etienne, operated a mill on the river near where the marshlands meet the uplands on the town's southern boundary.

After the Expulsion of the Acadians, the Acadian region of Piziquid was formed into the Township of Falmouth. These lands were granted to New England Planters, and officers of the British army. Colonel Henry Denny Denson, a retired British officer, was granted an extensive tract of land (Mount Denson), which included the lands lying north of the Halfway River and south of the Horton Township boundary. In 1789, after Denson's death, his consort and heir, Martha Whitfield, sold Lots Three & Four (the area of Hantsport) to an Edward Barker.

Edward Barker (born at Lowdham, Nottinghamshire, England, 1745) was a British soldier, having arrived in Halifax in 1769 as a member of the 59th Regiment of Foot. In the early 1770s he mustered out of the army and by 1774 was at Falmouth, having married Rebecca Chadwick (see note) of Newport, Rhode Island. He appears to have either worked on Abel Mitchener lands or rented farm lands until 1788 when he purchased land in Falmouth. A year later Barker purchased the Hantsport lots and soon thereafter moved his family to Hantsport. Barker's arrival marks the beginning of the settlement which was initially known as "Halfway River" being the point halfway between Grand-Pré and Windsor.

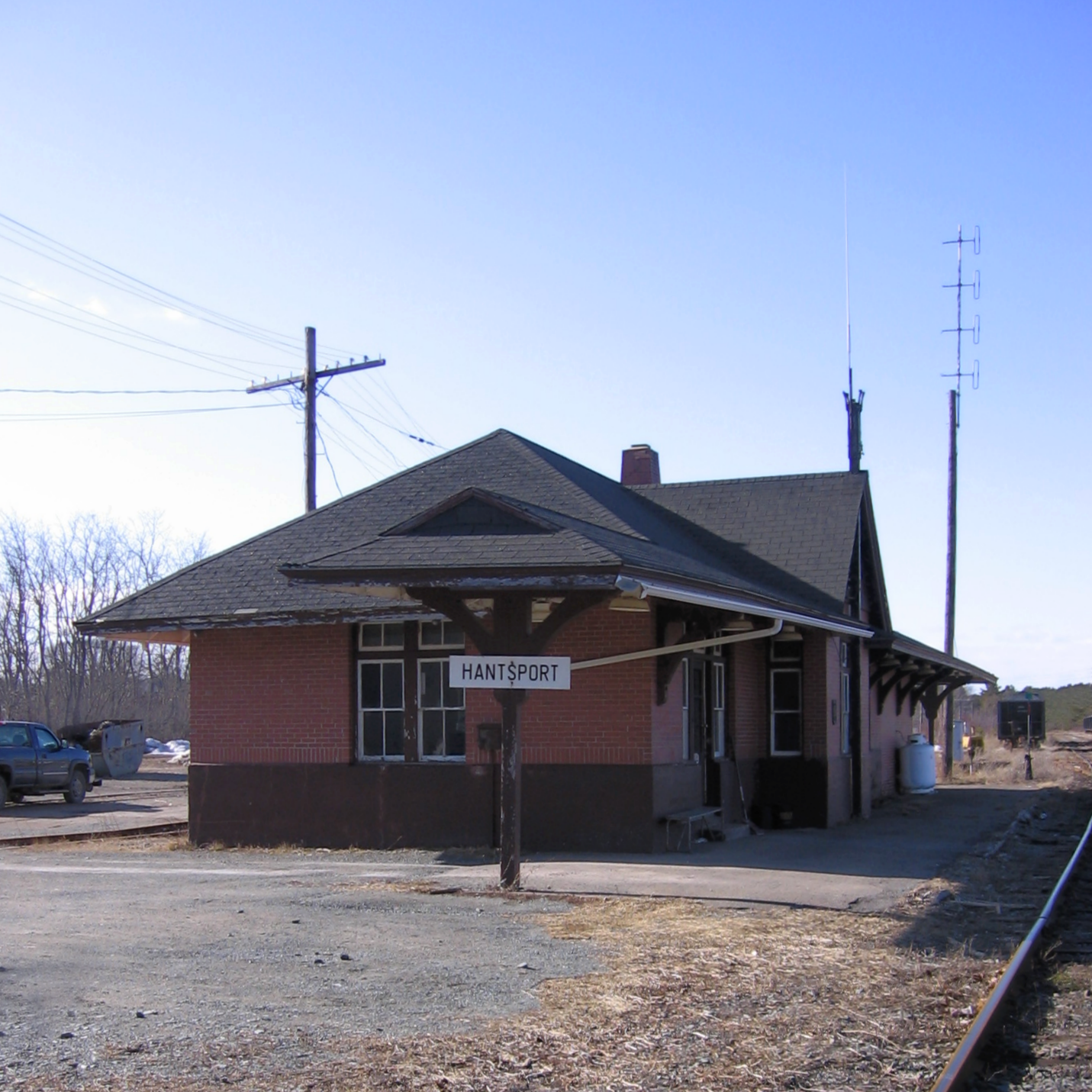
The Hantsport train station was built in the Craftsman style and is a registered heritage building. It is no longer in use as a passenger facility.

Shipbuilding (see Ezra Churchill) emerged as a major industry in the 19th century and the town produced a large number of wooden sailing vessels and some steam vessels before the decline of wooden shipbuilding in the late 1800s. Notable vessels included the barque Hamburg, the largest three masted barque ever built in Canada, and the barque Plymouth, famous for the diaries of Alice Coalfleet, who raised a family aboard her. Hantsport shipbuilders active to the very end of the age of sail in the late 19th century and also built tugs and one steamship before wooden shipbuilding collapsed in the early 1900s. William Hall, a Black Nova Scotian mariner born near Hantsport, was awarded the Victoria Cross in 1857 and is buried at a monument beside the Hantsport Baptist Church. Decorated American Civil War veteran Benjamin Jackson, was a commercial mariner who sailed out of Hantsport. Ben Jackson Road is named in his honour.

The arrival of the Windsor and Annapolis Railway in 1869 stimulated a number of local manufacturers which provided some relief from the demise of shipbuilding. A cluster of small factories and fruit warehouses grew around the Hantsport station. Gypsum exports emerged as a major employer in the 20th Century, followed by the pulp mill and paper factory of the Minas Basin Pulp and Power Company established by the Jodrey family in the 1920s.

Artifacts from the town's history are preserved at Churchill House, Hantsport, the restored mansion of the Churchill shipbuilding family (see Ezra Churchill) which serves as a community centre and museum.

During the 20th century, the port was used for shipping gypsum which was quarried at two locations east of Windsor and shipped to Hantsport using the Dominion Atlantic Railway, and later the Windsor and Hantsport Railway which ran frequent gypsum trains controlled by the Hantsport station. The marine terminal used a loader to move gypsum from the storage building to waiting ships and was one of the fastest ship-loaders in the world, necessitated by the fact that the extreme tides in the Minas Basin require ships to enter and leave the port within a four- to five-hour period. Operations at Fundy Gypsum Company's ship loading facility were idled in early 2011, with the facility permanently closed later in 2011.

On November 1, 2012, the Minas Basin Pulp & Power pulp mill, which had been in operation in Hantsport for more than 85 years, announced it would cease all operations. This mill closed in December 2012, resulting in the loss of 135 jobs. The largest remaining employer in Hantsport is CKF Inc., a paper products maker originally founded by the Joudreys to provide a local market for the Minas Basin pulp mill, produces Royal Chinet paper plates, as well as egg cartons, cup carriers and other molded pulp products at its plant on the community's waterfront.

In the wake of the closures of the marine terminal and the pulp mill, Hantsport town council voted on April 16, 2014, to dissolve its municipal incorporation. The town was formally dissolved into the Municipality of the District of West Hants effective July 1, 2015.

Sports have been a significant part of the atmosphere in Hantsport. The Hantsport Hawks junior high team won the regional banner in 2015 and they repeated in 2016. The Hantsport Shamrocks are one of the most well known baseball clubs in Nova Scotia. The Hantsport Bruins are a dynasty in the Hants County Hockey League, winning 8 Howard Dill Cups since 1998. Some say that sports in Hantsport are "the glue" that holds the town together. In the 2005-06 track and field season, Kira Pederson set the Hantsport Junior High 100 m dash record with a time of 13.34 s, which still holds to this day.

== Demographics ==
Historical population
Year	Pop.	±%
1956	1,298	—
1961	1,381	+6.4%
1981	1,395	+1.0%
1991	1,274	−8.7%
1996	1,252	−1.7%
2001	1,204	−3.8%
2006	1,191	−1.1%
2011	1,159	−2.7%
2016	1,560	+34.6%
2021	1,542	−1.2%
