= 1st Nova Scotia general election =

1st Nova Scotia general election may refer to:

- Nova Scotia general election, 1758, the 1st general election to take place in the Colony of Nova Scotia, for the 1st General Assembly of Nova Scotia
- 1867 Nova Scotia general election, the 23rd overall general election for Nova Scotia, for the (due to a counting error in 1859) 24th Legislative Assembly of Nova Scotia, but considered the 1st general election for the Canadian province of Nova Scotia
