= Hamburg (barque) =

Canadian sailing barque

Coordinates: 45°05′52.18″N 64°10′56.36″W

History

Canada
- Name: Hamburg
- Owner: Ezra Churchill & Sons (George and John Churchill), Hantsport, Nova Scotia
- Port of registry: Windsor, Nova Scotia
- Builder: E. Churchill & Sons Yard, John Fox Davidson, master builder, Hantsport
- Laid down: February 1886
- Launched: September 29, 1886
- Maiden voyage: New York to Liverpool, December 1886
- Out of service: Cut down to barge 1908. Hulked 1925.
- Identification: Code Letters KJHW
- Fate: Upper hull burned 1936

General characteristics
- Tonnage: 1743 Gross Tons
- Length: 216.2 ft (65.9 m)
- Beam: 43 ft (13 m)
- Depth: 24 ft.
- Decks: 1 deck plus orlop beams
- Propulsion: Sail
- Sail plan: Three Masted Barque

Hamburg was a three masted barque built in 1886 at Hantsport, Nova Scotia. She was the largest three masted barque ever built in Canada .

== Background ==
Hamburg was one of the last of over a hundred large sailing vessels built by the Churchill family of Hantsport, led by Ezra Churchill. The barque was named after Hamburg, Germany, continuing a Churchill family tradition of naming ships after ports where they often sought cargoes.

== Career ==
The barque's captain for almost her entire career was Andrew B. Coldwell. Hamburg worked mostly Atlantic trades but also made several long Pacific voyages, rounded Cape Horn many times and made one circumnavigation of the world in 1891. She called at her namesake port of Hamburg, Germany in 1895. She was converted to a gypsum barge in 1908 and served 17 years carrying gypsum under tow from the Minas Basin to New York. Her working career ended in 1925 when she was beached at Summerville, Hants County, Nova Scotia, just across and downriver from the site of her launch at Hantsport. In 1936, her massive wooden hull was burned to the waterline, leaving her lower hull partially covered and preserved in river silt.

== Legacy ==
Hamburg's surviving hull offers a rare surviving example of the structure of a wooden sailing ship from Canada's Golden Age of Sail. The vessel's history is presented at the nearby Avon River Shipbuilding Museum at Newport Landing and at the Churchill House Marine Memorial Room in Hantsport. A lower mast from Hamburg is preserved at the Age of Sail Heritage Centre in Port Greville, Nova Scotia while one of her massive iron bollards is on display at the Maritime Museum of the Atlantic in Halifax, Nova Scotia.
