= Steve West =

Steve or Steven West may refer to:

- Steve West (Canadian politician) (born 1943), former Alberta MLA
- Steve West (Kentucky politician) (born 1970), member of the Kentucky Senate
- Steve West (ice hockey) (born 1952), former ice hockey player
- Steve West (Danger Danger) (born 1964), drummer of the band Danger Danger
- Steve West (musician) (born 1966), drummer for the band Pavement and frontman of the band Marble Valley
- Steve West (darts player) (born 1975), English darts player
- Steve West (podiatrist) (born 1961), Vice Chancellor of the University of the West of England
- Steven L. West, American research scientist and rehabilitation counselor

== See also ==
- Stephen West (disambiguation)
