= Ephraim Gerrish Stannus =

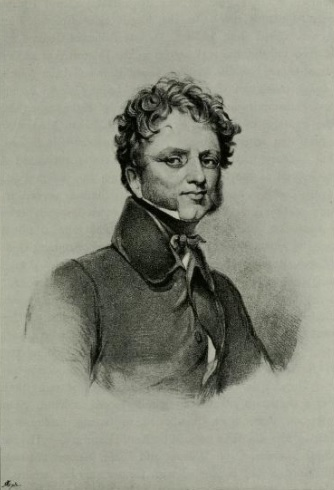
Sir Ephraim Stannus

Major-General Sir Ephraim Gerrish Stannus CB (1784 - 21 October 1850) was a British military officer in the service of the East India Company.

== Biography ==
Ephraim Gerrish Stannus was the second son of Ephraim Stannus of Comus, County Tyrone, and Susannah, daughter of Joseph Gerrish of Halifax, Nova Scotia. They were part of the wealthy Irish Stannus family about 1784. He went out to India as a cadet in 1799 and was commissioned as an ensign in the Bombay Army on 6 March 1800. He thereafter became lieutenant on 26 May, and was appointed to the European regiment in 1803.

He served in the Kathiawar campaign in 1807, and became captain on 6 July 1811. He distinguished himself in the Third Anglo-Maratha War of 1817–18, was promoted major on 8 Oct. 1818, and was private secretary to Mountstuart Elphinstone while governor of Madras between 1819–27. He was made lieutenant-colonel of the 9th native infantry on 31 Oct. 1822, C.B. on 23 July 1823, and colonel of the 10th native infantry on 5 June 1829.

From 1823 to 1826 he was first British Resident in the Persian Gulf at Bushehr. From this he was transferred to the 2nd European regiment. On 13 March 1834 he was appointed lieutenant-governor of the East India Company Military Seminary in Addiscombe, and knighted in 1837. He was promoted major-general on 28 June 1838.

Though just and kindly, he was no administrator, and was systematically irritated by the cadets into extraordinary explosions of wrath and violent language. Nonetheless notwithstanding his quickness of temper and his use of strong language, Stannus was a favourite with the cadets. He remained in charge at Addiscombe until his death of a heart attack in 1850.

He married Mary Louisa, widow of James Gordon but had no children.
