= Alexander Kedie =

Canadian politician

Alexander Kedie (c. 1709 – 1784) was a carpenter and political figure in Nova Scotia. He was a member of the 1st General Assembly of Nova Scotia.

He was born in Charing Cross, London, England and came to Halifax with Edward Cornwallis in 1749. Kedie moved to Lunenburg and then Mahone Bay. In 1769, he married Ursula Tanner, his second wife. He owned a sawmill.

His great grandson John Kedy also served in the Nova Scotia assembly.
