= Churchill House, Hantsport =

Municipal and Marine Museum in Nova Scotia, Canada

Coordinates: 45°03′52.5″N 64°10′39″W

Churchill House
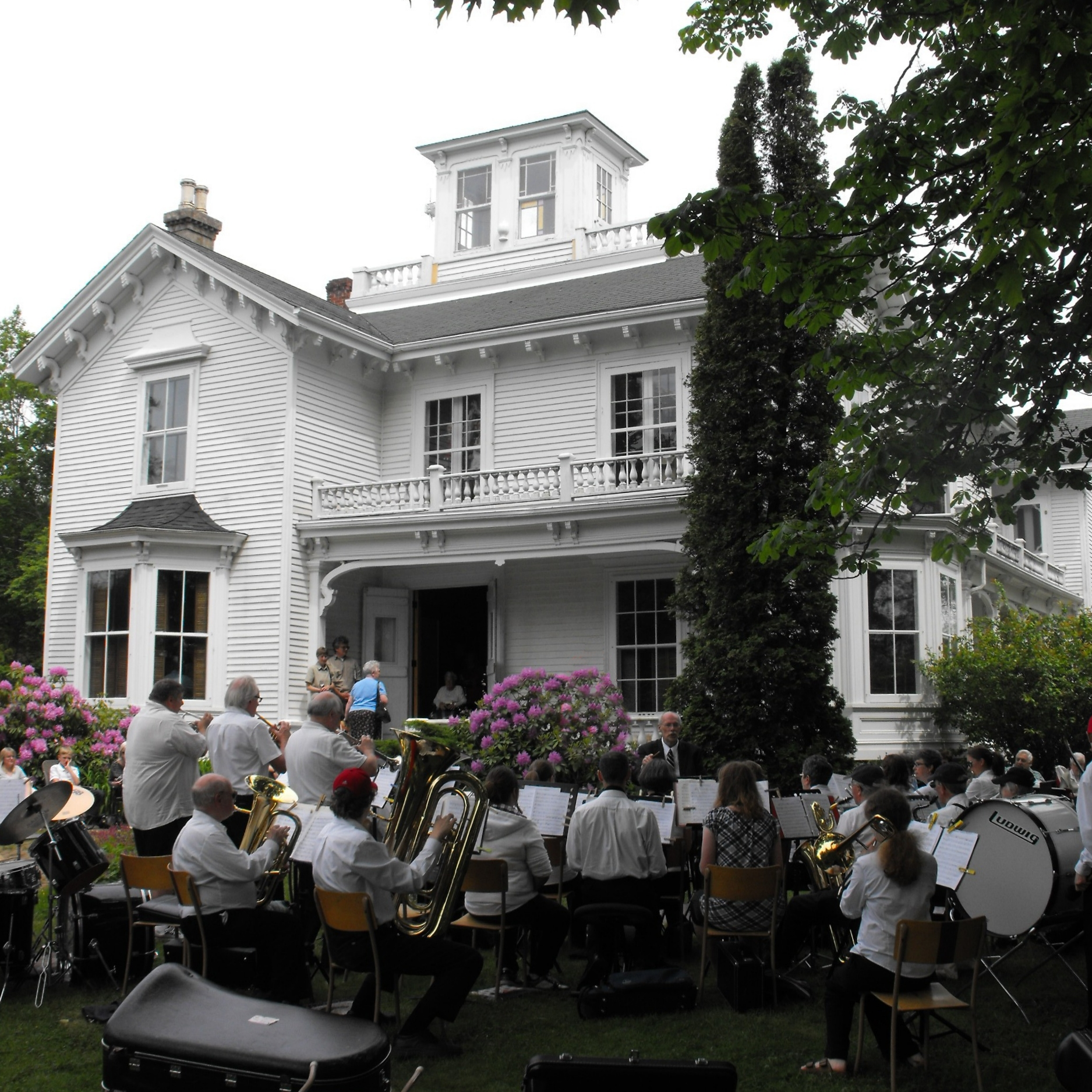
- Established: 1966
- Location: 6 Main Street, Hantsport, Nova Scotia Canada
- Type: Municipal and Marine Museum
- Website: www.hantsportnovascotia.com/history-of-hantsport.html Town of Hantsport

Churchill House is a historic house and community centre located in Hantsport, Nova Scotia. The house was built in 1860 by noted Hantsport shipbuilder Ezra Churchill as a gift for his son John Wiley Churchill. The well-preserved example of an Italianate house today serves as a museum and community centre owned by the non profit corporation Hantsport Memorial Community Centre.

== History of house ==
The Churchills were the owners of Hantsport, Nova Scotia's largest shipbuilding company, which built some of the largest ships in Nova Scotia, including the barque Hamburg, the largest three masted sailing barque ever built in Canada. Ezra and his wife Ann had 11 children, two of which were sons who both worked for their father in the shipbuilding industry.

The land of the Churchill House and Hantsport Memorial Community Centre grounds was sold by Ezra Churchill to his son John Wiley Churchill in September, 1866, for eight hundred dollars. The house was built about the same time as the Churchills' shipbuilding business in Hantsport took off and gained prominence. Once called The Cedars after the magnificent cedar trees on the property, the house was a fine example of Victorian architecture and the Shipping Era. John Churchill lived here with his wife Mary and two daughters, Violet and Laura, until his death.

The first floor of the house was restored in 1966 as a Canadian Centennial project; the two rooms upstairs were restored in 1978 and the master bedroom in 1999. The original colours and designs were matched for the restorations.
