= 1st General Assembly of Nova Scotia =

The General Assembly of Nova Scotia was established by a proclamation of the Governor in Council on May 20, 1758. A writ for the election of the 1st General Assembly of Nova Scotia was issued by May 22, returnable at the convening of the assembly on October 2, 1758. The assembly held two sessions, and was dissolved on August 13, 1759.

== Sessions ==
Dates of specific sessions are under research.

== Governor and Council ==
- Governor Charles Lawrence
- Lieutenant Governor vacant?

The members of the Council are currently under research.

== House of Assembly ==
=== Officers ===
- Speaker of the House
  - Robert Sanderson -left the province for England in 1759.
  - William Nesbitt elected August 1, 1759
- Clerk of the House David Lloyd

=== Division of seats ===
Since counties had not been established by this time, the proclamation called for the election of 4 members from Halifax Township, 2 members from Lunenburg Township, and 16 members from the province at large, for a total of 22 members.

The election was held using Block Voting. Each voter had to cast the maximum number of votes, whether 16, two or four.

Knaut and Kedie (or Kedy) represented Lunenburg Township, but the records do not distinguish the Halifax Township members from the at large members.

=== Members ===
Name	First elected	Notes
Joseph Gerrish	1758	
Robert Sanderson	1758	left the province for England in 1759.
Henry Newton	1758	
William Foye	1758	
William Nesbitt	1758	
Joseph Rundel	1758	
Jonathan Binney	1758	
Henry Ferguson	1758	
George Suckling	1758	
John Burbidge	1758	
Robert Campbell	1758	
William Pantree	1758	
Joseph Fairbanks	1758	
Philip Hammond	1758	
John Fillis	1758	
Lambert Folkers	1758	
Philip Augustus Knaut (Lunenburg Township)	1758	
William Best	1758	
Alexander Kedie (Lunenburg Township)	1758	
Malachy Salter	1758	took seat October 30, 1758.
Benjamin Gerrish	1758	might not have served, was out of the province by November 21, 1758.
John Anderson	1758	might not have served, was out of the province by November 21, 1758.
Archibald Hinshelwood (1759)	1759	by-election ordered on January 10, 1759 following declaration that the seats of Anderson and Gerrish were vacant, declared elected April 6, 1759 (receiving 264 out of total of 731 votes cast across the colony); election disputed by Richard Bowers, Hinshelwood quit his seat April 9. no record of the by-election for the second vacancy or of by-election to fill Hinshelwood's empty seat.

Note: Unless otherwise noted, members were elected at the general election, and took their seats at the convening of the assembly. By-elections are special elections held to fill specific vacancies. When a member is noted as having taken their seat on a certain date, but a by-election isn't noted, the member was elected at the general election but arrived late.

Preceded by No previous General Assembly	General Assemblies of Nova Scotia; 1758–1759	Succeeded by 2nd General Assembly of Nova Scotia
