= John Steele (Nova Scotia politician) =

Canadian politician

John Steele (died spring 1762) was a surgeon and political figure in Nova Scotia.

He came to Halifax with Edward Cornwallis in 1749 and moved to Annapolis around 1759, where he set up practice. It is recorded that, in 1752, Steele had several children over sixteen. In 1761, he was named a justice of the peace for Annapolis County.

He represented Annapolis County in the 3rd General Assembly of Nova Scotia from 1761 to 1762. His seat was declared vacant on May 4, 1762, due to his death.
