= John Kedy =

Canadian politician

John William Kedy (September 3, 1799 – October 7, 1874) was a farmer, sawmill owner and political figure in Nova Scotia. He represented Lunenburg township in the Legislative Assembly of Nova Scotia from 1847 to 1851 as a Reformer.

He was the son of John William Kedy and Catherine Ernst and the great grandson of Alexander Kedie who served in the first assembly for Nova Scotia. Kedy married Mary Catherine Acker. He died at Mahone Bay at the age of 75.
