= Henry Ferguson (politician) =

Canadian politician

Henry Ferguson (died 1791) was a baker, trader and political figure in Nova Scotia. He was a member of the 1st General Assembly of Nova Scotia.

In 1751, Ferguson was elected a deacon of the Dissenters/ Presbyterian Meeting House in Halifax, which later became St. Matthew's United Church (Halifax, Nova Scotia).

During Michaelmas Term, 1754, Ferguson was appointed a Surveyor (inspector) of Pickled Fish. He was elected to the General Assembly of Nova Scotia in 1758. In 1767, Ferguson was named a justice of the peace for Lunenburg County.

Ferguson died at his home in Halifax on 21 April 1791.
