= William Davidson (lumberman) =

Scottish-Canadian lumber merchant, shipbuilder and politician

William Davidson (1740 – 17 June 1790) was a Scottish-Canadian lumber merchant, shipbuilder and politician. He was the first permanent European settler on the Miramichi River in New Brunswick.

== Arrival in the New World ==
Davidson was born in Cowford, in the Parish of Bellie, Moray, Scotland, and was engaged in salmon fishing as a young man (see River Spey). He was born John Godsman, but changed his name to William Davidson after his grandfather. In 1765 he arrived in Nova Scotia and obtained extensive land grants of 100,000 acres (400 km^{2}) with his good friend, John Cort, of which 2/3 was Davidson's share. This amounted to a strip of 13 miles (21 km) on either side of the Miramichi River (then a part of Nova Scotia) with fishing and lumbering rights. He was required to clear and improve the land and establish one Protestant settler for every two acres (8,000 m^{2}). He settled many people on the Miramichi. Davidson is best known as the first settler in the Miramichi.

== Founding a colony ==
Davidson went to New England in 1766 to recruit settlers and supplies. Soon he was shipping fish to the West Indies and furs and fish to Europe. To employ his workers in the winter he began to cut lumber and brought out from Great Britain a master shipbuilder, shipwrights and other craftsmen.

Throughout his life this visionary, practical, industrious and intelligent man was plagued by bad luck. His first locally built ship, the Miramichi, sank off Spain on her maiden voyage and his second ship was wrecked in 1775 off the northern tip of Prince Edward Island. But, other cargoes got through and he soon had a seven-year contract with a British firm to supply fish and lumber.

== The American Revolution and the Saint John River ==
In 1776 the American Revolutionary War, came along and New England privateers made sailing in the North Atlantic unsafe and rebel sympathizers stirred up the neighbouring Mi'kmaq Indian nation. With shipping so hazardous, the British firm he contracted with was soon bankrupt.

The Mi'kmaq began raids on the Miramichi settlers, and in 1777 Davidson withdrew inland with his employees to Maugerville, a settlement on the Saint John River downstream from the site of present city of Fredericton, New Brunswick. Ever industrious, Davidson soon secured a contract to transport ship's masts and yards down the Saint John River to the port of Saint John for shipment to the Royal Navy.

In 1783 Davidson was elected a member of the 5th General Assembly of Nova Scotia for Sunbury County which, in 1784, became part of New Brunswick. He continued to serve for Northumberland County after the new province was established.

The American Revolutionary War was now over and Davidson moved back to the Miramichi Valley to secure his land grants. He went by ship with his employees and stopped en route at Halifax, Nova Scotia for supplies.

== Back to the Miramichi ==
Davidson lost no time on his return to the Miramichi. Most of his employees came with him. He spent 5,000 pounds sterling on a shipyard, a sawmill and stores and other buildings and was soon back in business. In the period 1783 to 1785 he lost several more vessels and their cargoes to the North Atlantic. But some got through and he signed a contract with Wm. Forsyth and Co. of Greenock, Scotland and Halifax, Nova Scotia to provide masts and yards. He also shipped fish to the West Indies and Europe.

To provide another source of revenue, Davidson sent out employees to fish for cod in the Gulf of St. Lawrence.

But United Empire Loyalists were pouring into the Maritime Provinces and in 1784 Loyalist settlers in the Saint John River Valley set up New Brunswick as a separate colony. They were land hungry and revoked Davidson's grant on the grounds that he had not brought out the settlers he promised. He was compensated with a grant of 14,500 acres (59 km^{2}), including the sites of his enterprises.

William Davidson was elected as representative from Northumberland County to the 1st New Brunswick Legislative Assembly and served from 1786 until his death.

Davidson was out on snowshoes on business in the winter of 1790, when he was caught in a blizzard. He suffered severely and caught a cold from which he did not recover. He died in June, 1790.

== Family and legacy ==
While he was living at Maugerville, Davidson married Sarah Nevers, daughter of Dr. Phineas Nevers. They had five children. He died on 17 June 1790.

== Portrait ==
A large portrait of William Davidson felling trees on the Miramichi hangs on an internal staircase of the Banff Springs Hotel in Banff, Alberta. This is very appropriate as Davidson was a native of Moray, very near the boundary with Banffshire, Scotland.

The painting has been in the possession of the hotel for many years, and hotel staff believe that it was painted in the last years of the 19th century. It identifies Davidson as Canada's first lumberman, surely a misnomer. He was, perhaps, the first English speaking person to establish a significant commercial lumber business in Canada. But long before, French settlers cut trees for their own use and for local markets.

== Acknowledgement ==
W. S. Spray's entry in the Dictionary of Canadian Biography Online (see link below) is one source used in the preparation of this entry.
