= Joseph Rundel =

Canadian politician

Joseph Rundel (died 1763) was a merchant, brewer and political figure in Nova Scotia. He was a member of the 1st General Assembly of Nova Scotia. His surname also appears as Rundle or Rundell.

He married Elizabeth Randel in Halifax in 1753. He was buried in Halifax on May 10, 1763.
