= Ezra Churchill =

Canadian politician (1804–1874)

The Honourable Ezra Churchill
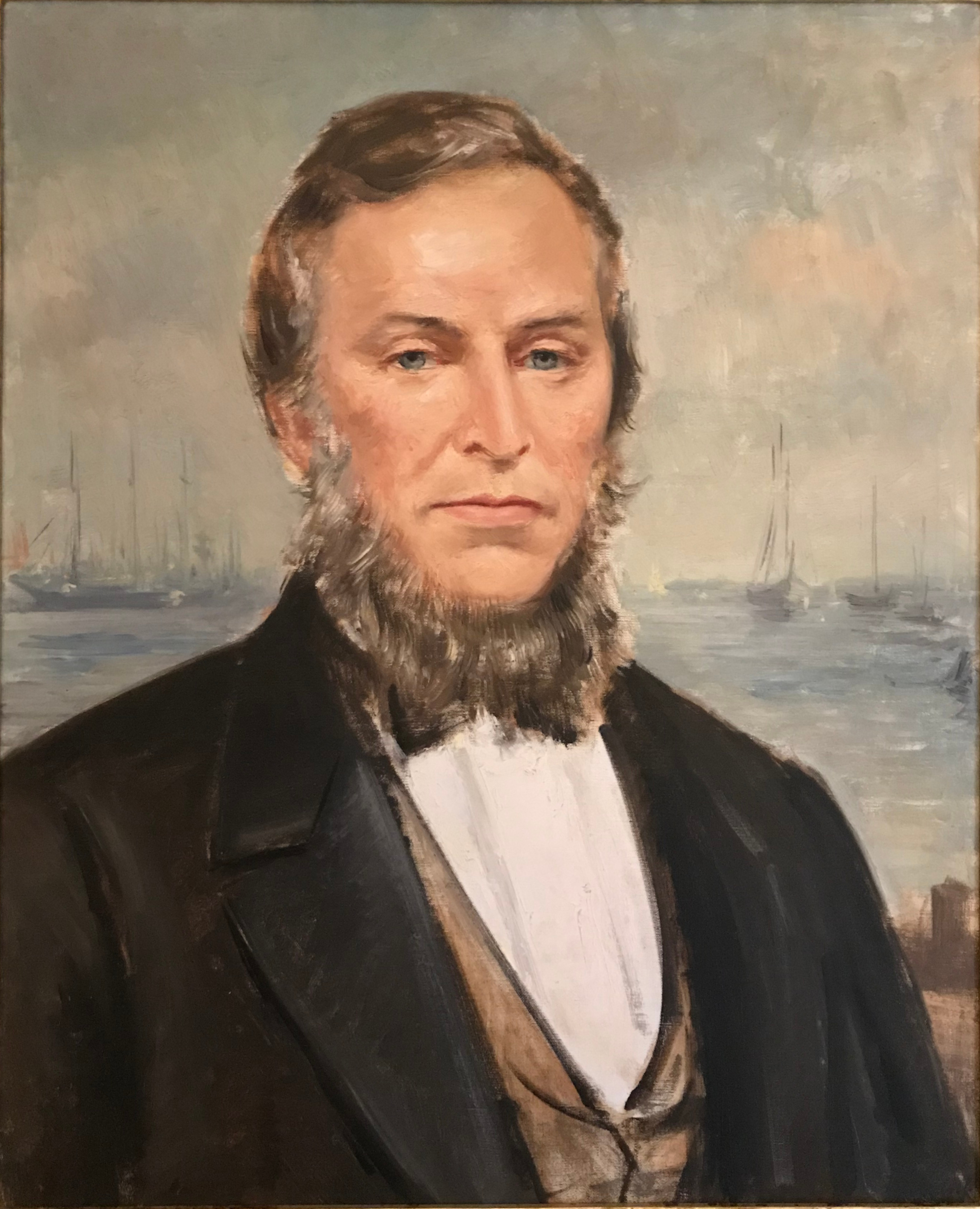

MLA for Falmouth Township
- In office 1855–1859
- Preceded by: None

MLA for Hants Co., North Division
- In office 1859–1867
- Preceded by: None
- Succeeded by: William D. Lawrence

Senator for Hants, Nova Scotia
- In office February 3, 1871 – May 8, 1874 - Died in office
- Appointed by: Sir John A Macdonald

Personal details
- Born: May 18, 1804 Yarmouth, Colony of Nova Scotia
- Died: May 8, 1874 (aged 69) Ottawa, Ontario, Canada
- Party: Liberal-Conservative, Conservative
- Spouses: Anna Eliza (Davidson) (m. 1824; death 1861) Rachel Alice (Burgess) (m. 1862)
- Relations: Judson Burpee Black (1842–1924) Son-in-law Black was married to Bessie, Churchill's daughter. Douglas Benjamin Woodworth (1841–1900) 3rd great-grandson Andrew Calder (b.1964)
- Children: 14, including George Washington Churchill, John Wiley Churchill, Elizabeth Woodworth, Rebecca Black
- Profession: Businessman, Shipbuilder, Politician

Ezra Churchill (May 18, 1804 – May 8, 1874) was a Canadian industrialist who became one of the most successful businessmen in Nova Scotia during the 19th century. As a politician, he held positions in the Nova Scotia legislature and was appointed a Canadian Senator for the Province of Nova Scotia. Churchill was also a Baptist lay preacher.

== Early life and Hantsport years ==
Ezra Churchill was born in Yarmouth, Nova Scotia, the son of Ezra Churchill and Elizabeth Trefry. In 1824, Churchill married Ann Davison and subsequently, after Ann's death, married Rachel Burgess.

His move to the eastern end of the Annapolis Valley came with the purchase of a sixty-six acre lot at Hantsport in 1841 from Robert Barker, son of Edward Baker, the founder of the town. He enlarged his landholdings in the area and over the years sold lots to workmen and their families who are moving to Hantsport for the jobs being created by the shipbuilding boom.

Although Hantsport and area had been the location of a number of shipbuilding ventures, Churchill was the catalyst that transformed a small gathering of farms along the confluence of the Halfway and Avon rivers into a major shipbuilding port. Nearly two hundred vessels were built in the Hantsport area shipyards. Churchill became one of the largest shipbuilders and ship investors in Nova Scotia, launching dozens of large sailing vessels from his yards at Hantsport, as well as from Parrsboro, Canning, Newport, etc. Amongst his many vessels was the barque Hamburg, the largest three-masted sailing barque ever built in Canada. Among the sailors who ran his ships was decorated African Nova Scotian veteran of the American Civil War, Benjamin Jackson.

Not to be content with ships, Ezra purchased timberlands and built sawmills, producing timber and planking for the construction of his ships and lumber for the export trade. With gypsum deposits located nearby in the Windsor area he invested in the development of mines. The production from his mills and mines certainly became cargos for the outbound sailing of some of his vessels. Owning and operating ships was a risky business and in 1851 he became a founding investor in the Avon Marine Insurance Company. In 1870 or 1871 he operated the Evangeline Hotel, one of five hotels in the booming town of Hantsport.

== Political life ==
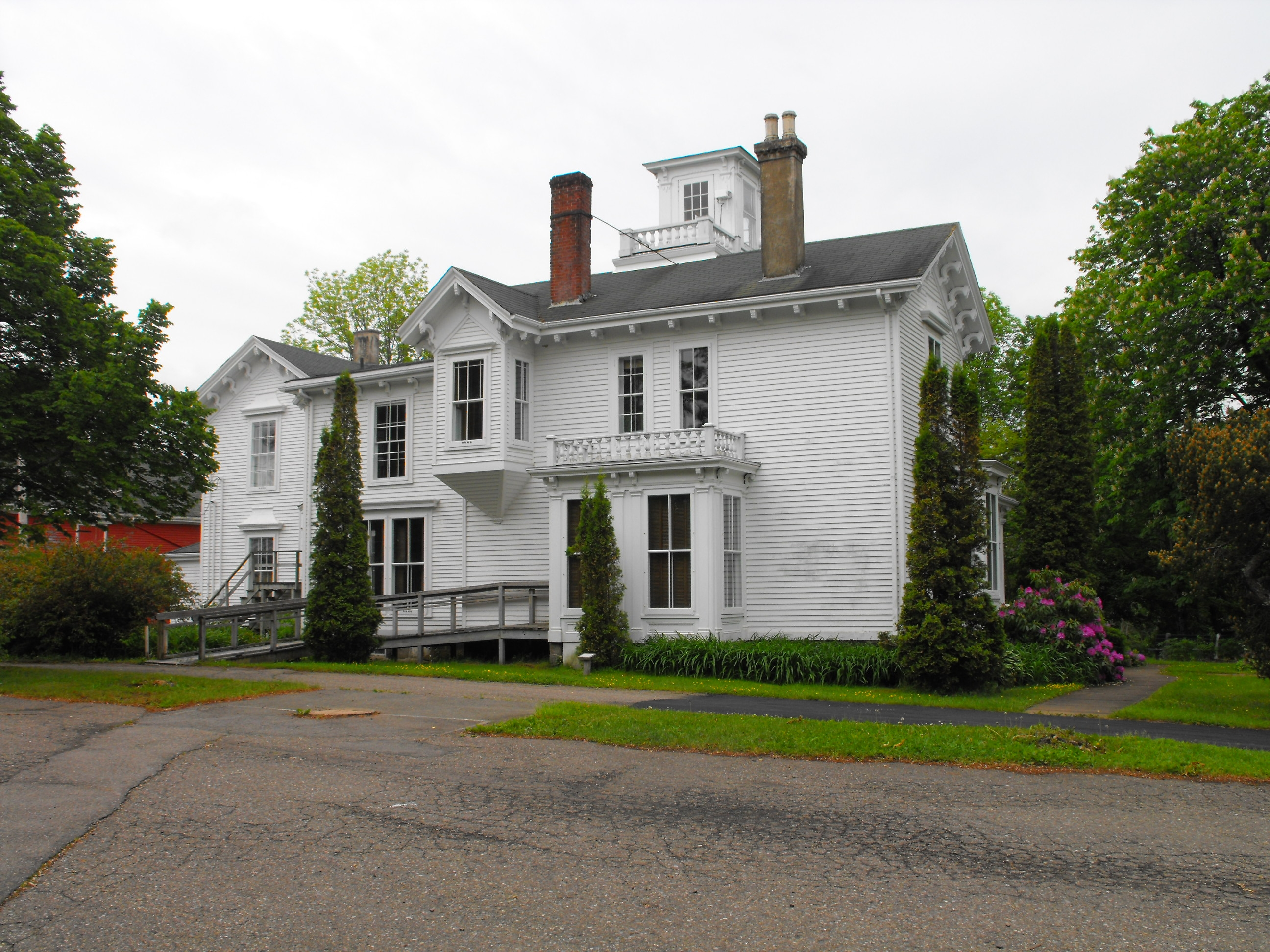
Churchill House, Hantsport

His political life began in 1855 when he was elected to represent Falmouth township in the Provincial Assembly holding his seat until the abolishment of the seat in 1859 when new electoral boundary districts were formed. Churchill won and held the new district, North Division of Hants County, from 1859 to 1867. During the debates over the idea of a Canadian confederation, Churchill remained pragmatic. During the contentious debates over the idea of confederation, a number of representatives broached the idea of annexation to the United States. To this Churchill is said to have stated "...what part of the States should we be annexed to - the North or the South? I always regretted that Halifax as well as New Brunswick, gave its sympathy to the South." He eventually backed the idea of a national confederation, supporting Joseph Howe's efforts for better terms before Nova Scotia's accepted Sir John A. Macdonald's plan. In light of his long service to Nova Scotia and to the young Canada, Churchill was appointed on February 3, 1871 to the Senate, representing the Liberal-Conservative Party.

== Later life and death ==
In 1871 Churchill and his wife moved to Windsor after purchasing Clifton House, the former property of the judge and writer, Thomas Chandler Haliburton.

Ezra Churchill was certainly a man of some note and power, so much so that he played host to HRH, Prince Edward, Prince of Wales (Edward VII) during his visits to Hantsport in 1860. The Prince's royal yacht Styx docked at Hantsport to transport him to and from New Brunswick. The new railway lines had only been completed to Windsor, therefore Churchill provided his personal carriages to the Prince and his party for the short journey to the railway terminus.

He died in office in Ottawa in 1874.

His daughter Elizabeth married Douglas Benjamin Woodworth. His daughter Bessie married Judson Burpee Black, Windsor, Nova Scotia.

Churchill built a large Italianate mansion in Hantsport for his son John Wiley Churchill which was known as "The Cedars". The house is preserved today as the Churchill House museum and community centre.
