= Sherman Hines =

Canadian photographer (born 1941)

Sherman Hines (born 1941) is a Canadian photographer, born in Liverpool, Nova Scotia.

== Photography ==
Hines first studied photography while in the Royal Canadian Air Force, where he received a diploma in photography, followed by four years of study at the Brooks Institute of Photography in Santa Barbara, California. In addition to taking and publishing photographs, Hines has lectured extensively on photography throughout Canada and the United States, including fourteen years at the West Coast School of Photography in California.

== Other activities ==
Hines has an interest in architecture that has had him purchase and restore historic buildings in Nova Scotia, one of which has been converted into a museum: the Rossignol Cultural Centre in Liverpool, which houses the Sherman Hines Museum of Photography.

The Sherman Hines Museum of Photography was housed in the former town hall of Liverpool from 1996 - 2014. Currently, it is housed at the Rossignol Cultural Centre. It has four galleries, one of which houses a permanent exhibit of photographs and artifacts of Hines, Yousuf Karsh, Wallace MacAskill, and William Notman. The other three galleries are used for temporary exhibits.

Established in 2002, the Rossignol Cultural Centre, located in Liverpool, is housed in a former high school that was to be demolished. The museum consists of five galleries, which includes an apothecary museum, a wildlife art gallery, folk and fine art, a hunting, fishing and guiding museum, a Mi’kmaq museum, a trapper’s cabin, and an outdoor cultural village.

The Rossignol Cultural Centre also includes a museum featuring another interest of Hines: outhouses. This museum is the only one of its kind in North America. Hines began photographing outhouses in the 1970s, said to have started when he was photographing the oldest remaining house in Mill Village, Nova Scotia which had an outhouse. Hines has published several books featuring outhouses and issues an annual outhouse calendar.

One of Hines's architectural finds was a mission and a fortification built in 1699 by the French in Avondale, Nova Scotia, constructed at the request of Abbé Jean-Louis Le Loutre. According to Hines's research, it is the oldest building in Canada east of Quebec City. Hines purchased the property, which was once owned by George Brightman, in 1982 for $15,000 and spent 30 years restoring the property. In 2012, Hines listed the property for sale for $2 million.

Hines is also an avid big game trophy hunter and he publishes photo books about trophy rooms.

== Honours ==
Hines has been granted a Fellowship in the American Society of Photographers and been named Canadian Photographer of the Year. He also has two gold medals of excellence in photography from The Institutes for the Achievement of Human Potential in Philadelphia and the National Association for Photographic Art. In May 1998, Saint Mary's University in Halifax granted Hines an Honorary Doctor of Letters.

== Personal life ==
His son Andy Hines is a music video maker. His work on "One Man Can Change the World" with American rapper Big Sean won the MTV Video Music Award for Best Video with a Social Message in 2015. His wife is Andrea.

== Publications ==
Hines has published more than 70 books (many of which were best sellers), his Extraordinary Light selling 43,000 copies, as well as other products such as calendars. Hines's published works include:

- Nova Scotia : the Lighthouse Route and the Annapolis Valley Oxford University Press (1979) ISBN 0195403193
- Newfoundland Pictorial Cookbook Nimbus Publishing (1984) ISBN 0921054432
- The North Nimbus Publishing (1984) ISBN 0921054335
- Extraordinary light: A vision of Canada Etue & Co. Inc./Stone House Pub. (1988) ISBN 0920197493
- Halifax Nimbus Publishing, Canada (1990) ISBN 0920852122
- Peggy's Cove Nimbus Publishing (1992) ISBN 1551090090
- The Outhouse Revisited (with Don Harron) Firefly Books (1996) ISBN 1552090620
- Evangeline Trail Nimbus Publishing (1997) ISBN 1551092034
- Panorama Nova Scotia Nimbus Publishing (1998) ISBN 1551092476
- Outhouses of the West Firefly Books (2000) ISBN 1552095231
- Mahone Bay Nimbus Publishing (2002) ISBN 1551093995
