= Hantsport station =

Railway station in Nova Scotia, Canada

Hantsport
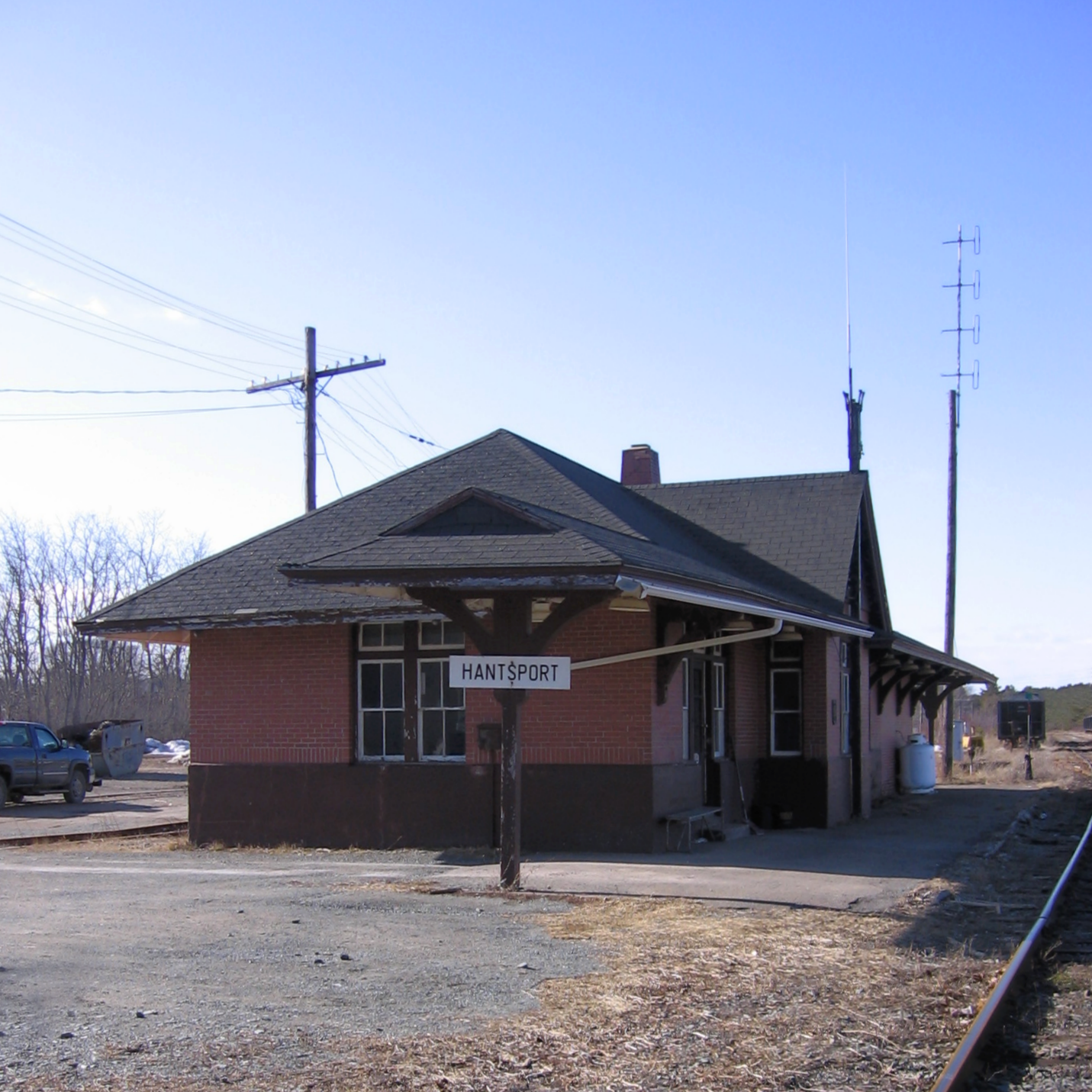
- Exterior view of train station

General information
- Location: 15 Station Street, Hantsport, Nova Scotia; Canada
- Coordinates: 45°04′07″N 64°10′35″W
- Owner: Windsor and Hantsport Railway and formerly by Dominion Atlantic Railway

History
- Opened: 1944
Location

Hantsport station in Hantsport, Nova Scotia, Canada, was built in 1944 as a replacement for an earlier station destroyed by fire in 1943. The brick Tudor revival station was designed by Canadian Pacific Railway architects. The station played an important role in controlling the large shipments of gypsum through the port of Hantsport by the Dominion Atlantic Railway and later the Windsor and Hantsport Railway until 2011 when the gypsum mines around Windsor closed. The station is protected by both federal and provincial heritage laws. It was designated a historic railway station by the federal government in 1992 and as a provincial heritage building in 1995.

== See also ==
- List of historic places in Hants County, Nova Scotia
