= Joseph Fairbanks =

Canadian politician

Joseph Fairbanks (September 17, 1718 – July 10, 1790) was a merchant and political figure in Nova Scotia. He was a member of the 1st General Assembly of Nova Scotia and later represented Halifax Township in the Nova Scotia House of Assembly from 1776 to 1785.

He was born in Sherborn, Massachusetts, and moved to Halifax in 1749. In that year, he married his second wife, Elizabeth Wooton. He married Lydia Blackden in 1756. He served as lieutenant during the first siege of Louisbourg in 1745. In his last will and testament he freed his slave. He died in Halifax at the age of 87 and is buried in the Old Burying Ground (Halifax, Nova Scotia).
