= Casper Wollenhaupt =

Canadian politician

Casper Wollenhaupt (1755 – 13 July 1809) was a merchant and political figure in Nova Scotia. He represented Lunenburg Township in the Legislative Assembly of Nova Scotia from 1783 to 1793 and from 1799 to 1806.

He was baptized in March 1755 at Lunenburg, Nova Scotia, the son of Conrad Wollenhaupt, of German origin, and Gertrude Wolff. In 1778, he married Ann Mary Jacobs. Wollenhaupt served as a lieutenant in the Halifax militia. He died in Lunenburg at the age of 54.
