= Robert Campbell (Nova Scotia politician) =

Canadian politician

Robert Campbell (1718 – January 3, 1775) was a merchant and political figure in Nova Scotia. He was a member of the 1st General Assembly of Nova Scotia and represented Halifax County in the Nova Scotia House of Assembly from 1770 to 1775.

He came to Halifax in 1749 with Edward Cornwallis. Campbell was among those who petitioned for the establishment of representative government for Nova Scotia in 1757.
