= George Brightman =

Canadian politician

George Brightman (July 3, 1746 – April 21, 1786) was a political figure in Nova Scotia. He represented Hants County in the Legislative Assembly of Nova Scotia from 1783 to 1785.

He was born in Dartmouth, Massachusetts, the son of Thomas Brighton and Judah Manchester. Brightman firstly married Hannah Baker, who died before 1764 and secondly Hannah Bailey. There were seven children in the second marriage and one in the first. He came from Rhode Island to settle in Newport township and was an original grantee for the Crown grant of 21 July 1761. Brightman served as a justice of the peace for Hants County. He was elected to the assembly in a 1783 by-election, the first election for Hants County. He died at the age of 39.

The draw for individual lands on 18 February 1762, which divided the Crown grant of the previous year saw George Brightman as well as Aaron Butts jointly drawing Newport Farm (lot B, 1st Division No. 1). In Duncanson's history of Newport NS, he indicates that "at the time of his death George Brightman owned considerable Newport property; he had sold half of Farm Lot B 1st Division No. 1 to John Chambers (site of the Old Stone House in Poplar Grove)". This stone house became of interest in 2012 when it was revealed that it was for sale for $2 million by owner Sherman Hines, who bought the house in a state of ruin in 1982 for $15,000 and had spent 30 years restoring the property. The estate includes over 100 acres and 7 buildings including the Acadian Stone House also known as The Mission. Hines indicated to the CBC television that he has traced the construction back to 1699, and that it was built by the French as a mission and a fortification against the English after searching old maps and books.

"As far as I can find in any research I have done, it is the oldest building east of Quebec City," he said.
