= Lambert Folkers =

Canadian politician

Lambert Folkers (died 1761) was a baker and politician. He served as a member of the 1st General Assembly of Nova Scotia; Folkers was in Halifax, Nova Scotia, by 1750. In 1761, he married Elizabeth Shelfers, his second wife. He was buried on July 9, 1761.
