= Joseph Woodmass =

Canadian politician

Joseph Woodmass (– ca 1775) was a political figure in Nova Scotia. He represented Annapolis County in the Nova Scotia House of Assembly from 1761 to 1765. His surname also appears as Woodmas.

He came to Nova Scotia from England around or shortly before 1760 as Receiver-General for quit rents for the province and served in that post until 1774. He was ordered to apologize to the House of Assembly for words that he had with the speaker William Nesbitt outside the house. Woodmass was a magistrate in Halifax until 1775. He returned to England in that year to settle his accounts and died there shortly afterwards.
