= Stephen West (Nova Scotia politician) =

Canadian politician

Stephen West (c. 1724 – January 8, 1771) was an American-born political figure in Nova Scotia. He was born in Tisbury, Massachusetts, the son of Abner West and Jane Cottle.

He represented Cornwallis Township in the 3rd General Assembly of Nova Scotia from 1761 to 1764. His seat was declared vacant on April 3, 1764 due to illness. West also served as a justice of the peace for King's County.
