= Joseph Gerrish =

Canadian politician

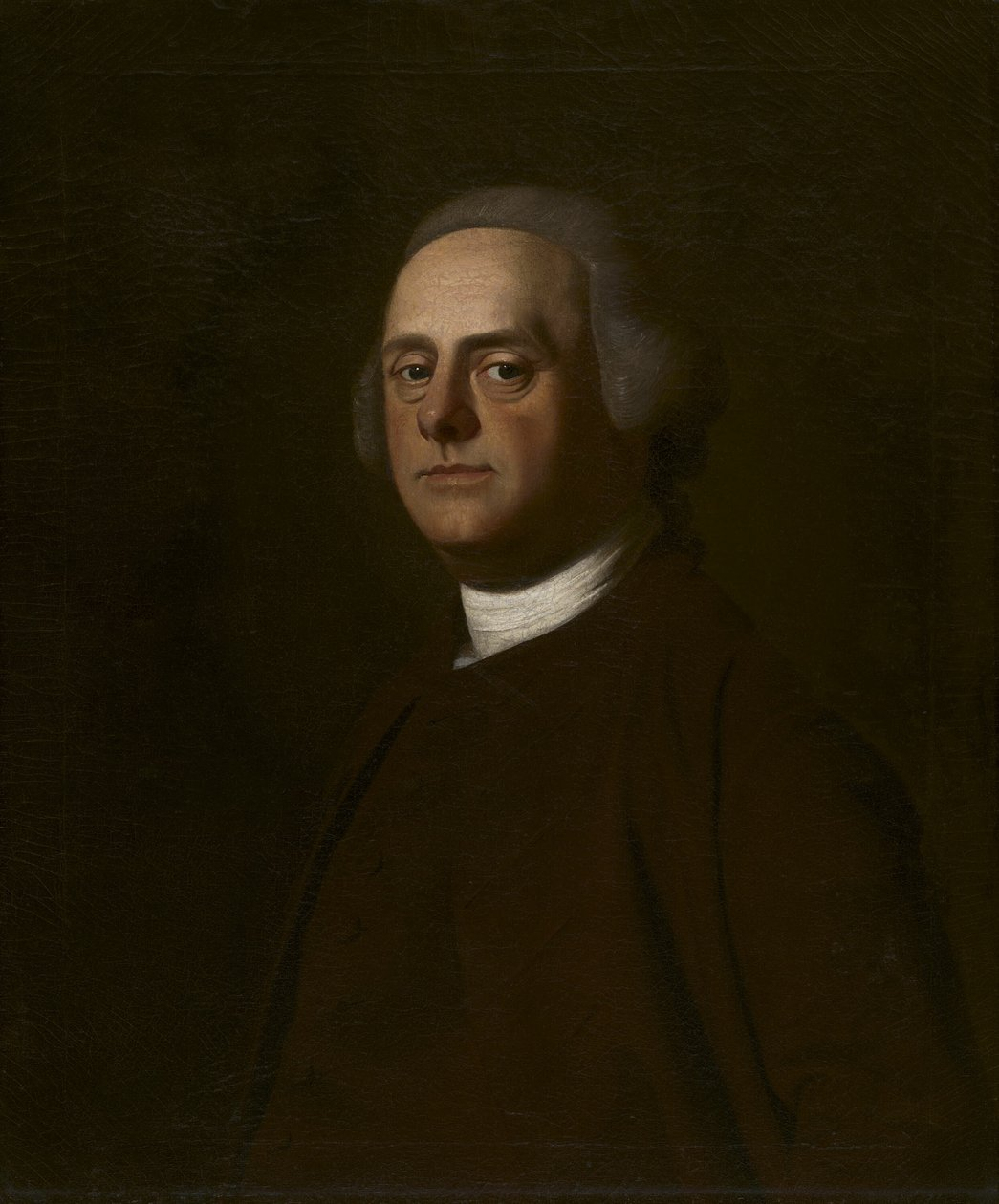
1770 portrait of Gerrish by John Singleton Copley

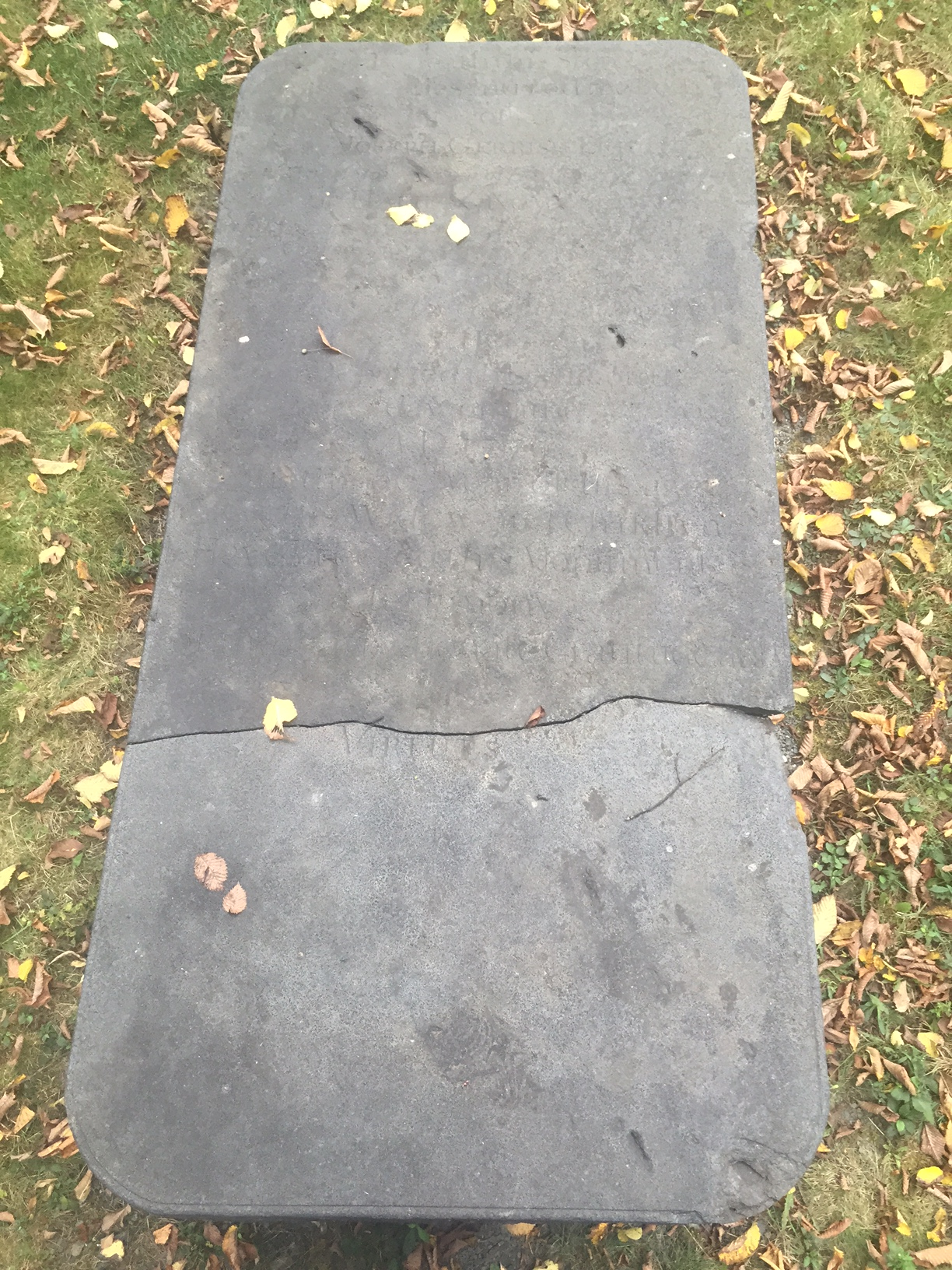
Joseph Gerrish, Old Burying Ground (Halifax, Nova Scotia)

Joseph Gerrish (September 29, 1709 – June 3, 1774) was a soldier, merchant, judge and political figure in Nova Scotia. He was a member of the 1st General Assembly of Nova Scotia. He is buried in the Old Burying Ground (Halifax, Nova Scotia).

He was born in Boston, Massachusetts, the son of John Gerrish and Sarah Hobbes. He entered business with his father, a Boston merchant. In 1740, Gerrish married Mary Brenton, with whom he had two daughters. The second daughter, Susannah, married Ephraim Stannus of Comus, with whom she had a son, Ephraim Gerrish Stannus. He served with the 3rd Massachusetts Regiment in the Siege of Louisbourg (1745) and then wounded at the Battle of Grand Pré. With a partner, he supplied goods to the garrison at Annapolis Royal. In 1749, he moved to Halifax. He established a fishing business which failed and supported his family by farming. He served as justice of the peace and judge of the Inferior Court of Common Pleas. In 1759, he was named naval storekeeper for the royal shipyard. In the same year, he was named to the Nova Scotia Council. With his brother Benjamin, he helped organize a boycott of the provincial assembly after lieutenant governor Jonathan Belcher did not renew the debtor's act in 1761. As a result, he was temporarily removed from office but reinstated after Belcher was replaced. In 1766, he was named surrogate judge in the vice admiralty court at Halifax. He married Mary Cradock in 1768 after the death of his first wife. Gerrish died in Halifax at the age of 64.

== Legacy ==
- Gerrish Street, Halifax, was named for Joseph Gerrish. In 2006 the street was renamed Buddy Daye Street. There remains a Gerrish lane perpendicular to Buddy Daye Street.
