= Thomas Bridge =

Canadian politician

Thomas Bridge (– after 1781) was a political figure in Nova Scotia. He represented Halifax Township in the Nova Scotia House of Assembly from 1770 to 1781.

In 1766, he married the widow Susan Scott. Bridge was named a justice of the peace for Halifax County in 1774. He was named a clerk of licenses for the town of Halifax in the same year. Bridge also served as coroner for the county. He is believed to have left Nova Scotia in 1781.
