= Obadiah Wheelock =

Canadian politician

Obadiah Wheelock III (7 July 1738 – Mendon, Massachusetts – 7 January 1807 Annapolis, Nova Scotia) was a political figure in Nova Scotia. He represented Annapolis Township in the Nova Scotia House of Assembly from 1770 to 1774.

== Life ==
He was born in Mendon, Massachusetts and came to Annapolis, Nova Scotia in 1760. He was unseated for non-attendance in 1774.

== Family ==
Obadiah Wheelock III was a second cousin, once removed, of Eleazar Wheelock, founder of Dartmouth College. Put another way, his paternal great-great-grandparents, Ralph Wheelock (1600–1684) and Rebecca Clarke (1610–1680), were also the great-grandparents of Eleazar Wheelock. Obadiah's third cousin (Eleazar's son), John Wheelock, was Dartmouth's founding president.
