= Joseph Patten =

Canadian politician

Joseph Patten (1710–1787) was a political figure in Nova Scotia. He represented Annapolis County in the Nova Scotia House of Assembly from 1770 to 1774 and from 1775 to 1776.

He was born in Billerica, Massachusetts and came to Nova Scotia around 1760. Patten was named a justice of the peace for Granville township in 1763. In 1774, his seat was declared vacant for non-attendance; he was elected again in 1775.
