= Samuel Willoughby =

Canadian politician

Samuel Willoughby (August 20, 1730 – between 1776 and 1790) was a physician and political figure in Nova Scotia.

He was born in New London, Connecticut, the son of Joseph Willoughby and Thankful Bliss. He received a land grant in Cornwallis, where he is believed to have set up practice. Willoughby is thought to have been the first physician in King's County after the expulsion of the Acadians. Willoughby married Alice English in 1760. In 1768, he was named a justice of the peace for King's County. Willoughby was also a member of the first Masonic lodge in the county.

He was elected to the Nova Scotia House of Assembly for Cornwallis Township in 1761. His seat was declared vacant for non-attendance on April 26, 1762. He was reelected in 1770, his seat being again declared vacant for non-attendance on June 28, 1776.
