= Henry Denny Denson =

Canadian politician

Henry Denny Denson (ca 1715 – 3 June 1780) was an Irish-born soldier and political figure in Nova Scotia. He was a member of the Nova Scotia House of Assembly from 1761 to 1765 for Falmouth Township, from 16 October 1769 to 1770 for Newport Township, and from 1770 until his death in 1780 for Kings County.

He was born in County Mayo. He married in Ireland but shortly afterwards joined the British Army as a lieutenant, leaving his wife behind in Dublin. By 1760, he had decided to settle in Nova Scotia and was serving as an agent for the Nova Scotia government in settling people from New England. He acquired a large property (in excess of 4000 acres) where he wished to recreate a baronial estate, which he named Mount Denson. The estate was a complex farm utilizing both dyked marshlands and pastures cleared from the wooded uplands. Here he raised beef and dairy cattle, grains, and apples which were to supply his cider press. A census taken in 1770 indicates "Mount Denson yielded 250 bushels of wheat, 10 bushels of flax seed and 40 bushels of oats; livestock consisted of 150 sheep, 96 cattle, 12 swine, and 8 horses". To run the estate Denson utilized tenant farmers, indentured servants and slaves.

In 1761, he was named justice in the Inferior Court of Common Pleas. Denson was also an officer in the militia, commissioner for roads and customs collector for the county. Denson often clashed with his neighbours, the New England Planters. To them he represented the British authority that had broken its promise to allow the new settlers to retain their form of township governance which they had enjoyed in New England. The British administration in Halifax enforced a centralized government regime which meant a loss of power and self-determination to the Planters.

By the late 1770s in declining health and suffering from extreme bouts of gout, he resigned from the militia and shortly afterwards died at Mount Denson, Falmouth.

== Sources ==
- Bumsted, J M (1979). "Henry Denny Denson". In Halpenny, Francess G (ed.). Dictionary of Canadian Biography. Vol. IV (1771–1800) (online ed.). University of Toronto Press.
