= William Nesbitt (Nova Scotia politician) =

Canadian politician (c.1707–1784)

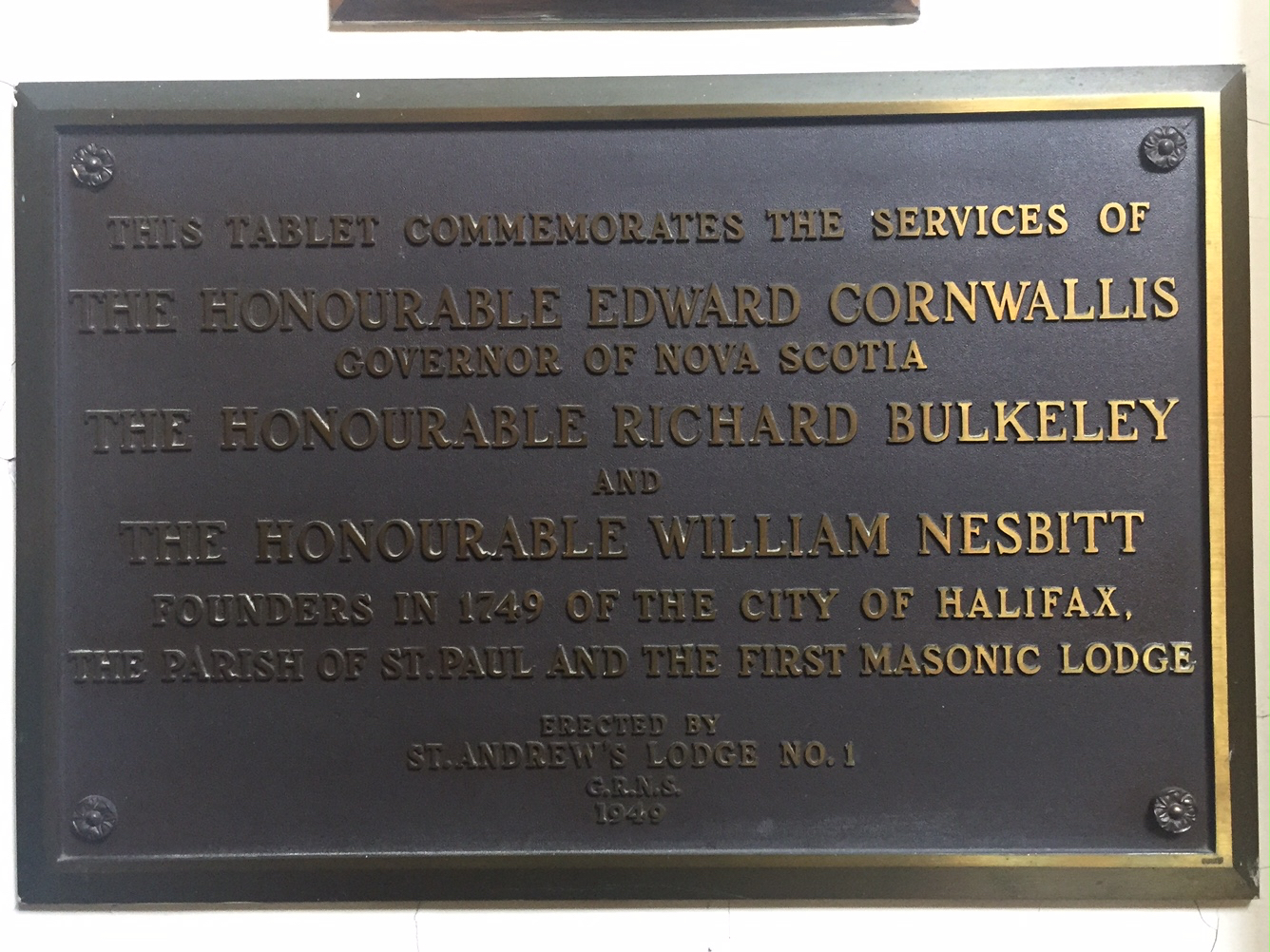
Edward Cornwallis, Richard Bulkeley, William Nesbitt Plaque, St. Paul's Church (Halifax), Nova Scotia

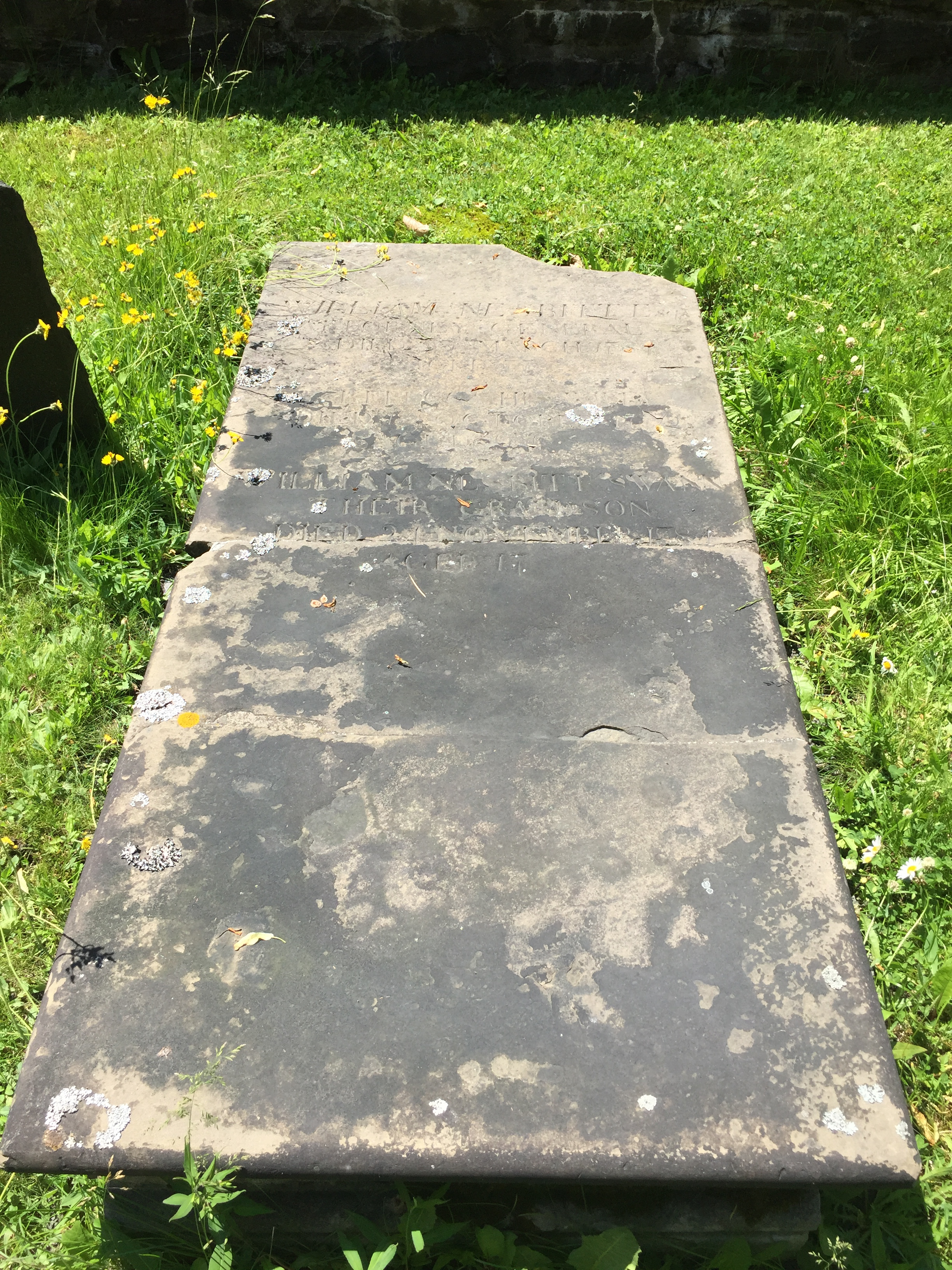
William Nesbitt, Old Burying Ground, Halifax, Nova Scotia

William Nesbitt (ca 1707 – March 23, 1784) was a lawyer and political figure in Nova Scotia. He served as a member of the Nova Scotia House of Assembly from 1758 to 1783.

He came to Nova Scotia in 1749 as Edward Cornwallis' clerk. In 1752, he qualified as a notary public. The following year he became judge advocate of the vice admiralty court and attorney general. Nesbitt married Rebecca Phelan in 1756 after the death of his first wife. Nesbitt was named speaker for the provincial assembly in 1759 and served in that post until 1783. He also served as justice of the peace and surrogate general for the Probate Court. He was accused of opposing the colony's administrator Francis Legge while speaker; he also signed a petition critical of Legge. At the outbreak of the American Revolution, Nesbitt presided over the trial for treason of the future attorney general Richard John Uniacke after he participated in the Eddy Rebellion. Nesbitt resigned as attorney general in 1779. He died in Halifax and is buried in the Old Burying Ground (Halifax, Nova Scotia).

Portraits of Nesbitt and his wife hung in the King's College Library, Windsor (1920), which was destroyed by fire the same year.

== Legacy ==
- namesake of Nesbitt Island (Mill Island), Windsor, Nova Scotia
- namesake of Nesbitt Street, Windsor, Nova Scotia
