= 16th General Assembly of Nova Scotia =

The 16th General Assembly of Nova Scotia represented Nova Scotia between 1840 and 1843. The assembly was dissolved on October 26, 1843.

The assembly sat at the pleasure of the Governor of Nova Scotia, Lucius Bentinck Cary.

Joseph Howe was chosen as speaker for the house.

== List of members ==
Electoral District	Name	Party	First elected / previously elected
Township of Amherst	Robert McGowan Dickie	Conservative	1836
Annapolis County	Samuel B. Chipman	Liberal	1840
Township of Annapolis	Henry Gates	Liberal	1840
Township of Argyle	John Ryder	Liberal	1840
Township of Arichat	Henry Martell	Liberal	1840
Township of Barrington	John W. Homer	Liberal	1840
County of Cape Breton	James Boyle Uniacke	Liberal	1818
Township of Clare	Anselme F. Comeau	Liberal	1840
Colchester County	Samuel G. W. Archibald (Note: named master of the rolls)	Liberal	1830
Colchester County	Thomas Dickson (1841)	Liberal	1818, (Note: Sydney County) 1838, (Note: Pictou County), 1841
Township of Cornwallis	Mayhew Beckwith	Conservative	1840
Cumberland County	Gaius Lewis	Liberal	1836
Cumberland County	Stephen Fulton	Conservative	1840
Digby County	James B. Holdsworth	Liberal	1836
Township of Digby	Charles Budd	Conservative	1840
Township of Falmouth	Lewis J. Payzant	Independent	1840
Township of Granville	Stephen S. Thorne	Conservative	1836
Guysborough County	William F. DesBarres	Liberal	1836
Guysborough County	John J. Marshall	Conservative	1840
Halifax County	Joseph Howe	Liberal	1836
Halifax County	William Annand	Liberal	1836
Township of Halifax	James McNab	Liberal	1840
Township of Halifax	Thomas Forrester (Note: died in 1841)	Liberal	1836
Township of Halifax	William Stairs (1841)	Liberal	1841
Hants County	Benjamin Smith	Conservative	1836
Hants County	George McKay	Liberal	1840
Township of Horton	William Johnson	Conservative	1840
Inverness County	William Young	Liberal	1840
Inverness County	James Turnbull	Liberal	1840
Kings County	Thomas Andrew Strange DeWolf	Conservative	1836
Kings County	Samuel Chipman	Liberal	1830
Township of Liverpool	William B. Taylor	Conservative	1836
Township of Londonderry	Gloud W. McLelan	Liberal	1836
Lunenburg County	John Creighton	Conservative	1830, 1838
Lunenburg County	Edward Zwicker	Conservative	1840
Township of Lunenburg	John Heckman	Conservative	1826
Township of Newport	Ichabod Dimock	Liberal	1840
Town of Onslow	Alexander M. Upham	Liberal	1836
Town of Onslow	John Crowe (1841)	Conservative	1835, 1841
Pictou County	John Holmes	Conservative	1836
Pictou County	Henry Blackadar	Conservative	1840
Township of Pictou	Henry Hatton	Conservative	1836
Queens County	James R. DeWolf	Conservative	1830, 1840
Queens County	Samuel P. Fairbanks	Conservative	1836
Richmond County	James McKeagney (Note: election appealed)	Liberal	1840
Richmond County	William C. Delaney (1841)	Liberal	1841
Shelburne County	Gilbert McKenna	Liberal	1840
Township of Shelburne	Peter Spearwater, Jr.	Liberal	1836
Sydney County	Richard J. Forrestall	Liberal	1837
Sydney County	William A. Henry	Liberal	1840
Township of Sydney	Edmund Murray Dodd	Conservative	1832
Town of Truro	Alexander L. Archibald	Conservative	1830
Township of Windsor	Henry Goudge	Liberal	1840
Township of Windsor	Henry Palmer (1841)	Liberal	1841
Yarmouth County	Herbert Huntington	Liberal	1836
Township of Yarmouth	Reuben Clements	Liberal	1830, 1835

== Notes ==
Preceded by 15th General Assembly of Nova Scotia	General Assemblies of Nova Scotia; 1840–1843	Succeeded by 17th General Assembly of Nova Scotia
