= 17th General Assembly of Nova Scotia =

The 17th General Assembly of Nova Scotia represented Nova Scotia between 1843 and 1847.

The assembly sat at the pleasure of the Governor of Nova Scotia, Lucius Bentinck Cary. Jeremiah Dickson became governor in 1846.

William Young was chosen as speaker for the house.

== List of members ==
| Electoral District | Name | Party | First elected / previously elected |
|---|---|---|---|
| Township of Amherst | Thomas Logan | Liberal | 1843 |
| Annapolis County | James W. Johnston | Conservative | 1843 |
| Township of Annapolis | Alfred Whitman | Conservative | 1843 |
| Township of Argyle | John Ryder | Conservative | 1840 |
| Township of Arichat | Henry Martell | Liberal | 1840 |
| Township of Barrington | Paul Crowell | Liberal | 1843 |
| County of Cape Breton | James Boyle Uniacke | Liberal | 1818 |
| Township of Clare | Anselme F. Comeau | Liberal | 1840 |
| Colchester County | John Ross | Conservative | 1843 |
| Township of Cornwallis | Mayhew Beckwith | Conservative | 1840 |
| Cumberland County | Stephen Fulton | Conservative | 1840 |
| Cumberland County | Robert McGowan Dickie | Conservative | 1843 |
| Digby County | François Bourneuf | Liberal | 1843 |
| Township of Digby | Charles Budd | Conservative | 1840 |
| Township of Falmouth | Elkanah Young | Conservative | 1843 |
| Township of Granville | Stephen S. Thorne | Conservative | 1836 |
| Guysborough County | William F. DesBarres | Liberal | 1836 |
| Guysborough County | John J. Marshall | Conservative | 1840 |
| Halifax County | Joseph Howe | Liberal | 1836 |
| Halifax County | Laurence O'Connor Doyle | Liberal | 1843 |
| Township of Halifax | James McNab | Liberal | 1840 |
| Township of Halifax | Andrew M. Uniacke | Conservative | 1843 |
| Hants County | Benjamin Smith | Conservative | 1836 |
| Hants County | Lewis Morris Wilkins | Conservative | 1833, (Note: Windsor Township) 1843 |
| Township of Horton | Perez M. Benjamin | Liberal | 1843 |
| Inverness County | William Young | Liberal | 1840 |
| Inverness County | James McKeagney | Liberal | 1843 |
| Kings County | Thomas Andrew Strange DeWolf | Conservative | 1836 |
| Kings County | John Clarke Hall | Conservative | 1843 |
| Township of Liverpool | William B. Taylor | Conservative | 1836 |
| Township of Londonderry | Gloud W. McLelan | Liberal | 1836 |
| Lunenburg County | John Creighton | Conservative | 1830, 1838 |
| Lunenburg County | Charles B. Owen | Conservative | 1843 |
| Township of Lunenburg | John Heckman | Conservative | 1826 |
| Township of Newport | Ichabod Dimock | Liberal | 1840 |
| Town of Onslow | John Crowe | Conservative | 1835, 1841 |
| Pictou County | John Holmes | Conservative | 1836 |
| Pictou County | George R. Young | Liberal | 1843 |
| Township of Pictou | George Smith (Note: election appealed) | Liberal | 1819, (Note: Halifax County) 1843 |
| Township of Pictou | Henry Blackadar (1845) | Liberal | 1840, 1845 |
| Queens County | Samuel P. Fairbanks | Conservative | 1836 |
| Queens County | Snow P. Freeman | Conservative | 1843 |
| Queens County | John Campbell (1845) | Conservative | 1845 |
| Richmond County | James Turnbull | Liberal | 1843 |
| Richmond County | Arthur Brymer (1846) | Liberal | 1846 |
| Shelburne County | Obadiah Wilson | Independent | 1843 |
| Township of Shelburne | Peter Spearwater, Jr. | Liberal | 1836 |
| Sydney County | George Brenan | Liberal | 1843 |
| Sydney County | Patrick Power | Liberal | 1843 |
| Township of Sydney | Edmund Murray Dodd | Conservative | 1832 |
| Town of Truro | William Fleming | Conservative | 1843 |
| Township of Windsor | James D. Fraser | Conservative | 1843 |
| Yarmouth County | Herbert Huntington | Liberal | 1836 |
| Township of Yarmouth | Reuben Clements | Liberal | 1830, 1835 |

== Notes ==
| Preceded by 16th General Assembly of Nova Scotia | General Assemblies of Nova Scotia; 1843–1847 | Succeeded by 18th General Assembly of Nova Scotia |
