= 15th General Assembly of Nova Scotia =

The 15th General Assembly of Nova Scotia represented Nova Scotia between 1836 and 1840. The assembly was dissolved on October 21, 1840.

The assembly sat at the pleasure of the Governor of Nova Scotia, Colin Campbell.

Samuel George William Archibald was chosen as speaker for the house.

== List of members ==
Electoral District	Name	Party	First elected / previously elected
Township of Amherst	Robert McGowan Dickie	Conservative	1836
Annapolis County	Frederick A. Robicheau	Liberal	1836
Annapolis County	William Holland	Independent	1836
Township of Annapolis	Elnathan Whitman	Conservative	1836
Township of Argyle	Simon D'Entremont	Liberal	1836
Township of Arichat	Laurence O'Connor Doyle	Liberal	1832
Township of Barrington	John Sargent	Conservative	1836
County of Cape Breton	James Boyle Uniacke	Conservative	1818
Colchester County	Samuel G. W. Archibald	Independent	1830
Township of Cornwallis	John Morton	Conservative	1826
Cumberland County	Gaius Lewis	Liberal	1836
Cumberland County	Alexander Stewart (Note: named to Legislative Council)	Liberal	1826
Cumberland County	Andrew McKim (1838)	Liberal	1838
Township of Digby	James B. Holdsworth	Liberal	1836
Township of Falmouth	John Elder	Conservative	1836
Township of Granville	Stephen S. Thorne	Conservative	1836
Guysborough County	William F. DesBarres	Liberal	1836
Guysborough County	Hugh McDonald	Liberal	1836
Halifax County	Joseph Howe	Liberal	1836
Halifax County	William Annand	Liberal	1836
Township of Halifax	Hugh Bell	Liberal	1835
Township of Halifax	Thomas Forrester	Liberal	1836
Hants County	Benjamin Smith	Conservative	1836
Hants County	Henry Goudge	Liberal	1836
Township of Horton	Perez M. Benjamin	Liberal	1836
Juste-au-Corps County	William Young	Liberal	1836
Juste-au-Corps County	James Turnbull	Liberal	1836
Kings County	Samuel Chipman	Liberal	1830
Kings County	Thomas Andrew Strange DeWolf	Conservative	1836
Township of Liverpool	William B. Taylor	Conservative	1836
Township of Londonderry	Gloud W. McLelan	Liberal	1836
Lunenburg County	William Rudolf	Liberal	1826
Lunenburg County	John Creighton (1838)	Conservative	1830, 1838
Lunenburg County	Garrett Miller	Liberal	1836
Township of Lunenburg	John Heckman	Conservative	1826
Township of Newport	James Whidden Allison	Conservative	1836
Town of Onslow	Alexander M. Upham	Liberal	1836
Pictou County	George Smith	Liberal	1836
Pictou County	John Holmes	Conservative	1836
Pictou County	Thomas Dickson (1838)	Liberal	1818, (Note: Sydney County) 1838
Township of Pictou	Henry Hatton	Conservative	1836
Queens County	Joseph Freeman	Liberal	1811
Queens County	Samuel P. Fairbanks	Conservative	1836
Queens County	Zenas Waterman (1837)	Liberal	1837
Richmond County	Laurence Kavanagh	Liberal	1836
Shelburne County	Winthrop Sargent	Conservative	1836
Township of Shelburne	Peter Spearwater, Jr.	Liberal	1836
Sydney County	Alexander McDougall	Liberal	1836
Sydney County	John Young (Note: died in 1837)	Liberal	1824
Sydney County	Richard J. Forrestall (1837)	Liberal	1837
Township of Sydney	Edmund Murray Dodd	Conservative	1832
Town of Truro	Alexander L. Archibald	Conservative	1830
Township of Windsor	Lewis M. Wilkins	Conservative	1833
Township of Windsor	Richard A. McHeffy (1838)	Liberal	1838
Yarmouth County	Herbert Huntington	Liberal	1836
Township of Yarmouth	Reuben Clements	Liberal	1830, 1835

== Notes ==
Preceded by 14th General Assembly of Nova Scotia	General Assemblies of Nova Scotia; 1836–1840	Succeeded by 16th General Assembly of Nova Scotia
