= 18th General Assembly of Nova Scotia =

The 18th General Assembly of Nova Scotia represented Nova Scotia between the 1847 and 1851, its membership being set in the August 5th, 1847 Nova Scotia general election.

The Assembly sat at the pleasure of the Governor of Nova Scotia, Sir John Harvey.

This Assembly is noteworthy for many reasons. It was the first Assembly elected after the adoption of the Simultaneous Polling Bill, which resulted in an election in days, rather than three to four weeks. It was the first election after the establishment of responsible government. The government of James W. Johnstone was the first to be defeated in the polls in Nova Scotia, resulting in a want of confidence resolution passing in the House, and the first resignation of a government in the province. Finally, the Governor asked James B. Uniacke to submit an outline of a new administration, and form the first elected, responsible government in the Province of Nova Scotia.

== List of Members ==
Electoral District	Name	Party	First elected / previously elected
Township of Amherst	W. W. Bent	Conservative	1847
Annapolis County	James W. Johnston	Conservative	1843
Township of Annapolis	Alfred Whitman	Conservative	1843
Township of Argyle	John Ryder	Conservative	1840
Township of Arichat	Henry Martell	Liberal	1840
Township of Barrington	John Homer	Liberal	1847
County of Cape Breton	James B. Uniacke	Liberal	1818
County of Cape Breton	William Henry Munro (1848)	Liberal	1848
Township of Clare	Anselm F. Comeau	Liberal	1840
Colchester County	Samuel Creelman	Liberal	1847
Township of Cornwallis	Mayhew Beckwith	Conservative	1840
Cumberland County	Stephen Fulton	Conservative	1840
Cumberland County	R. McGowan Dickie	Conservative	1843
Digby County	Francis Bourneuf	Liberal	1843
Township of Digby	Charles Budd	Conservative	1836, 1840
Township of Falmouth	James Sangster	Liberal	1847
Township of Granville	Stephen S. Thorne	Conservative	1836
Guysborough County	W. F. DesBarres	Liberal	1836
Guysborough County	A. McDonald	Liberal	1836, 1847
Guysborough County	John Joseph Marshall (1848)	Conservative	1840, 1848
Halifax County	Joseph Howe	Liberal	1836
Halifax County	Henry Y. Mott	Liberal	1847
Township of Halifax	James McNab	Liberal	1840
Township of Halifax	Lawrence O'C. Doyle	Liberal	1843
Township of Halifax	James B. Uniacke (1848)	Liberal	1818, (Note: Cape Breton County) 1848
Hants County	William Card	Liberal	1847
Hants County	John McDougall	Liberal	1847
Township of Horton	Edward L. Brown	Liberal	1847
Inverness County	William Young	Liberal	1840
Inverness County	Peter Smyth	Liberal	1847
Kings County	John C. Hall	Conservative	1843
Kings County	Daniel Moore	Conservative	1847
Township of Liverpool	William B. Taylor	Conservative	1836
Township of Londonderry	John Wier	Conservative	1847
Lunenburg County	George Ernst	Liberal	1847
Lunenburg County	Henry Mignowitz	Liberal	1847
Township of Lunenburg	John Kedy	Liberal	1847
Township of Newport	Ichabod Dimock	Liberal	1840
Town of Onslow	John Crowe	Conservative	1835, 1841
Pictou County	G.R. Young	Liberal	1843
Pictou County	Andrew Robertson	Liberal	1847
Township of Pictou	Henry Blackadar	Liberal	1840, 1845
Queens County	S.P. Freeman	Conservative	1843
Queens County	John Campbell	Conservative	1845
Richmond County	Chas. F. Harrington	Conservative	1847
Shelburne County	Gilbert McKenna	Liberal	1840, 1847
Township of Shelburne	Joshua Snow	Conservative	1847
Sydney County	William A.Henry	Liberal	1847
Sydney County	James McLeod	Liberal	1847
Township of Sydney	Edmund M. Dodd	Conservative	1832
Township of Sydney	James McKeagney (1848)	Liberal	1848
Town of Truro	William Fleming (Note: Fleming's election was overturned and Alexander Lackie Archibald was declared elected in 1848)	Conservative	1843
Town of Truro	Alexander Lackie Archibald (1848)	Conservative	1848
Township of Windsor	James D. Fraser	Conservative	1843
Yarmouth County	Herbert Huntington	Liberal	1836
Township of Yarmouth	Thomas Killam	Liberal	1847

== Notes ==
Preceded by 17th General Assembly of Nova Scotia	General Assemblies of Nova Scotia; 1847–1851	Succeeded by 19th General Assembly of Nova Scotia
