= 19th General Assembly of Nova Scotia =

The 19th General Assembly of Nova Scotia represented Nova Scotia between 1851 and 1855. The assembly was dissolved on April 25, 1855.

The assembly sat at the pleasure of the Governor of Nova Scotia, John Harvey. John Le Marchant became governor in 1852.

William Young was chosen as speaker for the house.

== List of members ==
Electoral District	Name	Party	First elected / previously elected
Township of Amherst	William W. Bent	Conservative	1847
Annapolis County	J. W. Johnston	Conservative	1843
Township of Annapolis	Alfred Whitman	Conservative	1843
Township of Argyle	John Ryder	Conservative	1840
Township of Arichat	Henry Martell	Liberal	1840
Township of Barrington	Josiah Coffin	Conservative	1851
County of Cape Breton	James McLeod	Liberal	1851
Township of Clare	Anselme F. Comeau	Liberal	1840
Colchester County	Adams G. Archibald	Conservative	1851
Colchester County	Gloud W. McLelan	Liberal	1836, (Note: Londonderry Township) 1851
Township of Cornwallis	Samuel Chipman	Liberal	1830, (Note: King's County) 1851
Cumberland County	Joseph Howe	Liberal	1836
Cumberland County	Stephen Fulton	Liberal	1840
Digby County	François Bourneuf	Liberal	1843
Township of Digby	John C. Wade	Liberal	1851
Township of Falmouth	Elkanah Young	Conservative	1843, 1851
Township of Granville	Stephen S. Thorne	Conservative	1836
Guysborough County	John J. Marshall	Conservative	1840, 1848
Guysborough County	Stewart Campbell	Liberal	1851
Halifax County	William Annand	Liberal	1836, 1851
Halifax County	John Esson	Liberal	1851
Township of Halifax	Benjamin Wier	Liberal	1851
Township of Halifax	L. O'Connor Doyle	Liberal	1843
Hants County	Benjamin Smith	Conservative	1836, 1851
Hants County	Nicholas Mosher	Conservative	1851
Township of Horton	Edward L. Brown	Liberal	1847
Inverness County	William Young	Liberal	1840
Inverness County	Peter Smyth	Liberal	1847
Kings County	John C. Hall	Conservative	1843
Kings County	Daniel Moore	Conservative	1847
Kings County	Mayhew Beckwith (1853)	Conservative	1841, (Note: Cornwallis Township) 1853
Township of Liverpool	Andrew Cowie	Conservative	1851
Township of Londonderry	James Campbell	Liberal	1851
Lunenburg County	John Creighton	Conservative	1830, 1838, 1851
Lunenburg County	Benjamin Zwicker	Conservative	1851
Township of Lunenburg	Henry S. Jost	Conservative	1851
Township of Newport	Ichabod Dimock	Liberal	1840
Pictou County	John Holmes	Conservative	1836, 1851
Pictou County	Robert Murray	Conservative	1851
Township of Pictou	Martin I. Wilkins	Conservative	1851
Queens County	John Campbell	Conservative	1845
Queens County	Snow P. Freeman	Conservative	1843
Richmond County	James B. Uniacke	Liberal	1818, (Note: Cape Breton County) 1848
Richmond County	Thomas Horace Fuller (1854)	Liberal	1854
Shelburne County	Thomas Coffin	Liberal	1851
Township of Shelburne	John Locke	Liberal	1851
Sydney County	John McKinnon	Liberal	1851
Sydney County	William A. Henry	Liberal	1847
Township of Sydney	Donald N. McQueen	Liberal	1851
Town of Truro	Samuel Creelman	Liberal	1851
Victoria County	Hugh Munro	Liberal	1851
Victoria County	John Munro	Conservative	1851
Township of Windsor	James D. Fraser (Note: died in 1852)	Conservative	1843
Township of Windsor	Lewis Morris Wilkins (1852)	Liberal	1833, 1852
Yarmouth County	Thomas Killam	Liberal	1847
Township of Yarmouth	Jesse Shaw	Liberal	1851

== Notes ==
Preceded by 18th General Assembly of Nova Scotia	General Assemblies of Nova Scotia; 1851–1855	Succeeded by 20th General Assembly of Nova Scotia
