= 20th General Assembly of Nova Scotia =

The 20th General Assembly of Nova Scotia represented Nova Scotia between 1855 and 1859.

The assembly sat at the pleasure of the Governor of Nova Scotia, John Le Marchant. George Phipps, Viscount Normanby, became governor in 1858.

Stewart Campbell was chosen as speaker for the house.

== List of Members ==
Electoral District	Name	Party	First elected / previously elected
Township of Amherst	William W. Bent	Conservative	1847
Annapolis County	J. W. Johnston	Conservative	1843
Township of Annapolis	Alfred Whitman (Note: named to Legislative Council)	Conservative	1843
Township of Annapolis	Moses Shaw (1858)	Conservative	1858
Township of Argyle	John Ryder	Conservative	1840
Township of Arichat	Henry Martell	Liberal	1840
Township of Barrington	Robert Robertson	Liberal	1855
County of Cape Breton	James McLeod	Liberal	1851
County of Cape Breton	Thomas Caldwell (1856)	Conservative	1856
Township of Clare	Mathurin Robicheau	Liberal	1855
Colchester County	Adams G. Archibald	Conservative	1851
Colchester County	Gloud W. McLelan (Note: died in 1858)	Liberal	1836, (Note: Londonderry Township) 1851
Colchester County	Archibald McLelan (1858)	Liberal	1858
Township of Cornwallis	Samuel Chipman	Liberal	1830, (Note: King's County) 1851
Cumberland County	Charles Tupper	Conservative	1855
Cumberland County	Alexander McFarlane	Conservative	1855
Digby County	François Bourneuf	Liberal	1843
Township of Digby	John C. Wade	Liberal	1851
Township of Falmouth	Ezra Churchill	Conservative	1855
Township of Granville	Stephen S. Thorne (Note: accepted appointment)	Conservative	1836
Township of Granville	Timothy Dwight Ruggles (1858)	Conservative	1858
Guysborough County	Stewart Campbell	Liberal	1851
Guysborough County	John J. Marshall	Conservative	1840, 1848
Halifax County	John Esson	Liberal	1851
Halifax County	William Annand	Liberal	1836, 1851
Township of Halifax	Benjamin Wier	Liberal	1851
Township of Halifax	John Tobin	Liberal	1855
Township of Halifax	John Tobin	Conservative	1855
Hants County	Ichabod Dimock	Liberal	1855
Hants County	Bennett Smith (1858)	Conservative	1858
Hants County	Francis R. Parker	Liberal	1855
Township of Horton	Edward L. Brown	Liberal	1847
Inverness County	William Young	Liberal	1840
Inverness County	Peter Smyth	Conservative	1847
Kings County	Caleb R. Bill	Conservative	1855
Kings County	William B. Webster	Liberal	1855
Township of Liverpool	Matthew McClearn	Conservative	1855
Township of Londonderry	Thomas F. Morrison	Liberal	1855
Lunenburg County	Benjamin Reinhardt	Conservative	1855
Lunenburg County	George Geldert	Liberal	1855
Township of Lunenburg	Henry Bailey	Liberal	1855
Township of Newport	William Chambers	Conservative	1855
Pictou County	George McKenzie	Liberal	1855
Pictou County	Alexander C. McDonald	Liberal	1855
Township of Pictou	Martin I. Wilkins	Conservative	1851
Queens County	John Campbell	Conservative	1845
Queens County	Edward D. Davison	Liberal	1855
Richmond County	Thomas H. Fuller	Liberal	1854
Shelburne County	Cornelius White	Conservative	1855
Township of Shelburne	John Locke	Liberal	1851
Sydney County	John McKinnon	Liberal	1851
Sydney County	W. A. Henry	Liberal	1847
Township of Sydney	James McKeagney	Conservative	1855
Town of Truro	Hiram Hyde	Conservative	1855
Victoria County	Hugh Munro	Liberal	1851
Victoria County	Charles J. Campbell	Conservative	1855
Township of Windsor	Lewis M. Wilkins	Liberal	1833, 1852
Township of Windsor	Joseph Howe (1856)	Liberal	1836 (Note: Halifax County/Cumberland County) 1856
Yarmouth County	Thomas Killam	Liberal	1847
Township of Yarmouth	Nathan Moses	Conservative	1855

== Notes ==
Preceded by 19th General Assembly of Nova Scotia	General Assemblies of Nova Scotia; 1855–1859	Succeeded by 22nd General Assembly of Nova Scotia
