= Chipman =

Chipman, a surname, may refer to:

== People ==
- Ben Chipman, American politician
- Bob Chipman (1918–1973), American baseball player
- Bob Chipman (basketball) (born 1951), American basketball coach
- Dana K. Chipman (born 1958), former Judge Advocate General of the United States Army
- Daniel Chipman (1765–1850), American politician
- David Chipman, American former law-enforcement officer and gun control advocate
- Elizabeth Chipman (born 1934), Australian writer and Antarctic pioneer
- Foster Samuel Chipman (1829-unknown), American politician
- Frank Chipman (born 1947), Canadian politician
- George Fisher Chipman (1882–1935), Canadian journalist
- Henry C. Chipman (1784–1867), American judge
- Jared Ingersol Chipman (1788–1832), Nova Scotian lawyer, judge and politician
- John Chipman (disambiguation)
- Leverett de Veber Chipman (1831–1914), Canadian politician
- Mark Chipman (born 1960), Canadian businessman and sports executive
- Nathaniel Chipman (1752–1843), American judge and politician
- Norton P. Chipman (1834-1924), American army officer and politician
- Roy Chipman (c. 1939–1997), American basketball coach
- Samuel Chipman (1790–1891), Nova Scotian politician
- Samuel B. Chipman (1703–1855), Nova Scotian politician
- Stephen L. Chipman (1864–1945), American politician and Mormon missionary
- W. R. Chipman (1863–1932), American politician
- Ward Chipman (1754–1824), Chief Justice of New Brunswick
- Ward Chipman Jr. (1787–1851), New Brunswick lawyer, judge and politician
- William Chipman (disambiguation)

== Places ==
- Chipman, Alberta
  - Chipman Airport (Alberta)
- Chipman, New Brunswick
  - Chipman Airport (New Brunswick)
- Chipman Parish, New Brunswick

== See also ==
- Chipman Creek (disambiguation)
