= John S. Chipman =

John S. Chipman may refer to:

- John Smith Chipman (1800–1869), lawyer and U.S. representative from Michigan
- John Chipman (economist) (John Somerset Chipman, 1926–2022), Canadian economist

== See also ==
- John Chipman (disambiguation)
