= Moses Shaw =

Moses Shaw may refer to:

- Moses Shaw (Canadian politician)
- Moses Shaw (American politician)
