= Thomas Cutler =

Thomas Cutler may refer to:

- Thomas Cutler (Canadian politician) (1752–1837), judge and politician from Nova Scotia
- Thomas J. Cutler (born 1947), American Naval officer, historian, and author
- Thomas Cutler (MP), Member of Parliament for Winchester, c. 1421
