= 18th Nova Scotia general election =

18th Nova Scotia general election may refer to:

- Nova Scotia general election, 1847, the 18th general election to take place in the Colony of Nova Scotia, for the 18th General Assembly of Nova Scotia
- 1937 Nova Scotia general election, the 40th overall general election for Nova Scotia, for the (due to a counting error in 1859) 41st Legislative Assembly of Nova Scotia, but considered the 18th general election for the Canadian province of Nova Scotia
