= Robert B. Dickey =

Canadian Father of Confederation (1811–1903)

The Hon. Robert Barry Dickey
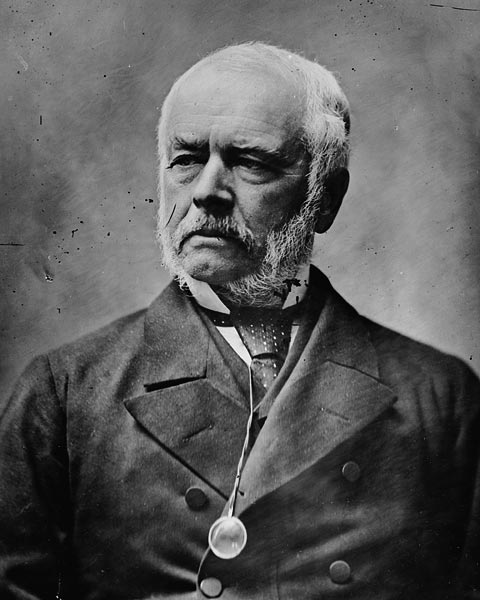

Senator for Amherst, Nova Scotia
- In office October 23, 1867 – July 14, 1903
- Appointed by: Royal Proclamation

Member of the Legislative Council of Nova Scotia
- In office 1858–1867

Personal details
- Born: November 10, 1811 Amherst, Nova Scotia
- Died: July 14, 1903 (aged 91)
- Party: Conservative
- Relations: Robert McGowan Dickie, father
- Children: Arthur Rupert Dickey, Mary Dickey

Robert Barry Dickey (November 10, 1811 – July 14, 1903) was a participant in the conferences leading to the Canadian Confederation of 1867 and is therefore considered to be one of the Fathers of Confederation.

Born in Amherst, the son of Robert McGowan Dickey and Eleanor Chapman, he was educated at Windsor Academy and later studied law with Alexander Stewart. He was called to the Nova Scotia bar in 1834, and to the New Brunswick bar in 1835. He was made a Queen's Counsel in 1863. He served as both judge and registrar of probate in Cumberland County for 20 years. In 1844, he married Mary Blair, one of Alexander Stewart's daughters. Dickey was a director of the Nova Scotia Electric Telegraph Company and consular agent for the United States at Amherst.

From 1858 to 1867, Dickey was appointed to the Legislative Council of Nova Scotia. In 1867, he was appointed to the Senate of Canada representing the senatorial division of Amherst, Nova Scotia. A Conservative, he served until his death in 1903.

His son Arthur Rupert Dickey served as a member of the House of Commons.

His daughter Mary married the English landscape architect Henry Ernest Milner.
