= 15th Nova Scotia general election =

15th Nova Scotia general election may refer to:

- Nova Scotia general election, 1836, the 15th general election to take place in the Colony of Nova Scotia, for the 15th General Assembly of Nova Scotia
- 1925 Nova Scotia general election, the 37th overall general election for Nova Scotia, for the (due to a counting error in 1859) 38th Legislative Assembly of Nova Scotia, but considered the 15th general election for the Canadian province of Nova Scotia
