= 19th Nova Scotia general election =

The 19th Nova Scotia general election may refer to:

- Nova Scotia general election, 1851, the 19th general election to take place in the Colony of Nova Scotia, for the 19th General Assembly of Nova Scotia
- 1941 Nova Scotia general election, the 41st overall general election for Nova Scotia, for the (due to a counting error in 1859) 42nd Legislative Assembly of Nova Scotia, but considered the 19th general election for the Canadian province of Nova Scotia
