= Henry Gates =

Henry Gates may refer to:

- Henry Louis Gates Jr. (born 1950), American literary critic
- Henry Gates (MP) (1515–1589), Member of Parliament (MP) for Yorkshire
- Henry Gates (Nova Scotia politician) (1790–1847), Methodist blacksmith and politician
