= 20th Nova Scotia general election =

20th Nova Scotia general election may refer to:

- Nova Scotia general election, 1855, the 20th general election to take place in the Colony of Nova Scotia, for the 20th General Assembly of Nova Scotia
- 1945 Nova Scotia general election, the 42nd overall general election for Nova Scotia, for the (due to a counting error in 1859) 43rd Legislative Assembly of Nova Scotia, but considered the 20th general election for the Canadian province of Nova Scotia.
