= 17th Nova Scotia general election =

17th Nova Scotia general election may refer to:

- Nova Scotia general election, 1843, the 17th general election to take place in the Colony of Nova Scotia, for the 17th General Assembly of Nova Scotia
- 1933 Nova Scotia general election, the 39th overall general election for Nova Scotia, for the (due to a counting error in 1859) 40th Legislative Assembly of Nova Scotia, but considered the 17th general election for the Canadian province of Nova Scotia.
