= 16th Nova Scotia general election =

16th Nova Scotia general election may refer to:

- Nova Scotia general election, 1840, the 16th general election to take place in the Colony of Nova Scotia, for the 16th General Assembly of Nova Scotia
- 1928 Nova Scotia general election, the 38th overall general election for Nova Scotia, for the (due to a counting error in 1859) 39th Legislative Assembly of Nova Scotia, but considered the 16th general election for the Canadian province of Nova Scotia.
