= Henry Hatton (disambiguation) =

Henry Hatton was a Nova Scotia politician in the 19th century.

Henry Hatton may also refer to:

- Henry Hatton (Irish politician), represented Fethard (County Wexford) (Parliament of Ireland constituency) in 1793
- Henry Hatton (MP for Wexford), represented Wexford (Parliament of Ireland constituency) in 1727

== See also ==
- Henry Finch-Hatton, 13th Earl of Winchilsea (1852–1927), English peer
