= Robert M. Cutler =

Canadian politician

Robert Mollison Cutler (October 9, 1784 – May 1, 1883) was a merchant and political figure in Nova Scotia. He represented Guysborough County in the Nova Scotia House of Assembly from 1818 to 1829.

He was born in Guysborough, Nova Scotia, the son of Thomas Cutler, and was educated there. In 1809, Cutler married Sophia Reynolds. He served as custos rotulorum for Guysborough County. In 1838, he was named to the province's Legislative Council. Cutler was also deputy prothonotary, crown clerk and postmaster.

His daughter Harriet married James Ballaine, who represented Sydney County in the provincial assembly. His daughter Maria married William Frederick DesBarres, a judge and also a member of the provincial assembly.
