= Union Bank of Halifax =

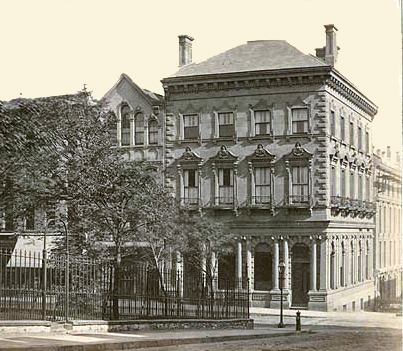
- Union Bank Halifax
- Industry: Banking
- Founded: 1856
- Defunct: 1910
- Fate: Merged into modern-day Royal Bank of Canada (RBC)
- Headquarters: Halifax, Nova Scotia, Canada
- Key people: First President: William Machin Stairs

The Union Bank of Halifax was granted a charter by the government of Canada in 1856 and established its head office at the corner of Hollis and Prince Streets in the port city of Halifax, Nova Scotia.

The driving force behind the bank, and its first chairman, was Halifax businessman and former mayor, William Machin Stairs (1789–1865). Amongst the Bank's other founders was John William Ritchie who served as director until 1866. In the nine years he was in charge, William Machin Stairs began an expansion of the bank that his successors continued. The Union Bank developed a strong regional branch network as well as offices in Trinidad and Puerto Rico that served the bank's clients with shipping and trading interests throughout the Caribbean. His son, William James Stairs served as president of the Bank from 1883 to 1898.

By the turn of the century, Montreal, and to a lesser degree Toronto, were becoming the financial centres for all of Canada. The Union Bank's executive at the time failed to recognize the need for expansion into the growing national market. Within a few years, increased competition from much larger financial institutions meant a merger with another bank was essential for survival. Therefore, in 1910, the board of directors of the Union Bank of Halifax accepted a takeover offer from the Royal Bank of Canada, then the country's third-largest bank.

The bank was known for the quality and fraternity of its employees. The noted financier Izaak Walton Killam began his business career in his hometown of Yarmouth, Nova Scotia as a junior clerk at the local branch of the Union Bank of Halifax.
