= Charles Rufus Fairbanks =

Canadian politician (1790–1841)

Charles Rufus Fairbanks (March 25, 1790 – April 15, 1841) was a lawyer, judge, entrepreneur and political figure in Nova Scotia, Canada. He represented Halifax township in the Nova Scotia House of Assembly from 1826 to 1836.

He was born in Halifax, the son of Rufus Fairbanks and Ann Prescott. Fairbanks was educated at King's College in Windsor and the Séminaire de Québec. He went on to study law with Simon Bradstreet Robie and was called to the bar in 1811. In 1815, he married Sarah Elizabeth, the daughter of William Lawson Sr. Fairbanks was secretary-treasurer for the Shubenacadie Canal Company. He served in the province's Executive Council as solicitor general. In 1834, he was named Master of the Rolls and judge in the vice admiralty court. He also served on the board of governors for King's College. Fairbanks died in Halifax after suffering a stroke at the age of 51.

His younger brother Samuel Prescott Fairbanks was also a lawyer and served in the provincial assembly.
