= Peleg Wiswall =

American lawyer

- Born: April 8, 1763; Falmouth, Maine. USA
- Died: September 18, 1836 (aged 73); Annapolis Royal, Nova Scotia, Canada
- Occupations: Lawyer, judge, political figure

Peleg Wiswall (April 8, 1763 – September 18, 1836) was a lawyer, judge and political figure in Nova Scotia. He represented Annapolis County in the Nova Scotia House of Assembly from 1812 to 1816.

He was born in April 1763 in Falmouth, Maine (now Portland), the son of the Reverend John Wiswall and Mercy Minot. Wiswall married Mary Nichols. In 1816, he was named associate judge for the Supreme Court of Nova Scotia. Wiswall worked with the Abbé Jean-Mandé Sigogne during the 1820s and 1830s to establish an experimental Mi'kmaq settlement at Bear River. He died in Annapolis at the age of 74.

His daughter Mary married Charles Budd, who also served in the provincial assembly.
