= Richard McHeffy =

Canadian politician

Richard A. McHeffey (circa 1800 – December 5, 1874) was a political figure in Nova Scotia and a member of the Liberal Party. He was born in Windsor Township, Nova Scotia.

On March 26, 1831, Richard married Jane Hill, the daughter of Robert Hill and Elizabeth Cleveland of Windsor, and their children included:

1. Charles, born 1834, who married Ellen Vesch Maxner
2. Katherine (or Kathleen) Elizabeth, who married Alfred C. Thomas in 1862
3. George, born circa 1840, who married Ellen Hayes
4. Mary, born circa 1843, who married Mr. Moffatt
5. Jesse, born circa 1846, who married W. Inglis Moffatt, Esq
6. Anne, born circa 1848
7. Isabelle, born 1851, who married James Alexander Dickey, son of Hon Robert Barry Dickie of Amherst

His surname also appears as McHeffy. He represented the township of Windsor in the Nova Scotia House of Assembly from 1838 to 1840 and was called to the province's Legislative Council in 1853.

When Hiram Blanchard tendered the resignation of his government in 1867, after being defeated by Joseph Howe's Anti-Confederation Party, Lieutenant-Governor Charles Hastings Doyle called upon McHeffey to form the administration of the new government. McHeffey had long been a respected member of Nova Scotia's Liberal Party, but held no conspicuous position at the time of his appointment that would mark him for political leadership. He nonetheless undertook the task and called at once for a meeting of the anti-confederate members of the Assembly and of the Legislative Council at Halifax. At Halifax, McHeffey successfully formed an administration for the new government under the leadership of William Annand.

McHeffey became minister without portfolio in the Executive Council. He served as custos rotulorum for Hants County and was also a senior Grand Warden in the province's Freemasons. He died in Windsor at the age of 100.

His grandson Francis R. Parker also served in the provincial assembly.
