= William Machin Stairs =

Canadian politician (1789–1865)

- Born: January 21, 1789; Halifax, Nova Scotia, Canada
- Died: November 28, 1865 (aged 76); Halifax, Nova Scotia, Canada
- Resting place: Camp Hill Cemetery
- Education: Halifax Grammar School
- Occupations: Merchant, Banker, Politician
- Political party: Tory, Reformers
- Spouse: Margaret Wiseman
- Children: Catherine, Joanna, William J., John George, John, Margaret, Helen, Frances, Anna
- Parent(s): John Stairs & Joanna Stayner

William Machin Stairs (January 21, 1789 – November 28, 1865) was a merchant, a banker, and a statesman. He was born and died in Halifax, Nova Scotia, Canada.

William Machin Stairs was the son of John Stairs (1749–1797), a native of Grenada who had emigrated to Philadelphia, Pennsylvania, United States before moving to Halifax. John Stairs became involved in the shipping business but after some financial difficulties the family returned to Philadelphia in 1793. There, both John Stairs and his wife died and their five children, including the eight-year-old William Machin Stairs, returned to Halifax to be raised by a maternal uncle.

In 1810, Stairs opened a small general store on the Halifax waterfront that marked the beginnings of a business dynasty that endured to 1975. In 1856, he helped found the Union Bank of Halifax. A major shareholder, he served on the bank's board of directors and as the bank's first president.

Stairs was also active in politics, serving as a Member of the Nova Scotia General Assembly from 1841 to 1843, then as mayor of Halifax from 1847 to 1848 and later as a Legislative Councillor. He would become a strong supporter of Joseph Howe in his Anti-Confederation Party movement.

A member of the Glasite Christian church, William Machin Stairs was married to Margaret Wiseman (1793–1850) with whom he had nine children. They are buried together at the Camp Hill Cemetery, in Halifax.

Nova Scotia House of Assembly
Preceded by Thomas Forrester	Member of the Legislature for Halifax; 1841-1843; With: James McNab	Succeeded by James McNab; Andrew M. Uniacke
