= Matthew Archibald =

Nova Scotia politician (1745–1820)

Matthew Archibald (1745 – January 18, 1820) was an Irish-born politician, tanner and farmer in Nova Scotia. He represented Truro Township in the Nova Scotia House of Assembly from 1785 to 1799.

He was born in Derry, Northern Ireland, the son of Samuel Archibald and Eleanor Taylor, and came with his family to Londonderry, New Hampshire in 1757. The family moved to Nova Scotia five years later. In 1767, Archibald married Janet Fisher. He was named a justice of the peace and became coroner for Colchester District in 1786. He lived at Bible Hill; Archibald is believed to have given the town its name. Bible Hill continues to celebrate a festival in Archibald's honor yearly to commemorate his birthday. Archibald died in Truro.

Matthew Archibald participated in the slave trade, a large part of Canadian history that is often ignored; in 1779 he purchased one 12 year old black boy, Abram, from Matthew Harris of Pictou.

His son Alexander Lackie Archibald also represented Truro in the assembly.
