= Hiram Hyde =

Canadian politician

Hiram Hyde (September 25, 1817 – December 18, 1907) was a stagecoach operator and political figure in Nova Scotia. He represented Truro township in the Nova Scotia House of Assembly from 1855 to 1859 as a Liberal-Conservative member.

He was born in Richmond County, New York, the son of Roswell Hyde, and came to British North America in 1833. He operated a stagecoach there and transported British troops to battle during the Lower Canada Rebellion of 1837. Hyde came to Nova Scotia in 1841 and was hired by Samuel Cunard to transport mail between Halifax and Truro. He later established his own business servicing that route. In 1851, he won a contract to transport mail between West River and Sydney but he lost the contract to one of his drivers in 1860. He later operated a route between Pictou and Arichat. Hyde built the first telegraph line in the province during the 1850s. He was married twice: his wife Esther Ann died in 1882. Hyde died in Truro at the age of 90.
