= Henry Gates (Nova Scotia politician) =

Canadian politician

Henry Gates (1790 – 3 November 1847) was a Methodist blacksmith and politician in the Township of Annapolis, Nova Scotia. He represented the Township of Annapolis in the 16th General Assembly of Nova Scotia (1840–1843). He also led a company in the militia as captain. As a Reform candidate he defeated Mr. Alfred Whitman but in 1843 was defeated by the same.

Henry Gates was the tenth of ten children of Jonas Gates (1752–1832) and Hepzibah Baker. Jonas Gates was the son of Oldham Gates (1716–1816), an immigrant from Massachusetts, and early settler and shipbuilder in Annapolis in Nova Scotia. Henry Gates married twice, first to Mary Van Horne Tupper, second to Mercy Berteaux. He had eight children, four sons, four daughters.
