= General Assembly of Nova Scotia =

Legislature of Canadian province

- 65th General Assembly of Nova Scotia

Type
- Type: Bicameral (1758–1928); Unicameral (1928–present)
- Houses: Council (1758–1838); Legislative Council (1838–1928); House of Assembly (1758–present)
- Sovereign: The lieutenant governor (representing the King of Canada)

History
- Founded: 1758

Meeting place
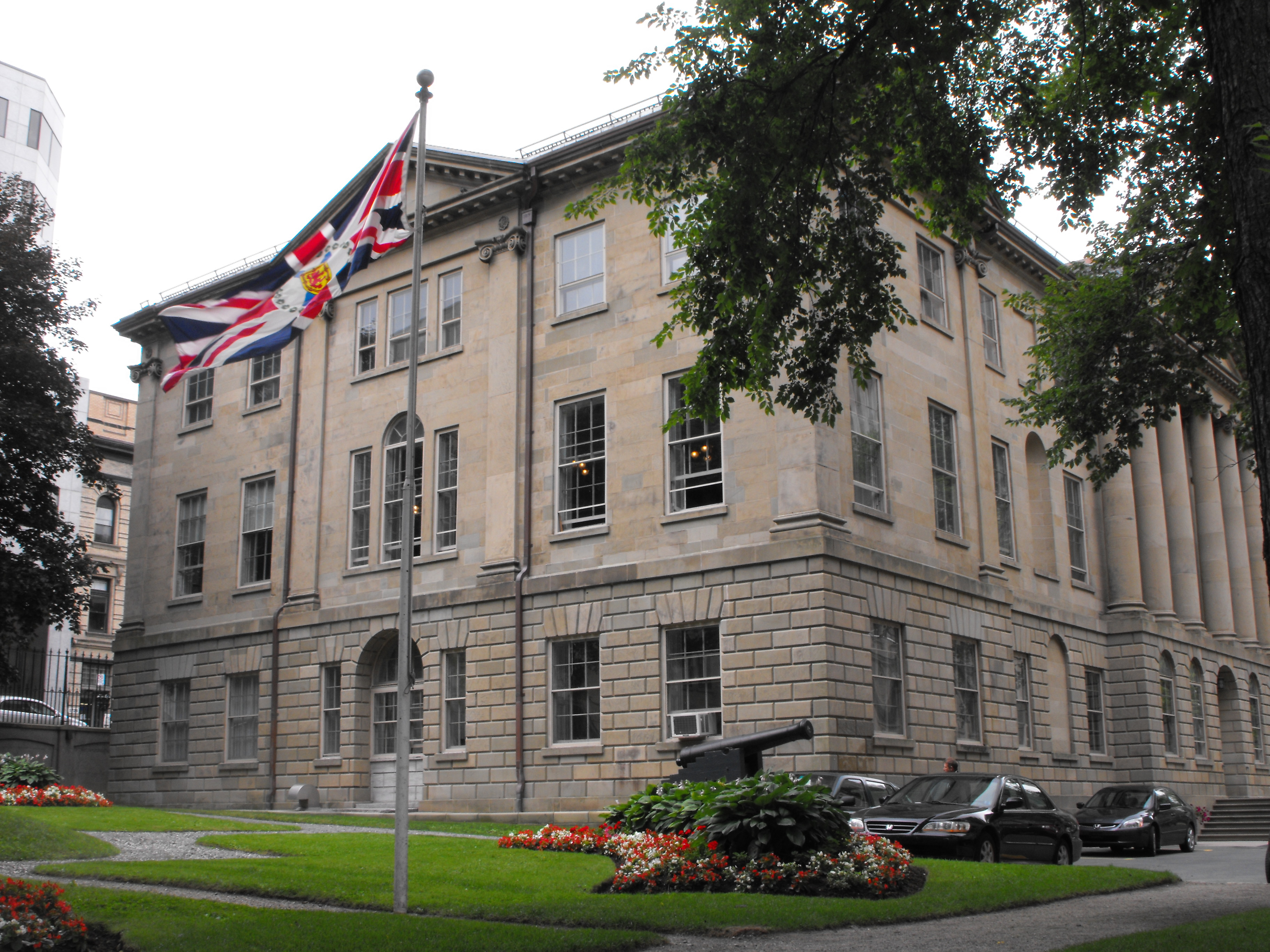
- Province House, Halifax, Nova Scotia, Canada

The General Assembly of Nova Scotia is the legislature of the province of Nova Scotia. It consists of one or more sessions and comes to an end upon dissolution (or constitutionally by the effluxion of time — approximately five years) and an ensuing general election. Today, the unicameral legislature is made up of two elements: the lieutenant governor (representing the King of Canada) and a legislative assembly called the House of Assembly. The legislature was first established in 1758.

Like at the Canadian federal level, Nova Scotia uses a Westminster-style parliamentary government, in which members are elected to the House of Assembly in general elections and the leader of the party with the confidence of the Assembly (normally the party with the most seats) becomes the premier of Nova Scotia and chooses the Executive Council from amongst the party's members of the Assembly. Government is carried out in the name of the king, represented by the lieutenant governor, acting on the advice of the Executive Council (the Governor in Council).

The legislature was originally bicameral. From 1758 to 1838, it had an upper house called the Council, which also held executive functions. In 1838, the Council's executive functions were given to an Executive Council, and the upper house was renamed the Legislative Council. That house was abolished in 1928.

== List of Assemblies ==
Data before 1984 summarized from: Elliott, Shirley B. (1984). "Appendix A: Assembly Lists". The Legislative Assembly of Nova Scotia, 1758-1983: a biographical directory (PDF). Halifax: Province of Nova Scotia. ISBN 0-88871-050-X.

=== Post-Confederation ===
Assembly	Election	Convened	Dissolution	Sessions	Members
65th General Assembly of Nova Scotia	November 26, 2024	December 10, 2024			55 (before 2026); 56 (since 2026)
64th General Assembly of Nova Scotia	August 17, 2021	September 24, 2021	October 27, 2024	1	55
63rd General Assembly of Nova Scotia	May 30, 2017	June 16, 2017	July 17, 2021	3	51
62nd General Assembly of Nova Scotia	October 8, 2013	October 24, 2013	April 30, 2017	3	51
61st General Assembly of Nova Scotia	June 9, 2009	June 25, 2009	September 7, 2013	2	52
60th General Assembly of Nova Scotia	June 13, 2006	June 29, 2006	May 5, 2009	2	52
59th General Assembly of Nova Scotia	August 5, 2003	September 4, 2003	May 13, 2006	2	52
58th General Assembly of Nova Scotia	July 27, 1999	August 2, 1999	July 5, 2003	3	52
57th General Assembly of Nova Scotia	March 24, 1998	May 21, 1998	June 18, 1999	1	52
56th General Assembly of Nova Scotia	May 25, 1993	June 28, 1993	February 12, 1998	6	52
55th General Assembly of Nova Scotia	September 6, 1988	February 23, 1989	April 16, 1993	3	52
54th General Assembly of Nova Scotia	November 6, 1984	February 28, 1985	July 30, 1988	4	52
53rd General Assembly of Nova Scotia	October 6, 1981	February 18, 1982	September 28, 1984	3	52
52nd General Assembly of Nova Scotia	September 19, 1978	December 7, 1978	August 28, 1981	3	52
51st General Assembly of Nova Scotia	April 2, 1974	May 23, 1974	August 12, 1978	5	46
50th General Assembly of Nova Scotia	October 13, 1970	December 10, 1970	February 23, 1974	4	46
49th General Assembly of Nova Scotia	May 30, 1967	December 1, 1967	September 5, 1970	3	46
48th General Assembly of Nova Scotia	October 8, 1963	February 6, 1964	April 20, 1967	5	43
47th General Assembly of Nova Scotia	June 7, 1960	February 8, 1961	August 29, 1963	3	43
46th General Assembly of Nova Scotia	October 30, 1956	February 27, 1957	April 16, 1960	4	43
45th General Assembly of Nova Scotia	May 26, 1953	February 24, 1954	September 10, 1956	3	37
44th General Assembly of Nova Scotia	June 9, 1949	March 21, 1950	April 14, 1953	4	37
43rd General Assembly of Nova Scotia	October 23, 1945	March 14, 1946	April 27, 1949	4	30
42nd General Assembly of Nova Scotia	October 28, 1941	February 19, 1942	September 12, 1945	4	30
41st General Assembly of Nova Scotia	June 29, 1937	March 1, 1938	September 19, 1941	4	30
40th General Assembly of Nova Scotia	August 22, 1933	March 1, 1934	May 20, 1937	4	30
39th General Assembly of Nova Scotia	October 1, 1928	February 27, 1929	July 13, 1933	5	43
38th General Assembly of Nova Scotia	June 25, 1925	February 9, 1926	September 5, 1928	3	43
37th General Assembly of Nova Scotia	July 27, 1920	March 9, 1921	June 2, 1925	5	43
36th General Assembly of Nova Scotia	June 20, 1916	February 22, 1917	June 28, 1920	4	43
35th General Assembly of Nova Scotia	June 14, 1911	February 22, 1912	May 22, 1916	5	38
34th General Assembly of Nova Scotia	June 20, 1906	February 14, 1907	May 15, 1911	5	38
33rd General Assembly of Nova Scotia	October 2, 1901	February 13, 1902	May 22, 1906	5	
32nd General Assembly of Nova Scotia	April 20, 1897	January 27, 1898	September 3, 1901	4	
31st General Assembly of Nova Scotia	March 15, 1894	January 31, 1895	March 20, 1897	3	38
30th General Assembly of Nova Scotia	May 21, 1890	April 2, 1891	February 14, 1894	4	38
29th General Assembly of Nova Scotia	June 15, 1886	March 10, 1887	April 21, 1890	4	
28th General Assembly of Nova Scotia	June 20, 1882	February 8, 1883	May 20, 1886	4	
27th General Assembly of Nova Scotia	September 17, 1878	March 6, 1879	May 23, 1882	4	
26th General Assembly of Nova Scotia	December 17, 1874	March 11, 1875	August 21, 1878	4	
25th General Assembly of Nova Scotia	May 16, 1871	February 22, 1872	November 23, 1874	3	
24th General Assembly of Nova Scotia	September 18, 1867	January 30, 1868	April 17, 1871	4	38

=== Pre-Confederation ===
Assembly	Election	Convened	Dissolution	Sessions	Members
23rd General Assembly of Nova Scotia	May 28, 1863	February 4, 1864	June 10, 1867	4	
22nd General Assembly of Nova Scotia	May 12, 1859	January 26, 1860	May 1, 1863	4	55
21st General Assembly of Nova Scotia	By error, the 21st General Assembly was called the "22nd."				
20th General Assembly of Nova Scotia	May 22, 1855	January 31, 1856	April 15, 1859	4	53
19th General Assembly of Nova Scotia	August 28, 1851	November 4, 1851	April 25, 1855	5	53
18th General Assembly of Nova Scotia	August 5, 1847	January 22, 1848	July 26, 1851	4	51
Assembly	Writ issued	Convened	Dissolution	Sessions	Members
17th General Assembly of Nova Scotia	October 30, 1843	February 8, 1844	June 23, 1847	5	51
16th General Assembly of Nova Scotia	October 21, 1840	February 3, 1841	October 26, 1843	3	51
15th General Assembly of Nova Scotia	November 2, 1836	January 31, 1837	October 21, 1840	5	49
14th General Assembly of Nova Scotia	August 25, 1830	November 8, 1830	November 2, 1836	6	41/44
13th General Assembly of Nova Scotia	April 17, 1826	February 1, 1827	August 18, 1830	4	
12th General Assembly of Nova Scotia	April 28, 1820	December 12, 1820	April 11, 1826	6	
11th General Assembly of Nova Scotia	May 18, 1818	February 11, 1819	April 20, 1820	2	39
10th General Assembly of Nova Scotia	August 17, 1811	February 6, 1812	May 11, 1818	8	
9th General Assembly of Nova Scotia	May 29, 1806	November 18, 1806	August 14, 1811	7	
8th General Assembly of Nova Scotia	October 21, 1799	February 20, 1800	May 28, 1806	6	
7th General Assembly of Nova Scotia	January 22, 1793	March 20, 1793	October 11, 1799	7	
6th General Assembly of Nova Scotia	October 21, 1785	December 5, 1785	January 22, 1793	7	
5th General Assembly of Nova Scotia	April 18, 1770	June 6, 1770	October 20, 1785	17	
4th General Assembly of Nova Scotia	February 2, 1765	May 28, 1765	April 2, 1770	8	27/33
3rd General Assembly of Nova Scotia	February 28, 1761	July 1, 1761	January 30, 1765	6	24/28
2nd General Assembly of Nova Scotia	August 23, 1759	December 4, 1759	October 25, 1760	2	22
1st General Assembly of Nova Scotia	May 20, 1758	October 2, 1758	August 13, 1759	2	22

== See also ==
- List of Nova Scotia provincial electoral districts
- Nova Scotia Council
