= Chipman Creek =

Chipman Creek may refer to:

- Chipman Creek (Alberta), a stream in Alberta, Canada
- Chipman Creek (British Columbia), a stream in British Columbia, Canada

== See also ==
- Chapman Creek, a stream in Pennsylvania, United States
