= William Chipman =

William Chipman may refer to:

- William Allen Chipman (1757–1845), Nova Scotian lawyer, judge and politician
- William Everett Chipman (1822–1893), American politician
- William Henry Chipman (1807–1870), Canadian politician
