= Samuel Creelman =

Canadian politician

Samuel Creelman (November 19, 1808 – June 5, 1891) was a farmer, merchant and political figure in Nova Scotia. He represented Colchester County from 1847 to 1851 and Truro Township from 1851 to 1855 in the Nova Scotia House of Assembly.

Creelman was born in Upper Stewiacke Township, Nova Scotia, the son of William Creelman and Hannah Tupper. He taught for several years before becoming a merchant in Stewiacke. Creelman married Elizabeth Elliott Ellis in 1834. He then took over the operation of his father's farm, also investing in land and mortgages. Creelman also was a shareholder and part owner of woollen mills. He served as a justice of the peace. Creelman was the province's financial secretary from 1851 to 1856. He served as a member of the province's Legislative Council from 1860 to 1862.

Creelman was named gold commissioner for the province in 1862. Although originally a Liberal, he later supported Confederation and became a Liberal-Conservative. He was named to the Legislative Council again in 1867 and was commissioner of mines and public works from 1878 to 1882. Creelman was a prominent member of the Sons of Temperance, YMCA and the Nova Scotia Bible Society. He died on his farm in Upper Stewiacke at the age of 82.
