= Obadiah Wilson =

Nova Scotian politician (c. 1800–1850)

Obadiah Wilson (ca 1800 – August 3, 1850) was a merchant and political figure in Nova Scotia. He represented Shelburne County in the Nova Scotia House of Assembly from 1843 to 1847 as a Reformer. His name also appears as Obediah Wilson.

He was the son of Obediah Wilson. In 1830, he married Sarah Killam.
