= Henry Bailey (Canadian politician) =

Canadian politician

Henry Bailey (1818–1897) was a politician in Nova Scotia. He represented the township of Lunenburg from 1855 to 1859 and Lunenburg County from 1859 to 1863 in the Nova Scotia House of Assembly.

Bailey served as registrar of deeds for Lunenburg County from 1871 to 1897.
