= Chipman Creek (Alberta) =

Stream in Alberta, Canada

Coordinates: 49.43328°N 114.03522°W

Chipman Creek is a stream in Alberta, Canada.

Chipman Creek is named for J. E. Chipman, a cattleman.

== See also ==
- List of rivers of Alberta
