= Joseph Freeman (politician) =

Canadian politician

Joseph Freeman (29 November 1765 – 8 May 1837) was a seaman, merchant and political figure in Nova Scotia. He represented the Liverpool Township from 1811 to 1820 and Queens County from 1820 to 1837 in the Nova Scotia House of Assembly.

He was the son of Joseph Freeman, who came to Nova Scotia from New England. Freeman commanded a number of British vessels during wars with France and Spain, as well as during the War of 1812. As a merchant, he was involved in the fishing trade and trade with the West Indies. Freeman also served as a justice in the Inferior Court of Common Pleas for Queen's County.

His son Snow P. Freeman also served in the provincial assembly. His daughter Elizabeth married James Ratchford DeWolf.
