= George Ernst =

Canadian politician and merchant (1788–1853)

George Ernst (1788 – September 25, 1853) was a merchant and political figure in Nova Scotia. He represented Lunenburg County in the Nova Scotia House of Assembly from 1847 to 1851.

Ernst married Elizabeth Jane Jones in 1812. He was an innkeeper and owned a sawmill. He served as a justice of the peace. Ernst died at the age of 65 in Mahone Bay.
