= Henry Yeomans Mott =

Canadian politician

Henry Yeomans Mott (September 4, 1796 – January 31, 1866) was a manufacturer and political figure in Nova Scotia. He represented Halifax County in the Legislative Assembly of Nova Scotia from 1841 to 1851.

He was born in Halifax, Nova Scotia, the son of John Mott and Deborah Webb. In 1819, Mott married Elizabeth Prescott. The family was among the first to manufacture chocolate in Canada. Mott served as a justice of the peace from about 1833 until his death in Dartmouth at the age of 69.
