= Moses Shaw (Canadian politician) =

Canadian politician

Moses Shaw (April 13, 1809 – January 24, 1870) was a merchant and political figure in Nova Scotia. He represented Annapolis township from 1859 to 1859 and Annapolis County from 1859 to 1863 as a Liberal-Conservative and then a Reformer.

He was born in Magaguadavic, New Brunswick, the son of Moses Shaw and Phebe Moore. Shaw was married twice: to Cornelia Gesner in 1833 and then to Elizabeth Spurr in 1837. He was a justice of the peace for Annapolis County. He was first elected to the provincial assembly in an 1858 by-election held after Alfred Whitman was named to the Legislative Council. Shaw was defeated when he ran for reelection in 1863. He died in Clementsport, Nova Scotia at the age of 60.
