= Zenas Waterman =

Nova Scotian farmer and politician

Zenas Waterman (1789–1869) was a Nova Scotian farmer and politician. He represented Queens County in the Nova Scotia House of Assembly from 1838 until his defeat in 1840. Waterman was the founder of the Congregational Church in Pleasant River on 4 August, 1856. He was the son of Zenas Waterman (1762–1852), who founded the community of Pleasant River, Nova Scotia.
