= Henry Mignowitz =

Canadian politician (1799–1869)

Henry Mignowitz (1799 – May 17, 1869) was a dry goods merchant and political figure in Nova Scotia. He represented Lunenburg County in the Nova Scotia House of Assembly from 1847 to 1851.

He married Eliza Sarah Muncey in 1821. His advertisement in Hutchinson's Nova Scotia directory describes his company as "importers of British and foreign dry goods" He served on the town council for Halifax from 1844 to 1848 and again in 1858. Mignowitz died in Halifax.
