= Gilbert McKenna =

Canadian politician (1800–post-1877)

Gilbert McKenna (1800 – after 1877) was a political figure in Nova Scotia, Canada. He represented Shelburne County in the Nova Scotia House of Assembly from 1840 to 1843 and from 1847 to 1851.

He was born in Shelburne, Nova Scotia, the son of Duncan McKenna, a United Empire Loyalist originally from Scotland. McKenna was educated in Shelburne and Halifax. In 1846, he married Mary Stalker. McKenna was called to the province's Legislative Council in 1868.
