= George Smith (Nova Scotia politician) =

Scottish-born Canadian politician (died 1850)

George Smith (died November 14, 1850) was a Scottish-born Canadian merchant, shipbuilder, and politician. He represented Halifax County from 1819 to 1836, Pictou County from 1836 to 1838, and Pictou township from 1843 to 1845.

Smith was born in Banff. Smith was involved in the timber trade. He served as a member of the province's Legislative Council from 1838 to 1843. Smith was a probate judge for Pictou County from 1849 to 1850, a judge in the Supreme Court of Nova Scotia and custos rotulorum for the county.
