= Chipman Parish, New Brunswick =

Coordinates: 46.2454°N 65.8216°W

Chipman
- Parish
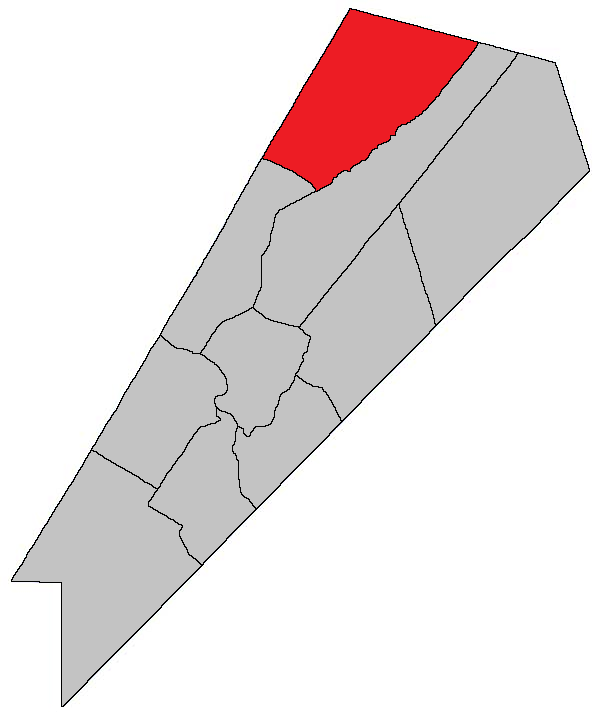
- Location within Queens County, New Brunswick.
- Country: Canada
- Province: New Brunswick
- County: Queens County
- Erected: 1835

Area
  - Land: 483.45 km^{2} (186.66 sq mi)

Population (2021)
  - Total: 853
  - Density: 1.8/km^{2} (4.7/sq mi)
  - Change 2016-2021: ▼6.6%
  - Dwellings: 504
- Time zone: UTC-4 (AST)
  - Summer (DST): UTC-3 (ADT)
- Figures do not include portion within the village of Chipman

Chipman is a geographic parish in Queens County, New Brunswick, Canada.

Prior to the 2023 governance reform, for governance purposes it was divided between the village of Chipman and the local service district of the parish of Chipman, both of which were members of Capital Region Service Commission (RSC11).

== Origin of name ==
The parish was named for Ward Chipman Jr., Chief Justice of New Brunswick at the time of its erection.

== History ==
Chipman was erected in 1835 from Brunswick and Canning Parishes.

In 1855 all of Chipman southeast of Coal Creek was transferred to Waterborough Parish.

In 1896 the boundary with Waterborough was altered, parallelling the Brunswick line from the mouth of North Branch Coal Creek to the county line; the lost territory became part of Waterborough.

== Boundaries ==
Chipman Parish is bounded:

- on the northeast by the Kent County line;
- on the southeast by a line beginning on the county line at a point about 5.5 kilometres southeasterly of Route 116, then running southwesterly along a line parallel to the northwestern line of Brunswick Parish, which is a line running north 54º east (Note: By the magnet of 1786, when declination at the starting point was a bit more than 14º west of north.) from a point on the Saint John River about 1.8 kilometres southwest of the Route 715 bridge over McAlpines Brook, until striking Coal Creek at the southeast angle of a grant to Malcolm Carmichael upstream of the mouth of the South Branch Coal Creek, then down Coal Creek to the Northeast Arm of Grand Lake;
- on the southwest by a line running northwesterly from the Northeast Arm to Indian Point, then across Salmon Bay to strike land northeast of Newcastle Centre, then north 45º west (Note: By the magnet of 1835, when declination in the area was about 17º west of north. The Territorial Division Act clause referring to magnetic direction bearings was omitted in the 1952) past the Post Road and the old CPR line before turning nearly west and running about 400 metres to the Sunbury County line;
- on the northwest by the Sunbury County line.

== Communities ==
Communities at least partly within the parish. bold indicates an incorporated municipality

- Briggs Corner
- Bronson
- Bronson Settlement
- Camp Wegesegum
- Castaway
- **Chipman**
- Coal Creek
- Dufferin
- Fowlers Corner
- Gaspereau Forks
- Harley Road
- Iron Bound Cove
- Kings Mines
- Midland
- Redbank
- Salmon Creek
- The Ridge
- Upper Gaspereau

== Bodies of water ==
Bodies of water (Note: Not including brooks, ponds or coves.) at least partly within the parish.

- Gaspereau River
- Salmon River
- Castaway Stream
- Iron Bound Cove Stream
- North Forks Stream
- Coal Creek
- Long Creek
- Redbank Creek
- Salmon Creek
- Grand Lake
  - Northeast Arm
  - Salmon Bay

== Islands ==
Islands at least partly within the parish.

- Curley Island
- Long Island

== Other notable places ==
Parks, historic sites, and other noteworthy places at least partly within the parish.

- Chipman Airport

== Demographics ==
Parish population total does not include former incorporated village of Chipman. Revised census figures based on the 2023 local governance reforms have not been released.

=== Population ===
Population trend

Census	Population	Change (%)
2016	913	▼5.1%
2011	962	▼8.9%
2006	1,056	▼5.0%
2001	1,111	

=== Language ===
Mother tongue (2016)

Language	Population	Pct (%)
English only	880	96.2%
French only	25	2.7%
Both English and French	0	0%
Other languages	10	1.1%

== Access Routes ==
Highways and numbered routes that run through the parish, including external routes that start or finish at the parish limits:

- **Highways**
  - Route 10
- **Principal Routes**
  - Route 116
  - Route 123
- Secondary Routes:
  - None
- External Routes:
  - None

== See also ==
- List of parishes in New Brunswick
