= Thomas Cutler (Canadian politician) =

Canadian politician

Thomas Cutler (November 11, 1752 – February 8, 1837) was a lawyer, judge, merchant and political figure in Nova Scotia. He represented Sydney County in the Nova Scotia House of Assembly from 1793 to 1799.

He was born in Boston, Massachusetts, the son of Thomas Cutler and Sarah Reade. He was educated at Yale College and settled at Hatfield, Massachusetts. Cutler joined the British forces at the start of the American Revolution. He was named in the Massachusetts Banishment Act of 1778. Cutler married Elizabeth Goldsbury in 1783 and they settled in Nova Scotia later that year. He was named a justice of the peace and served as the first town clerk for Guysborough. Cutler also later served as probate judge for Sydney County and a justice in the Inferior Court of Common Pleas. He also became lieutenant-colonel in the county militia. He died at Guysborough at the age of 84.

His son Robert M. Cutler also served in the provincial assembly.
