= Francis R. Parker =

Canadian politician

Frances R. Parker (1800 – August 21, 1894) was a farmer, lawyer and political figure in Nova Scotia. He represented Hants County from 1855 to 1859 and Colchester County from 1863 to 1867 in the Nova Scotia House of Assembly as a Reformer.

He was born in Newport, Nova Scotia, the son of Thomas Parker and Mary McHeffey, the daughter of Richard McHeffey. Parker was married twice: first to Mary Anne McHeffey and then to Elizabeth Etter. He was a magistrate for Colchester County from 1824 to 1894. Parker died in Shubenacadie, Nova Scotia.
