= Jesse Shaw =

American educator

MLA for Yarmouth township
- In office 1851–1855

Personal details
- Born: January 17, 1800 Yarmouth, Nova Scotia
- Died: February 24, 1867 (aged 67) Hebron, Nova Scotia
- Spouse: Anna Tedford
- Occupation: Politician

Jesse Shaw (January 7, 1800 – February 24, 1867) was a farmer and public figure in pre-Confederation Nova Scotia.

== Personal life ==
He was born in Yarmouth, Nova Scotia, the son of Zebina Shaw and Elizabeth Brown. Shaw married Anna Tedford. He served as justice of the peace from 1854 to 1867 and was elected as a Reformer to the Nova Scotia House of Assembly representing Yarmouth Township in 1851. He also served as a member of the municipal council for Yarmouth from 1886 to 1888. He died in Hebron, Nova Scotia at the age of 67.
