= Edward Zwicker =

Canadian politician

Edward Zwicker (1812 – October 30, 1859) was a merchant and political figure in Nova Scotia. He represented Lunenburg County in the Nova Scotia House of Assembly from 1840 to 1843.

He was born in Lunenburg, Nova Scotia, the son of John Zwicker and Fredericka L. Rudolph. He was involved in exporting fish and the trade in the West Indies. Zwicker died in Lunenburg.
