= Thomas Horace Fuller =

Canadian politician

Thomas Horace Fuller (ca. 1816 – August 24, 1861) was a lawyer and political figure in Nova Scotia. He represented Richmond County in the Nova Scotia House of Assembly from 1855 to 1859.

He was born on Cape Breton Island, the son of John Fuller and Mary Oakley, and studied law, becoming an attorney in 1847 and a barrister the following year. In 1849, he married Margaret Lanigan. From 1850 to 1859, Fuller was registrar of probate for Richmond County. He was also named commissioner for supervising the construction of the St Peters Canal, serving until 1856. After he ran unsuccessfully for reelection in 1859, Fuller returned to the practice of law at Arichat where he died.
