= Lewis Payzant =

Nova Scotian politician

Lewis Juhan Payzant (1807 – November 11, 1883) was a farmer and political figure in Nova Scotia. He represented Falmouth township from 1840 to 1843 in the Nova Scotia House of Assembly.

He was born in Falmouth, Nova Scotia, the son of Elias Payzant and Ann Martin. Payzant never married. He died in Falmouth.
