= William Holland (politician) =

William Holland (born 1782) was an Irish-born farmer and politician in Nova Scotia. He represented Annapolis County in the Nova Scotia House of Assembly from 1836 to 1840.

He was born in Armagh, where he married Miss Reilly. In 1812, Holland and his family boarded a ship bound for New York City. The vessel was captured by a British war ship and taken to Halifax. At that point, Holland decided to settle at Wilmot in Annapolis County. He was a promoter of the Methodist church in the area. After his term in the provincial assembly, he returned to the operation of his farm.
