= Josiah Coffin =

Canadian politician

Josiah Coffin (1804 – August 20, 1887) was a blacksmith and political figure in Nova Scotia. He represented Barrington township in the Nova Scotia House of Assembly from 1851 to 1855.

He was the son of Seth Coffin and Elizabeth Barlow. In 1828, he married Maria Doane. Coffin was a justice of the peace and served as custos rotulorum for Barrington from 1857 to 1885. He was a probate judge for Barrington district from 1866 to 1887. He died at Barrington Head.
