= Peter Spearwater =

Canadian politician

Peter Spearwater (1790–1855) was a political figure in Nova Scotia. He represented the township of Shelburne in the Nova Scotia House of Assembly from 1836 to 1847.

He was born in Mahone Bay, Nova Scotia, the son of John Peter Spearwater and Magdalena Ritcey. He served in the local militia and arrested François-Lambert Bourneuf, at the time an escaped prisoner; Bourneuf later became a member of the provincial assembly. Spearwater married Eliza Richardson.
