= John Esson =

Canadian politician

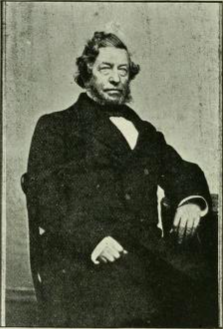
John Esson, Halifax, Nova Scotia

John Esson (November 6, 1800 – March 4, 1860) was a merchant and politician in Nova Scotia. He represented Halifax County in the Nova Scotia House of Assembly from 1851 to 1863 as a Reformer. He also served as the president of the North British Society.

He was born in Aberdeen, Scotland, the son of Charles Esson and Elizabeth White, and came to Halifax around 1823. He learned the grocery trade from his uncle and later set up his own store, going on to establish a wholesale grocery firm. In 1836, he married Harriet Ann Leonard. Esson served as the president of the Halifax Fire Insurance Company from 1858 to 1863; Esson was chair of the province's public accounts from 1850 to 1860. He died in office in Halifax at the age of 49.
