= Perez Benjamin =

Nova Scotian politician (1791–1850)

Perez Martain Benjamin (October 23, 1791 – August 4, 1850) was a farmer and political figure in Nova Scotia. He represented Horton township in the Nova Scotia House of Assembly from 1836 to 1840 and from 1843 to 1847 as a Reformer.

He was born in Horton, Nova Scotia, the son of Abel Benjamin and Eunice Rand. In 1815, Benjamin married Sarah Stephens. He died in Horton at the age of 58.
