= James B. Holdsworth =

Canadian politician

James Bourne Holdsworth (c. 1796 – March 24, 1859) was a merchant, farmer and political figure in Nova Scotia. He represented the township of Digby from 1836 to 1843 and Digby County from 1840 to 1843 in the Nova Scotia House of Assembly as a Reformer.

He was the son of John Holdsworth, a United Empire Loyalist, and Mehitable Bourne. Holdsworth served as commissioner of the peace and became custos rotulorum in 1848. He died in Digby at the age of 63.
