= John Chipman =

John Chipman may refer to:

- John Chipman (Nova Scotia politician) (1744–1836), judge and politician in Nova Scotia
- John Smith Chipman (1800–1869), lawyer and U.S. representative from Michigan
- J. Logan Chipman (1830–1893), lawyer and U.S. representative from Michigan
- John Chipman (metallurgist) (1897–1983), U.S. physical chemist and metallurgist.
- John Chipman (economist) (1926–2022), Canadian economist
- John Chipman (international relations expert) (born 1957), director-general and chief executive of the International Institute for Strategic Studies
