= Samuel B. Chipman =

Canadian politician

Samuel Bishop Chipman (August 2, 1803 – August 22, 1855) was a merchant and political figure in Nova Scotia. He represented Annapolis County in the Nova Scotia House of Assembly from 1840 to 1843 as a Reformer.

He was the son of Major Chipman, the son of Handley Chipman, and Elizabeth Bishop. He is the owner of a country store in Lawrencetown. He married Levicia Marshall. Chipman was defeated by James William Johnston when he ran for reelection in 1843. He served as postmaster at Lawerencetown and was also a commissioner of the peace.
