= John Crowe (Canadian politician) =

Canadian politician

John Crowe (August 7, 1784 – August 30, 1878) was a farmer and political figure in Nova Scotia. He represented Onslow township from 1826 to 1830, from 1835 to 1836 and from 1841 to 1851 in the Nova Scotia House of Assembly.

He was born in Onslow, Nova Scotia to John Crowe and Elizabeth Marshall, immigrants from Ireland. Crowe went to sea at a young age before becoming a farmer. In 1818, he married Agnes McNutt. Crowe was elected to the assembly in an 1841 by-election held following the death of Alexander Upham. He died in Onslow at the age of 94.
