= James Turnbull (politician) =

Nova Scotian politician (d. 1846)

James Turnbull (died July 29, 1846) was a Scottish-born lawyer and political figure in Nova Scotia. He represented Juste-au-Corps County (subsequently renamed Inverness County) from 1836 to 1843 and Richmond County from 1843 to 1846 in the Nova Scotia House of Assembly as a Reformer.

Turnbull was educated and studied law in Scotland, later setting up practice in Arichat, Nova Scotia. In 1826, he was named the excise collector for the port and district of Arichat, serving until his death. He also served as registrar of probate for Richmond County from 1842 until his death at Port Hood four years later.
