= Samuel Prescott Fairbanks =

Canadian politician

Samuel Prescott Fairbanks, QC (January 31, 1795 – December 7, 1882) was a lawyer and political figure in Nova Scotia, Canada. He represented Queen's County from 1836 to 1847 in the Nova Scotia House of Assembly.

He was born in Halifax, the son of Rufus Fairbanks and Ann Prescott, and was educated at King's College in Windsor. Fairbanks was called to the Nova Scotia bar in 1818 and set up practice in Liverpool. In 1820, he married Charlotte Ann Newton. He served as registrar for the probate court from 1842 to 1847. Fairbanks was named Queen's Counsel in 1845. He served as provincial treasurer from 1845 to 1848. He was commissioner of crown lands from 1857 to 1872. Fairbanks died at home in Dartmouth at the age of 87.

His brother Charles Rufus Fairbanks, was also a lawyer and served in the provincial assembly.
