= Alexander Upham =

Nova Scotian politician (1802–1841)

Alexander McCurdy Upham (July 14, 1802 – April 19, 1841) was a farmer, merchant, ship builder and political figure in Nova Scotia. He represented Onslow township in the Nova Scotia House of Assembly from 1836 to 1841 as a Reformer.

He was born in Onslow, Nova Scotia, the son of Luke Upham and Jeanett Guthry McCurdy. In 1826, Upham married Mary Cutten. He died in office at North River at the age of 38.
