= Snow P. Freeman =

Canadian politician

Snow Parker Freeman (1805–1862) was a lawyer and political figure from Liverpool, Nova Scotia. He represented Queen's County in the Nova Scotia House of Assembly from 1843 to 1855. He married Annie Head Mitchell in Halifax on March 24, 1846. She was the daughter of George Mitchell, Esq., of Halifax, a former merchant.

He was the son of Joseph Freeman. Freeman served as a judge in the probate court and also as consular agent for the United States. He died in Liverpool.
