= Anselm-François Comeau =

Canadian politician

Anselm-François Comeau (December 2, 1793 – November 27, 1867) was a farmer, businessman and politician of Acadian descent in Nova Scotia. He represented Clare Township in the Nova Scotia House of Assembly from 1840 to 1855, generally supporting the Reform Party.

He was born in Comeauville, Nova Scotia, the son of François Comeau and Marguerite Melanson. In 1824, he married Marie-Gertrude Amirault. Comeau was also involved in lumbering, owning a sawmill, and fishing. He served as postmaster for Clare. Comeau was named a magistrate for Clare in 1848. In 1855, he was named to the province's Legislative Council, serving until his death in 1867.
