= William White Bent =

Canadian politician

William White Bent (1800 – April 22, 1866) was a political figure in Nova Scotia. He represented Amherst township from 1847 to 1859 in the Nova Scotia House of Assembly as a Conservative member.

He was born in Amherst, Nova Scotia on January 7, 1800, the son of John Bent and Mary Lunt. He died in Amherst.
