= Thomas Forrester (politician) =

Canadian politician

Thomas Forrester (1790 – November 15, 1841) was a merchant and political figure in Nova Scotia. He represented Halifax township in the Nova Scotia House of Assembly from 1836 to 1841 as a Reformer.

== Biography ==
He was born in Halifax, the son of Alexander Forrester. He was educated at the Halifax Grammar School and, after completing his schooling, joined the British Army. Forrester served during the War of 1812. After the war, he became a dry goods merchant in Halifax. In 1813, he married Elizabeth Martin. Originally a supporter of Joseph Howe, Forrester later withdrew his support because he felt that Howe had made too many compromises to become part of the coalition government. During the financial crisis of 1837, Forrester sued the Bank of Nova Scotia for refusing to redeem paper money for coin. He also lobbied for Halifax's incorporation as a town.

== Death ==
Thomas Forrester died on November 15, 1841. He died in office in Halifax after suffering from poor health for several months.
