= Henry Blackadar =

Canadian politician

Represented Pictou County
- In office 1840–1843

Represented Pictou township
- In office 1845–1851

Personal details
- Born: 1803
- Died: November 22, 1852 (aged 48–49)
- Occupation: lawyer and political figure

Henry Nicol Blackadar (1803 – November 22, 1852) was a lawyer and political figure in Nova Scotia, Canada. He represented Pictou County from 1840 to 1843 and Pictou township from 1845 to 1851 in the Nova Scotia House of Assembly.

He was baptized in Halifax in December 1803, the son of Charles Blackadar. He began practising as a lawyer around 1825. Blackadar died in Pictou at the age of 48.
