= Henry Martell =

Canadian politician

Henry Martell (August 3, 1806 – December 21, 1877) was a merchant and political figure in Nova Scotia, Canada. He represented Arichat Township from 1843 to 1859 and Richmond County from 1859 to 1863 in the Nova Scotia House of Assembly as a Reformer and later Conservative.

He was born in Arichat, Nova Scotia, of French descent, and was educated there. In 1833, he married Marie Julie Peltier. Martell was a school commissioner and a commissioner for St. Peter's Canal. In 1868, he was named to the province's Legislative Council. He died in Arichat at the age of 71.
