= John Creighton (Nova Scotia politician) =

Canadian politician

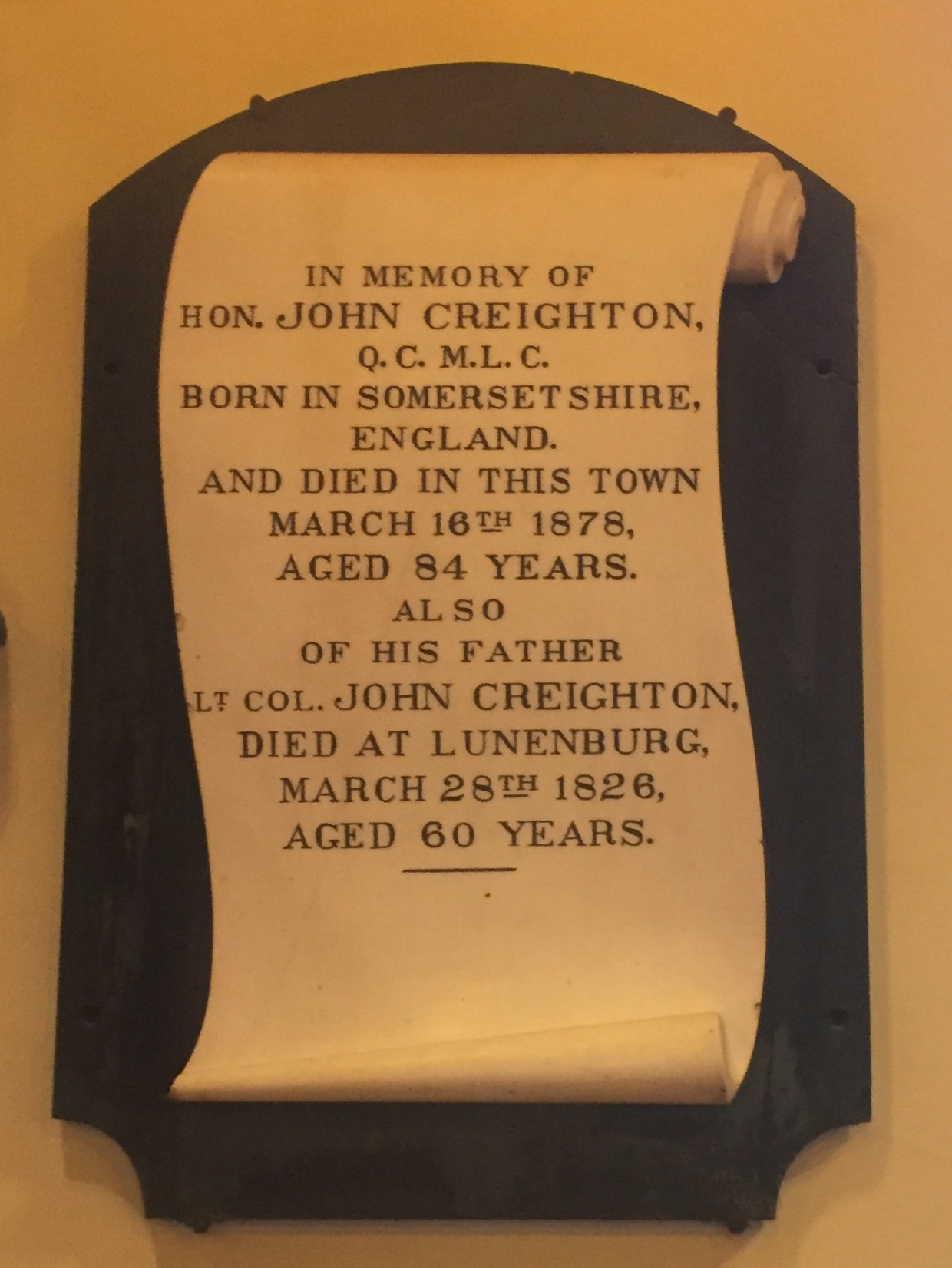
John Creighton and his father's Plaque, St. John's Anglican Church (Lunenburg), Nova Scotia

John Creighton (1794 – March 16, 1878) was an English-born lawyer and political figure in Nova Scotia. He represented Lunenburg in the Nova Scotia House of Assembly from 1830 to 1836, from 1838 to 1847 and from 1851 to 1856.

He was born in Somersetshire, the son of John Creighton, Jr. and the grandson of John Creighton, one of the first settlers at Lunenburg. Creighton came to Halifax at a young age, where he studied law with Lewis Morris Wilkins and was admitted to practice as an attorney in 1816. In 1821, he was named a Queen's Counsel and served as Crown Prosecutor. In 1859, he was named to the province's Legislative Council. Creighton was named president for the Council in 1875 and served until his death in Lunenburg three years later.
