= Henry Hatton =

Canadian politician

Henry Hatton (c. 1793 – 31 July 1853) was an Irish-born merchant, ship builder and political figure in Nova Scotia. He represented Pictou township from 1836 to 1843 in the Nova Scotia House of Assembly as a Conservative.

He was born in Gorey, Wexford, the son of Robert Hatton, a Dublin barrister, and Jane Tomkins. He came to Nova Scotia in 1813 with his family, settling in Pictou. He married Mary Ann Brown (b.c.1800 Newcastle upon Tyne - d.3 April 1876 Pictou).

Hatton became one of the most active shipbuilders in Pictou County. He owned a series of buildings and a wharf, known as Hatton's Wharf, at the foot of South Market Street. Henry was a central figure in the construction of St. James' Anglican Church in Pictou. He died in Pictou, and is buried with Mary and his parents in the St. James Churchyard.
