= Alexander Lackie Archibald =

Nova Scotia politician (1788–1859)

Alexander Lackie Archibald (March 5, 1788 – February 12, 1859) was a Nova Scotia politician, farmer, tanner, and boot manufacturer. He represented Truro township in the Nova Scotia House of Assembly from 1830 to 1843 and from 1848 to 1851 as a Conservative.

He was born in Truro, Nova Scotia, the son of Matthew Archibald and Janet Fisher. Archibald was married twice: first to Mary Fulton in 1810 and then to Christiana Nicholson in 1831. Archibald was defeated by William Fleming when he ran for reelection in 1847; Fleming's election was overturned in the following year and Archibald was declared elected. As a respected representative of the Truro township, he commissioned a statue of his father to be built in the town square. He died in Truro at the age of 70.
