= John Holmes (Nova Scotia politician) =

Canadian politician (1789–1876)

The Hon. John Holmes

Senator for Nova Scotia, Nova Scotia
- In office 1867–1876
- Appointed by: Royal Proclamation

Personal details
- Born: 1 March 1789 Ross-shire, Scotland
- Died: 3 June 1876 (aged 87) Springville, Nova Scotia, Canada
- Party: Conservative
- Children: Simon Hugh Holmes

John Holmes (1 March 1789 – 3 June 1876) was a Canadian politician.

He was born in Ross-shire, Scotland in 1789 and came to Pictou County, Nova Scotia with his family in 1803. Prior to Canadian Confederation in 1867, he represented Pictou County in the Nova Scotia House of Assembly from 1836 to 1847 and from 1851 to 1855. Holmes then served in the Legislative Council of Nova Scotia from 1858 to 1867. Following Confederation, he was appointed by royal proclamation to the newly formed Senate of Canada on 23 October 1867. A Conservative, he represented the Senate district of Nova Scotia until his death. He was the father of Nova Scotia premier Simon Hugh Holmes.
