= Reuben Clements =

Canadian politician

Reuben Clements (August 14, 1783 – March 28, 1868) was a sailor, pilot and political figure in Nova Scotia. He represented Yarmouth township in the Nova Scotia House of Assembly from 1835 to 1847 as a Reformer.

He was born in Chebogue, Nova Scotia, the son of Captain Elkanah Clements and Lucy Holmes. Clements married Elizabeth Pinkney. He served as a justice of the peace for Yarmouth County and also as county treasurer. He was first elected to the assembly in 1830 but subsequently disqualified after an appeal by Samuel Sheldon Poole; Clements was reelected in a by-election held in 1835 following Poole's death. He did not run for reelection in 1847. Clements died at the age of 84, probably in Yarmouth.
