= Charles Budd =

Canadian politician

Charles Budd (April 1, 1795 – April 24, 1884) was a merchant and political figure in Nova Scotia. He represented Digby township in the Nova Scotia House of Assembly from 1830 to 1836 and 1840 to 1851.

He was born in Digby, Nova Scotia, the son of Elisha Budd, who served in a loyalist regiment during the American Revolution. He married Mary, the daughter of Peleg Wiswall. Budd was defeated when he ran for reelection in 1836. He was elected in the general election that followed in 1840 and continued to serve as a member of the assembly until his defeat at the hands of John C. Wade in 1851. After retiring from politics, Budd served as registrar of probate for Digby County.

His sister Elizabeth, wife of Nathan Smith De Mille, was the mother of author James De Mille.
