= John Heckman =

Canadian politician

John Heckman (1785 – March 11, 1871) was a political figure in Nova Scotia. He represented Lunenburg County from 1818 to 1826 and Lunenburg township from 1826 to 1847 in the Nova Scotia House of Assembly.

He was born in Lunenburg, Nova Scotia, the son of Caspar Heckman and Mary Elizabeth Zwicker. In 1809, he married Elizabeth Ernst. Heckman was named a justice of the peace in 1831. He served as custos rotulorum for Lunenburg County from 1841 to 1867 and was registrar of deeds for the county from 1859 to 1871. He died in Lunenburg at the age of 86.
