= Robert McGowan Dickie =

Canadian judge and politician

Robert McGowan Dickie (c. 1784 – January 14, 1854) was a judge and political figure in Nova Scotia. He represented Amherst township from 1836 to 1843 and Cumberland County from 1843 to 1851 in the Nova Scotia House of Assembly. His surname also appears as Dickey in some sources.

He was the son of William Dickie. Dickie married Eleanor Chapman around 1812. He was lieutenant colonel in the county militia and a justice of the peace and served as justice in the Inferior Court of Common Pleas. He died at Goose River, Cumberland County, Nova Scotia, at the age of 69.

His son Robert Barry Dickie served in the Canadian Senate and is considered to be one of the Fathers of Confederation.
