= Mayhew Beckwith =

Canadian politician (1798–1871)

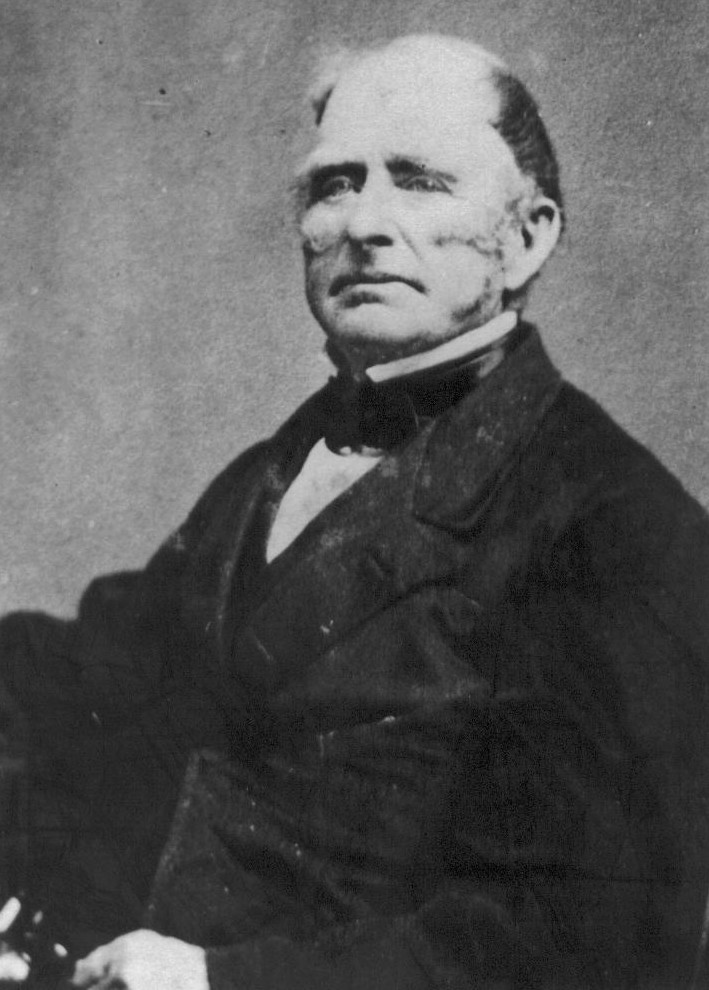
Family photo, date unknown

Mayhew Beckwith (October 14, 1798 – April 7, 1871) was a merchant and political figure in Nova Scotia. He represented Cornwallis in the Nova Scotia House of Assembly from 1841 to 1851.

He was born in Cornwallis Township, the son of Handley Beckwith and Catherine Newcomb. He married Eunice Rand in 1829. Beckwith served on the board of governors for Acadia College
