= Laurence O'Connor Doyle =

Canadian politician

Laurence O'Connor Doyle (February 27, 1804 – October 28, 1864) was a lawyer, editor and political figure in Nova Scotia. He represented Arichat Township from 1832 to 1840, Halifax County from 1843 to 1847 and Halifax Township from 1847 to 1855 in the Nova Scotia House of Assembly as a supporter of the Reform Party.

He was born in Halifax, Nova Scotia, the son of Laurence Doyle and Bridget O’Connor. He was educated at Stonyhurst College in England and then returned to study law with Richard John Uniacke. Doyle was called to the bar in 1828 and set up practice in Halifax. In 1833, he married Sarah Ann Driscoll. Doyle served as a member of the province's Executive Council from 1848 to 1850. In 1855, he moved to New York City, where he practiced law. Doyle died there at the age of 60.
