= Samuel Chipman =

Canadian politician

Samuel Chipman (October 18, 1790 – November 10, 1891) was a farmer, ship owner, merchant and political figure in Nova Scotia, Canada. He represented King's County from 1830 to 1843, Cornwallis Township from 1851 to 1859 and King's County from 1851 to 1863 in the Nova Scotia House of Assembly.

He was born in Cornwallis Township, Nova Scotia, the son of William Allen Chipman and Ann Osborn. In 1815, he married Elizabeth Gesner, sister of Abraham Gesner. He married Jessie W. Hardy in 1841 after the death of his first wife. Chipman served in the local militia and was also a freemason. He received a number of appointments to patronage posts in King's County and Annapolis County over the years. In 1863, he was named to the province's Legislative Council and served until 1870, when he was named registrar of deeds for King's County. He retired from that post at the age of 98. Chipman died in Kentville three years later.
