= Benjamin Smith (Nova Scotia politician) =

Nova Scotian politician (1786–1873)

Benjamin Smith (August 23, 1786 – March 25, 1873) was a farmer, land surveyor and political figure in Nova Scotia. He represented Hants County in the Nova Scotia House of Assembly from 1836 to 1847 and from 1851 to 1855 as a Conservative.

He was born in Kennetcook, Nova Scotia, the son of Colonel William Smith and Susannah Lake. Smith was married twice: first to Mary Oxley in 1812 and then to Eliza Cole in 1826. He served fifty years as a justice of the peace and was deputy government surveyor. Smith died in Newport at the age of 86.

His brother Richard also served in the assembly.
