= Edmund Murray Dodd =

Canadian politician (1797–1876)

Edmund Murray Dodd (January 9, 1797 – July 27, 1876) was a lawyer, judge and political figure in Nova Scotia. He represented the township of Sydney in the Nova Scotia House of Assembly from 1832 to 1848.

He was born in Sydney, Nova Scotia, the son of Archibald Charles Dodd and Susannah Gibbons. Dodd served in the British navy during the War of 1812. He later practiced law in Sydney. In 1826, he married Mary Ann Sarah Weeks. Dodd married Caroline Maria Ritchie in 1830, a granddaughter of David Mathews, the Loyalist Mayor of New York City under the British during the American Revolution, after the death of his first wife. Although he generally supported the Tories in the assembly, he was for a time a personal friend of Joseph Howe. Dodd was named to the Executive Council in 1838 and was named Solicitor General in 1844. He served as a probate judge from 1842 to 1848, when he was named puisne judge in the Supreme Court of Nova Scotia. He retired from the bench in 1873 and died at Cow Bay three years later at the age of 79.

His son Murray later served in the Canadian House of Commons.
