= Herbert Huntington =

Canadian politician

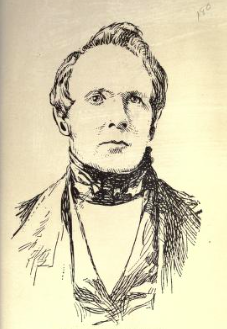
- Herbert Huntington

MLA for Yarmouth County
- In office 1836–1850

MLA for Shelburne County
- In office 1830–1836

Personal details
- Born: July 27, 1799 Yarmouth, Nova Scotia
- Died: September 13, 1851 (aged 52) Yarmouth, Nova Scotia
- Occupation: Politician

Herbert Huntington (July 27, 1799 – September 13, 1851) was a farmer, merchant and politician in Nova Scotia. He represented Shelburne County from 1830 to 1836 and Yarmouth County from 1836 to 1850 in the Nova Scotia House of Assembly.

== Early life ==
He was born in Yarmouth, Nova Scotia, the son of Miner Huntington, a Connecticut loyalist, and Martha Walker.

== Career ==
Huntington served with the militia during the War of 1812 and taught school for a time. He also served as a land surveyor like his father.

During the War of 1812, Huntington served with the Yarmouth militia to repel the landing of an American ship. He taught school in Yarmouth for a time, served as a militia captain, and in 1822 became the first librarian of the Yarmouth Book Society. He was a farmer and also owned and held shares in several ships.

== Political career ==
He served as a member of the province's Executive Council for a short time in 1838. In 1848, he was named a minister without portfolio and later financial secretary for the province.

== Resignation and death ==
Huntingdon resigned his seat in the assembly at the end of 1850 due to poor health. He died in Yarmouth nine months later at the age of 52.

== Personal life ==
In 1830, Huntington married Rebecca Russell (née Pinkney).
