= William Benajah Taylor =

Nova Scotian politician (1794–c.1853)

William Benajah Taylor (June 10, 1794 – c. 1853) was a Canadian merchant and political figure in Nova Scotia. He represented Liverpool township from 1836 to 1851 in the Nova Scotia House of Assembly as a Conservative.

== Background ==
Taylor was born in Liverpool, Nova Scotia, the son of James Taylor and Susanna Collins. In 1816, he married Trephana, the daughter of Joseph Barss. He served as a fire warden and was magistrate for Queens County from 1838 to 1853. Taylor died in Halifax.
