= William Frederick DesBarres =

Canadian politician

William Frederick DesBarres (1800 – June 1885) was a lawyer, judge and political figure in Nova Scotia, Canada. He represented Guysborough County in the Nova Scotia House of Assembly from 1836 to 1848 as a Reformer.

He was born in Elysian, Cumberland County, Nova Scotia, the son of John DesBarres. DesBarres studied law with Lewis Morris Wilkins and Hiram Blanchard, was admitted to the Nova Scotia bar in 1822 and set up practice in Guysborough. He married Maria Cutler, the daughter of Robert M. Cutler, in 1825. In 1830, he was named probate judge for Sydney County. DesBarres served in the province's Executive Council as Solicitor General. He was named to the Supreme Court of Nova Scotia in 1848 and served until 1881. DesBarres died in Halifax.
