= Stephen Fulton (politician) =

Canadian merchant and political figure

Stephen Fulton (1810 – October 23, 1870) was a merchant, ship builder and political figure in Nova Scotia. He represented Cumberland County in the Nova Scotia House of Assembly from 1840 to 1855. At age 20 Stephen was converted to Methodism and took an active role in his church for the rest of his life, serving as circuit steward, leader, and trustee.

He was born in Wallace, Cumberland County, Nova Scotia, the son of William Fulton. He was married twice; first to Julia Ann Heustis and later to Sarah Elizabeth Black. Fulton built a warehouse, wharf and sawmill. He originally supported the Tories but later became a supporter of the Reform Party. Fulton served as a justice of the peace and a school commissioner. He was defeated when he ran for reelection in 1855 and 1859. Fulton died at Wallace of typhus.
