= Stephen S. Thorne =

Canadian politician

Stephen Sneden Thorne (1795 – December 30, 1874) was a businessman and political figure in Nova Scotia. He represented Granville township in the Nova Scotia House of Assembly from 1836 to 1857.

He was born in Granville, Nova Scotia in 1795, the son of James Thorne and nephew of Edward Thorne. He apprenticed with his uncle, Stephen Sneden, a merchant in Annapolis. Around 1837, he married Mehitable Hall. Thorne went into business with his uncle Timothy Ruggles. After Ruggles' death in 1831, he moved to Bridgetown, where he went into business on his own. Thorne resigned his seat in the assembly to serve as Chairman of the Board of Works from 1857 to 1861. In 1863, he was named customs collector at Bridgetown and served in that post until his death.
