= François-Lambert Bourneuf =

Canadian politician

Member of the Nova Scotia House of Assembly
- In office 1843–1859
- Constituency: Digby County

Personal details
- Born: October 20, 1787 Regnéville, France
- Died: May 16, 1871 (aged 83) St. Mary's Bay, Nova Scotia, Canada
- Spouse: Marie Doucet (m. 1818)
- Occupation: Sailor, merchant, shipbuilder, educator

François-Lambert Bourneuf (October 20, 1787 – May 16, 1871) was a sailor, merchant and political figure in Nova Scotia, Canada. He represented Digby County in the Nova Scotia House of Assembly from 1843 to 1859. His first name sometimes appears as Francis.

== Early life ==
He was born in Regnéville, France, the son of François Bourneuf and Michelle Énolle, and served three years in the French navy before signing on with a ship trading in the West Indies.

== Life in Nova Scotia ==
Bourneuf was captured by the English in 1809 and brought to Halifax, Nova Scotia. He escaped and became a school teacher in Pombcoup (later Pubnico). In 1813, he moved to St. Mary's Bay, where he took an oath of allegiance to Britain. After teaching and then farming, he went to sea as second in command of a schooner. In 1817, he bought his own ship. Some time later, he also began building ships. In 1818, Bourneuf married Marie Doucet, the daughter of Amable Doucet, a magistrate and Acadian. Bourneuf was one of the first magistrates for Digby County and also served on the first school commission for Clare.

== Death ==
He died at St. Mary's Bay at the age of 83.
