= Ichabod Dimock =

Canadian politician

Ichabod Dimock (died June 16, 1858) was a farmer, magistrate and political figure in Nova Scotia. He represented Newport township from 1840 to 1855 and Hants County from 1855 to 1858 in the Nova Scotia House of Assembly as a Reformer.

Ichabod was the son of Shubael Dimock and Susan Macumber and the grandson of the Reverend Shubael Dimock. In 1803, Dimock married Sarah Smith. He died due to a tree fall in Newport.
