= Alfred Whitman =

Canadian politician

Alfred Whitman (1797 – January 27, 1861) was a farmer, merchant and political figure in Nova Scotia. He represented the township of Annapolis in the Nova Scotia House of Assembly from 1844 to 1857.

He was born in Rosette (later Round Hill, Nova Scotia), the son of John Whitman and Elizabeth Rice, and younger brother of Elnathan. For a time, he worked as a clerk and book-keeper for Phineas Lovett. He married June Spurr and operated a farm in Rosette until he was forced to find other employment due to health problems. Whitman became a merchant in Annapolis. He ran unsuccessfully for a seat in the provincial assembly in 1840. In 1857, Whitman was named to the province's Legislative Council and served until his death in Annapolis Royal at the age of 63.
