= John Joseph Marshall =

Canadian politician (1807–1870)

MLA for Guysborough County
- In office 1840–1847
- In office 1850–1859
- In office 1867–1870

Speaker of the Nova Scotia House of Assembly
- In office 1867–1870
- Preceded by: John Chipman Wade
- Succeeded by: Jared C. Troop

Personal details
- Born: October 1807 Guysborough, Nova Scotia
- Died: October 25, 1870 (aged 62–63) Glenkeen, Nova Scotia
- Party: Liberal
- Occupation: merchant

John Joseph Marshall (October 1807 – October 25, 1870) was a merchant and politician in Nova Scotia, Canada. He represented Guysborough County in the Nova Scotia House of Assembly from 1840 to 1847, from 1850 to 1859 and from 1867 to 1870.

He was born in Guysborough, Nova Scotia, the son of Joseph H. Marshall, and was educated in Sackville. He ran a general store and also served as justice of the peace. Marshall married Esther Maria Ballaine in 1835. He was the province's financial secretary from 1857 to 1860. Marshall was opposed to Confederation. He served as speaker for the provincial assembly from 1868 to 1870. He died while in office at his home in Glenkeen, Manchester Township, Nova Scotia.

His uncle John George Marshall also served in the province's assembly.
