= John Ryder (Canadian politician) =

Canadian politician (1805–1872)

John Ryder (1805 – April 19, 1872) was a merchant, shipbuilder and political figure in Nova Scotia. He represented Argyle township from 1840 to 1859 as a Reformer.

He was born in Argyle, Nova Scotia, the son of captain Solomon Ryder. Ryder was involved in the West Indies trade. He held shares in the Yarmouth Marine Insurance Association. Ryder was a justice of the peace for Yarmouth and Argyle from 1834 to 1872. He died in Argyle at the age of 66.
