= Gloud Wilson McLelan =

Canadian politician (1796–1858)

Gloud Wilson McLelan (April 18, 1796 – April 6, 1858) was a Canadian businessman and politician. He represented Londonderry Township from 1836 to 1847 and Colchester County from 1851 to 1858 in the Nova Scotia House of Assembly.

== Biography ==
He was born on April 18, 1796, in Great Village, Nova Scotia, the son of David McLelan and Mary Durling, and, after very little formal education, he entered business as a merchant and shipper. McLelan married Martha Spencer in 1822. He died in office, on April 6, 1858, aged 61, in Halifax.

His son Archibald succeeded him in the assembly and went on to serve in the Canadian House of Commons and Senate.
