= James Boyle Uniacke =

Canadian politician (1799–1858)

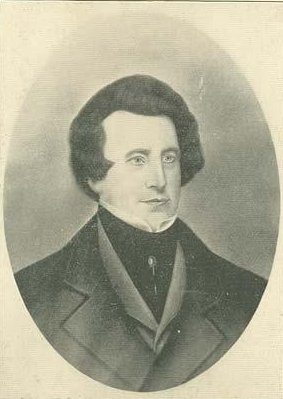

Premier of the Colony of Nova Scotia
- In office 1848–1854
- Succeeded by: William Young

Personal details
- Born: 1799 Halifax, Nova Scotia
- Died: 26 March 1858 (aged 58–59) Halifax, Nova Scotia

James Boyle Uniacke (1799 – 26 March 1858) led the first responsible government in Canada as it is today or any colony of the British Empire. He was the first Premier of the Colony of Nova Scotia from 1848 to 1854 serving concurrently as the colony's Attorney-General.

The son of Richard John Uniacke, James was born to politics and entered the colony's legislative assembly in 1832 as a Conservative. In 1838 he joined the Executive Council and became a Reformer during the struggle for responsible government culminating in the 1848 election, the first under responsible government, which resulted in a Liberal Party administration led by Uniacke with Howe becoming more prominent after 1851 as Uniacke's health declined.

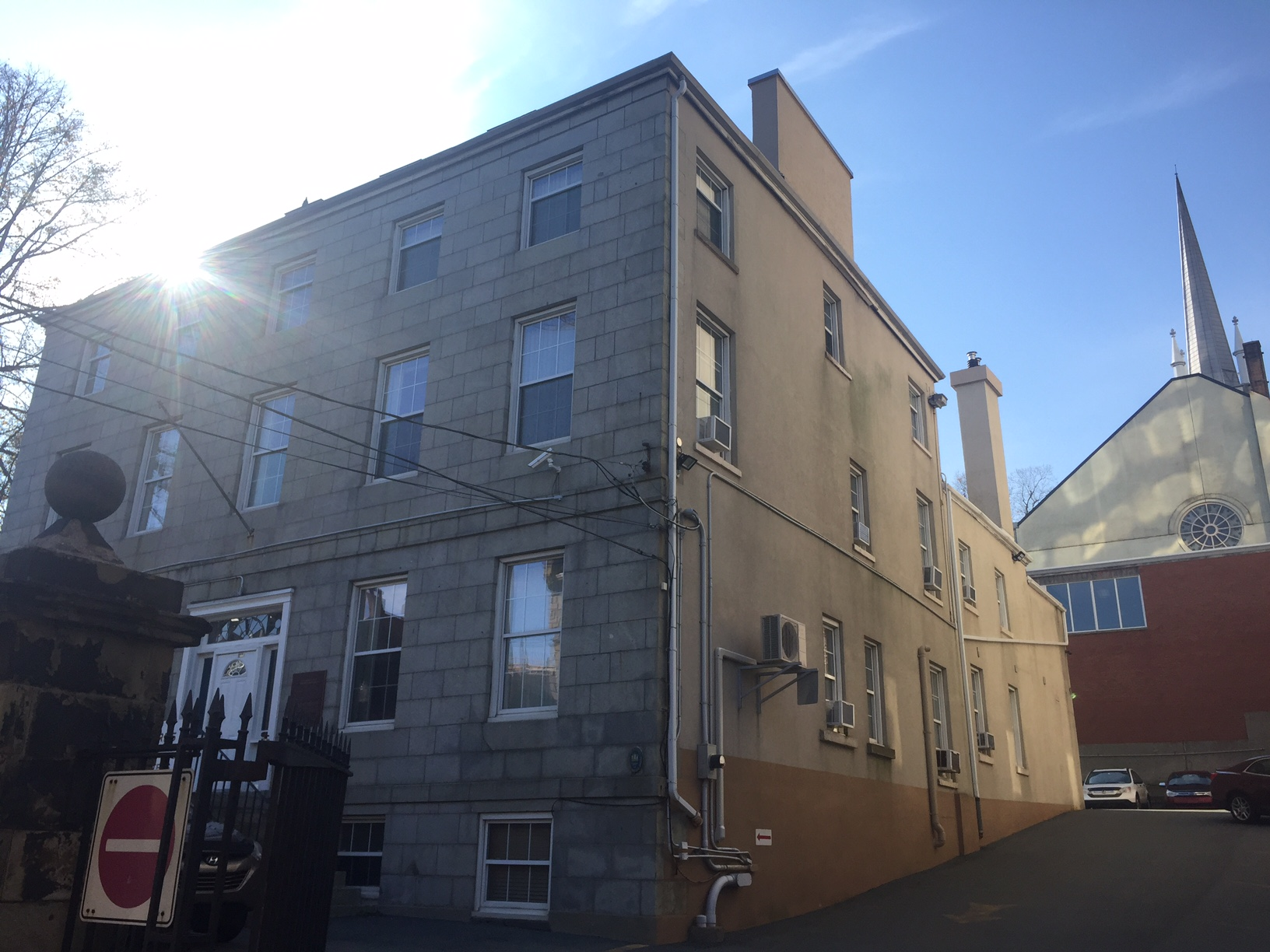
Uniacke's residence: Black-Binney House, Halifax, Nova Scotia

Uniacke worked closely with Joseph Howe, the most influential reform politician of the era and put Howe in his cabinet as Provincial Secretary. The two politicians worked to adapt Nova Scotia's institutions to the new democratic forms. Uniacke retired as Premier in 1854 to become commissioner of crown lands and surveyor general.

In 1832, Uniacke married Rosina Jane, the daughter of John Black. Uniacke lived for years with Rosina in what is now known as the Black-Binney House, which is now a national historic site.

Political offices
New office Assumed most of the powers of the Lieutenant-Governor of Nova Scotia.	Premier of Nova Scotia; 1848-1854	Succeeded by William Young
