= William Young (Nova Scotia politician) =

Canadian politician (1799–1887)

Sir William Young KCB
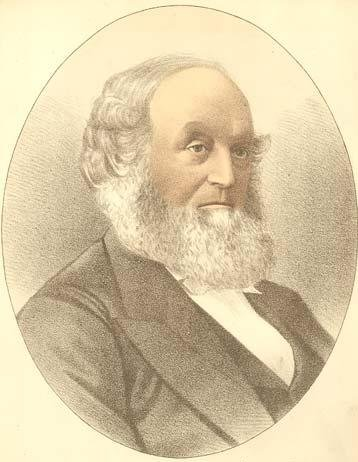

Premier of the Colony of Nova Scotia
- In office 1854–1860
- Preceded by: James Boyle Uniacke
- Succeeded by: James William Johnston

MLA for Inverness County
- In office 1836–1860

Speaker of the Nova Scotia House of Assembly
- In office 1843–1855
- Preceded by: Joseph Howe
- Succeeded by: Stewart Campbell

Personal details
- Born: 8 September 1799 Falkirk, Scotland
- Died: 8 May 1887 (aged 87) Halifax, Nova Scotia, Canada
- Party: Reformer
- Occupation: Lawyer

Sir William Young, KCB (8 September 1799 – 8 May 1887) was a Nova Scotia politician and jurist. He served as the Speaker of the Nova Scotia House of Assembly from 1843 to 1855 and as the Premier of the Colony of Nova Scotia from 1854 to 1860.

Born in Falkirk, the son of John Young and Agnes Renny, Young was first elected to the Nova Scotia House of Assembly in 1836 as a Reformer (or Liberal) and, as a lawyer, defended Reform journalists accused of libel. When responsible government was instituted in 1848, Young hoped to become the first Premier but was passed over in favour of fellow reformer James Boyle Uniacke and Young became Speaker. However, Young succeeded Uniacke in 1854.

His government was accused of overlooking Catholics and tensions with Catholics were exacerbated by Joseph Howe's rupture with Nova Scotia's Irish Catholic community over his recruitment of Americans to fight on the British side in the Crimean War.

In February 1857, ten Catholic and two Protestant Liberals voted with the Tories to bring down Young's government.

Young returned to power in January 1860 when the Tory government was unable to command a majority in the legislature after an election. In July, the colony's Chief Justice died and Young, who had long coveted the job, was appointed to the position by the lieutenant governor. He was noted for placing cushions on his chair so he would tower above his fellow justices. Young served as Chief Justice for twenty-one years and resigned in 1881.

== Death ==
Sir William Young died in Halifax on May 8, 1887.

== Legacy ==
- Young Avenue, Halifax, Nova Scotia is named after Sir William Young
- In 1887 (the same year that the Bandstand was built), the estate of chief justice Sir William Young, donated three statues and six urns from his own garden, to Halifax Public Gardens.
- Nova Scotian artist William Valentine painted Young's portrait.
- The Private and Local Acts of Nova-Scotia By Nova Scotia, Sir William Young

Political offices
Preceded by James Boyle Uniacke	Premier of Nova Scotia; 1854–1857	Succeeded by James William Johnston
Preceded by James William Johnston	Premier of Nova Scotia; 1860-1860	Succeeded by Joseph Howe
