= Granville Centre, Nova Scotia =

Community in Nova Scotia, Canada

Coordinates: 44°47′2.22″N 65°26′59.33″W

Granville Centre in Nova Scotia

Granville Centre is a rural Canadian community located in Annapolis County on the north shore of the Annapolis River in western Nova Scotia. The community is named after John Carteret, 2nd Earl Granville.
