= Arichat, Nova Scotia =

Community in Nova Scotia, Canada

Arichat
- Location within Nova Scotia
- Coordinates: 45°30′40.17″N 61°0′46.5″W
- Country: Canada
- Province: Nova Scotia
- Census division: Richmond County
- Established: 1785
- Time zone: UTC-4 (EST)
  - Summer (DST): UTC-4 (AST)
- Postal code span: B0E
- Area code: 902

Arichat is an unincorporated community in the Municipality of the County of Richmond, Nova Scotia, Canada. It is the primary settlement on Isle Madame, off the southeastern tip of Cape Breton Island.

== Toponym ==
The name derives from a Mi'kmaq word meaning camping ground, or worn rocks. The area was at one time known as "Acadiaville".

== History ==
Arichat has a deep and protected natural harbour which made it an important fishing and shipbuilding centre in the 1800s.

Jerseyman Island, which protects the harbour, was visited by Europeans fishermen as early as the 1500s.

The village was sacked by John Paul Jones during the American Revolutionary War, after which two cannons were installed above the village.

The LeNoir Forge was an important boat building site and is now a museum.

The first classes of St. Francis Xavier University began at Arichat in 1853, later moving to Antigonish.

The Catholic Cathedral of Notre Dame de l'Assomption was constructed in 1835, having since been rebuilt. It is the oldest surviving Roman Catholic Church in Nova Scotia.

St. John's Anglican Church was built in 1828, destroyed by fire and rebuilt in 1895. Considered to be the second oldest Anglican congregation in Cape Breton, the Church is noted for its amazing acoustic properties, a signature of its architect.

Lighthouses were built in the 1850s, since replaced with replicas in 2017-2018.

In 1970, SS Arrow struck Cerberus Rock, releasing over 10,000 tons of oil, devastating the fishing industry. It is now a popular dive site.

== Gallery ==
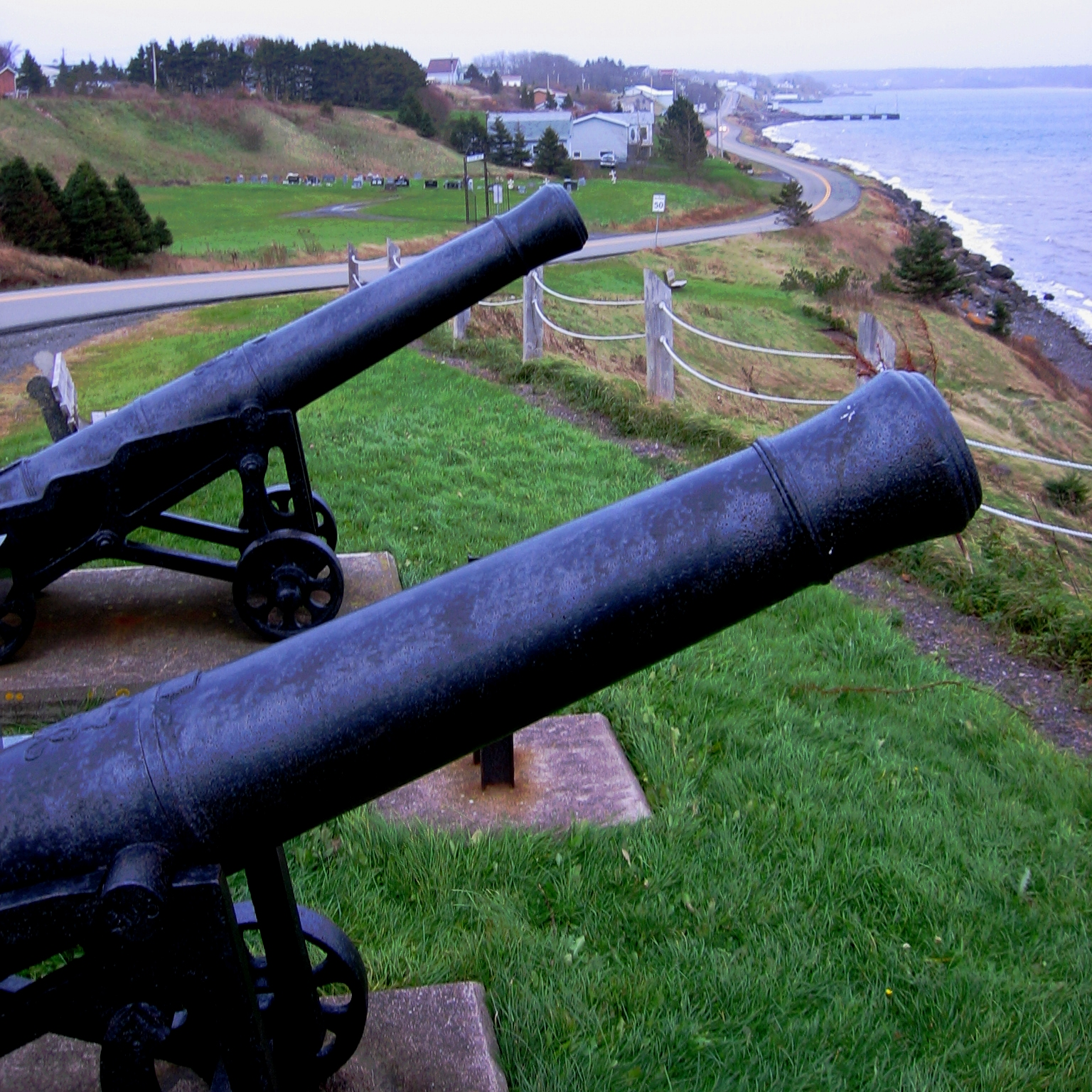
Arichat seen from Cannon Look-Off.

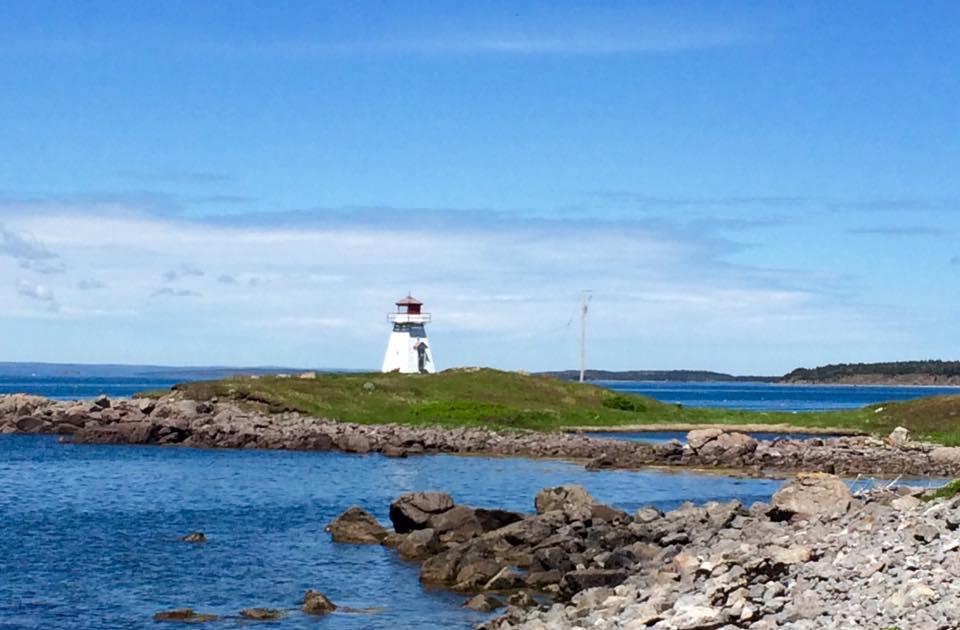
Lighthouse of Marche Point, standing at the edge of Cap Auguet

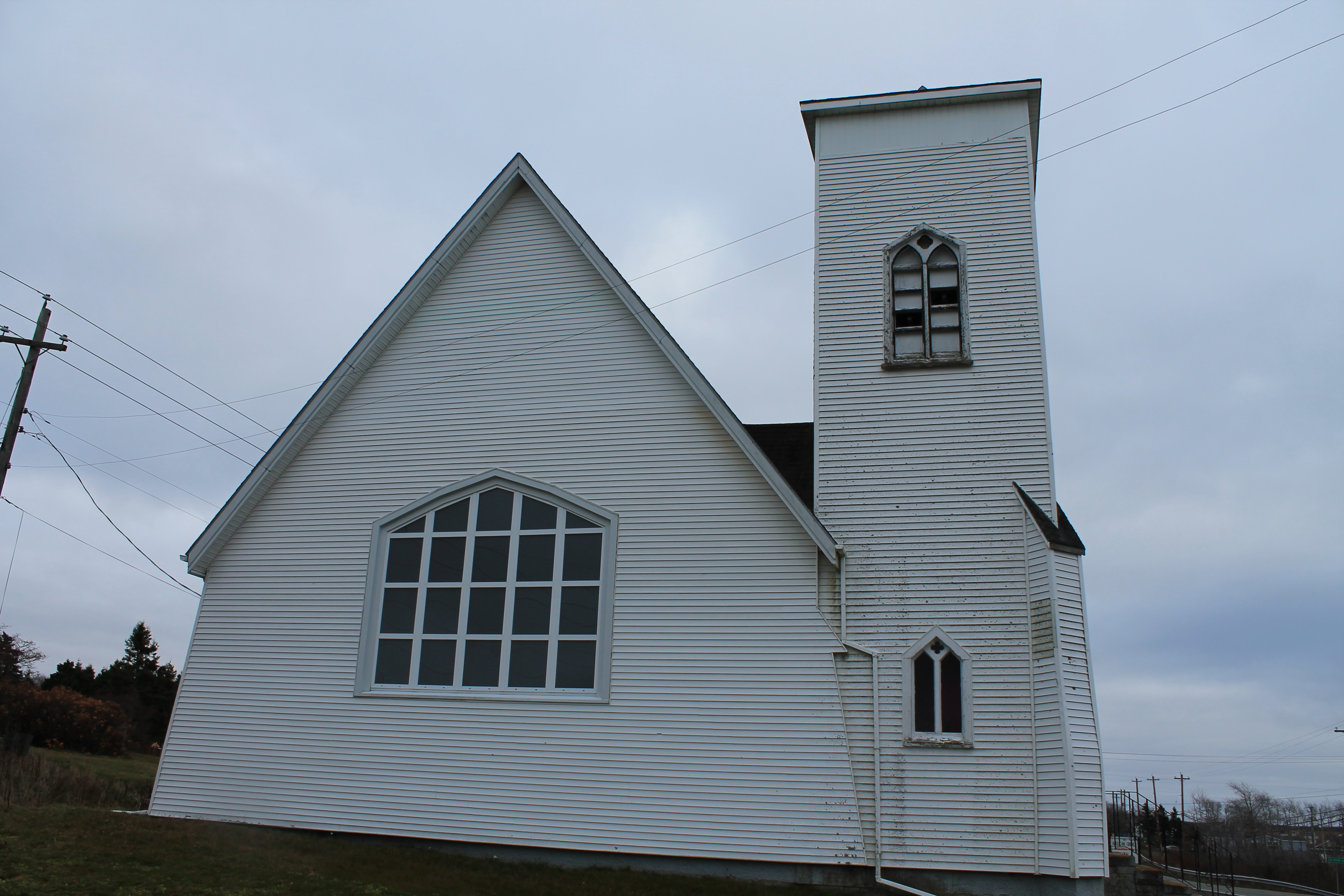
St John's Anglican Church, the second building, completed in 1895 and designed by William Harris.

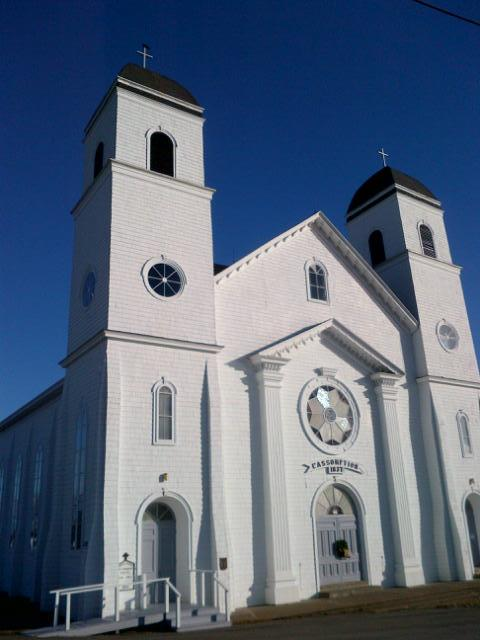
Notre Dame de L'Assumption
