= 12th General Assembly of Nova Scotia =

The 12th General Assembly of Nova Scotia represented Nova Scotia between 1820 and 1826.

The assembly sat at the pleasure of the Governor of Nova Scotia, James Kempt.

Simon Bradstreet Robie was chosen as speaker for the house. Samuel George William Archibald became speaker after Robie was named to the Council in 1824.

== List of members ==
Electoral District	Name	First elected / previously elected
Town of Amherst	James Shannon Morse	1818
County of Annapolis	Thomas Ritchie (Note: named judge)	1806
County of Annapolis	Abraham Gesner (1824)	1824
County of Annapolis	Samuel Campbell	1820
Town of Annapolis	John Robertson	1820
Town of Barrington	William Browne Sargent	1818
County of Cape Breton	Richard John Uniacke, Jr.	1818
County of Cape Breton	Laurence Kavanagh	1818
Town of Cornwallis	John Wells	1820
County of Cumberland	Thomas Roach	1799
County of Cumberland	George Oxley (Note: died in 1820)	1820
County of Cumberland	Robert Blair (1821) (Note: left for England in 1825; his resignation was not accepted by the assembly, so the seat remained empty)	1821
Town of Digby	William Henry Roach	1818
Town of Falmouth	William Young	1818
Town of Granville	Timothy Ruggles	1818
County of Halifax	William Lawson	1806
County of Halifax	George Smith	1819
County of Halifax	Samuel George William Archibald	1806
County of Halifax	Simon Bradstreet Robie	1799
County of Halifax	Lawrence Hartshorne, Jr. (1825)	1825
Town of Halifax	John Albro	1818
Town of Halifax	George Grassie	1820
Town of Halifax	Charles Rufus Fairbanks (1823)	1823
County of Hants	William Hersey Otis Haliburton	1811
County of Hants	Benjamin DeWolf (1824)	1824
County of Hants	William O'Brien	1820
Town of Horton	Jonathan Crane (Note: died before first session. Sherman Denison was elected in his place.)	1818
Town of Horton	Sherman Denison (1821)	1821
County of King's	William Allen Chipman	1799
County of King's	Samuel Bishop	1820
Town of Liverpool	James R. Dewolf	1820
Town of Londonderry	James Fleming	1811
County of Lunenburg	John Heckman	1818
County of Lunenburg	Lot Church	1820
Town of Lunenburg	Edward James	1793, 1806, 1817
Town of Newport	Daniel Wier	1820
Town of Onslow	Robert Dickson	1818
County of Queen's	Snow Parker	1801
County of Queen's	Joseph Freeman	1811
County of Shelburne	John Bingay	1818
County of Shelburne	John McKinnon	1820
Town of Shelburne	Jared Ingersol Chipman	1818
Town of Shelburne	Thomas Caldwell (1824)	1824
County of Sydney	John George Marshall	1811, 1820
County of Sydney	John Young (1824)	1824
County of Sydney	Thomas Dickson	1818
Town of Truro	William Dickson	1818
Town of Windsor	William Fraser	1818
Town of Yarmouth	Samuel Sheldon Poole	1785, 1804, 1813

== Notes ==
Preceded by 11th General Assembly of Nova Scotia	General Assemblies of Nova Scotia; 1820–1826	Succeeded by 13th General Assembly of Nova Scotia
