= 10th General Assembly of Nova Scotia =

A writ for the election of the 10th General Assembly of Nova Scotia was issued Aug. 17, 1811. It convened on February 6, 1812 and held eight sessions. It was dissolved on May 11, 1818.

The assembly sat at the pleasure of Lieutenant Governor John Coape Sherbrooke. George Ramsay became Lieutenant Governor in 1816.

Lewis Morris Wilkins was chosen as speaker for the house, seat declared vacant Feb. 13, 1817. Simon Bradstreet Robie was chosen as speaker Feb. 13, 1817.

== List of members ==
Electoral District	Name	First elected / previously elected	Notes
Amherst Township	Edward Baker	1806	
Annapolis County	Thomas Ritchie	1806	took seat Feb. 7, 1812.
Annapolis County	Peleg Wiswall	1811	seat declared vacant Mar. 5, 1817, appointed associate judge of Supreme Court.
Annapolis County	Cereno Upham Jones (1817)	1817	by-election June 4, 1817, took seat Feb. 10, 1818.
Annapolis Township	John Harris	1811	
Barrington Township	John Sargent	1793	
Cornwallis Township	William Allen Chipman	1799	
Cumberland County	Thomas Roach	1799	took seat Feb. 17, 1812.
Cumberland County	Henry Purdy	1806	
Digby Township	John Warwick	1806	
Falmouth Township	John Manning	1811	
Granville Township	Isaiah Shaw	1806	took seat Feb. 17, 1812.
Halifax County	Edward Mortimer	1799	took seat Feb. 14, 1812.
Halifax County	Samuel George William Archibald	1806	took seat Feb. 14, 1812.
Halifax County	Simon Bradstreet Robie	1799	
Halifax County	William Lawson	1806	
Halifax Township	John George Pyke	1793, 1801	
Halifax Township	John Pryor	1811	
Hants County	William Hersey Otis Haliburton	1811	
Hants County	Shubael Dimock	1799	
Horton Township	Samuel Bishop	1811	
Kings County	Jonathan Crane	1784	
Kings County	John Wells	1806	took seat Feb. 7, 1812.
Liverpool Township	Joseph Freeman	1811	
Londonderry Township	James Fleming	1811	
Lunenburg County	Lewis Morris Wilkins	1799	seat declared vacant Feb. 13, 1817, appointed puisne judge of Supreme Court.
Lunenburg County	Edward James (1817)	1793, 1806, 1817	by-election June 2, 1817, took seat Feb. 27, 1818.
Lunenburg County	Francis Joseph Rudolf	1811	took seat Feb. 10, 1812.
Lunenburg Township	John Creighton, Jr.	1810	took seat Feb. 10, 1812.
Newport Township	John Allison	1811	
Onslow Township	Nathaniel Marsters	1806	
Queens County	Snow Parker	1801	
Queens County	George Collins	1806	took seat Mar. 20, 1812, died May 6, 1813.
Queens County	John Barss (1813)	1813	by-election Aug. 25, 1813, took seat Feb. 17, 1814.
Shelburne County	Jacob Van Buskirk	1805	took seat Mar. 14, 1814.
Shelburne County	James Lent	1806	took seat July 21, 1812
Shelburne Township	Colin Campbell	1793	took seat Mar. 19, 1814.
Sydney County	John George Marshall	1811	2nd writ for Sydney Co. issued Oct. 28, election Dec. 2, 1811, took seat Feb. 6, 1812.
Sydney County	James Ballaine	1811	2nd writ for Sydney Co. issued Oct. 28, election Dec. 2, 1811, took seat Feb. 6, 1812, died April 10, 1812.
Sydney County	Samuel Hood George (1812)	1812	by-election Aug. 13, 1812, may not have taken seat, died June 10, 1813.
Sydney County	John Cunningham (1814)	1814	by-election May 20, 1814, took seat Feb. 8, 1815.
Truro Township	James Kent	1811	
Windsor Township	Loran DeWolf	1811	
Yarmouth Township	Samuel Marshall	1811	took seat February 13, 1812; died April 1, 1813.
Yarmouth Township	Samuel Sheldon Poole (1813)	1785, 1804, 1813	by-election September 3, 1813; took seat February 11, 1814.

Preceded by 9th General Assembly of Nova Scotia	General Assemblies of Nova Scotia; 1811–1818	Succeeded by 11th General Assembly of Nova Scotia
