= 9th General Assembly of Nova Scotia =

A writ for the election of the 9th General Assembly of Nova Scotia was issued 29 May 1806, returnable 7 Aug. 1806. It convened on 18 November 1806 and held seven sessions. It was dissolved on 14 August 1811.

The Assembly sat at the pleasure of Lieutenant Governor Sir John Wentworth until 1808, Lieutenant Governor Sir George Prevost to 1811, and Alexander Croke in 1811.

William Cottnam Tonge was chosen Speaker but the Lieutenant Governor did not approve. Lewis Morris Wilkins was then chosen Speaker 20 Nov. 1806.

== Division of Seats ==
Electoral District	Name	First elected / previously elected	Notes
Amherst Township	Edward Baker	1806	
Annapolis County	Thomas Ritchie	1806	
Annapolis County	Henry Rutherford	1806	took seat 10 Dec. 1806, died 21 Feb. 1807.
Annapolis County	Phineas Lovett, Jr. (1808)	1775, 1799, 1808	by-election 11 May 1808, took seat 30 May 1808.
Annapolis Township	Thomas Walker	1806	seat declared vacant 11 Dec. 1806 for undue influence. Lt. Gov. refused to issue the writ for by-election, case referred to home government. Response commanding writ be issued received 3 March 1808, when the house was in recess. Communicated to the House 25 May 1808.
Annapolis Township	William Robertson (1808)	1808	by-election, took seat 20 May 1808.
Barrington Township	John Sargent	1793	took seat 20 May 1808.
Cornwallis Township	Lemuel Morton	1799	took seat 18 Nov. 1806, died 30 April 1811.
Cumberland County	Henry Purdy	1806	
Cumberland County	Thomas Roach	1799	
Digby Township	John Warwick	1806	
Falmouth Township	Jeremiah Northup	1775	died in 1809
Falmouth Township	William Henry Shey (1809)	1809	by-election 31 May 1809, took seat 8 June 1809.
Granville Township	Isaiah Shaw	1806	
Halifax County	Edward Mortimer	1799	
Halifax County	Simon Bradstreet Robie	1799	took seat 3 Dec. 1807.
Halifax County	Samuel George William Archibald	1806	
Halifax County	William Lawson	1806	
Halifax Township	John George Pyke	1793, 1801	
Halifax Township	Foster Hutchinson, Jr.	1806	took seat 18 Nov. 1806, seat declared vacant 2 Apr. 1811, appointed assistant justice of the Supreme Court
Hants County	William Cottnam Tonge	1793	seat declared vacant 2 Apr. 1811 for non-attendance.
Hants County	Shubael Dimock	1799	
Horton Township	Daniel DeWolf	1806	
Kings County	Jonathan Crane	1784	
Kings County	John Wells	1806	
Liverpool Township	Joseph Barss	1799	took seat May 20, 1808.
Londonderry Township	Samuel Chandler	1799	
Lunenburg County	Lewis Morris Wilkins	1799	
Lunenburg County	Edward James	1793, 1806	
Lunenburg Township	John Bolman	1793	seat declared vacant 22 Dec. 1809 for non-attendance
Lunenburg Township	John Creighton, Jr. (1810)	1810	by-election, 30 Mar. 1810, may not have taken seat.
Newport Township	Thomas Allen	1806	
Onslow Township	Nathaniel Marsters	1806	
Queens County	Snow Parker	1801	
Queens County	George Collins	1806	
Shelburne County	Jacob Van Buskirk	1805	
Shelburne County	James Lent	1806	took seat 3 Dec. 1807.
Shelburne Township	Colin Campbell	1793	took seat 20 May 1808.
Sydney County	Joseph Marshall	1799	took seat 22 Nov. 1806.
Sydney County	Edward Irish	1806	died
Sydney County	William Allen Chipman	1799	by-election, took seat 18 Dec. 1807, seat declared vacant 4 Jan. 1808 due to invalid election.
Sydney County	John Cunningham (1808)	1808	by-election 9 May 1808, took seat 24 Nov. 1808.
Truro Township	Thomas Pearson	1806	
Windsor Township	William Hersey Otis Haliburton	1806	
Yarmouth Township	Samuel Sheldon Poole	1785, 1804	took seat 27 Nov. 1806.

Preceded by 8th General Assembly of Nova Scotia	General Assemblies of Nova Scotia; 1806–1811	Succeeded by 10th General Assembly of Nova Scotia
