= 11th General Assembly of Nova Scotia =

The 11th General Assembly of Nova Scotia represented Nova Scotia between 1818 and 1820.

The assembly sat at the pleasure of the Governor of Nova Scotia, George Ramsay.

Simon Bradstreet Robie was chosen as speaker for the house.

== List of members ==
Electoral District	Name	First elected / previously elected
Town of Amherst	James Shannon Morse	1818
County of Annapolis	Thomas Ritchie	1806
County of Annapolis	John Warwick	1806
Town of Annapolis	Thomas Ritchie	1806
Town of Barrington	William Browne Sargent	1818
County of Cape Breton	Richard John Uniacke, Jr.	1818
County of Cape Breton	Laurence Kavanagh	1818
Town of Cornwallis	Charles Ramage Prescott	1818
County of Cumberland	Thomas Roach	1799
County of Cumberland	Henry Purdy	1806
Town of Digby	William Henry Roach	1818
Town of Falmouth	William Young	1818
Town of Granville	Timothy Ruggles, Jr.	1818
County of Halifax	Edward Mortimer	1799
County of Halifax	William Lawson	1806
County of Halifax	Simon Bradstreet Robie	1799
County of Halifax	Samuel George William Archibald	1806
County of Halifax	George Smith (1819)	1819
Town of Halifax	Henry Hezekiah Cogswell	1818
Town of Halifax	John Albro	1818
County of Hants	Shubael Dimock	1799
County of Hants	William Hersey Otis Haliburton	1811
Town of Horton	Jonathan Crane	1818
County of King's	William Allen Chipman	1799
County of King's	Elisha DeWolf	1818
Town of Liverpool	Joseph Freeman	1811
Town of Londonderry	James Fleming	1811
County of Lunenburg	Francis Rudolf	1811
County of Lunenburg	John Heckman	1818
Town of Lunenburg	Edward James	1793, 1806, 1817
Town of Newport	John Allison	1811
Town of Onslow	Robert Dickson	1818
County of Queen's	Snow Parker	1801
County of Queen's	John Barss	1813
County of Shelburne	John Bingay	1818
County of Shelburne	Abraham Lent	1818
Town of Shelburne	Jared Ingersol Chipman	1818
County of Sydney	Robert Mollison Cutler	1818
County of Sydney	Thomas Dickson	1818
Town of Truro	William Dickson	1818
Town of Windsor	William Fraser	1818
Town of Yarmouth	Samuel Sheldon Poole	1785, 1804, 1813

Preceded by 10th General Assembly of Nova Scotia	General Assemblies of Nova Scotia; 1818–1820	Succeeded by 12th General Assembly of Nova Scotia
