= 8th General Assembly of Nova Scotia =

A writ for the election of the 8th General Assembly of Nova Scotia was issued on October 21, 1799, returnable by December 23, 1799. The assembly convened on February 20, 1800, held six sessions, and was dissolved on May 28, 1806.

== Sessions ==
Dates of specific sessions are under research.

== Governor and Council ==
- Governor-in-Chief of British North America: Sir Robert Milnes
  - Lieutenant Governor: Sir John Wentworth

Technically, Gov. Milnes was appointed not as governor general, but as Governor of the Canadas, New Brunswick, and Nova Scotia (four simultaneous appointments). Since a governor only has power when actually in their jurisdiction, the three additional appointments were effectively meaningless, with Lt. Gov. Wentworth serving as acting governor.

The members of the Council are currently under research.

== House of Assembly ==
=== Officers ===
- Speaker of the House:
  - Richard John Uniacke of Queens County -resigned November 30, 1805.
  - William Cottnam Tonge of Newport Township -elected November 30, 1805.
- Clerk of the House: James Boutineau Francklin
- Sergeant at Arms: Adolphus Veith -appointed March 10, 1790

=== Division of seats ===
The customary assignment of seats was continued: 4 seats assigned to Halifax County, 2 seats to the other counties and to Halifax Township, and 1 seat to the other townships, for a total of 39 seats.

=== Members ===
Electoral District	Name	First elected / previously elected	Notes
Amherst Township	Thomas Lusby	1793	died February 10, 1801.
Amherst Township	Thomas Law Dickson (1802)	1802	by-election, took seat February 26,1802.
Annapolis County	Thomas Millidge	1793	
Annapolis County	James Moody	1793	
Annapolis Township	Phineas Lovett, Jr	1775, 1799	
Barrington Township	John Sargent	1793	took seat March 22, 1800.
Cornwallis Township	Lemuel Morton	1799	
Cumberland County	Thomas Roach	1799	
Cumberland County	George Oxley	1799	
Digby Township	Henry Rutherford	1793	
Falmouth Township	Jeremiah Northup	1775	
Granville Township	Edward Thorne	1799	
Halifax County	William Cottnam Tonge	1793	declared not qualified February 28, 1800. (was also elected to Newport Township)
Halifax County	Michael Wallace (1800)	1800	by-election March 22, 1800, took seat March 26, 1800. Appointed to Council, April 23, 1803.
Halifax County	William Lyon (1803)	1803	by-election, took seat June 1, 1803.
Halifax County	Edward Mortimer	1799	
Halifax County	James Fulton	1799	
Halifax County	Charles Morris	1788, 1797	
Halifax Township	William Cochran	1785	
Halifax Township	John George Pyke	1793	declared invalid election March 14, 1800.
Halifax Township	Andrew Belcher (1800)	1800	by-election, April 9, 1800, took seat April 16, 1800. Appointed to Council June 11, 1801.
Halifax Township	John George Pyke (1801)	1793, 1801	by-election, took seat February 25, 1802.
Hants County	John McMonagle	1799	
Hants County	Shubael Dimock	1799	
Horton Township	Joseph Allison	1799	
Kings County	Jonathan Crane	1784	
Kings County	William Allen Chipman	1799	
Liverpool Township	Joseph Barss	1799	
Londonderry Township	Samuel Chandler	1799	
Lunenburg County	Casper Wollenhaupt	1799	
Lunenburg County	Lewis Morris Wilkins	1799	
Lunenburg Township	John Bolman	1793	took seat February 27, 1800.
Newport Township	William Cottnam Tonge	1793	
Onslow Township	Daniel McCurdy	1799	
Queens County	Richard John Uniacke	1798	seat vacated November 30, 1805 go to England on personal business.
Queens County	James Taylor	1799	died January 15, 1801.
Queens County	Snow Parker (1801)	1801	by-election March 24, 1801, took seat June 22, 1801.
Shelburne County	George Gracie	1798	took seat March 8, 1800, died November 25, 1805.
Shelburne County	James Cox	1799	took seat March 8, 1800, died in 1805
Shelburne County	Jacob Van Buskirk (1805)	1805	by-election, took seat November 30, 1805.
Shelburne Township	Colin Campbell	1793	took seat March 22, 1800.
Sydney County	Joseph Marshall	1799	took seat June 11, 1801.
Sydney County	William Campbell	1799	took seat June 18, 1801, seat declared vacant January 17, 1806, "Atty. Gen'l. of Cape Breton Island and has not attended for two sessions."
Truro Township	Simon Bradstreet Robie	1799	
Windsor Township	George Henry Monk	1799	took seat March 10, 1800.
Yarmouth Township	Nathan Utley	1799	took seat March 21, 1800. Died 1804, apparently did not attend 1802-1803.
Yarmouth Township	Samuel Sheldon Poole (1804)	1785, 1804	by-election, took seat June 28, 1804.

Note: Unless otherwise noted, members were elected at the general election, and took their seats at the convening of the assembly. By-elections are special elections held to fill specific vacancies. When a member is noted as having taking their seat on a certain date, but a by-election isn't noted, the member was elected at the general election but arrived late.

Preceded by 7th General Assembly of Nova Scotia	General Assemblies of Nova Scotia; 1799–1806	Succeeded by 9th General Assembly of Nova Scotia
