= Onslow =

Onslow may refer to:

== Places ==
- Onslow, Western Australia, Australia, a town
- Onslow, Nova Scotia, Canada, an unincorporated community
  - Onslow Speedway
- Borough of Onslow, New Zealand
- Onslow (New Zealand electorate), a New Zealand parliamentary electorate
- Lake Onslow, New Zealand, a man-made lake
- Onslow Village, an area of Guildford, Surrey, UK
- Onslow, Iowa, U.S.
- Onslow County, North Carolina, U.S.
- Onslow Bay, North Carolina, U.S.

== Ships ==
- HMS Onslow (1916), an Admiralty M-class destroyer
- HMS Onslow (G17), an O-class destroyer launched in March 1941
  - HMS Pakeham, a destroyer launched in January 1941 that exchanged named with the O-class destroyer before commissioning
- HMAS Onslow, a submarine of the Royal Australian Navy
- USS Onslow (AVP-48), a United States Navy seaplane tender

== Titles ==
- Earl of Onslow, an extant title in the Peerage of the United Kingdom
- Onslow baronets, two titles, both extant

== People ==
- Onslow (surname)
- Onslow (given name)

== Other uses ==
- Onslow (Keeping Up Appearances), a character on Keeping Up Appearances
- Onslow College, a secondary school in Wellington, New Zealand
- Onslow AFC, a defunct association football club from Wellington, New Zealand
