= Samuel Marshall =

Samuel Marshall may refer to:

- S. L. A. Marshall (1900–1977), American military historian
- Sam Marshall, fictional character in the Australian TV drama series Home and Away
- Sam Marshall (footballer) (born 2006), Australian rules footballer
- Samuel Marshall (1803–1879), founder Marshall & Sons music retailer of Adelaide, South Australia
- Samuel Marshall (Canadian politician) (1757–1813), merchant, shipbuilder and political figure in Nova Scotia
- Samuel R. Marshall, insurance lobbyist in Pennsylvania
- Samuel S. Marshall (1821–1890), American politician, U.S. representative from Illinois
- Samuel Taylor Marshall (1812–1895), co-founder of the Beta Theta Pi fraternity
