= Judge Ritchie =

Judge Ritchie may refer to:

- Andrew Ritchie (judge) (born 1960), British High Court judge
- John Ritchie (merchant) (c. 1745–1790), judge of the Inferior Court of Common Pleas of Canada
- Thomas Ritchie (judge) (1777–1852), judge of the Inferior Court of Common Pleas for the western division of Canada

== See also ==
- Judge Richey (disambiguation)
- Justice Ritchie (disambiguation)
