= Samuel Archibald =

Samuel Archibald may refer to:

- Samuel Archibald (politician, born 1742) (1742–1780), Irish-born farmer, merchant and political figure in Nova Scotia
- Samuel George William Archibald (1776–1846), his son, lawyer, judge and political figure in Nova Scotia
- Samuel Archibald (writer) (born 1978), Canadian writer
