= 9th Nova Scotia general election =

The 9th Nova Scotia general election may refer to:

- Nova Scotia general election, 1806, the 9th general election to take place in the Colony of Nova Scotia, for the 9th General Assembly of Nova Scotia
- 1897 Nova Scotia general election, the 31st overall general election for Nova Scotia, for the (due to a counting error in 1859) 32nd Legislative Assembly of Nova Scotia, but considered the 9th general election for the Canadian province of Nova Scotia
