= 12th Nova Scotia general election =

12th Nova Scotia general election may refer to:

- Nova Scotia general election, 1820, the 12th general election to take place in the Colony of Nova Scotia, for the 12th General Assembly of Nova Scotia
- 1911 Nova Scotia general election, the 34th overall general election for Nova Scotia, for the (due to a counting error in 1859) 35th Legislative Assembly of Nova Scotia, but considered the 12th general election for the Canadian province of Nova Scotia
