= David Archibald (politician) =

Canadian politician

David Archibald (September 20, 1717 – 1795) was an Irish-born farmer and politician in Nova Scotia. He represented Truro Township in the Legislative Assembly of Nova Scotia from 1766 to 1770.

== Personal life ==
He was born in Derry and came to Londonderry, New Hampshire in 1757. In 1762, Archibald settled in Truro Township. He had married Elizabeth Elliott in 1741.

== Political career ==
Archibald was a justice of the peace and a major in the local militia. He was elected to the assembly in a 1766 by-election held after Charles Morris Jr, who had been elected in both Truro and King's County, chose to represent the latter.

=== After Death ===
His son Samuel, his grandson Samuel George William Archibald and his great-grandson Charles Dickson Archibald also served in the assembly.

== Death ==
Archibald died at Bible Hill.
