= 10th Nova Scotia general election =

The 10th Nova Scotia general election may refer to:

- Nova Scotia general election, 1811, the 10th general election to take place in the Colony of Nova Scotia, for the 10th General Assembly of Nova Scotia
- Nova Scotia general election, 1901, the 32nd overall general election for Nova Scotia, for the (due to a counting error in 1859) 33rd Legislative Assembly of Nova Scotia, but considered the 10th general election for the Canadian province of Nova Scotia.
