= Henry Purdy =

Henry Purdy may refer to:

- Henry Purdy (politician) (died 1827), landowner, judge and political figure in Nova Scotia
- Henry Purdy (cricketer) (1883–1943), English cricketer
- Henry Purdy (rugby union) (born 1994), English rugby union footballer
