= Hannah Maynard Pickard =

American novelist

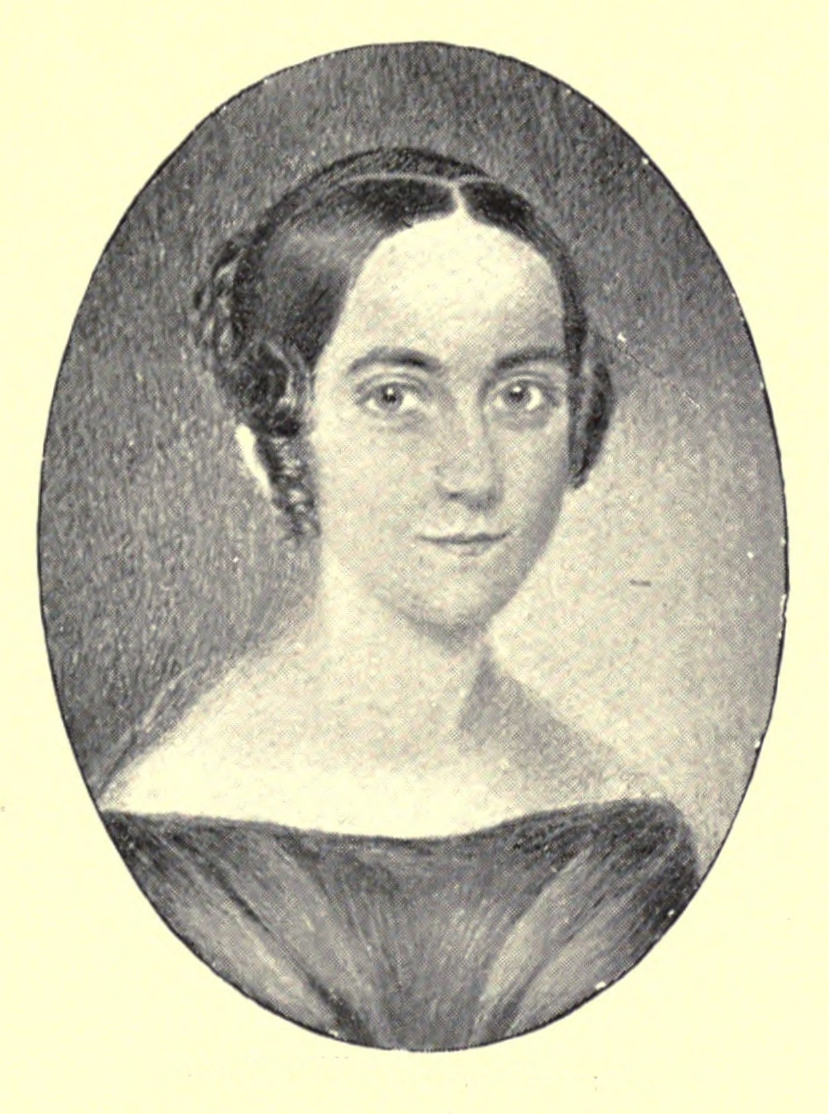
- Born: Hannah Maynard Thompson; November 25, 1812; Chester, Vermont, U.S.
- Died: March 11, 1844 (aged 31); Sackville, New Brunswick, Canada
- Education: Wilbraham Wesleyan Academy
- Occupations: school teacher; preceptress; author
- Spouse: Humphrey Pickard (m. 1841)
- Writing career
- Pen name: A Lady
- Language: English
- Genre: novels

Hannah Maynard Pickard (née, Thompson; pen name, A Lady; November 25, 1812 – March 11, 1844) was a 19th-century American school teacher, preceptress, and author. She wrote extensively for the Sabbath School Messenger, and some for the Guide to Holiness, and other periodicals. She was the author of two novels, several editions of which were published, Procrastination and The Widow's Jewels.

== Early life and education ==
Hannah Maynard Thompson was born in Chester, Vermont, November 25, 1812. Her parents were Ebenezer and Hannah M. (Sommerby) Thompson. They were of the Methodists faith. She had three older siblings.

At the age of three, the family moved to Concord, Massachusetts, where they stayed for ten years. She received her first instruction in Methodism there. As a child, Hannah was an avid reader. In 1826, the family moved to Wilbraham, Massachusetts when her parents took over the management of the Students’ Boarding Hall associated with Wilbraham Wesleyan Academy. While a student at the academy, she joined the Methodist Episcopal Church. In 1828, the family moved to Boston, but Hannah stayed behind at the school for a year before joining her family.

== Career ==
In Boston, she taught at the Bromfield Street Sabbath School and at the Russell Street Sabbath School. She wrote for the Sabbath School Messenger, Guide to Holiness, and other periodicals. She published two novels, and wrote poems, sketches, and prose.

In 1838, Thompson became a preceptress at the Wilbraham Academy, and in the spring of the following year, she met Humphrey Pickard, a student at the Wesleyan University in Middletown, Connecticut. After graduating in the summer of 1839, Humphrey returned to New Brunswick, Canada, but the couple wrote letters back and forth to each other. After her mother's death in the spring of 1841, Pickard returned to Boston to help her father. On October 2, 1841, in Boston, she married Pickard, and shortly afterwards, the couple moved to Saint John, New Brunswick, Canada where her husband had received an appointment to preach.

Their first child, Edward, was born on September 7, 1842, in Chelsea, Massachusetts, while she was visiting a sister. In the following year, the Pickards moved to Sackville, New Brunswick, Canada where Reverend Pickard served as principal of that city's Wesleyan Academy (now Mount Allison University. On February 19, 1844, a second child, Charles, was born who only survived a week.

== Death and legacy ==
Hannah Pickard died of heart failure, March 11, 1844, in Sackville, at the age of thirty-two. A book, Memoir and Writings of Mrs. Hannah Maynard Pickard, including her history, diary, correspondence, and some of her other writings, was published posthumously in Boston, in 1845, edited by her sister's husband, Rev. Edward Otheman.

== Publications ==
=== Novels ===
- Procrastination, or, Maria Louisa Winslow (1840)
- The Widow’s Jewels: In Two Stories (1844)

=== Posthumous ===
- Memoir and Writings of Mrs. Hannah Maynard Pickard (1845)
