= 8th Nova Scotia general election =

8th Nova Scotia general election may refer to:

- Nova Scotia general election, 1799, the 8th general election to take place in the Colony of Nova Scotia, for the 8th General Assembly of Nova Scotia
- 1894 Nova Scotia general election, the 30th overall general election for Nova Scotia, for the (due to a counting error in 1859) 31st Legislative Assembly of Nova Scotia, but considered the 8th general election for the Canadian province of Nova Scotia
