= James Cox =

James Cox may refer to:

== Politics ==
- James Cox (Nova Scotia politician) (died 1805), merchant and politician in Nova Scotia
- James Cox (New Jersey politician) (1753–1810), United States Representative from New Jersey, 1809–1810
- James M. Cox (1870–1957), American politician, Governor of Ohio and Democratic presidential nominee in 1920
- James P. Cox (1804–1866), member of the first legislature of the Wisconsin Territory

== Media ==
- James Cox (director) (born 1975), American film director
- James Cox (journalist) (1941–2024), British radio and television presenter and correspondent for the BBC

== Sports ==
- James Cox (quarterback) (born 1983), starting quarterback for the Colorado Buffaloes football team, 2005–2006
- James Cox (baseball), Negro league baseball player
- James Allen Cox (born 1977), American professional wrestler better known as James Storm
- J. B. Cox (James Brent Cox, born 1984), American baseball player
- Jamie Cox (born 1969), cricketer
- Jamie Cox (boxer) (born 1986), professional boxer from Swindon

== Business ==
- James Cox (inventor) (1723–1800), British jeweller, goldsmith and entrepreneur
- James M. Cox Jr. (1903–1974), American businessman, chair of Cox Enterprises
- James H. Cox (1810–1877), American teacher, businessman, legislator, judge

== Others ==
- James Cox (labourer) (1846–1925), New Zealand labourer, flax worker, swagger and agricultural worker
- James Charles Cox (1834–1912), Australian physician and naturalist
- James L. Cox (born 1942), American cardiothoracic surgeon
- James Renshaw Cox (1886–1951), American Roman Catholic priest and 1932 candidate for President of the United States
- James Cox (priest) (1654–1716), Irish Anglican priest

== See also ==
- Jim Cox (disambiguation)
- James Cocke, mayor of Williamsburg, Virginia
- James Cox Aikins (1823–1904), Canadian politician
