= James Cocks =

James Cocks may refer to:

- James Cocks (died 1750) (c. 1685–1750), MP for Reigate
- James Cocks (1773–1854), MP for Reigate
- James Somers Cocks (1790–1856), MP for Reigate

== See also ==
- James Cox (disambiguation)
