= Rusland =

Rusland may refer to:

- the Danish and Dutch name for Russia;
- Rusland, Cumbria, a village in Cumbria, England;
- Rusland Hall, a country house in Rusland, Cumbria;
- Rusland Pool, a small river in Rusland, Cumbria;
- Gregory Rusland, Surinamese politician. (Rusland may also refer to the German name for Russia "Russland".)
