= 11th Nova Scotia general election =

11th Nova Scotia general election may refer to:

- Nova Scotia general election, 1818, the 11th general election to take place in the Colony of Nova Scotia, for the 11th General Assembly of Nova Scotia
- 1906 Nova Scotia general election, the 33rd overall general election for Nova Scotia, for the (due to a counting error in 1859) 34th Legislative Assembly of Nova Scotia, but considered the 11th general election for the Canadian province of Nova Scotia
