= Richard Upham =

Canadian politician

Richard Upham (bap. 6 December 1716 – c. September 1775) was a political figure in Nova Scotia. He briefly represented Onslow Township in the Nova Scotia House of Assembly in 1775.

He was baptized in Malden, Massachusetts on 6 December 1716, the son of Richard Upham and Abigail Hovey. He married Elizabeth Hovey. On 15 July 1757, he married Elizabeth Putnam (née Nurse), a widow. Upham fought at the siege of Louisbourg in 1758. He first came to Halifax from Massachusetts, and was one of the original grantees of Onslow Township in 1759. Upham was named a justice of the peace in 1761. He was named captain in the local militia 30 July 1761. He was named collector of impost and excise at Cobequid on 28 April 1762. (Note: Cobequid in this context refers to the townships of Truro and Onslow.) Upham was also named as coroner for Onslow township on 21 March 1765. He compiled a census for Onslow and Truro in 1770. He was elected to the House of Assembly in a by-election, taking his seat June 12, 1775. He apparently died in September 1775.

His daughter Sarah married Nathaniel Marsters.
