= Thomas Roach =

Thomas Roach may refer to:

- Tom Roach (footballer) (born 1985), Australian rules footballer
- Thomas Roach (Canadian politician) (1769–1833), merchant and politician in Nova Scotia
- Thomas Roach (mayor), former mayor of White Plains, New York
