= North River, Nova Scotia =

Community in Nova Scotia, Canada

Coordinates: 45°25′32.03″N 63°15′13.01″W

North River in Nova Scotia

North River is a community in the Canadian province of Nova Scotia, located within Colchester County, and is close to Truro, Nova Scotia. It was settled in the 1760s as a slice of what was then The Onslow Township, which was one of the many townships set up by the British Government in Halifax, Nova Scotia to encourage planters to immigrate to Nova Scotia to work on the farmland. The Onslow Township was settled by mostly New England Planters from the areas around Boston, Massachusetts, and from New Hampshire. One of the most common of the occupations of these immigrants before their immigration was farming.

== Schools ==
North River's only school is North River Elementary School located on Mountain Lee Road. The school was built in 1961 with upgrades in 1964 and 2007. As of now, North River Elementary School has about 210 students, which are split into the grades from Pre-Primary to Grade 6.

== Important Roads ==
The Trans-Canada Highway is a highway that extends east-west across Canada between Victoria, British Columbia and St. John's, Newfoundland and Labrador, which passes through all ten Canadian provinces. The Highway passes above North River, Over the 311, and into Onslow.
