= Laurence Kavanagh Jr. =

Canadian politician

Laurence Kavanagh (1789 – June 22, 1862) was a merchant and political figure in Nova Scotia. He represented Cape Breton County from 1830 to 1836 and Richmond County from 1836 to 1840 in the Nova Scotia House of Assembly.

Kavanagh was the son of Laurence Kavanagh and Felicité LeJeune. Kavanagh was involved in the fishing trade. Around 1820, he married Catherine Murphy. He died in St. Peter's, Nova Scotia at the age of 73.
