= Jim Cox =

Jim Cox may refer to:

- Jim Cox (guard) (1920–2014), American football player
- Jim Cox (tight end) (born 1946), American football player
- Jim Cox (Australian politician) (born 1945), Tasmanian Labor politician and member of the Tasmanian House of Assembly
- Jim Cox (baseball) (born 1950), American Major League Baseball second baseman
- Jim Cox (historian), historian on the subject of radio programming
- Jim Cox (American politician) (born 1969), Pennsylvania state representative

== See also ==
- James Cox (disambiguation)
