= James Whidden Allison =

Canadian politician

James Whidden Allison (December 1, 1795 – March 19, 1867) was a farmer and political figure in Nova Scotia. He represented Newport township in the Nova Scotia House of Assembly from 1836 to 1840.

He was born in Horton, Kings County, Nova Scotia (later Wolfville), the son of John Allison and Nancy Whidden. His family moved to Newport around 1804. In 1821, Allison married Margaret Elder. He died in Mantua, Newport township at the age of 71.

His son David served as president of Mount Allison University. His son William Henry was a member of the provincial assembly and the Canadian House of Commons.
