= William Dickson (Nova Scotia politician) =

Canadian politician (c. 1779 – 1834)

William Dickson (c. 1779 – 15 February 1834) was a politician in Nova Scotia. He represented the town of Truro in the Nova Scotia House of Assembly from 1818 to 1826.

He was born in nearby Onslow, the son of Charles Dickson and Amelia Bishop, emigrants from Connecticut. In 1801, he married Rebecca Pearson, the daughter of Thomas Pearson, who also represented Truro in the provincial assembly. His brothers, Robert and Thomas, and brother-in-law, Samuel George William Archibald, also served in the Nova Scotia House of Assembly.
