= Abraham Gesner (politician) =

Nova Scotian politician (1756–1851)

Abraham Gesner (1756–1851) was a farmer and political figure in Nova Scotia. He represented Annapolis County in the Nova Scotia House of Assembly from 1824 to 1827.

Abraham was born near Tappan, New York (now Rockleigh, New Jersey), the son of John Henry and Famicha (Brouwer) Gesner, and was primarily of German descent. Serving as a Loyalist with the King's Orange Rangers during the American Revolution, he purchased a commission of major in the British Army. With his twin brother Henry (father of Abraham Pineo Gesner, a geologist and writer, best known as the inventor of kerosene), he came to Nova Scotia in 1779 and eventually settled on a farm at Belleisle in the township of Granville. Abraham became prominent in the province for fruit culture on the farm. In 1787 he married Elizabeth Steadman and they were the parents of twelve children. He was elected to the provincial assembly in 1824 after Thomas Ritchie resigned, but did not run for re-election in 1827, citing his age and an interest in pursuing personal matters. Abraham died at Belleisle at the age of 94.
