= Raid on Annapolis Royal (1781) =

1781 battle

- Part of the American Revolutionary War
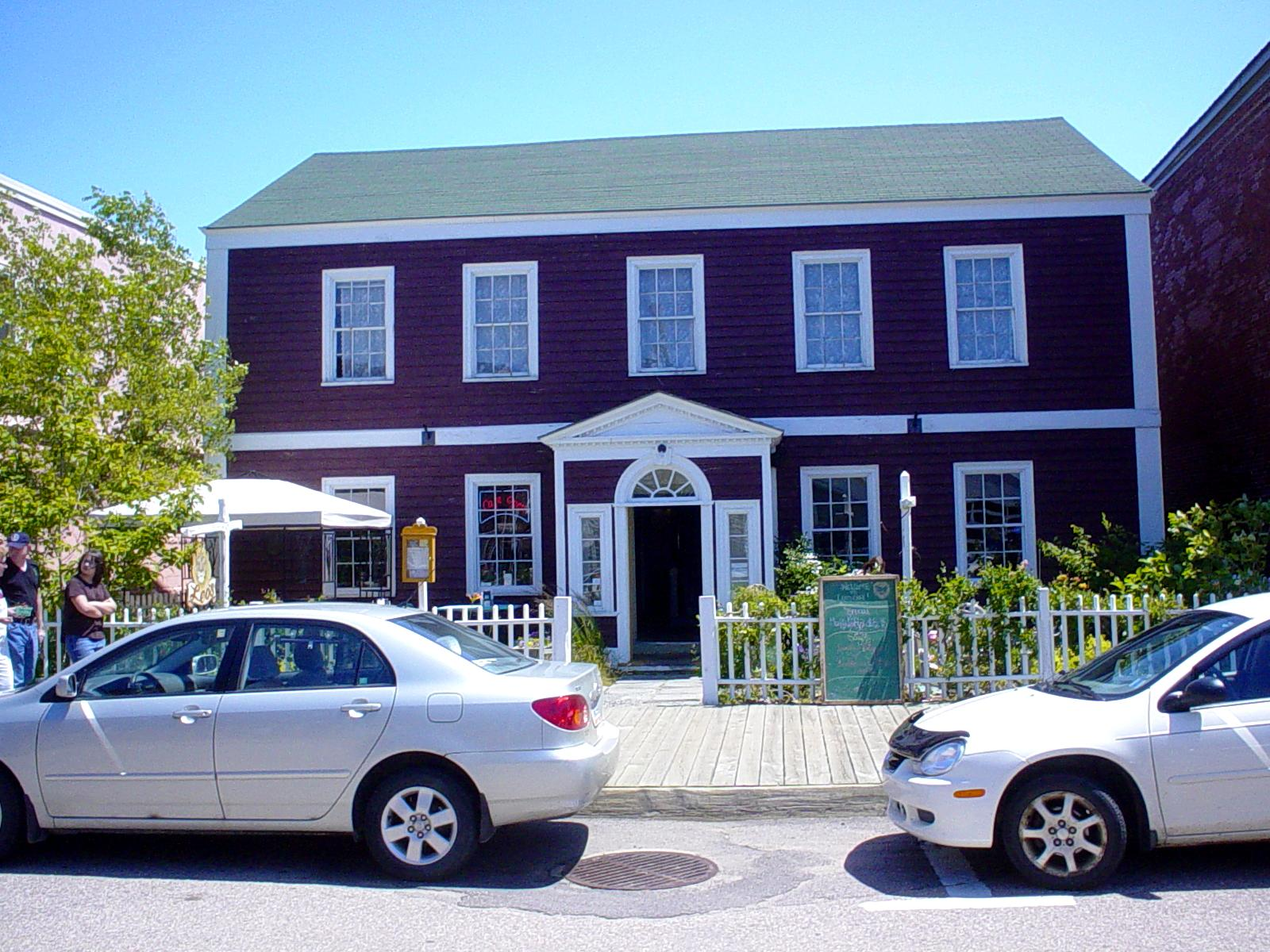
- John Ritchie House, "Governor of Annapolis" was taken captive in the raid
Date	29 August 1781
Location	Annapolis Royal, Nova Scotia
Result	American victory

Belligerents
United States	Great Britain

Commanders and leaders
William Morgan; John Curtis (naval officer)	(Kingdom of Great Britain) Commander Phineas Lovett (Kingdom of Great Britain) John Ritchie (POW) (Kingdom of Great Britain) Thomas Williams (POW)

Strength
80 privateers	Local militia; 3 soldiers

Casualties and losses
1 killed (Acadian pilot)	No casualties

The Raid on Annapolis Royal took place on 29 August 1781 during the American Revolutionary War. The raid involved two American privateers - the Resolution (commanded by William Morgan) and the Reprisal (commanded by John Curtis) - attacking and pillaging Annapolis Royal, Nova Scotia in revenge of the defeat of the Penobscot Expedition. The privateers took captive the commander of the militia John Ritchie, described as the "Governor of Annapolis." One historian described it as "one of the most daring and dramatic raids upon Nova Scotia."

== Background ==
During the American Revolution, Americans regularly attacked Nova Scotia by land and sea. American privateers devastated the maritime economy by raiding many of the coastal communities, The raids intensified after the British victory over the Penobscot Expedition, such as the numerous raids on Liverpool and Lunenburg.

On 31 March 1781, a British ship off Halifax, Nova Scotia captured Captain Amos Potter of the American privateer Resolution (6 guns, 25 men), while his crew escaped. Captain William Morgan took command of the Resolution. Five months later, Potter's crew sought revenge on the British by sacking Annapolis Royal.

== Battle ==
Captain William Morgan on Resolution was joined by another American privateer Reprisal (8 guns, 10 swivels, 60 men) under the command of Captain John Curtis, totalling 80 men. They secured the blockhouse from the three soldiers in the town. Over the next hours, the privateers rounded up the militia, under the command of John Ritchie and lieutenant-colonel Phineas Lovett, and disarmed and imprisoned them. They spiked the town cannon. The privateers then pillaged the valuables from the whole town, taking silverware, provisions, furniture, bedding, clothing and so forth. Ritchie's black servant (whether she was a free black or a slave is unknown) pleaded on behalf of Ritchie's sick wife to leave some provisions and the privateers gave her tea and sugar.

They retreated to Goat Island and took prisoner both Thomas Williams, the senior ordinance storekeeper and commissary of provisions to the garrison at Fort Anne (and grandfather of Sir Fenwick Williams), and John Ritchie who the Boston Gazette referred to as the "Governor of Annapolis." They also took captive a Sergeant and 5-6 others. They later exchanged "the Governor" for their former commander Captain Potter and returned to Boston the following month.

== Aftermath ==
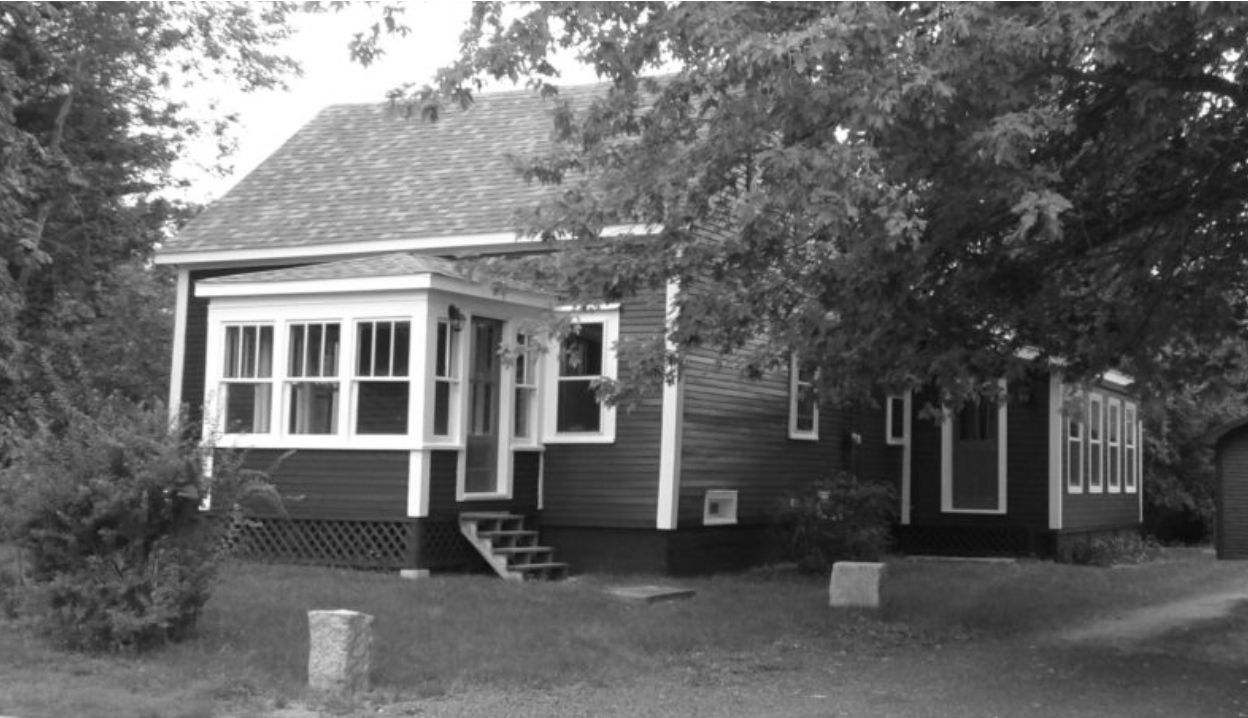
Thomas Williams House, Williams taken captive, Annapolis Royal, Nova Scotia

American privateers remained a threat to Nova Scotian ports for the rest of the war. Captain William Chair Burnaby was in command of the sloop Merlin at Annapolis Royal.

On 1 January 1782, British Captain John Curtis captured an armed schooner in the Bay of Fundy commanded by Captain Hodgkins. The privateer Lively under the command of John Augusta Dunn fell in with armed schooner.

On 8 May 1782, Buckram (8 guns, 40 men) captured the privateer sloop Lively under the command of John Augustus Dunn (8 guns) and the crew escaped. The Buckram rescued Captain Mowatt who was being chased by the American privateer close to Goat Island. Mowat and his crew escaped in the woods.

On March 15, 1782, Potter returned from Boston in Resolution and captured the schooner Two Sisters off Pearl Island, Mahone Bay (formerly Green Island), stole all the provisions on board and released it.

== See also ==
- Military history of Nova Scotia
- American Revolution - Nova Scotia theatre
