= David Allison (college president) =

Canadian professor, administrator and author

David Allison (July 3, 1836 – February 13, 1924) was a Canadian professor, administrator and author. He was president both of Mount Allison College and later of Mount Allison University from 1869 to 1878 and from 1891 to 1911, respectively.

He was born in Newport, Nova Scotia, the son of James Whidden Allison and Margaret Elder. He was educated at the Dalhousie Collegiate School (later Dalhousie University), at the Wesleyan Academy in Sackville, New Brunswick, founded by Charles Frederick Allison, and at Wesleyan University in Connecticut, from which he received a B.A. in 1859 and an M.A. three years later.

Allison married Elizabeth Powell in 1862; she died in 1898. Also in 1862, he became a professor of classics at Mount Allison College. He succeeded Humphrey Pickard as president of the college in 1869. In 1877, Allison was named superintendent of education for Nova Scotia. He married Ellen Elizabeth Cummins in 1902. Allison developed an English grammar for use in Nova Scotia schools and also wrote a three volume History of Nova Scotia which was published in 1916. He returned to Mount Allison University in 1891 for his second term as president.

He died in Halifax at the age of 87.

His brother William Henry served as a member of the Canadian House of Commons.

Academic offices
Preceded by Humphrey Pickard	President of Mount Allison University; 1869–1878	Succeeded by James Robert Inch
Preceded by James Robert Inch	President of Mount Allison University; 1891–1911	Succeeded by Byron Crane Borden
