= Charles Dickson (merchant) =

Canadian politician (1746–1796)

Charles Dickson (1746 – 3 September 1796) was a merchant, shipbuilder, farmer, and political figure in Nova Scotia. He represented Onslow Township in the Nova Scotia House of Assembly from 1776 to 1777 and from 1783 to his death in 1796.

He was born in New England and moved to King's County in Nova Scotia at a young age. In 1772, he married Amelia Bishop, daughter of John and Mary Bishop. Around the same time, Dickson settled in Onslow. He served as registrar of deeds for Colchester County from 1777 to 1796 and was also a justice of the peace. During a visit to the West Indies in 1796, he contracted yellow fever and died at Halifax on his return.

His sons Thomas, Robert, and William became members of the provincial assembly. His daughter Elizabeth married Samuel George William Archibald, also a member of the assembly.

== Family ==
- John (7 June 1773) married 20 October 1796 to Lydia Hamilton.
- Charles (6 April 1775) married 31 December 1799 to Rachel Todd Archibald.
- Robert (8 July 1777) married 1798 to Lavinia DeWolf (5 September 1774)
- William (1779) married 29 January 1801 to Rebecca Pearson.
- Abigail (1781) married 27 February 1798 to Andrew Wallace.
- Sarah (1783) died young.
- Mary (1785-twin) married 1803 to John Murray Upham.
- Olivia (1785-twin) married 5 February 1801 to David Archibald.
- Elizabeth (1786) married 16 March to Samuel George William Archibald.
- Thomas (1788) married Sarah Ann Patterson.
- Lavinia (unknown) married 27 April 1823 to John Burnyeat.
