= Isaac Hatfield =

Canadian politician (1826–1872)

MLA for Argyle township
- In office 1863–1867

Personal details
- Born: 1826; Tusket Lakes, Nova Scotia
- Died: October 20, 1872; Tusket Lakes, Nova Scotia
- Political party: Liberal-Conservative
- Spouse: Sarah Harding
- Occupation: Merchant

Isaac Smith Hatfield (1826 – October 20, 1872) was a merchant and political figure in Nova Scotia. He represented Argyle township in the Nova Scotia House of Assembly from 1863 to 1867 as a Liberal-Conservative.

He was born at Tusket Lakes, Yarmouth County, Nova Scotia, the son of Captain James Hatfield and Elizabeth Lent, the daughter of James Lent. He married the widow Sarah Harding (née Cochrane). Hatfield served as a justice of the peace from 1855 to 1872. He lived at Tusket, Nova Scotia, where he operated a general store. Hatfield drowned in the Tusket Lakes at the age of 46.

His brother Forman later also served in the provincial assembly.
