= Grizelda Elizabeth Cottnam Tonge =

Nova Scotian poet (1803–1825)

Grizelda Elizabeth Cottnam Tonge, who wrote under the name Portia, (1803–1825) was a Nova Scotian poet who has been called the "highly-gifted songstress of Acadia." Tonge's poetic talent, combined with the tragic circumstances of her early death, built her reputation as a pioneer of Nova Scotian literature.

Born in Windsor, Nova Scotia, Tonge was the daughter of William Cottnam Tonge, an orator. Her grandmother Martha Grace Cottnam Tonge and great grandmother Deborah Howe Cottnam were both poets. Although Tonge probably received little formal education, she was part of an educated family living in a university town.

In 1825, Tonge sailed to Demerara in what is now Guyana to join her father. Soon after her arrival in South America, she died of a tropical disease.

== Notable works ==
- "Lines composed at midnight . . . occasioned by the recollection of my sisters,"
- "To my dear grandmother, on her 80th birth day"
- "A hymn of praise"
- "Lines . . . composed in the church yard of Windsor, N.S., . . ."
- "Extempore lines, occasioned by seeing the corpse of Mary, youngest daughter of the Hon. James Fraser. . . ."
