= James Robert Inch =

Canadian educator (1835–1912)

President of Mount Allison University
- In office 1878–1891
- Preceded by: David Allison
- Succeeded by: David Allison

Personal details
- Born: 29 April 1835 New Jerusalem, New Brunswick
- Died: 13 October 1912 (aged 77) Amherst, Nova Scotia

James Robert Inch (29 April 1835 – 13 October 1912) was a Canadian educator.

Born in New Jerusalem, New Brunswick (now part of CFB Gagetown), Inch received his first-class teacher's licence in 1850 from the New Brunswick Normal School in Saint John, New Brunswick. In 1854, he became a teacher at the Wesleyan Academy at Mount Allison in Sackville, New Brunswick. He received a Bachelor of Arts degree in 1864 and a Master of Arts degree in 1869 from Mount Allison Wesleyan College. He was president of Mount Allison University from 1878 to 1891.

He died in Amherst, Nova Scotia on 13 October 1912.
