= John Elder (politician) =

Nova Scotian politician

John Elder (d. before 1868) was a farmer and political figure in Nova Scotia. He represented Falmouth township in the Nova Scotia House of Assembly from 1836 to 1840 as a Conservative.

He was the son of Matthew Elder and Rebecca Jenkins, natives of Ireland. Elder married Elizabeth, the daughter of John Allison. He served as town clerk for Falmouth from 1809 to 1825, as well as overseer of the poor and trustee of the public lands.
