= Justice Ritchie =

Justice Ritchie may refer to:

- Roland Ritchie (1910–1988), puisne justice of the Supreme Court of Canada
- William Johnstone Ritchie (1813–1892), chief justice of the Supreme Court of Canada

== See also ==
- Judge Richey (disambiguation)
- Judge Ritchie (disambiguation)
