= John Chipman (Nova Scotia politician) =

Canadian politician

John Chipman (December 18, 1744 – April 29, 1836) was a farmer, judge and political figure in Nova Scotia. He represented the Cornwallis Township in the Nova Scotia House of Assembly from 1776 to 1784.

He was born in Newport, Rhode Island, the son of Handley Chipman and Jean Allen, and came to Cornwallis, Nova Scotia with his family. In 1769, he married Eunice Dickson, the daughter of Charles Dickson. He was elected to the provincial assembly in a by-election held after Samuel Willoughby's seat was declared vacant for non-attendance. Chipman was a justice of the peace and judge in the Inferior Court of Common Pleas for King's County. He served as keeper of the rolls for King's County from 1789 until his death at the age of 91.

His son Jared Ingersol Chipman also served in the provincial assembly.
