= Daniel McCurdy =

Nova Scotian politician (1768–1815)

Daniel McCurdy (April 1, 1768 – July 18, 1815) was a teacher, farmer and political figure in Nova Scotia. He represented Onslow Township in the Legislative Assembly of Nova Scotia from 1799 to 1806.

He was born in Londonderry, Nova Scotia, the son of Alexander McCurdy and Jennet Guthrie, immigrants from Ireland. In 1792, McCurdy married Eunice Wright. He died in Onslow at the age of 47.
