= Samuel Archibald (politician, born 1742) =

Nova Scotian politician

Samuel Archibald (11 November 1742 – 15 February 1780) was an Irish-born politician, farmer, and merchant in Nova Scotia. He represented Truro Township in the Legislative Assembly of Nova Scotia from 1775 to 1777.

He was born in Derry, the son of David Archibald and Elizabeth Elliott, and went to Londonderry, New Hampshire with his parents in 1757. Archibald settled in Truro Township in 1762 and married Rachel Duncan. Archibald, who was a lumber dealer, served as town clerk for Truro from 1771 until his death. He died in the West Indies at the age of 37.

His son Samuel George William Archibald and his grandson Charles Dickson Archibald also served in the assembly.
