= Judge Richey =

Judge Richey may refer to:

- Charles Robert Richey (1923–1997), judge of the United States District Court for the District of Columbia
- Mary Anne Richey (1917–1983), judge of the United States District Court for the District of Arizona

== See also ==
- Judge Ritchie (disambiguation)
- Justice Ritchie (disambiguation)
