= Benajah Collins =

Canadian politician

Benajah Collins (October 29, 1734 – 1820) was a merchant and political figure in Nova Scotia. He represented Queen's County in the Nova Scotia House of Assembly from 1784 to 1797. He was born in Chatham, Massachusetts, the son of Joseph Collins and Abigail Crowell, and later settled in Liverpool, Nova Scotia. Collins married Susannah Tracy. He was involved in the fisheries and coastal trade, owning a number of ships. Collins was also a justice in the Inferior Court of Common Pleas for Queen's County. He was elected to the assembly in a 1784 by-election held after Nathaniel Freeman's seat was declared vacant for non-attendance. In 1797, Collins went back to Massachusetts, settling in Danvers. He returned to Liverpool in 1815 to dispose of his property there; he died in Danvers several years later.

His son George also served in the provincial assembly. His daughter Susanna married James Taylor and their son William Benajah Taylor later served in the assembly.
