= Winckworth Tonge =

Canadian politician

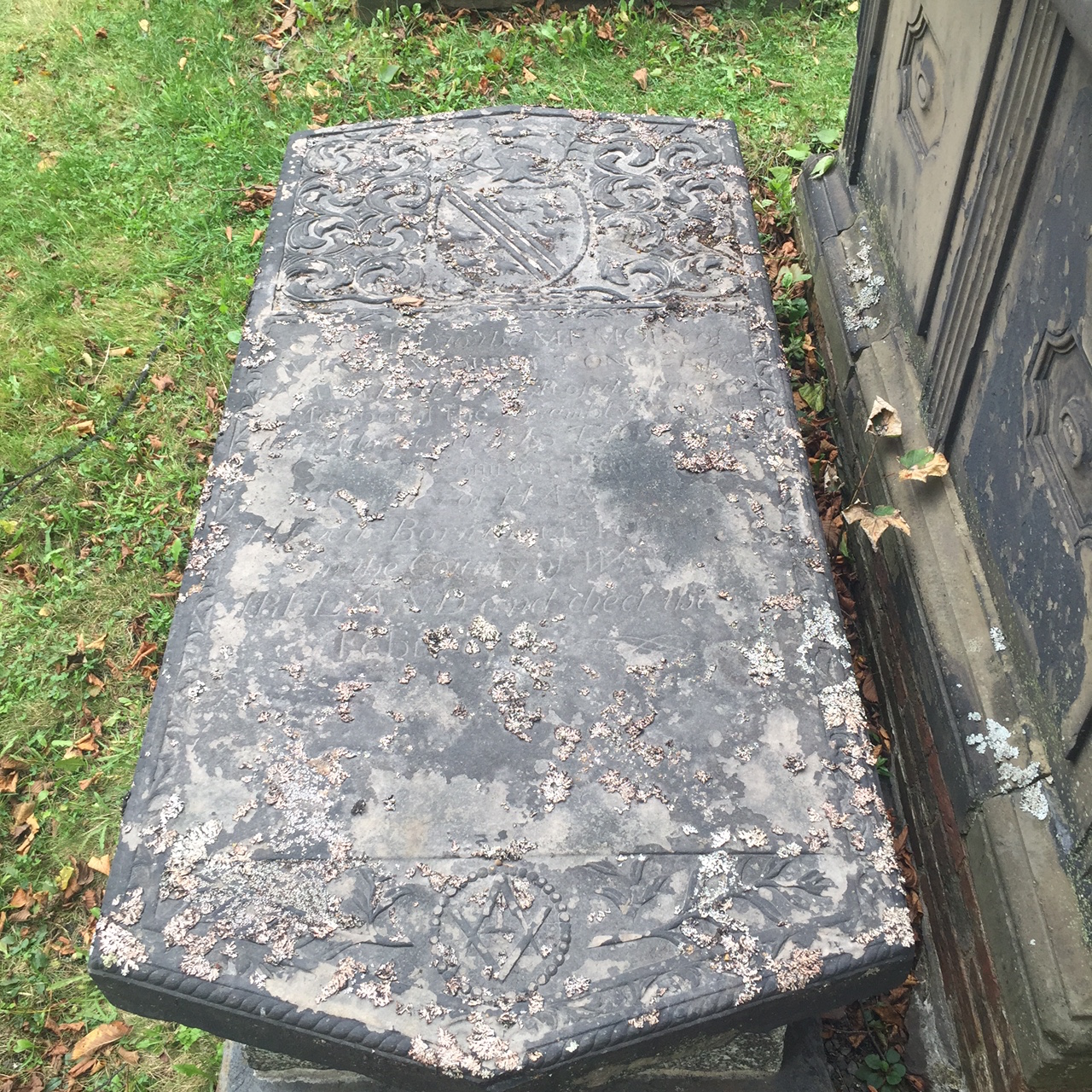
Winckworth Tonge, Old Burying Ground (Halifax, Nova Scotia)

Winckworth Tonge (4 February 1727 – 2 February 1792) was an Anglo-Irish soldier who served in North America, where he became a land owner and political figure in Nova Scotia after his military service. He represented Cumberland County from 1759 to 1760, King's County from 1765 to 1783 and Hants County from 1785 to 1792 in the Nova Scotia House of Assembly.

== Biography ==
Winckworth Tonge was born in County Wexford, Ireland to a Protestant family. In 1743, he served as a volunteer in the expedition led by Captain Charles Knowles (later a Rear Admiral) against the Spanish settlements and ships in the Caribbean and Central America. Tonge then served with Colonel Hugh Warburton in the 45th Regiment of Foot first at Gibraltar and then at the Fortress of Louisbourg (1746 to 1749). His regiment was assigned to garrison the new town of Halifax, Nova Scotia, where a fort was built. Tonge also took part in the Battle of Fort Beauséjour, where he was wounded in action. In 1758, he took part in the siege of Louisbourg and, in 1759, served with General Wolfe at the Battle of the Plains of Abraham.

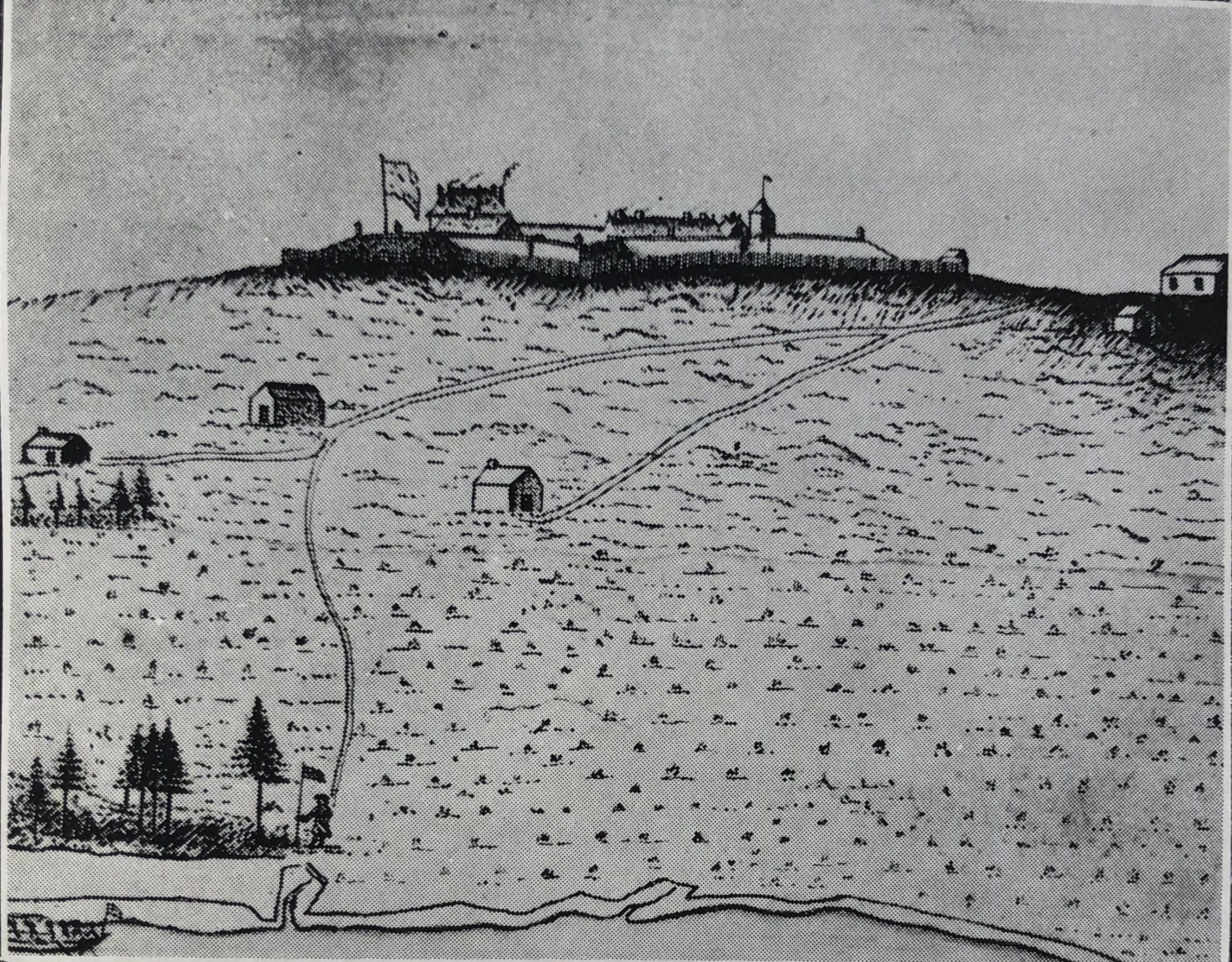
Fort Beausejour in 1755 by Winckworth Tonge

After retiring from the army, Tonge received grants of land in Nova Scotia, where he settled. He married Martha Grace Cottnam and they had a family. Their son William Cottnam later became an attorney and a judge. Like his father, he was elected as a member of the Nova Scotia legislative assembly.

Tonge was commissioned as a colonel in the local militia and served as justice of the peace. He also served as justice of the Inferior Court of Common Pleas for Hants County and provincial superintendent of roads, bridges, and public works. In 1773, Tonge was named naval officer for Nova Scotia, as tensions increased in the Thirteen Colonies between some groups and the British colonial governments. After suffering losses at the hands of American privateers during the American Revolutionary War, Tonge had to sell most of his property later in his life. He died in 1792 at Halifax.

== Legacy ==
- namesake of Tonge's Island, Tantramar Marsh, New Brunswick
- His son Captain William Peter Tonge participated in the action of 21 July 1781
- His son William Cottnam Tonge is the namesake of Tonge Hill, Windsor, Nova Scotia
- Wentworth Road, Windsor, Nova Scotia is a corruption of Winckworth Road, which was named after Winckworth Tonge.
