= Robert Dickson (Nova Scotia politician) =

Canadian farmer and politician (1777–1835)

Robert Dickson (8 July 1777 – 10 November 1835) was a farmer and political figure in Nova Scotia. He represented Onslow township in the Nova Scotia House of Assembly from 1818 to 1826 and from 1830 to 1836.

He was born in Onslow, Nova Scotia, the son of Charles Dickson and Amelia Bishop. In 1798, he married Lavinia DeWolf. Dickson was a justice of the peace and a colonel in the militia. He died in office at the age of 58. His brothers, William and Thomas, and brother-in-law, Samuel George William Archibald, also served in the Nova Scotia House of Assembly.
