= George Gracie =

Canadian politician (c.1747–1807)

George Gracie (c. 1747 – November 25, 1807) was a Scottish-born merchant, shipowner and political figure in Nova Scotia. He represented Shelburne County in the Legislative Assembly of Nova Scotia from 1798 to 1806.

He emigrated to Boston, later moving as a loyalist to Nova Scotia. Gracie married Ann Marie Campbell on 8 June 1803. He was co-owner with James Cox of the privateer ship Nelson. Gracie, who was blind, was involved in the whaling industry until Great Britain revoked the colony's whaling privileges. He died by drowning while travelling between Shelburne and Halifax.
