= Robert Blair (politician) =

Canadian politician

Robert Blair (c. 1782 – 1861) was an English-born judge and politician in Nova Scotia. He represented Cumberland County in the Nova Scotia House of Assembly from 1821 to 1825.

He was born in Castle Bromwich, Warwickshire. Blair was named a justice in the Inferior Court of Common Pleas in 1820. He was elected to the provincial assembly in an 1821 by-election held after the death of George Oxley. Blair submitted his resignation in 1825 when he returned to England. However, when the assembly voted on the acceptance of his resignation, the motion was defeated so his seat remained empty until 1826. Blair died in Switzerland at the age of 78.
