= Samuel R. Marshall =

American lawyer

- Occupation: President of Insurance Federation of Pennsylvania
- Known for: Insurance lobbying

Samuel R. "Sam" Marshall is a prominent lobbyist in Pennsylvania, where he is president and CEO of the Insurance Federation of Pennsylvania. Prior to that, he worked as a lawyer in the insurance industry.

He was named to the PoliticsPA list of "Sy Snyder's Power 50" list of influential individuals in Pennsylvania politics in 2002 and 2003. In 2003, he was named to the PoliticsPA "Power 50" list, where he was described as "an influential player in Harrisburg." In 2003, he was named to the Pennsylvania Report "Power 75" list, where it was noted that he was "at the top of his game" with the Republican takeover of the Pennsylvania General Assembly. In 2009, the Pennsylvania Report named him to "The Pennsylvania Report 100" list of influential figures in Pennsylvania politics, where Marshall's "clout that few in Harrisburg can match" was felt through his "large availability of PAC funds and impressive network."
