= Jared Ingersol Chipman =

Canadian politician

Jared Ingersol Chipman (May 22, 1788 – June 3, 1832) was a lawyer, judge and political figure in Nova Scotia. He represented the town of Shelburne in the Nova Scotia House of Assembly from 1818 to 1826.

He was born in Cornwallis, Nova Scotia, the son of John Chipman and Eunice Dickson, who was the daughter of Charles Dickson. He married Mary Sawyer, probably in 1814. He practiced law in Shelburne and Halifax. After his term in office, Chipman served as sheriff for Halifax County and was judge in the Nova Scotia Inferior Court of Common Pleas.
