= Nathan Utley =

Canadian politician

MLA for Yarmouth township
- In office 1799–1804

Personal details
- Born: February 15, 1743 Windham, Connecticut
- Died: 1804 Nova Scotia
- Spouse(s): Hannah Durkee, Anna Ellenwood
- Occupation: Justice of the peace, customs officer, politician

Nathan Utley (February 15, 1743 – 1804) was an American-born sailor and political figure in Nova Scotia. He represented Yarmouth Township in the Legislative Assembly of Nova Scotia from 1799 to 1804.

He was born in Windham, Connecticut, the son of Jeremiah Utley and Mary Frink. He was married twice: first to Hannah Durkee in 1762 and then to the widow Anna Ellenwood (née Clarke) in 1781. Utley came to Yarmouth with his family in 1770. He served as justice of the peace and customs collector. Utley died in office in 1804.
