= Joseph Allison (Canadian politician) =

Canadian politician

Joseph Allison (c. 1755 – November 23, 1806) was an Irish-born farmer and political figure in Nova Scotia. He represented Horton Township in the Nova Scotia House of Assembly from 1799 to 1806.

He was born in Drumahoe in County Londonderry, the son of Joseph Allison and Alice Polk (or Pollock'), and came to Nova Scotia with his parents in 1769. Allison married Alice Harding, the daughter of a Loyalist. He died in Horton.

His brother John also served in the assembly.
