= Onslow (given name) =

Onslow is a masculine given name and nickname which may refer to:

- Onslow Humphreys (c. 1893– ?), Australian rugby union player
- Onslow Stearns (1810–1878), American railroad builder and politician
- Onslow Stevens (1902–1977), American actor
- Onslow Whiting (1872–1937), English sculptor
- Onslow (Keeping Up Appearances), British TV character
