= Rusland Hall =

Country house in England

Coordinates: 54.2906°N 3.0162°W

Rusland Hall is a country house in the English Lake District. The present building dates from about 1720 (306 years ago). The Hall was owned by the Rawlinson family in the 17th and 18th centuries, and by the family of Beatrice Webb in the 19th century. For a time in the later 20th century it housed a museum of mechanical musical instruments, then becoming the home of Mike Dwan and his family and previously a weekend home to the Ramsden family from 1995 - 2002.

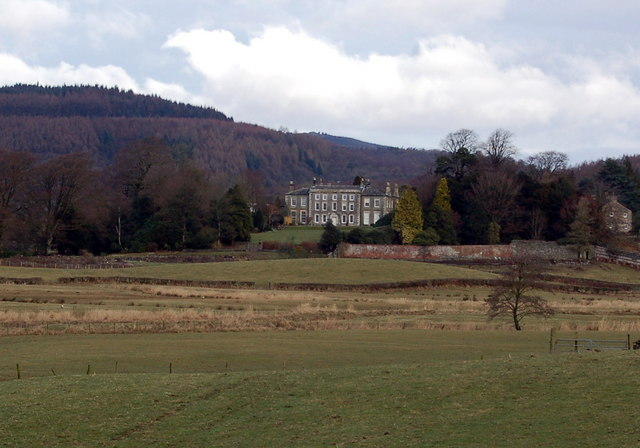
Rusland Hall

== Location ==
Rusland Hall stands at the head of the Rusland valley near to Rusland cross, between the foot of Windermere and Coniston. On either side of the approach road to Rusland Hall are 400 acres (1.6 km^{2}) of broadleaved deciduous woodland, rich in wildlife, clothing the valley sides. The valley sides are drained by many becks which converge to form the stream called Rusland Pool.

The hall's grid reference is SD3388.

== History ==
The main house (on the site of an earlier building) was built in about 1720 (and extended in the 1840s) by the Rawlinson family who also owned nearby Graythwaite Hall. It is thought that the Rusland Beeches were planted during this time.

"Perception is Everything" painting of the Rusland Beeches by Marianne Birkby in Private Collection

Rusland Hall has had a colourful history. Captain William Rawlinson had been a Parliamentarian leader in the English Civil War between 1642 and 1651 but had been granted an indemnity on the Restoration. Much to William’s disapproval his eldest son, Thomas Rawlinson, was converted to the Quaker faith following George Fox’s visits to the Furness area. Rusland Hall remained the seat of the Rawlinson family until 1750 and then the Archibald family owned the hall until it was sold out of the traditional landed gentry in the mid 1900s. Rusland Hall was taken for a time in the late 1880s as a holiday home by the family of Beatrice Webb, who with her husband Sidney founded the London School of Economics. Her diaries, started at the age of 15, highlight her time at Rusland:

14 December, Rusland Hall - This autumn has been a very happy one for me... I have gained immensely by taking up drawing and music with a spirit of love instead of with a spirit of jealous ambition; and this I owe to Ruskin and to Goethe.

— Beatrice Webb, Diaries,

In later years the hall was a girls’ school, a children’s home, and a mechanical music museum between 1970 and 1987. Rusland Hall was bought by the Ramsden family in 1995 upon the death of the late James Ramsden. For seven years it was used as a weekend holiday home, by Harry Ramsden, his six children and many grandchildren but later sold in 2002. It is currently owned by Mike Dwan and his wife Amanda.

== Mechanical Music Museum ==
White peacock displaying at Rusland Hall

Rusland Hall Poster

John and Norma Birkby from Furness restored the fabric of the house to its former Georgian interior and exterior. Following restoration the house was opened to the public and became well known for a collection of mechanical musical instruments which was recognized as one of the largest collections in Europe. Many rare items from the period in musical history preceding the gramophone could be seen and heard, including self-acting pianos, pianolas and even pneumatic "orchestrelle" organs. The Museum was featured in many national magazines and media including BBC Woman's Hour.

Also on display was vintage photographic equipment including James Bond’s Minox spy camera. The Birkbys also introduced white peacocks to Rusland Hall where they thrived and entranced visitors to the house and gardens. John, Norma and son, Robin Birkby, went on to restore two hydro power projects in South Wales. Daughter, Marianne Birkby an artist went on to found Radiation Free Lakeland, a volunteer nuclear safety group based in South Lakeland.

== The gardens ==
The gardens are landscaped in the manner of Capability Brown with sweeping vistas and many specimen trees and shrubs. The Birkbys spent many years retrieving features such as the "Ha ha" ditch. Also time was spent restoring the old roses on the Lakeland slate steps and nurturing the ancient and rare trees such as the magnificent cedar of Lebanon which has been felled in recent years. Each custodian of the estate has the desire to put their stamp on the house and garden but its essence still remains.

Looking towards the Rusland Beeches
