= Sherman Denison =

Canadian politician

Sherman Denison (June 17, 1769 – 1853) was a political figure in Nova Scotia. He represented the town of Horton in the Nova Scotia House of Assembly from 1820 to 1826.

He was born in Horton, Nova Scotia, the son of David Sherman Denison and Sarah Fox. Denison was a colonel in the militia. In 1792, he married Nancy Crane, the daughter of Jonathan Crane. Denison was elected to the provincial assembly in an 1820 by-election held after his father-in-law's death. He also served as a justice of the peace.

Denison came from a political family, and his grandfather, Robert Denison, was a leader of the New England Planters who settled Nova Scotia and later represented King's County in the Nova Scotia House of Assembly from 1761 to 1764.
