= Lower Debert =

Community in Nova Scotia, Canada

Coordinates: 45°23′25.34″N 63°30′43.68″W

Lower Debert in Nova Scotia

Lower Debert is a small community in the Canadian province of Nova Scotia, located in Colchester County.
