= Charles Lot Church =

Canadian politician

Charles Lot Church (March 13, 1777 – April 14, 1864) was a political figure in Nova Scotia. He represented Lunenburg County in the Nova Scotia House of Assembly from 1820 to 1830.

He was born in Rhode Island (some sources say Fall River, Massachusetts), the son of Charles Church, and travelled with a group of United Empire Loyalists to Shelburne in 1783. He later settled near Chester, where he married Hannah Millett. In the assembly, Church spoke in favour of the removal of quitrents. He died in Chester in 1864.
