= Onslow Speedway =

Racing track in Nova Scotia, Canada

Coordinates: 45.3950°N 63.3026°W

Onslow Speedway is a once famous maritime racing track located in Onslow (near Truro), Nova Scotia, Canada, where many well known racers from the Maritimes once raced or started racing. The track ran as a dirt track from 1965 to 1979, as a paved track from 1980 to 1993, and then off and on from there.

Onslow Speedway ran from 1965 to 1978 as a dirt oval and then it was paved and ran from 1979 to 1994. Onslow was then used off and on for other events 1995-2005 (the Maritime Legends Tour was supposed to use the track in 2004).

Russel White bought it in 1980 and had the track listed for sale in 1983. Robert Mosher bought track in 1985. Gary McKinnon (member of the Canadian Motorsports Hall of Fame) bought it in 1999.

Scott Fraser (member of the Canadian Motorsports Hall of Fame) raced from 1986 to 1991 (started at age 16), in the Street Stock division. He was rookie of the year at Onslow Speedway in 1987. He also set a record for the most wins ever in a single year at Onslow Speedway. Wayne Smith (the Oval Outlaw) was Sportsman Champion At Onslow Speedway in 1988.

Scott Kelly started racing stock cars at age 16 on Onslow Speedway.

Paul Hebért raced at the Onslow Speedway in 1982.
