= James Cox (priest) =

Irish Anglican priest (1654–1716)

James Cox, M.A. (1654-1716) was an Irish Anglican priest.

Cox was born in County Cork and educated at Trinity College, Dublin. He was Prebendary of Ullard in Leighlin Cathedral from 1680 and Archdeacon of Ferns from 1684, holding both positions until his death.
