= Humphrey Pickard =

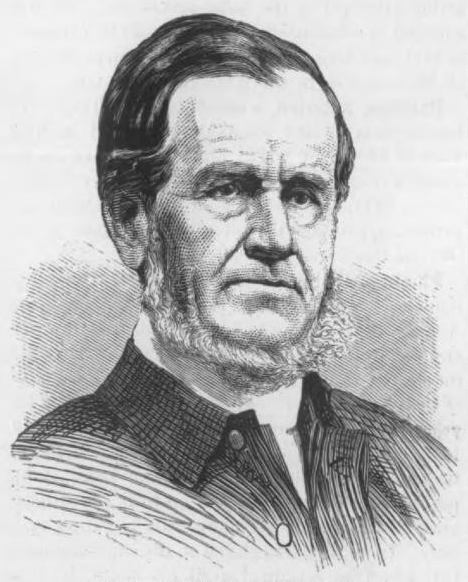
- Born: 10 June 1813; Fredericton, New Brunswick
- Died: 28 February 1890 (aged 76); Sackville, New Brunswick
- Occupations: educator and journalist

Humphrey Pickard (10 June 1813 – 28 February 1890) was a Canadian Methodist minister, educator, and journalist. He was the first president from 1862 to 1869 of Mount Allison Wesleyan College (later known as Mount Allison University).

== Biography ==
Humphrey Pickard was born in Fredericton, New Brunswick on 10 June 1813. He attended Wilbraham Wesleyan Academy from 1829 to 1831. He attended one year at Wesleyan University in 1831 before returning to Fredericton to become a businessman. In 1835, he became a Methodist minister and returned to Wesleyan University in 1837, graduating in 1839.

From 1869 to 1873, Pickard was editor of the Wesleyan, a Methodist newspaper in Halifax. He received a Doctor of Divinity degree from Wesleyan University in 1857.

He died in Sackville, New Brunswick on 28 February 1890.

Academic offices
Preceded by None	President of Mount Allison University; 1862-1869	Succeeded by David Allison
