= John Ritchie (merchant) =

Canadian politician (c. 1745–1790)

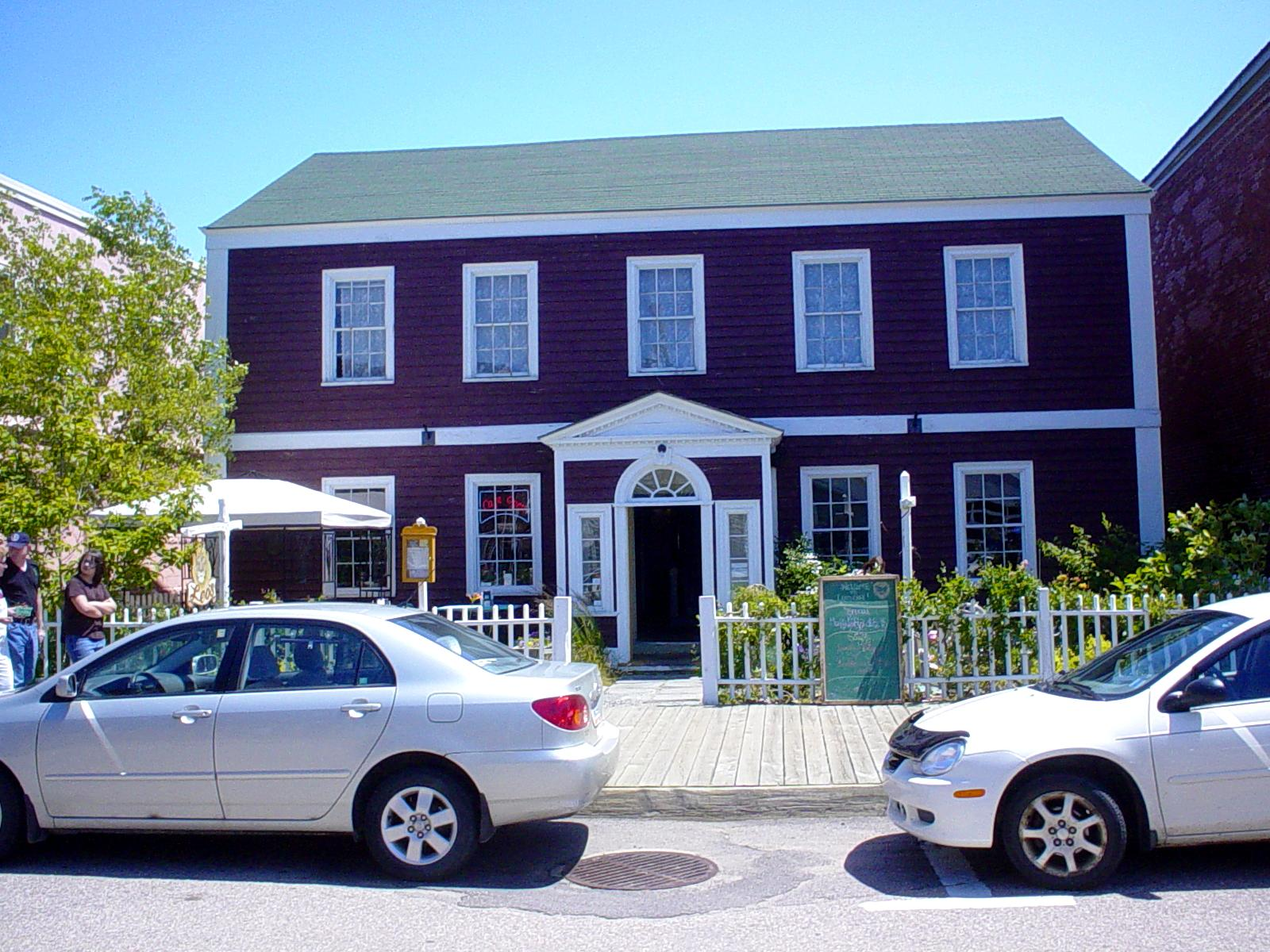
John Ritchie House, Annapolis Royal

John Ritchie (c. 1745 – July 20, 1790) was a Scottish-born merchant and politician in Nova Scotia. He represented Annapolis County in the Nova Scotia House of Assembly from 1783 to 1785.

Ritchie was born in or close to Glasgow and came to Boston, Massachusetts in 1770, moving to Annapolis Royal, Nova Scotia several years later. Around 1775, he married Alicia Maria Le Cain. He joined the militia company formed at the start of the American Revolution, becoming captain in 1779.

That same year, he was named justice of the peace. He was taken hostage in the Raid on Annapolis Royal (1781) and was released some time later in exchange for American prisoners. He was elected to the provincial assembly in a 1783 by-election held after Phineas Lovett was unseated for non-attendance. When he ran for reelection in Annapolis township in 1785, he was defeated by Stephen De Lancey. In 1786, he was named a justice in the Inferior Court of Common Pleas. Ritchie died at Annapolis Royal. His grandson William Johnstone Ritchie later served as chief justice of Canada.

He is buried at Garrison Cemetery (Annapolis Royal, Nova Scotia).
