= William Hersey Otis Haliburton =

Canadian politician

William Hersey Otis Haliburton (September 3, 1767 – July 7, 1829) was a lawyer, judge, and political figure in Nova Scotia. He represented Windsor Township in the Nova Scotia House of Assembly from 1806 to 1811, and represented Hants County from 1811 to 1824.

Haliburton was born in Windsor, Nova Scotia, the son of William Haliburton and Lusannah Otis. Haliburton studied law in Halifax and returned to Windsor to practice. He also served as an officer in the local militia.

In 1794, Haliburton married Lucy Chandler Grant (b. about 1774): Subsequent to her death in 1797, he married, secondly, in 1803, Susanna (Francklin) Davis, the daughter of Michael Francklin. He later served as Chief Justice of the Inferior Court of Common Pleas. He was President of the Court of Quarter Sessions for the Middle Division until his death at Windsor at the age of 61.

He was the father of Thomas Chandler Haliburton, the Nova Scotian jurist and author who emigrated to England and served as a Conservative Member of Parliament.
