= James Taylor (Nova Scotia politician) =

Nova Scotian politician (1771–1801)

James Taylor (1771 – January 15, 1801) was a merchant, seaman, tanner and political figure in Nova Scotia. He represented Queen's County in the Legislative Assembly of Nova Scotia from 1799 to 1801.

He was the son of William Taylor, a loyalist who came to Shelburne, Nova Scotia in 1783 and then moved to Liverpool in 1795. (His father William is buried in the Old Burying Ground (Halifax, Nova Scotia). In 1793, he married Susanna, the daughter of Benajah Collins. Taylor died in office at Liverpool.

His son William Benajah also served in the assembly.
