= Nathaniel Marsters =

Canadian politician

Nathaniel Marsters (June 6, 1758 – July 19, 1843) was a farmer, magistrate and political figure in Nova Scotia. He represented Onslow Township in the Nova Scotia House of Assembly from 1806 to 1818.

He was born in Massachusetts, the son of Jonathan Marsters and Mary Knowlton, who immigrated to Falmouth, Nova Scotia in 1760. Marsters moved to Onslow in 1784. He was married twice: to Sarah, the daughter of Richard Upham, in 1787 and then to Lydia Lynds in 1798. Marsters served as coroner for Colchester County from 1820 to 1843; he was also registrar of deeds. He died in Onslow at the age of 85.
