= Samuel Campbell (Canadian politician) =

Canadian politician (1788–1851)

Samuel Campbell (July 1788 – September 1851) was a political figure in Nova Scotia. He represented Annapolis County in the Nova Scotia House of Assembly from 1820 to 1826.

He was born in Shelburne, Nova Scotia, the son of Samuel Campbell, a United Empire Loyalist, and Alice Hogg. Campbell's mother married Colin Campbell after the death of his father. He was married twice: first to Catherine Marshall, the daughter of Samuel Marshall, then to Eliza Jones, the daughter of Cereno Upham Jones. He served as commissioner of the peace, as a member of the local Board of Land Commissioners and as a sub-collector of Customs at New Edinburgh. Campbell died in Weymouth.
