= Daniel Wier =

Nova Scotian politician

Daniel Wier (July 24, 1772 – December 13, 1842) was a farmer and political figure in Nova Scotia. He represented Newport township in the Nova Scotia House of Assembly from 1820 to 1826. His name also appears as Daniel Weir.

He was the son of Benjamin Wier and Esther MacNutt. He served as a captain in the militia for Hants County.
