= William O'Brien (Nova Scotia politician) =

Canadian politician

William O'Brien (June 25, 1782 – September 23, 1851) was a political figure in Nova Scotia. He represented Hants County from 1820 to 1826 and from 1834 to 1836 in the Nova Scotia House of Assembly.

He was born in Noel, Nova Scotia, the son of Isaac O'Brien and Mary Denny. In 1807, he married Jane F. Johnson. In 1809, he married Ann Putnam. He died in Noel at the age of 69.
