= Cereno Upham Jones =

Canadian politician (1767–1851)

Cereno Upham Jones (26 July 1767–17 June 1851) was a farmer, merchant and political figure in Nova Scotia. He represented Annapolis County in the Nova Scotia House of Assembly from 4 June 1817 to 1818.

He was born in Pittsfield, Massachusetts on July 26, 1767. He was the son of Elisha Jones Jr. and Mehitabel Upham. He was elected to the provincial assembly in by-election held on 4 June 1817 after Peleg Wiswall was named a judge. After completing his term in the assembly, Jones served as a justice of the peace and an associate judge in the county's Court of Common Pleas. He died at Weymouth, Nova Scotia.

His daughter Eliza married Samuel Campbell, who also served in the provincial assembly. His great grandson Herbert Ladd Jones was elected to the Canadian House of Commons.
