= Abraham Lent =

Canadian politician (1789–1873)

Abraham Lent (September 11, 1789 – March 4, 1873) was a land surveyor and political figure in Nova Scotia. He represented Shelburne County in the Legislative Assembly of Nova Scotia from 1818 to 1820 and from 1833 to 1836.

Born in Tusket, Nova Scotia, he was the son of James Lent, a loyalist of Dutch descent who came to Tusket from New York state in 1784, and Breechje Schmitt. Lent served as the local collector of customs. He married Mary Hatfield. Lent was also a justice of the peace and a colonel in the militia.

His home in Tusket, originally built by his uncle, who was also named Abraham Lent, and later used as a customs house, has been recognized as a heritage property by the province of Nova Scotia.
