= James Cox (Nova Scotia politician) =

Canadian politician (??–1805)

James Cox (died 1805) was a merchant and political figure in Nova Scotia. He represented Shelburne County in the Legislative Assembly of Nova Scotia from 1799 to 1805.

A loyalist, he came to Nova Scotia from Virginia, settling in Shelburne around 1792. Cox was married twice: first to Elizabeth and then to Margaret Sorrel in 1799. He served as a justice of the peace. With George Gracie, he was co-owner of the privateer ship Nelson. Cox apparently returned to New York sometime between September 1803 and November 1805.

His grandson George A. Cox also served in the assembly.
