= Charles Dickson Archibald =

Canadian politician

Charles Dickson Archibald FRS (October 31, 1802 – September 12, 1868) was a Canadian politician, lawyer, and businessman in Nova Scotia. He represented Truro Township in the Nova Scotia House of Assembly from 1826 to 1830.

He was born in Truro, Nova Scotia, the son of Samuel George William Archibald and Elizabeth Dickson, and studied at Pictou Academy. He went on to study law in his father's office. In 1830, he became chief clerk and registrar for the Supreme Court of Newfoundland; he resigned this post in 1831 and was succeeded by his brother Edward Mortimer. In 1832, he married Bridget Walker, heiress to the Rusland estate in Lancashire, England, and spent most of the remainder of his life in England. In 1840, Archibald became a fellow of the Royal Society of London. He retained an interest in Nova Scotia, helping to raise funds to develop an iron mine near Londonderry, Nova Scotia. The Arcadian Charcoal Iron Co was established with 20000 shares and Edward Wadham sent out to advise on the development of the company. He attended a conference in Toronto in 1851 regarding a railway linking the Maritimes to Upper and Lower Canada. He filed numerous patents while in England but was made bankrupt shortly before his death in London in 1868.
