= John Allison (Canadian politician) =

Canadian politician (1753–1821)

John Allison (1753 – March 1, 1821) was an Irish-born farmer, merchant and politician in Nova Scotia. He represented Newport Township in the Nova Scotia House of Assembly from 1811 to 1820.

He was born near Limavady, the son of Joseph Allison and Alice Polk (or Pollock). He came to Nova Scotia with his family in 1769. The family originally planned to settle in Philadelphia but their ship was wrecked on Sable Island and the family purchased a farm in Horton (later Wolfville) in Kings County, Nova Scotia. In 1779, Allison married Nancy Whidden. He lived in Horton but later moved to Newport. He died in Newport.

His son James and his brother Joseph also served in the provincial assembly. His daughter Elizabeth married John Elder.

Another son, Hon. Joseph Allison (1783-1839), was a successful West Indies merchant in Halifax, partnering first with his father-in-law, Charles Ramage Prescott and after his retirement in 1815, Enos Collins (Collins and Allison). He was a member of His Majesty's Council in 1837 and one of the founders of the 1819 Halifax Banking Company. (4)
