= George Collins (Nova Scotia politician) =

Canadian politician

George Collins (January 17, 1771 – May 6, 1813) was a mariner, merchant and political figure in Nova Scotia. He represented Queens County in the Nova Scotia House of Assembly from 1806 to 1813.

He was born in East Haddam, Connecticut, the son of Benajah Collins and Susanna Tracey. In 1794, Collins married Lydia, the daughter of Joseph Barss. Collins lobbied for the construction of the lighthouse on Coffin's Island, built in 1811. He died in Liverpool, Nova Scotia at the age of 42.
