= Samuel Chandler (politician) =

Canadian politician

Samuel Chandler (ca 1760 – September 9, 1851) was an American-born merchant and politician in Nova Scotia. He represented Londonderry Township in the Legislative Assembly of Nova Scotia from 1799 to 1811.

He was born in Hartford, Connecticut, the son of Joshua C. Chandler, a loyalist and former member of the Connecticut legislature, and Sarah Miles. His father, two sisters and a brother died in 1787 after they were shipwrecked on a voyage between Digby and Saint John. In 1796, Chandler married Susan Watson. He was the first sheriff for Cumberland County and also served as a captain in the militia. Chandler died in Wallace.

His son James Watson also served in the New Brunswick assembly. His sister Sarah married Amos Botsford and became the mother of William Botsford. His sister Mary married Joshua Upham.
