= Joseph Marshall (judge) =

Canadian politician

Joseph Marshall (ca 1755 – June 3, 1847) was an Irish-born farmer, judge and political figure in Nova Scotia. He represented Sydney County in the Nova Scotia House of Assembly from 1800 to 1811.

He was born in Glenkeen, the son of Joseph Marshall, and came to Georgia with his family at the age of 13. Marshall joined the loyalist forces during the American Revolution and fought in South Carolina. In 1783, along with former South Carolina Governor Lord Charles Montagu, Marshall came to Halifax with other former loyalist militia, later settling Guysborough, Nova Scotia. The following year, he was named a justice of the peace and served as a judge of the Inferior Court of Common Pleas from 1799 to 1841. He also served as a major in the local militia, later becoming lieutenant-colonel. His son John George succeeded him as a member of the provincial assembly. He died at home in Guysborough.
