= James Fleming (Nova Scotia politician) =

Nova Scotian politician (1741–1829)

James Fleming (1741 – 21 December 1829) was an Irish-born farmer, businessman and political figure in Nova Scotia. He represented Londonderry Township in the Nova Scotia House of Assembly from 1811 to 1826.

He was born in 1741 in Derry (Londonderry), Ireland. In 1766, he married Isabel Vance at Masstown in Colchester County, NS. Fleming was a justice of the peace. He died in Lower Debert, Nova Scotia.
