= Samuel Henry Bishop =

Canadian politician

Samuel Henry Bishop (July 27, 1767 – August 5, 1839) was a businessman and political figure in Nova Scotia. He represented Horton Township from 1811 to 1818 and Kings County from 1820 to 1830.

He was born in Halifax, the son of Captain William Bishop and Jemima Calkins. In 1798, he married Anna Jacobs. In 1804, he married Bathsheba Fitch. Bishop served as a justice of the peace from 1812 to 1830 and was also a colonel in the militia. He died in Wolfville at the age of 72.
