= John Bingay =

Canadian politician

John Bingay (August 12, 1786 – December 2, 1847) was a political figure in Nova Scotia. He represented Shelburne County in the Nova Scotia House of Assembly from 1818 to 1826.

He was born in Shelburne, Nova Scotia, the son of Thomas Bingay and Catherine Barry. His mother was Irish from County Cork, and her father was a British soldier who was posted to New York during the American Revolution, accompanied by his wife, and evacuated to Nova Scotia in 1783. In 1813, John married Sarah Van Buskirk. In 1821, he was named a justice of the peace. Bingay married Jane Margaret Bond after the death of his first wife. He served as high sheriff for Yarmouth County from 1822 to 1847. He died in Yarmouth.
