= John George Marshall =

Canadian politician

John George Marshall (1786 – April 7, 1880) was a lawyer, judge and political figure in Nova Scotia, Canada. He represented Sydney County in the Nova Scotia House of Assembly from 1811 to 1818 and from 1820 to 1823.

He was born in Country Harbour, Nova Scotia, the son of Captain Joseph Marshall. Marshall studied law with Lewis Morris Wilkins and was called to the bar in 1810. He first set up practice in Pictou but later moved to Halifax. In 1809, he married Catherine Jones. Marshall resigned his seat in 1823 after he was named chief justice of the Inferior Court of Common Pleas. He also served as president of the Courts of General and Special Sessions and justice of the peace for Cape Breton. Marshall retired when the Court of Common Pleas was abolished in 1841. He published The justice of the peace, and county & township officer, in the province of Nova Scotia, a textbook for local magistrates. He died in Halifax.

Marshall's daughter Margaret Ann married John George Bourinot. His nephew John Joseph Marshall also served in the province's assembly.
