= James Lent (Nova Scotia politician) =

Canadian politician (1753–1838)

James Lent (1753 – August 11, 1838) was a judge and political figure in Nova Scotia. He represented Shelburne County in the Nova Scotia House of Assembly from 1806 to 1818.

He was baptized on February 25, 1753, in Tappan, New Jersey, the son of Adolph Lent and Katje Harring. He was by trade a fisherman, catching herring, salmon and other fish for sale in local markets and for shipping to the West Indies. In 1774, he married Breechje "Brigitte" Schmitt. He was a loyalist during the American Revolution, serving with the New Jersey Volunteers. In 1785 he settled in Tusket, Nova Scotia, bringing with him several enslaved individuals, including Abigail Price and William and Anthony Berry. He became influential with the government of Nova Scotia, serving as both a justice of the peace and a justice in the Inferior Court of Common Pleas for Yarmouth County.

Once in Tusket, Lent freed Abigail Price and the Berry brothers, ensuring they were given land grants by the local government; their lots of land are shown on the confirmed grant of Tusket village in 1809.

Lent was elected to Nova Scotia Legislative Assembly and held his seat there from 1806-1818. He died in Tusket on 11 August 1839, aged 85, being predeceased by his wife in 1825. Their gravestones are the oldest in the Tusket cemetery.

His son Abraham and his grandsons Isaac Hatfield and Forman Hatfield also served in the provincial assembly.
