= Henry Rutherford =

Canadian politician

Henry Rutherford (31 January 1751 – 21 February 1807) was a merchant and political figure in Nova Scotia. He represented the Digby Township from 1793 to 1806 and Annapolis County from 1806 to 1807 in the Nova Scotia House of Assembly.

He came to Digby, Nova Scotia in 1783 as a United Empire Loyalist. He was involved in the fishing trade and the trade in the West Indies. Rutherford was also a contractor involved in building a road between Digby and Sissiboo (later Weymouth). In 1801, he was a commissioner for the construction of a road between Digby and Bear River. Phineas Lovett replaced him in the provincial assembly in May 1808 following his death.
