= John George Pyke =

English-born politician (1744–1828)

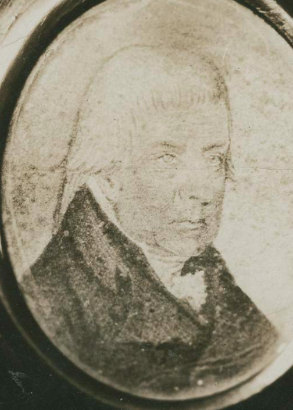
John George Pyke, Only image of survivor of the Raid on Dartmouth (1751); only known image of a passenger of the Alderney

John George Pyke (4 January 1744 – 3 September 1828) was an English-born merchant and political figure in Nova Scotia. He represented Halifax County from 1779 to 1793 and Halifax Township from 1793 to 1800 and from 1802 to 1818 in the Nova Scotia House of Assembly. He also became head of the Police department. He survived the Raid on Dartmouth (1751) but his father Abraham did not.

== Background ==
He was the only child of (John) Abraham Pyke and Ann Scrope of Yorkshire. He came to Nova Scotia with his parents on the Alderney in 1750, though he was educated in England. A year after his arrival in Canada his father was killed at Dartmouth by the Mi'kmaqs. His father was buried in an unmarked grave in the Old Burying Ground (Halifax, Nova Scotia). Two months later, John's mother married Richard Wenman.

At St. Paul's, Halifax in August, 1772, Pyke married Elizabeth Allan, the daughter of Major William Allan by his wife Isabella, daughter of Sir Eustace Maxwell. Elizabeth Pyke was the sister of John Allan. John Pyke inherited his stepfather's properties, including a brewery and land on Spring Garden Road, in 1781. Pyke also served as magistrate in charge of the police, fire warden and colonel in the local militia. He was also Grand Master for the Freemasons. Pyke was also a member of the Charitable Irish Society of Halifax. He died in Halifax.

The Pykes were the parents of seven children: George Pyke was the eldest son, and another son, Lieutenant Wincknatte Pyke (d.1813) of the 7th Royal Fusiliers, was killed at the Siege of San Sebastian. One of their daughters, Anne, married James Irvine. Their youngest daughter Isabella married the Honourable Charles Hill.
