= Jacob Van Buskirk =

Canadian politician (c.1760–1834)

Jacob Van Buskirk (c. 1760 – November 27, 1834) was a merchant, judge and political figure in Nova Scotia. He represented Shelburne County in the Nova Scotia House of Assembly from 1805 to 1818.

He was born in Bergen County, New Jersey, the son of Abraham Van Buskirk and Sophia Van Dam. He was a lieutenant in the loyalist New Jersey Volunteers during the American Revolution. He was captured on Staten Island in 1777 by General Philemon Dickinson but then released and rejoined his regiment. In 1781, he was wounded at Eutaw Springs.

After the war, Van Buskirk settled in the Shelburne, Nova Scotia region in 1783. In 1790, he married Sarah Breen. He originally planned on farming but some time later established himself as a merchant at Shelburne. Van Buskirk was named a justice of the peace in 1802 and a judge in the Inferior Court of Common Pleas in 1810. He also later served as provincial collector for impost and excise duties. Van Buskirk joined the local militia as major, later becoming lieutenant-colonel. After his wife's death in 1832, he moved to Yarmouth to live with his son-in-law John Bingay; he died there two years later.
