= John Warwick (Nova Scotia politician) =

Canadian politician

John Warwick (1746–24 June 1828) was an English-born farmer and political figure in Nova Scotia. He represented Digby Township from 1806 to 1820 in the Nova Scotia House of Assembly.

He was born in Yorkshire and came to Virginia in 1774. Warwick took up arms in the loyalist cause and came to Digby, Nova Scotia at the end of the American Revolution. In 1800, he was named deputy postmaster.
