= Phineas Lovett =

Canadian politician

Phineas Lovett (May 15, 1745 – June 17, 1828) was a farmer, merchant, judge and political figure in Nova Scotia. He represented Annapolis Township from 1775 to 1783 and from 1799 to 1806 and Annapolis County from 1808 to 1811 in the Nova Scotia House of Assembly.

He was born in Massachusetts, the son of Phineas Lovett Sr. and Beulah Morse, and came to Nova Scotia with his family during the 1760s. He married Abigail Thayer in 1768. Lovett settled in Annapolis County. He owned a ship which traded in the West Indies. Lovett was high sheriff for the county, justice of the peace and lieutenant-colonel in the militia. While his father became a patriot, Lovett Jr. defended the town during the American Revolution, particularly in the Raid on Annapolis Royal (1781). In 1783, his seat in the provincial assembly was declared vacant due to non-attendance. He was elected to the provincial assembly for Annapolis County a second time in 1808 following the death of Henry Rutherford. In 1810, he was named a justice in the Inferior Court of Common Pleas. He died at Annapolis Royal at the age of 83.

His son James Russell Lovett also served in the assembly.
