= Laurence Kavanagh =

Canadian politician

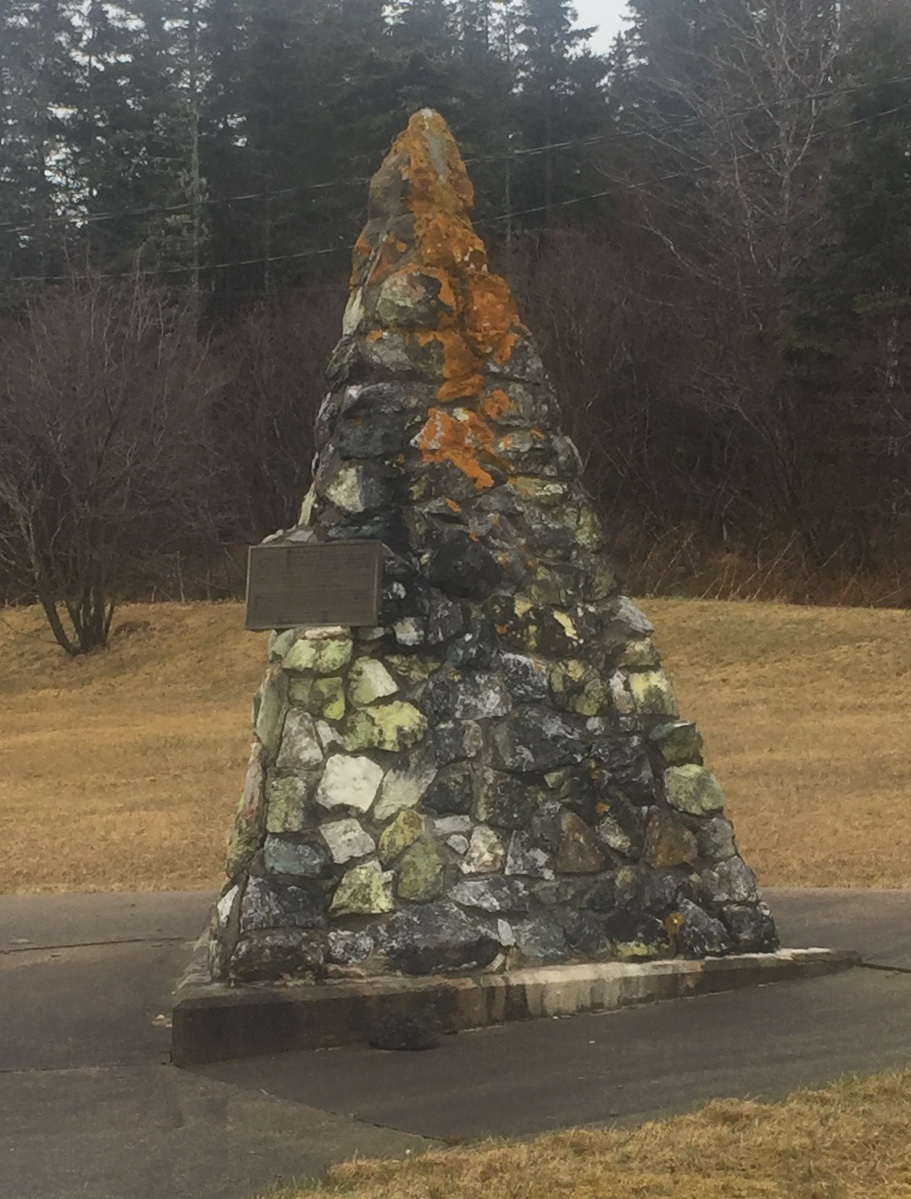
Monument marking location of Laurence Kavanagh's home, St. Peter's, Nova Scotia

Laurence Kavanagh (1764 – August 20, 1830) was a merchant, judge and political figure in Nova Scotia. He represented Cape Breton County in the Nova Scotia House of Assembly from 1820 to 1830. His first name also appears as Lawrence and his surname as Cavanagh in some sources. He is the father of Laurence Kavanagh Jr.

He was born on Cape Breton Island, probably at Louisbourg, the son of Laurence Kavanagh, an immigrant from Ireland, and Margaret Farrell. The family moved to St. Peter's in 1777, three years after his father's death at sea. With his brother James, who relocated to Halifax, Laurence took over the operation of his father's business, becoming one of the major suppliers for settlers in the region. In 1789, he married Felicité LeJeune.

Kavanagh in 1823 broke 100+ years of precedent when, as the first representative of Cape Breton Island in the Nova Scotia House of Assembly, he became the first English speaking Roman Catholic to serve in a legislature. His election had to be approved by the Colonial Office and confirmed by a vote of the assembly. Other Roman Catholics were then granted the right to serve in the assembly. He also served as a major in the militia, justice of the peace and as a member of the Inferior Court of Common Pleas for Cape Breton. Kavanagh died in office at St. Peter's, Nova Scotia in 1830.

== See also ==
- Politics of Nova Scotia
