= John Wells (Nova Scotia politician) =

Canadian politician

John Wells (born September 28, 1772) was a merchant and political figure in Nova Scotia. He represented King's County from 1806 to 1818 and the Cornwallis Township from 1820 to 1826 in the Nova Scotia House of Assembly.

He was the son of Judah Wells and Eleanor Simpson. Wells married Prudence Eaton in 1793. Wells was also a justice of the peace.
