= Samuel Marshall (Canadian politician) =

Canadian politician (1757–1813)

Samuel Poole

MLA for Yarmouth township
- In office 1811–1813

Personal details
- Born: 1757 England
- Died: April 1, 1813 (aged 55–56) Yarmouth, Nova Scotia
- Spouse: Sarah Sheldon
- Occupation: Merchant, shipbuilder

Samuel Marshall (1757 - April 1, 1813) was a merchant, shipbuilder and political figure in Nova Scotia. He represented Yarmouth Township in the Nova Scotia House of Assembly from 1811 to 1813.

Marshall came to Nova Scotia from New York state in 1787, settling in Yarmouth. In 1794, he was named a justice of the peace. Around 1810, he was considered to be the leading shipbuilder and merchant in Yarmouth. Marshall died in office at Yarmouth.

His daughter Catherine married Samuel Campbell.
