= Thomas Dickson (Nova Scotia politician) =

Canadian politician

Thomas Dickson (July 8, 1791 – February 13, 1855) was a lawyer and political figure. He represented Sydney County from 1818 to 1836, Pictou County from 1838 to 1840 and Colchester County from 1841 to 1843 in the Nova Scotia House of Assembly.

Dickson was born in Onslow, Nova Scotia, the son of Charles Dickson and Amelia Bishop, migrants from Connecticut. He studied law with Samuel George William Archibald, his brother-in-law, and set up practice in Pictou in 1816. In 1818, Dickson married Sarah Ann Patterson. He was named registrar of probate in 1842. He also served as collector of impost and excise for Pictou district. He died in Pictou at the age of 63.
