= Samuel George William Archibald =

Canadian politician (1777–1846)

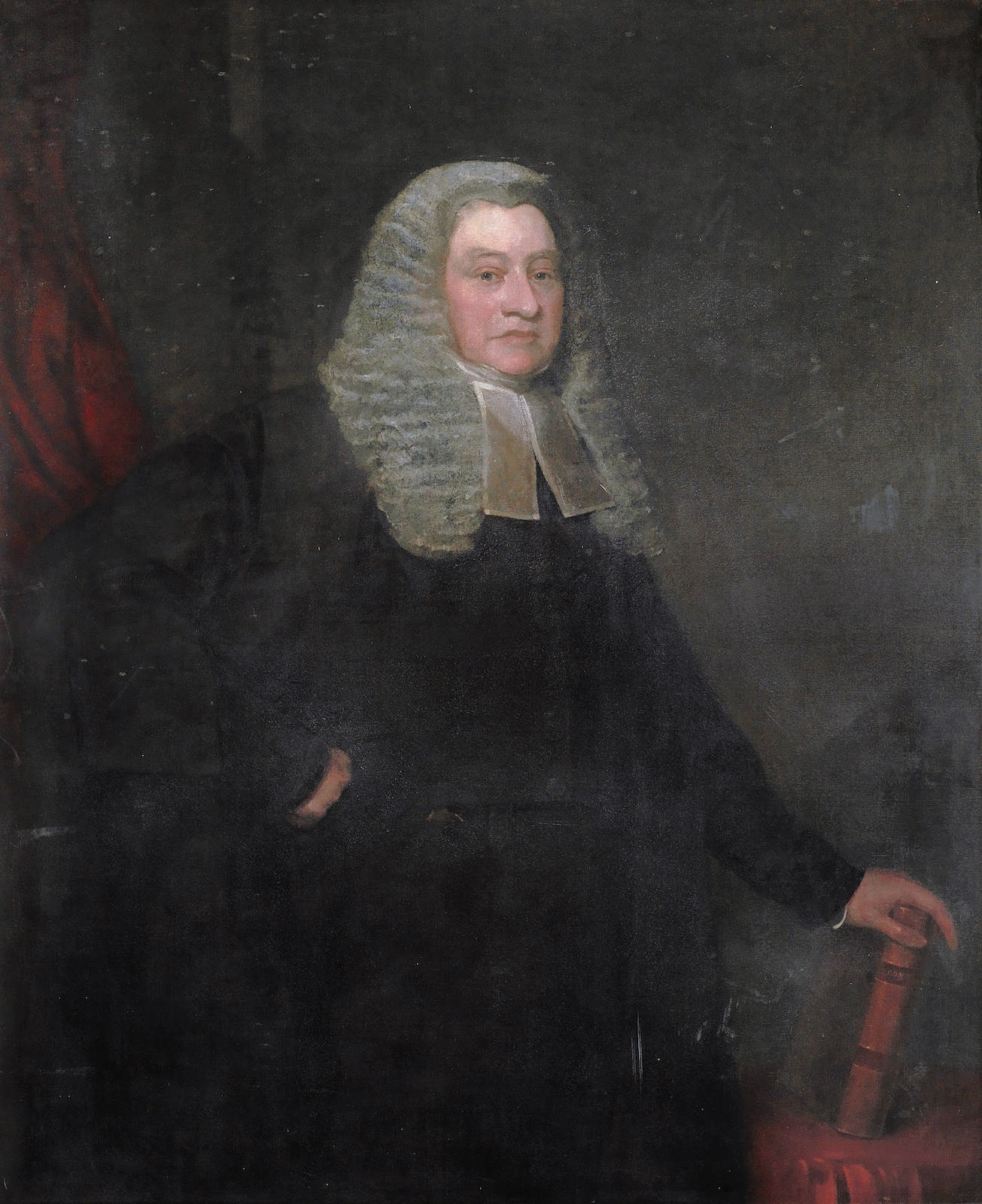
- Born: February 5, 1777
- Died: January 28, 1846 (aged 68)
- Children: Edward Mortimer Archibald

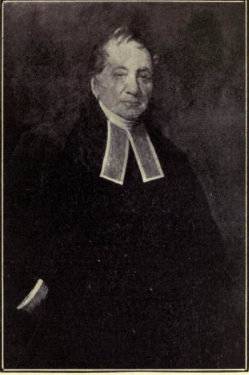
Samuel George William Archibald, Halifax, Nova Scotia

Samuel George William Archibald QC (February 5, 1777 – January 28, 1846) was a Canadian politician, judge, and lawyer in Nova Scotia. He represented Halifax County from 1806 to 1836 and Colchester County from 1836 to 1841 in the Nova Scotia House of Assembly. He supported the Royal Acadian School.

He was born Samuel George Washington Archibald in Truro, Nova Scotia, the son of Samuel Archibald and Rachel Todd. His grandfather David Archibald, an immigrant from Ulster, was one of the founders of Truro, and raised the boy after the death of his father in 1780. At the age of 15, he went to Massachusetts for further education, returning four years later. After his return, he studied law with Simon Bradstreet Robie. In 1802, he married Elizabeth Dickson, daughter of Charles Dickson and Amelia Bishop, the sister of Robert, William, Thomas Dickson. Later that year, he became probate judge for Colchester and Pictou districts. In 1805, Archibald was admitted to practice as an attorney and barrister. Archibald was named King's Counsel in 1817. In 1818, he was surrogate general for the colony's vice admiralty court.

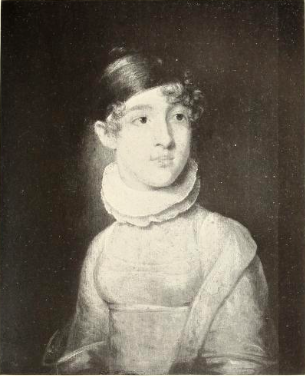
Joanna Archibald by Robert Field

In 1819, he unsuccessfully prosecuted Richard John Uniacke, Jr. who took part in the last fatal duel in Nova Scotia, which led to the death of merchant William Bowie. Archibald set up an oat mill in Truro in 1822. Archibald also served as Chief Justice of Prince Edward Island from 1824 to 1828, although he never resided on the island. He was speaker for the legislative assembly from 1824 to 1841. In 1826, he was named solicitor general for Nova Scotia. In 1830, Archibald was named acting attorney general after the death of Richard John Uniacke. He married Joanna Brinley in 1832, two years after the death of his first wife. He suffered a stroke in 1836 which left him for a time with paralysis of his facial muscles and difficulty speaking. In 1841, he was named master of the rolls and resigned his seat in the assembly. Archibald died in Halifax in 1846 of a severe stroke.

His son Charles Dickson also served in the legislative assembly and his son Edward Mortimer became a lawyer and office-holder in Newfoundland.

Nova Scotian artist William Valentine painted Archibald's portrait.
