= Edward Mortimer (businessman) =

Canadian politician

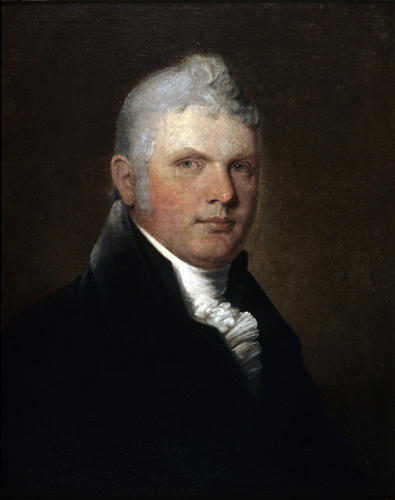
Edward Mortimer, c 1815 by Robert Field. Art Gallery of Nova Scotia.

Edward Mortimer (1768 – October 10, 1819) was a Scottish-born businessman, judge and political figure in Nova Scotia. He represented Halifax County in the Nova Scotia House of Assembly from 1799 to 1820.

He was born in Keith, the son of Alexander Mortimer and Mary Smith, and came to Nova Scotia in the late 1780s as an employee of a firm from Glasgow. He purchased land at Pictou and became involved in the trade in fish and timber. Mortimer married Sarah Patterson around 1790. In 1813, he established his own company. Mortimer also operated coal mines at Pictou. Mortimer served in the local militia, was a trustee for the Pictou grammar school and was named a justice in the Court of General Sessions and the Inferior Court of Common Pleas for Pictou district. He died at Pictou at the age of 51.
