= William Allen Chipman =

Canadian politician

William Allen Chipman (November 8, 1757 – December 28, 1845) was a merchant, land owner, judge, and political figure in Nova Scotia. He represented King's County from 1799 to 1806, from 1818 to 1826 and from 1828 to 1830, Sydney County from 1807 to 1808 and Cornwallis Township from 1811 to 1818 in the Nova Scotia House of Assembly

He was born in Newport, Rhode Island, the son of Handley Chipman and Jean Allen, and came to Cornwallis Township with his parents in 1761. Chipman served as clerk for the township and customs collector for King's County. He was also justice of the peace and judge of the Inferior Court of Common Pleas from 1821 to 1841. In 1777, he married Ann Osborn. Chipman voted against the measure (which passed) to allow Laurence Kavanagh to sit in the assembly without taking the required oath against transubstantiation. He was a prominent member of the local freemasons and helped establish the Baptist church in Nova Scotia. As a member of the Nova Scotia Baptist Education Society, he helped establish Horton Academy and Queen's College (later Acadia University). He died in Cornwallis.

His son Samuel also served in the House of Assembly.
