= Edward James (judge) =

Canadian politician

Edward James (1757 – 16 July 1841) was an English-born judge and political figure in Nova Scotia. He represented Lunenburg County from 1793 to 1799, from 1806 to 1811 and from 1817 to 1818 and Lunenburg Township from 1818 to 1826.

He was born in Southampton and came to New York state. He served as an officer in the King's Orange Raiders during the American Revolution. James went to Nova Scotia in 1780. James was sheriff for Lunenburg from 1797 to 1798. He also served as a justice of the peace. From 1823 to 1841, James was custos rotulorum and a justice in the Inferior Court of Common Pleas for Lunenburg County. He died in Lunenburg at the age of 84.

His grandson, also named Edward James, later served in the provincial assembly.
