= Samuel Sheldon Poole =

Canadian politician (1751–1835)

Samuel Poole

MLA for Yarmouth township
- In office 1785–1799

MLA for Yarmouth township
- In office 1806–1811

MLA for Yarmouth township
- In office 1814–1835

Personal details
- Born: March 25, 1751 Reading, Massachusetts
- Died: October 7, 1835 (aged 84)
- Spouse: Elizabeth Barnes
- Occupation: Judge

Samuel Sheldon Poole (March 25, 1751 – October 7, 1835) was a judge and politician in Nova Scotia. He represented Yarmouth Township in the Nova Scotia House of Assembly from 1785 to 1799, from 1806 to 1811 and from 1814 to 1835.

Samuel Sheldon Poole was born in Reading, Massachusetts, the son of Jonathan Poole and Mary Sheldon. He was educated at Harvard University and Yarmouth. In 1775 he married Elizabeth Barnes. In 1785, he was named a Justice of the Peace for Queen's County. Poole later was named a justice in the Inferior Court of Common Pleas for Shelburne County and a judge in the probate court. He also served as custos rotulorum and was the first teacher for the Yarmouth Grammar School, established in 1811. After the death of Samuel Marshall, Poole was elected again to the provincial assembly in an 1814 by-election. In 1826, he was referred to as the "father of the house" by Governor James Kempt. He appealed his loss to Reuben Clements in the 1830 general election and regained his seat in the assembly the following year. Poole died in office at the age of 84.
