= Henry Purdy (politician) =

Canadian politician

Member of the Nova Scotia House of Assembly
- In office 1806–1820
- Constituency: Cumberland County

Personal details
- Born: c. 1744
- Died: July 20, 1827 Fort Lawrence, Nova Scotia
- Spouse: Tamar Kniffen (m. 1773)
- Parent(s): Samuel Purdy and Winnifred Griffin
- Occupation: Landowner, judge, militia officer, politician

Military service
- Unit: Westchester Loyalists
- Rank: Captain

Henry Purdy (ca 1744 – July 20, 1827) was a landowner, judge and political figure in Nova Scotia. He represented Cumberland County in the Nova Scotia House of Assembly from 1806 to 1820.

He was the son of Samuel Purdy and Winnifred Griffin. In 1773, he married Tamar Kniffen. Purdy was captain of the Westchester Loyalists, in which his brother Gabriel Purdy also served as a sergeant under Henry's command. Henry Purdy settled in Fort Lawrence, Nova Scotia in 1783. He served as lieutenant-colonel in the local militia and judge in the Inferior Court of Common Pleas. Purdy was named high sheriff for Cumberland County in 1794.
