= William Lawson (banker) =

Nova Scotian banker and politician

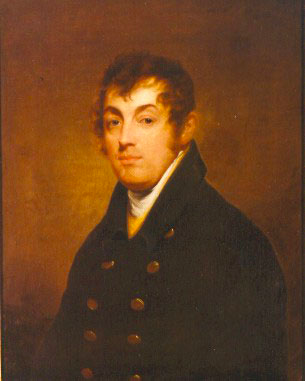
- Painting of William Lawson by Robert Field
- Born: 1772; Nova Scotia
- Died: August 25, 1848 (aged 76)
- Occupations: Banker, businessman and politician
- Known for: The founding director and first president of the Bank of Nova Scotia
- Spouse: Elizabeth Handyside (m. 1793)
- Children: 14

William Lawson (1772 – 25 August 1848) was a Nova Scotian businessman, office holder, justice of the peace, and politician. He was born in Halifax, Nova Scotia, and baptised on the 14th of March 1772. He was the son of John Lawson and Sarah Shatford (who are both buried in the Old Burying Ground).

== Business and public career ==
He was a founding director and first president of the Bank of Nova Scotia, now known as Scotiabank. The bank was incorporated by the Nova Scotia Legislative Assembly on Mar 30, 1831 in Halifax, Nova Scotia with William Lawson (banker) (1772–1848) serving as the first president.

As a member of the Nova Scotia House of Assembly, he introduced a bill chartering a public bank. The bill ensured that any bank directors were responsible for double the amount of their holdings in case of insolvency. This clause was an innovation in British North America, and came at a time when most banks limited liability to the value of a shareholder's stock. As a means of building trust and ensuring the savings of depositors, the concept provided stability to the fledgling bank which prospered and spread quickly from its inception in the Merchants' Coffee House, Halifax to become an international financial institution. Besides his mercantile and shipping ventures he served as an elected member of the Nova Scotia Legislative Assembly representing Halifax County from 1806 to 1836, and was appointed to the Legislative Council on 25 January 1838, serving to 1845.

== Private life ==
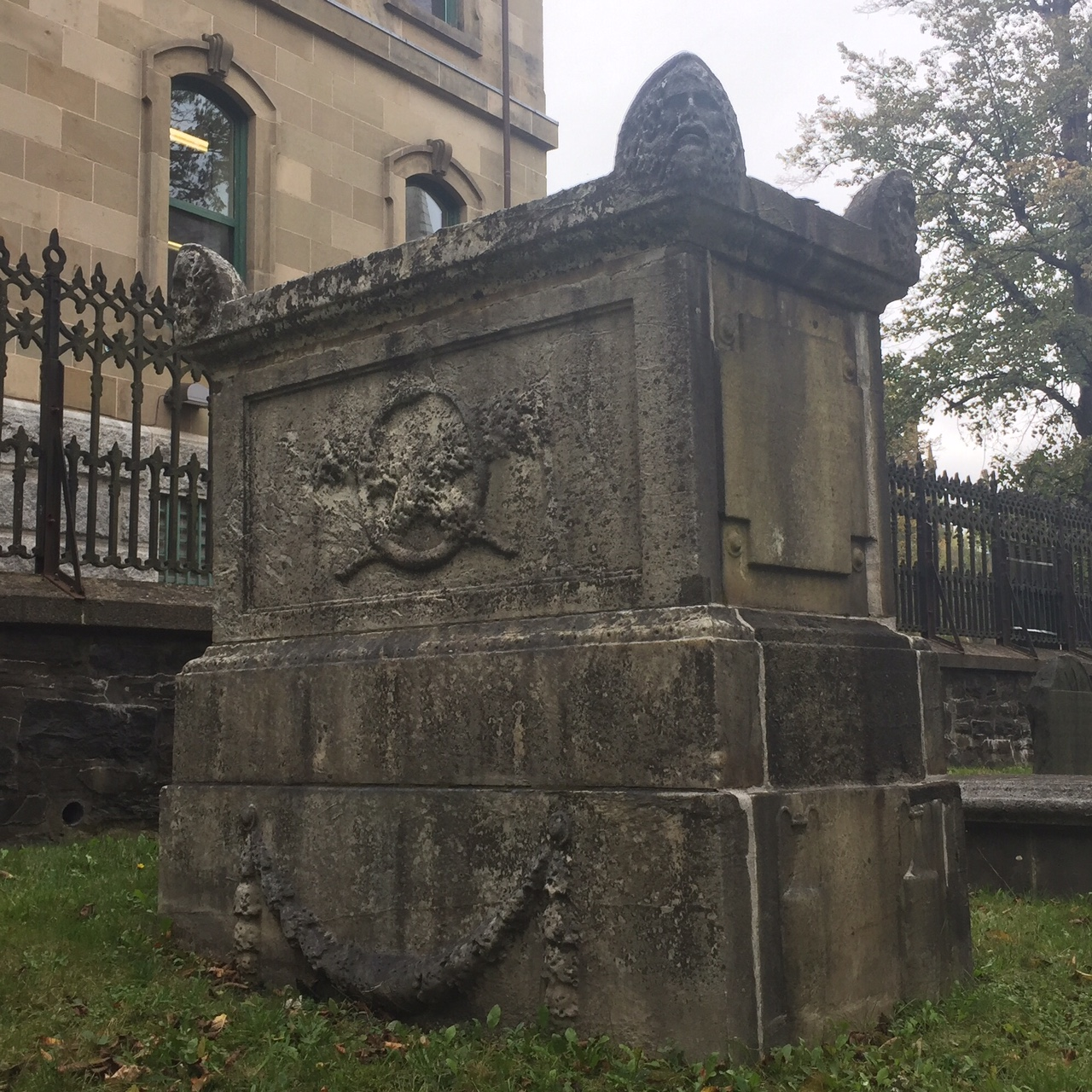
Grave of William Lawson's father and family, Old Burying Ground (Halifax, Nova Scotia)

On 26 December 1793, he married Elizabeth Handyside who was the daughter of his stepmother from a previous marriage. Although technically brother and sister, the couple were not biological relatives. William and Elizabeth had fourteen children and resided in a house at the corner of Hollis and Salter streets, built by Malachy Salter, about 1760. The house was sold by Lawson's heirs in 1856 to John Esson, and the land now comprises part of the site of Maritime Centre, in downtown Halifax.

A granddaughter, Jessie Jane Lawson (1838–1901), born to his son William Lawson Jr., married the Rev. George Monro Grant, Principal of Queen's University. Among their descendants are a number of Canadian educators including their son William Lawson Grant, grandson George Parkin Grant, and great-grandson Michael Ignatieff.

Business positions
Preceded by None	President of the Bank of Nova Scotia; 1832–1837	Succeeded by Mather Byles Almon
