= Shubael Dimock =

Nova Scotian politician (1753–1834)

Shubael Dimock (c. 1753 – July 14, 1834) was a political figure in Nova Scotia. He represented Newport Township in the Nova Scotia House of Assembly from 1793 to 1799 and from 1826 to 1830; later, he represented Hants County from 1799 to 1820.

Dimock was born in Mansfield, Connecticut, the son of Shubael Dimock and Eunice Marsh. Dimock moved to Nova Scotia with his father in 1759, where the elder Dimock moved to escape religious persecution because of his involvement in the Separate Baptists. Like his father, Dimock also became a preacher; he also served as a magistrate.

Dimock was married twice. His first marriage, to Susan Macumber, produced six children. Shubael and Susan's fourth child, Ichabod, also served as a member of the provincial assembly. Dimock's second marriage, to Grace Irish, resulted in one son.

Dimock died in Newport at the age of 81.
