= Snow Parker =

Canadian politician

Snow Parker (May 16, 1760 – September 18, 1843) was a merchant, judge and political figure in Nova Scotia. He represented Queen's County in the Nova Scotia House of Assembly from 1801 to 1826.

He was born in Yarmouth, Massachusetts, the son of Benjamin Parker and Mary Snow, and came to Liverpool, Nova Scotia with his family. He entered business as a coastal trader and also transported goods for other merchants. With his brother Benjamin, he entered the trade in salmon and mackerel caught off Newfoundland. Parker was also involved in shipbuilding and trade with the West Indies. In 1780, he married Martha Knowles. He was named a captain in the Queens County militia in 1797 and also served several terms as justice of the peace. Parker also provided ships and financing for privateers based in Liverpool and, for a time, was the richest man in the town. In 1810, he became a judge in the Inferior Court of Common Pleas for the county. He died in Liverpool in 1843.
