= Jonathan Crane (politician) =

Canadian politician

Jonathan Crane (1750 – August 1820) was a militia leader and political figure in Nova Scotia. He fought in the Battle off Cape Split in the American Revolution. He represented Kings County from 1784 to 1793 and 1799 to 1818, and Horton Township from 1818 to 1820 in the Nova Scotia House of Assembly.

He was born in Lebanon, Connecticut, the son of Silas Crane, and moved to Horton (later Wolfville), Nova Scotia, with his family in 1761. In 1771, Crane married Rebecca Allison there. He was named a justice of the peace in 1783 and a judge in the inferior Court of Common Pleas for King's County in 1815. He also served as colonel in the local militia. Crane was elected to represent Cornwallis in 1820 but died at Grand-Pré before the first session.

His son William later served in the New Brunswick House of Assembly. His daughter Nancy married Sherman Denison.
