= Thomas Ritchie (judge) =

Canadian politician (1777–1852)

Personal details
- Born: September 21, 1777 Annapolis Royal, Nova Scotia
- Died: November 13, 1852 (aged 75) Annapolis Royal
- Children: John William Ritchie, William Johnstone Ritchie
- Parent: John Ritchie (father)
- Occupation: politician, judge

Thomas Ritchie (September 21, 1777 – November 13, 1852) was a lawyer, judge and political figure in Nova Scotia. He represented Annapolis County in the Nova Scotia House of Assembly from 1806 to 1824.

He was born in Annapolis Royal, Nova Scotia, the son of John Ritchie and Alicia Maria Le Cain. He studied law with Thomas Henry Barclay and took over Barclay's practice in 1799. Ritchie married Elizabeth Wildman Johnston, who was the daughter of Elizabeth Lichtenstein, in 1807. In 1823, he married Elizabeth Best after his first wife died in a bedroom fire. In 1824, he resigned his seat in the provincial assembly after he was named judge in the Inferior Court of Common Pleas for the western division. In 1831, he was named president of the Court of General Sessions for the western district. He served on the bench until 1841. He also was president of the board of health and lieutenant-colonel in the militia. Ritchie married Anne Bond, the daughter of Joseph Norman Bond, in 1831 after his second wife died, having been thrown from a horse. He died at Annapolis Royal at the age of 75.

His son John William Ritchie served in the province's Legislative Council and in the Supreme Court of Nova Scotia and is considered one of the Fathers of Confederation. His son William Johnstone Ritchie served as Chief Justice of Canada.
