= Thomas Roach (Canadian politician) =

Thomas Roach (1769–1833) was an Irish-born merchant, farmer and politician in Nova Scotia. He represented Cumberland County in the Nova Scotia House of Assembly from 1799 to 1826.

He was born in Cork, was originally educated there for the priesthood and came to Nova Scotia with his father around 1790, settling at Fort Lawrence. He was a prominent member of the Methodist Church in that area; his house was used as a church. Roach was married four times: to Ruth Dixon in 1793, the widow Sarah Allen, Mary Dixon and Charlotte Wells.
