= Simon Bradstreet Robie =

Canadian politician (1770–1858)

Simon Bradstreet Robie (1770 – January 3, 1858) was a lawyer, judge and political figure in Nova Scotia. He represented Truro Township from 1799 to 1806 and Halifax County from 1806 to 1826 in the Nova Scotia House of Assembly.

Born in Marblehead, Massachusetts, he was the son of Loyalists Thomas Robie and Mary Bradstreet, and went to Halifax with his parents at the beginning of the American Revolution. He studied law with Jonathan Sterns and was called to the Nova Scotia bar in the early 1790s. In 1806, he married Elizabeth Creighton. He was named Solicitor General in 1815. He served as Speaker for the House of Assembly from 1817 to 1824. In 1824, he was named to Nova Scotia's Council. Robie, as a member of the Council, supported the creation of the Pictou Academy. In 1826, he was named master of the rolls, who presided over the Court of Chancery, serving until 1834. In 1838, when the Council's functions were separated, he became a member of the Executive Council and president of the Legislative Council. He resigned from the Executive Council in January 1848 and the Legislative Council later the same year. Robie died in Halifax in 1858.

The home where Robie was born still stands at 1 Mechanic St, Marblehead, MA.

Robie Street in Halifax was named after him. There are also streets named after him in Truro and Amherst, Nova Scotia.

== See also ==
- Robie Street
