= Onslow, Nova Scotia =

Community in Nova Scotia, Canada

Coordinates: 45°23′15.1″N 63°18′16.5″W

Onslow in Nova Scotia

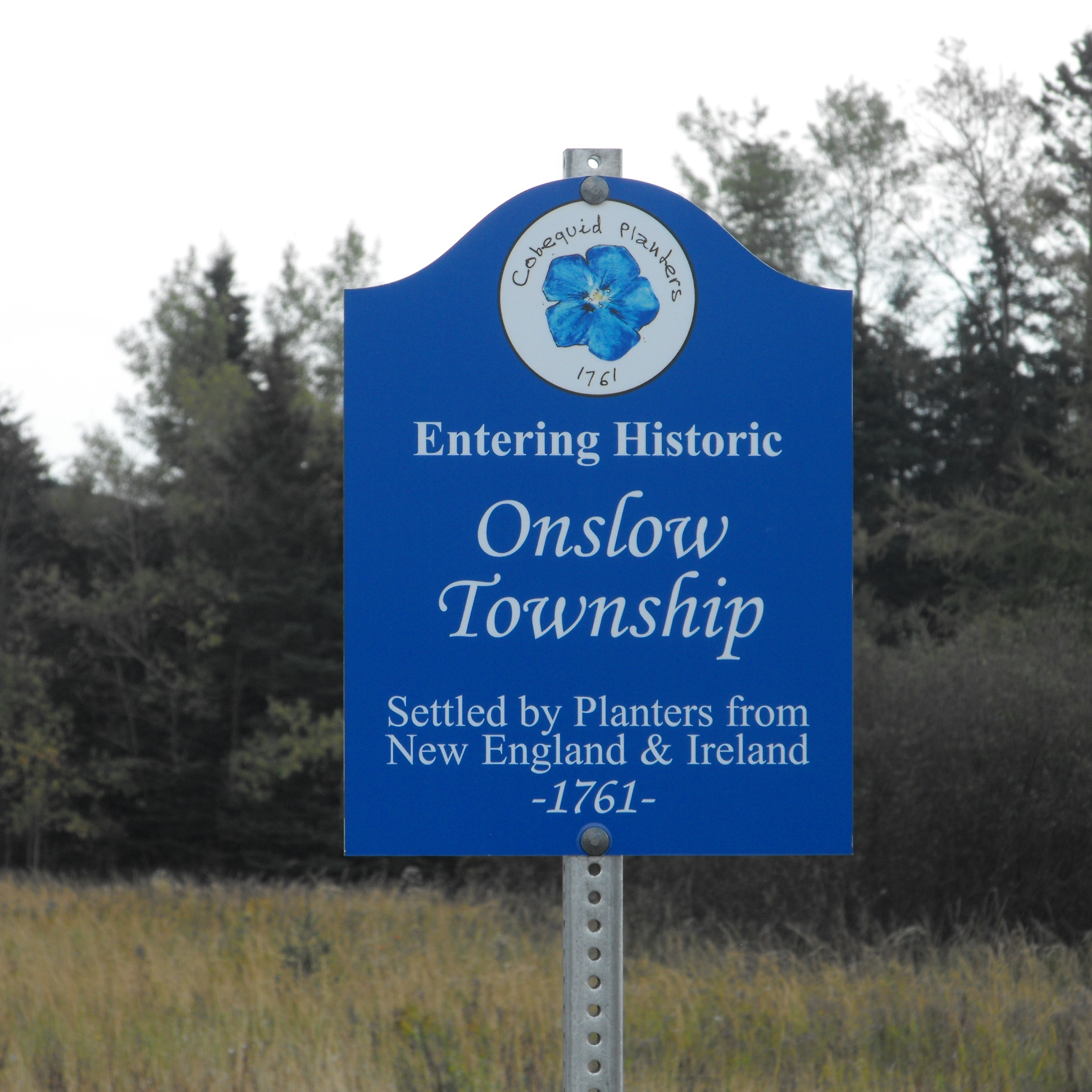
Onslow Township marker

Onslow is an unincorporated community in the Canadian province of Nova Scotia, located in central Colchester County. The community is located along the north bank of the Salmon River, opposite the town of Truro and is largely a farming area. The Onslow Township used to include the community of North River, Nova Scotia. The area was first settled by Acadians and resettled after their expulsion as Onslow Township in 1761 by Irish emigrants under Colonel McNutt. The township is believed to have been named after Arthur Onslow.

An important highway interchange is located in the community, where Highway 102 terminates at Highway 104.

Onslow is home to Central Colchester Junior High School, operated by the Chignecto-Central Regional School Board. Onslow also contains a John Deere dealership and a volunteer fire department; the corner store has closed. In the fall and spring, migrating Canada geese are attracted to the farmlands. Onslow is geographically situated in an area with high winds, making it an excellent location for wind turbines. Some farmers in the area have chosen to erect wind turbines to power their farm(s).

Nova Scotia Power has a power distribution point in Onslow where it interconnects the Halifax Regional Municipality with Cape Breton, South Shore and New Brunswick Power Transmission System.

== See also ==
- Onslow Speedway
