= Goudge =

Goudge is a surname. Notable people with the surname include:

- Chris Goudge (1935–2010), British hurdler
- Eileen Goudge (born 1950), American author
- Elizabeth Goudge (1900–1984), English writer
- Henry Goudge (1805–1841), Canadian merchant and politician
- Monson Henry Goudge (1829–1919), Canadian merchant and politician
- Stephen T. Goudge, Canadian judge
- T. A. Goudge (1910–1999), Canadian philosopher and academic
- William Goudge (1877–1967), English Royal Navy chaplain and cricketer
