= Judson Burpee Black =

Canadian physician and politician

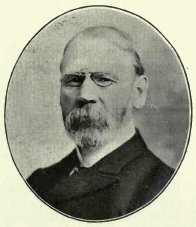

Member of the Canadian Parliament for Hants
- In office 1904–1911
- Preceded by: Benjamin Russell
- Succeeded by: Hadley Brown Tremain

Personal details
- Born: August 15, 1842 St. Martins, New Brunswick
- Died: December 9, 1924 (aged 82)
- Party: Liberal
- Spouse: Bessie - Daughter of the Honorable Ezra Churchill, Senator
- Occupation: physician

Judson Burpee Black (August 15, 1842 – December 9, 1924) was a Canadian physician and politician.

== Biography ==
Born in St. Martins, New Brunswick, the son of Thomas Henry Black and Mary E. Fownes, Black was educated at the public schools of St. Martins and Saint John, New Brunswick, Mount Allison Academy, Mount Allison University and Dartmouth Medical College. A physician, he was mayor of Windsor, Nova Scotia, from 1884 to 1885 and from 1901 to 1903. He was president of the Windsor Board of Trade in 1900 and 1901. He was president for Nova Scotia of the Canadian Medical Association in 1904–05.

He was first elected to the House of Commons of Canada for the Nova Scotia electoral district of Hants at the general elections of 1904. A Liberal, he was re-elected in 1908 and 1911.

== Electoral record ==
1904 Canadian federal election: Hants
Party	Candidate	Votes
Liberal	J.B. Black	2,033
Conservative	Frederick W. Hanright	1,957

1908 Canadian federal election: Hants
Party	Candidate	Votes
Liberal	Judson Burpee Black	2,141
Conservative	Frederick W. Hanright	2,008

1911 Canadian federal election: Hants
Party	Candidate	Votes
Conservative	Hadley Brown Tremain	2,191
Liberal	Judson Burpee Black	2,105
