= List of shipwrecks in September 1877 =

The list of shipwrecks in September 1877 includes ships sunk, foundered, grounded, or otherwise lost during September 1877.

== 1 September ==
List of shipwrecks: 1 September 1877
Ship	State	Description
Fede-e-Speranza	Italy	The ship ran aground on the Corkbeg Bank, in the Irish Sea off the coast of County Cork, United Kingdom. She was refloated with the assistance of a tug and resumed her voyage.
Lodka	Russia	The ship sprang a leak and foundered. She was being towed from Saint Petersburg to Kronstadt.

== 3 September ==
List of shipwrecks: 3 September 1877
Ship	State	Description
Anafesto	Italy	The brig collided with the steamship Zero (United Kingdom) and sank off Bari. Her crew were rescued by Zero.
Belle	United Kingdom	The ship was driven ashore and wrecked in Geographe Bay.
Fame	United Kingdom	The ketch foundered 12 nautical miles (22 km) north east of Padstow, Cornwall. Her rew were rescued by the ketch Victoria (United Kingdom). Fame was on a voyage from Newport, Monmouthshire to Boscastle, Cornwall.
Les Trois Frères	France	The lugger collided with the brig Litton (Norway) off the Wolf Rock, Cornwall and was severely damaged. One of the five people on board got aboard the brig. Les Trois Frères was towed in to Penzance, Cornwall by the steamship Lord of the Isles (United Kingdom).
T. Barry	United Kingdom	The steamship ran aground at Villareal, Spain. She was on a voyage from Liverpool, Lancashire to Villareal. She was refloated and taken in to Villareal.
Thomas and James	United Kingdom	The fishing coble struck the pier and sank at Whitby, Yorkshire.
Water Lily	United Kingdom	The fishing coble was driven into by the fishing coble Garland (United Kingdom) and sank at Whitby. Her crew were rescued by Garland.

== 4 September ==
List of shipwrecks: 4 September 1877
Ship	State	Description
Louise	Germany	The ship struck rocks at South Queensferry, Lothian, United Kingdom. She was on a voyage from Bo'ness, Lothian to Riga, Russia. She was refloated and taken in to Leith, Lothian in a leaky condition and was beached there.
Mary Ann Hudson	New Zealand	The 15-ton ketch stranded on the bar of the Mohaka River, and became a total wreck.
Oxford	United Kingdom	The ship ran aground in the Humber. She was on a voyage from Kotka, Russia to Hull, Yorkshire.
Peter Anker	Norway	The schooner was driven ashore at Westgate-on-Sea, Kent, United Kingdom. Her crew were rescued by the Margate Lifeboat. Peter Anker was on a voyage from Christiania to Faversham, Kent. She was later refloated and taken in to Margate, Kent.
St. Joseph	United Kingdom	The brig was abandoned at sea. Her crew were rescued. She was on a voyage from Demerara, British Guiana to New York, United States.

== 5 September ==
List of shipwrecks: 5 September 1877
Ship	State	Description
Joseph and Ann	United Kingdom	The smack was run down by the steamship Charles Batters (United Kingdom) and sank off the Cromer Knowl, in the North Sea off the coast of Norfolk with the loss of three of her six crew.

== 6 September ==
List of shipwrecks: 6 September 1877
Ship	State	Description
Kepler	United Kingdom	The steamship was wrecked south of Lemvig, Denmark. Her crew were rescued. She was on a voyage from London to Kronstadt.
Lufra	United Kingdom	The steamship was driven ashore on Seskar, Grand Duchy of Finland. She was on a voyage from West Hartlepool, County Durham to Kronstadt, Russia.
Maria	Germany	The ship was wrecked on the Buchsand. Her crew were rescued. She was on a voyage from "Faxoe", Denmark to Itzhoe.
New Era	United Kingdom	The barque was wrecked at Løkken, Denmark. She was on a voyage from London to Kronstadt.

== 7 September ==
List of shipwrecks: 7 September 1877
Ship	State	Description
Ethel	United Kingdom	The steamship ran aground at IJmuiden, North Holland, Netherlands. She was on a voyage from Kronstadt, Russia to Amsterdam, North Holland. She was refloated with the assistance of tugs.

== 8 September ==
List of shipwrecks: 8 September 1877
Ship	State	Description
Alpha	United Kingdom	The barge capsized off Dungeness, Kent. Her crew were rescued. She was on a voyage from Poole, Dorset to Whitby, Yorkshire. Alpha was towed in to Dover, Kent in a waterlogged condition by the tug Universe (United Kingdom) on 10 September. She was driven into the Admiralty Pier the next day and sank.
Athalaska	United Kingdom	The brigantine was driven ashore in Sutton Harbour, Devon.
Catherine	United Kingdom	The ship was driven ashore at Scoughall, Lothian. She was on a voyage from London to Leith, Lothian. She was refloated and resumed her voyage.
Elizabeth	United Kingdom	The schooner was driven ashore in Sutton Harbour.
Emma	United Kingdom	The barge collided with Ryde Pier, Isle of Wight and was scuttled.
H. M. McKenzie	United Kingdom	The ship was wrecked in the Pentland Skerries. Her crew were rescued. She was on a voyage from Stornoway, Isle of Lewis to Saint Petersburg, Russia.
Loch Nell	United Kingdom	The steamship ran aground at Wexford. She was on a voyage from Dublin to Wexford.
Padres Minde	Norway	The brig ran aground at Hayle, Cornwall, United Kingdom. She was on a voyage from Fredrikstadt to Hayle.
Southella	United Kingdom	The steamship ran aground at Kronstadt, Russia. She was on a voyage from Swinemünde, Germany to Kronstadt.

== 9 September ==
List of shipwrecks: 9 September 1877
Ship	State	Description
Emily Augusta	United Kingdom	The ship was abandoned at in the Atlantic Ocean. Her 26 crew were rescued by a German vessel. She was on a voyage from Saint John, New Brunswick, Canada to Liverpool, Lancashire.
Octavia	United Kingdom	The schooner put in to Queenstown, County Cork in a sinking condition and was beached. She was on a voyage from Plymouth, Devon to Chester, Cheshire.
T. Barry	United Kingdom	The steamship ran aground at Villareal, Spain. She was on a voyage from Villareal to Liverpool, Lancashire. She was refloated and resumed her voyage.

== 10 September ==
List of shipwrecks: 10 September 1877
Ship	State	Description
Alpha	United Kingdom	The barque sank at Dover, Kent.
Barletta	United Kingdom	The ship was driven ashore at Maracaibo, Venezuela.
Donna Estanislada	Germany	The brig was wrecked at Bolderāja, Russia. Her crew were rescued. She was on a voyage from Liverpool, Lancashire, United Kingdom to Riga, Russia.
East Goodwin Lightship	Trinity House	The lightship was run into by an Austrian barque and was severely damaged.

== 11 September ==
List of shipwrecks: 11 September 1877
Ship	State	Description
Avalanche, and Forest Queen	United Kingdom; Canada	The clipper Avalanche collided with Forest Queen in the English Channel 12 nautical miles (22 km) off the Isle of Portland, Dorset. Avalanche was on a voyage from London to Wellington, New Zealand. She sank with the loss of 94 of the 97 people on board. Survivors were initially rescued by Forest Queen, which was on a voyage from London to Sandy Hook, New Jersey, United States. She sank with the loss of six of her fifteen crew. The twelve survivors from the two vessels were rescued by Portland lerretts.
Iceland	United States	The full-rigged ship departed from Boston, Massachusetts for Bombay, India. No further trace, reported missing. She was on her maiden voyage.
Nuphar	United Kingdom	The steamship ran aground at Dagerort, Russia. She was on a voyage from Leith, Lothian to Kronstadt, Russia. She was refloated and completed her voyage in a leaky condition. Subsequently repaired.
Three Brothers	United States	The 357-ton whaler, a barque, was abandoned in the Arctic Ocean near Point Barrow, Department of Alaska, after ice stove in her hull.
Wave	United Kingdom	The schooner struck a rock at "Aas", Norway and was beached. She was on a voyage from Saint Petersburg, Russia to Portsoy Aberdeenshire and/or Bo'ness, Lothian.

== 12 September ==
List of shipwrecks: 12 September 1877
Ship	State	Description
Mexican	United Kingdom	The steamship departed from Port Royal, Jamaica for Liverpool, Lancashire. No further trace, presumed foundered with the loss of all 40 crew. A steamship seen on 28 October 12 leagues (36 nautical miles (67 km)) off the Azores abandoned and sinking at the stern, with collision damage, may have been the Mexican.
Uli	United Kingdom	The ship was wrecked on the Mexican coast. She was on a voyage from Veracruz, Mexico to a British port.

== 13 September ==
List of shipwrecks: 13 September 1877
Ship	State	Description
Blanche et Louis	France	The brigantine was driven ashore and severely damaged on Langness, opposite Hango Hill, Isle of Man. Her six crew were rescued by the Castletown Lifeboat Commercial Traveller No. 2 ( Royal National Lifeboat Institution). Blanche et Louis was on a voyage from Bilbao, Spain to Ardrossan, Ayrshire, United Kingdom. She was refloated on 21 September and towed to Ardrossan by the tug Knight of the Cross (United Kingdom).
Maggie Kelso	United Kingdom	The schooner was driven ashore and severely damaged at Castletown, Isle of Man. Her three crew were rescued by the Castletown Lifeboat Commercial Traveller No. 2 ( Royal National Lifeboat Institution). Maggie Kelso was on a voyage from Glendore, County Cork to Inverness. She was refloated on 19 September and taken in to Castletown for temporary repairs.

== 14 September ==
List of shipwrecks: 14 September 1877
Ship	State	Description
Carl et Louise	United Kingdom	The ship ran aground on the Tegeler Bank, in the North Sea off the German coast. Her crew were rescued. She was on a voyage from Portmadoc, Caernarfonshire, United Kingdom to Geestemünde, Germany.
Charmer	United Kingdom	The ship was driven ashore on Dyer's Island, Cape Colony. Her nineteen crew survived. She was on a voyage from Moulmein, Burma to Amsterdam, North Holland, Netherlands. She subsequently broke up.
Retriever	United Kingdom	The steamship was driven ashore at Lindisfarne, Northumberland. She was refloated.
Rifondo	Norway	The barque was struck rocks and sank at Swona, Orkney Islands, United Kingdom with the loss of all hands. She was on a voyage from "Novikoping" to a Scottish port.

== 15 September ==
List of shipwrecks: 15 September 1877
Ship	State	Description
County of Berwick	United Kingdom	The ship ran aground at Saugor, India. She subsequently became a wreck. She was refloated in early November and towed in to Calcutta, India.
Eskdale	United Kingdom	The steamship was driven ashore at "Sandre", Gotland, Sweden. She was on a voyage from West Hartlepool, County Durham to a Finnish port. She was refloated with assistance and towed in to Burgsvik.
Lincoln	United States	The barque was abandoned at sea. All on board were rescued by the barque Brigida (Norway). Lincoln was on a voyage from Liverpool, Lancashire, United Kingdom to New York.
Madona	United Kingdom	The steamship foundered off the Sanda Rock with the loss of all hands, according to a message in a bottle that washed up in Loch Crerar in late October.
Marie	Norway	The schooner sank off Osmussaar, Russia. Her crew were rescued. SHe was on a voyage from Saint Petersburg, Russia to Ardrossan, Ayrshire, United Kingdom.
Minnie Irvine	United Kingdom	The steamship was driven ashore at Maassluis, South Holland, Netherlands. She was on a voyage from Kronstadt, Russia to Rotterdam, South Holland. She was later refloated.
Prospect	United Kingdom	The ship was driven ashore at Exmouth, Devon. She was on a voyage from Exmouth to Harburg, Germany. She was refloated but found to be leaky.
Vooruit	Netherlands	The galiot was driven ashore on Skagen, Denmark. She was on a voyage from Fraserburgh, Aberdeenshire, United Kingdom to Stettin, Germany.
W. A. Farnsworth	United States	The 432-ton whaler, a barque, capsized and sank in the Beaufort Sea off Point Barrow, Department of Alaska, about 50 nautical miles (93 km; 58 mi) east of Cape Lisburne 20 minutes after she struck a piece of ice that stove in her bow. Her entire crew took to her whaleboats and were rescued by the bark Thomas Pope (United States).

== 16 September ==
List of shipwrecks: 16 September 1877
Ship	State	Description
Admiralen	Norway	The schooner was abandoned in the North Sea. Her crew were rescued by Ernst Elise (Germany). Admiralen was on a voyage from Fredrikstad to Leith, Lothian, United Kingdom.
Brise, and Matilde	France; Spain	The steamship Matilde collided with Brise, which sank off Cadaqués, Spain. Matilde rescued her crew. Brise was on a voyage from Oran, Algeria to "La Nouvelle". Matilde was on a voyage from Cette, Hérault to Barcelona. She was beached at Cadaqués.
Coronet	United Kingdom	The steamship ran aground at Alexandria, Egypt. She was on a voyage from Newport, Monmouthshire to Alexandria. She was refloated but found to be severely leaky and was beached.
Hampden	United Kingdom	The ship caught fire and was abandoned in the South Atlantic. Her 28 crew took to four boats. Nineteen crew in two of the boats reached the Seychelles; those in two other boars were reported missing. Hampden was on a voyage from a British port to Bombay, India.
Miranda	New Zealand	The 23-ton cutter was wrecked after stranding on Great Barrier Island, New Zealand.
Standard	United Kingdom	The barque was wrecked at Lemvig, Denmark. Her crew were rescued. She was on a voyage from Sunderland, County Durham to Gävle, Sweden.

== 17 September ==
List of shipwrecks: 17 September 1877
Ship	State	Description
Adler	Germany	The steamship was wrecked in the Wittsand, off Neuwerk. Her crew were rescued. She was on a voyage from Elbing to Wilhelmshaven.
C. S. de Forrest	Canada	The ship was wrecked at Cow Bay, Nova Scotia.
Laurite	United Kingdom	The schooner was wrecked on the Wittsand. Her crew survived. She was on a voyage from Peterhead, Aberdeenshire to Hamburg, Germany.
Mary	(United Kingdom of Great Britain and Ireland) Isle of Man	The smack was severely damaged by and explosion and fire at Liverpool, Lancashire with the loss of one of her three crew. Both survivors were severely wounded.
Thomas	United Kingdom	The schooner was destroyed by fire at Liverpool, Lancashire.
Ueckermünde	Germany	The ship was wrecked at Lemvig, Denmark with the loss of four of her crew. She was on a voyage from Leith, Lothian, United Kingdom to Riga, Russia.

== 18 September ==
List of shipwrecks: 18 September 1877
Ship	State	Description
Adler	Germany	The steamship was wrecked on the Witt Sand. She was on a voyage from Elbing to Wilhelmshaven.
Pallas	(United Kingdom of Great Britain and Ireland) Jersey	The ketch ran aground on the Goodwin Sands, Kent. She was on a voyage from Pori, Grand Duchy of Finland to Havre de Grâce, Seine-Inférieure, France. She was refloated with assistance from the lugger Florence Nightingale (United Kingdom) and taken in to The Downs.
Rescue	United Kingdom	The ship was driven ashore at Duncansby Head, Sutherland. She was on a voyage from Quebec City, Canada to Sunderland, County Durham.
United States	United Kingdom	The tug collided with the steamship Zephyr and was beached near Woodside, Cheshire.

== 19 September ==
List of shipwrecks: 19 September 1877
Ship	State	Description
Ada	Russia	The schooner was driven ashore at Cap Gris Nez, Pas-de-Calais, France. She was on a voyage from Helsinki, Grand Duchy of Finland to Caen, Calvados, France. She was refloated and taken in to Boulogne, Pas-de-Calais in a severely leaky condition.
Bell	Sweden	The ship was driven ashore 4 nautical miles (7.4 km) west of Dunkirk, Nord, France. She was on a voyage from Härnösand to Honfleur, Manche, France.
Black Watch	Canada	The full-rigged ship was wrecked on the coast of Fair Isle in the Shetland Islands while attempting to navigate a channel at night in misty weather. Her 23 crew were rescued. She was on a voyage from Bremerhaven, Germany to New York, United States.
Borchia	United Kingdom	The barque ran aground near the Porkkala Lighthouse, Grand Duchy of Finland. She was on a voyage from Kronstadt, Russia to a Dutch port.
Johanne	Germany	The schooner was driven ashore at "Grisselove", Denmark. She was on a voyage from an English port to "Kallundborg". She was later refloated with assistance.
Mercade	Canada	The brig departed from Sydney, Nova Scotia for Saint John's, Newfoundland Colony. No further trace, presumed foundered with the loss of all hands.
Resolut	Norway	The barque was driven ashore. She was on a voyage from Loviisa, Grand Duchy of Finland to a Dutch port. She was refloated and taken in to Copenhagen, Denmark in a leaky condition. Subsequently placed under repair.
Rouen	United Kingdom	The steamship was driven ashore on Hogland, Russia. She was on a voyage from Blyth, Northumberland to Kronstadt. She was refloated and completed her voyage.

== 21 September ==
List of shipwrecks: 21 September 1877
Ship	State	Description
Wasdale	United Kingdom	The full-rigged ship collided with the barque Craigmullen (United Kingdom) in the Pacific Ocean. She sank the next day. All on board were rescued by Craigmullen. Wasdale was on a voyage from Liverpool, Lancashire to San Francisco, California, United States.

== 22 September ==
List of shipwrecks: 22 September 1877
Ship	State	Description
Cardigan Castle	United Kingdom	The ship ran aground on the Mixon Shoal, in the English Channel off the coast of Sussex. She was on a voyage from London to Melbourne, Victoria. She was refloated and resumed her voyage.
Glenfinart	United Kingdom	The ship ran aground in the Saint Lawrence River at Lavaltrie, Quebec, Canada. She was on a voyage from Montreal, Quebec, to Glasgow, Renfrewshire. She was refloated on 25 September and taken in to Quebec City.
Nora	United Kingdom	The sloop was wrecked on the Pentland Skerries, Orkney Islands. Both crew were rescued. She was on a voyage from Orphir, Orkney Islands to Thurso, Caithness.
Tees	United Kingdom	The steamship was driven ashore at Bordeaux, Gironde, France.

== 24 September ==
List of shipwrecks: 24 September 1877
Ship	State	Description
Æolus	Norway	The barque ran aground on the Middelgrunden, in the Baltic Sea. She was on a voyage from Sundsvall, Sweden to an English port. She was refloated with assistance.
Cricket	United States	The barque was lost off Cabo Frio, Brazil. She was on a voyage from Rio de Janeiro, Brazil to Baltimore, Maryland.
Hercules	Norway	The barque ran aground on the Middelgrunden. She was on a voyage from Söderhamn, Sweden to London, United Kingdom. She was refloated with assistance and resumed her voyage.
Inch Kenneth	United Kingdom	The steamship foundered off Cape St. Francis, Cape Colony with the loss of nineteen of her 27 crew. Survivors were rescued by the full-rigged ship Liverpool (United Kingdom).

== 25 September ==
List of shipwrecks: 25 September 1877
Ship	State	Description
Arrutoi	Austria-Hungary	The barque ran aground on the Hormigas Islands. She was on a voyage from Alexandroupoli, Greece to Cork, United Kingdom. She was refloated towed in to Cartagena, Spain in a sinking condition and was beached there.
Laurel	United Kingdom	The steamship was damaged in an accident at Montrose, Forfarshire whilst being put on a slipway.
Maggie	United Kingdom	The ship was wrecked on the Loggerhead Reef, off the coast of New York. She was on a voyage from Pensacola, Florida, United States to London.

== 27 September ==
List of shipwrecks: 27 September 1877
Ship	State	Description
Kong Carl	Flag unknown	The ship ran aground on the Pluckington Bank, in Liverpool Bay. She was refloated with the assistance of a tug and taken in to Liverpool Lancashire, United Kingdom.
Magnolia	United States	The sidewheel paddle steamer sank in a storm. There were no casualties.
Vanguard	United Kingdom	The ship was sighted off the coast of the Natal Colony whilst on a voyage from Colombo, Ceylon to London. No further trace, reported missing.

== 28 September ==
List of shipwrecks: 28 September 1877
Ship	State	Description
Dinas, and Galilee	United Kingdom; France	The steamship Galilee collided with the steamship Dinas and sank off Penarth Head, Glamorgan, United Kingdom. Her crew were rescued. Galilee was on a voyage from Cardiff, Glamorgan to La Rochelle, Charente-Inférieure. Dinas was severely damaged. She put in to Cardiff.
St. Croix	United Kingdom	The barque was abandoned in the Atlantic Ocean. All on board were rescued by the barque Giovanni D. (Austria-Hungary).

== 29 September ==
List of shipwrecks: 29 September 1877
Ship	State	Description
Giovanni II.	Italy	The barque ran aground at Cagliari, Sardinia. She was on a voyage from Cardiff, Glamorgan, United Kingdom to Naples. She was refloated.
Ocean	United Kingdom	The barque ran aground at Cagliari. She was on a voyage from Newcastle upon Tyne, Northumberland to Cagliari. She was refloated.
Sobraon	United Kingdom	The ship was driven ashore in the River Thames downstream of Tilbury Fort, Essex. She was on a voyage from London to Port Phillip, Victoria.
Unnamed	United Kingdom	The fishing smack was run down and sunk off the Isle of Man by the steamship Antrim (United Kingdom) with the loss of one of her two crew. The survivor was rescued by Antrim.

== 30 September ==
List of shipwrecks: 30 September 1877
Ship	State	Description
Drachenfels	United Kingdom	The barge was holed by an anchor and sank at Harwich, Essex.

== Unknown date ==
List of shipwrecks: Unknown date in September 1877
Ship	State	Description
Advena	United Kingdom	The ship struck floating wreckage off Whitby, Yorkshire. She was on a voyage from Blyth, Northumberland to Bahia, Brazil. She put in to Ryde, Isle of Wight, where she was beached.
Albert	United Kingdom	The brig was driven ashore at Hartlepool, County Durham. She was on a voyage from Onega, Russia to Hartlepool.
Albert	Norway	The ship was driven ashore at the "Bjorn Lighthouse". She was on a voyage from Ny Carleby, Sweden to Bergen.
Alma	Germany	The schooner was driven ashore in Algoa Bay. Her crew were rescued.
Alonzo	United Kingdom	The ship was driven ashore and wrecked in the Tusket Islands, Nova Scotia, Canada.
Anna	United Kingdom	The ship was driven ashore and severely damaged at Crail, Fife.
Balcombe	United Kingdom	The barque was damaged by fire at St. Ann's, Jamaica.
British Lion	United Kingdom	The ship was driven ashore at Heath Point, Canada. She was on a voyage from Newcastle upon Tyne, Northumberland to Quebec City, Canada. She was a total loss.
Cameo	United Kingdom	The ship was wrecked on Anticosti Island, Nova Scotia. Her crew were rescued. She was on a voyage from Quebec City to Grangemouth, Stirlingshire.
Catharina Maria	Flag unknown	The ship ran aground on the Colorado Reefs, off the coast of Cuba. She was later refloated and taken in to Havana, Cuba.
Cecilia and Maria	United Kingdom	The ship was wrecked at Gravelines, Nord, France. Her crew were rescued. She was on a voyage from East Wemyss, Fife to Gravelines.
Charles Northcote	United Kingdom	The ship was driven ashore. She was on a voyage from Gloucester to Quebec City. She was refloated and completed her voyage, arriving on 9 September.
Countess of Dudley	United Kingdom	The ship was driven ashore at East London, Cape Colony. Her crew were rescued.
Dauntless	(Dominion of Newfoundland) Newfoundland Colony	The tug was wrecked at Saint John's.
Dawn	United Kingdom	The yacht was driven ashore near Southend Pier, Essex.
Diego	Flag unknown	The steamship was destroyed by fire in the Atlantic Ocean. Her 23 crew were rescued by Arklow (United Kingdom).
Dorothea	Denmark	The brig was driven ashore at Smyrna, Ottoman Empire.
Eliza Bertha	United Kingdom	The ship was driven ashore at Coalhouse Fort, Essex. She was on a voyage from Guernsey, Channel Islands to London.
Glendale	United Kingdom	The ship struck the Frying Pan Shoals and foundered. She was on a voyage from Charleston, South Carolina, United Kingdom to Queenstown, County Cork.
Hermann	Germany	The brig ran aground at Westkapelle, West Flanders, Belgium. She was on a voyage from Ghent, East Flanders, Belgium to a Baltic port. She was refloated and towed in to Vlissingen, Zeeland, Netherlands.
Ida J	United Kingdom	The ship was abandoned at sea before 24 September. Her crew were rescued. She was on a voyage from Saint John, New Brunswick, Canada to Crookhaven, County Cork.
Irishman	United Kingdom	The steamship was driven ashore and wrecked at Ballyhalbert, County Down. All on board were rescued. She was on avoyage from Dublin to Glasgow, Renfrewshire. She was refloated on 30 September and taken in to Belfast, County Antrim for repairs.
James Davidson	United Kingdom	The ship ran aground at Visby, Sweden. She was on a voyage from Sundsvall, Sweden to Avilés, Spain. She was refloated with assistance.
Jeantine	Sweden	The ship was abandoned at sea. Her crew were rescued by Heeinse (Netherlands). Jeantine was on a voyage from Grangemouth to Gothenburg.
Johanna Cardina	Sweden	The schooner was abandoned in the North Sea between 13 and 21 September. She was on a voyage from Newcastle upon Tyne, Northumberland to Stockholm. She was towed in to Gothenburg in a derelict condition by the steamship Malaren (Sweden).
Johanne	Germany	The schooner was driven ashore at "Gisselooe". She was on a voyage from an English port to "Kallundborg".
Juste	France	The sloop was wrecked at Lézardrieux, Côtes-du-Nord. She was on a voyage from Pontrieux, Côtes-du-Nord to Libourne, Gironde.
Lake Megantic	United Kingdom	The steamship was driven ashore near Montreal, Quebec Canada. She was on a voyage from Montreal to Liverpool, Lancashire.
Lufra	Flag unknown	The steamship was driven ashore or ran aground. She was refloated on 8 September and taken in to Kronstadt, Russia.
Madonna delle Grazie	Italy	The brig collided with the steamship Malta (United Kingdom in the Mediterranean Sea. Her crew were rescued by Malta.
Maria Victorina	France	The ship struck a rock off Saint-Quay-Portrieux, Côtes-du-Nord and was wrecked.
Mary Fry	United Kingdom	The ship was driven ashore near Quebec City. She was on a voyage from Quebec City to Liverpool. She was refloated and put back to Quebec City in a leaky condition.
Matthias Major	Germany	The barque was wrecked 30 nautical miles (56 km) south of "Slico", United States of Colombia. Her crew were rescued.
Meggie	(United Kingdom of Great Britain and Ireland) Guernsey	The brig was wrecked on the Loggerhead Reef, in the Dry Tortugas before 26 September. Her crew were rescued. She was on a voyage from Pensacola, Florida to London.
Minna	Norway	The schooner was abandoned in the North Sea. Some of her crew were rescued by the barque Friedrich (Germany).
Mistley Park	United Kingdom	The ship was driven ashore in Carmarthen Bay. Her crew were rescued.
Ringleader	United Kingdom	The smack ran aground on the Scroby Sands, Norfolk.
Sabrina	United Kingdom	The ship was wrecked on Cape Breton Island, Nova Scotia between 20 and 22 September.
Seppina	Austria-Hungary	The brig ran aground on the Dumpton Spit, off Broadstairs, Kent, United Kingdom. She was on a voyage from Memel, Germany to Cardiff, Glamorgan, United Kingdom. She was refloated and resumed her voyage.
St. George	United Kingdom	The ship was damaged at sea with some loss of life. Part of her crew were rescued. She was towed in to Calcutta, India on 17 September.
Univers	France	The barque was driven ashore in Algoa Bay. Her crew were rescued.
Urea	Spain	The schooner ran aground on the Shoebury Sand, in the Thames Estuary. She was on a voyage from London, United Kingdom to Antwerp, Belgium.
Valette	Canada	The ship was driven ashore. She was on a voyage from Pictou, Nova Scotia to Montreal, Quebec. She was refloated and taken in to Quebec City in a leaky condition.
Veranda	Norway	The schooner was discovered abandoned at sea by the brig Anna M. Wilhelmina (Netherlands, which towed her in to Copenhagen. Veranda had been on a voyage from Stavanger to Riga, Russia.
William Griffiths	United Kingdom	The steamship ran aground in the Nervión and was holed. She was refloated in early October.
Zuleika	United Kingdom	The ship arrived at Galle, Ceylon on fire. She was on a voyage from Cardiff, Glamorgan to Galle. The fire was extinguished.
