= Henry Ernest Kendall =

Canadian politician

The Honourable Henry Ernest Kendall

19th Lieutenant Governor of Nova Scotia
- In office November 17, 1942 – August 12, 1947
- Monarch: George VI
- Governors General: The Earl of Athlone; The Viscount Alexander of Tunis
- Premier: A. S. MacMillan; Angus Lewis Macdonald
- Preceded by: Frederick Francis Mathers
- Succeeded by: John Alexander Douglas McCurdy

Personal details
- Born: April 29, 1864 Sydney, Nova Scotia
- Died: September 2, 1949 (aged 85) Windsor, Nova Scotia, Canada
- Party: Progressive Party of Canada
- Spouse(s): Ida B Burchell; Margaret McLennan
- Children: Helen Kendall (with first wife Ida); Jim Kendall (son)
- Relatives: John Stewart McLennan (father-in-law); Arthur Samuel Kendall (brother)
- Occupation: farmer, physician
- Profession: Politician

Henry Ernest Kendall (April 29, 1864 – September 2, 1949) was a Canadian physician and politician who served as the 19th Lieutenant Governor of Nova Scotia from 1942 to 1947.

== Biography ==
Kendall was the son of Samuel Frederick Kendall of Bristol, England and Emily Long of London. The couple settled in Sydney, Nova Scotia in 1857. Kendall, a member and pastor of the Plymouth Brethren, established the Union Church on Mitchell Island in 1866.

Kendall was widowed in June, 1909 following the death of his wife, Ida B Burchell. Ida's parents were George Burchell and Louisa Lorway from Sydney, Nova Scotia. In 1913, he married Margaret McLennan, daughter of John Stewart McLennan, an industrialist who would be appointed to the Senate of Canada several years later.

During World War I, Kendall enlisted in the Canadian Expeditionary Force and served as Lieutenant Colonel of the 9th Stationary Hospital based at Bramshott Military Hospital in England from 1916 to 1919.

In the 1921 federal election, Kendall was an unsuccessful candidate for the Progressive Party of Canada in Hants riding.

He was appointed Lieutenant-Governor of Nova Scotia at the age of 78, the oldest person to hold the office in the province's history.

Kendall's brother, Arthur Samuel Kendall, was also a physician and served as both an MLA in the Nova Scotia House of Assembly and as a federal Member of Parliament.

His son, Jim Kendall (1889-1942), played hockey with the Montreal Wanderers 1906–1907, emigrating to Sydney, Australia (returned to Canada to serve during World War I) and later worked for BHP. Kendall became a hockey great in his adopted home in Australia.

His daughter, Helen Kendall, was a military nurse who was one of 446 Canadians awarded a Royal Red Cross for her service in World War I.

== Electoral record ==
1921 Canadian federal election: Hants
Party	Candidate	Votes
Liberal	Lewis Herbert Martell	4,027
Conservative	Albert Parsons	3,795
Progressive	Henry Ernest Kendall	993
