= William Henry Allison =

Canadian politician (1838–1934)

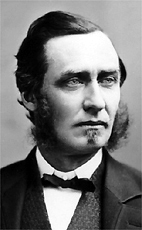

Member of Parliament for Hants
- In office 1878–1882
- Preceded by: Monson Henry Goudge
- In office 1882–1887
- Succeeded by: Alfred Putnam

Personal details
- Born: June 14, 1838 Newport, Colony of Nova Scotia
- Died: December 15, 1934 (aged 96) Chamberlain, South Dakota, U.S.
- Party: Conservative
- Profession: school lands commissioner

William Henry Allison (June 14, 1838 – December 15, 1934) was a Canadian politician and school lands commissioner. He was elected as a Conservative to the House of Commons of Canada in the 1878 election in the riding of Hants and re-elected in 1882.

Allison was the son of James Whidden Allison, who had served as a member of the provincial assembly, and Margaret Elder. Allison was educated in Sackville, New Brunswick and later was a captain in the local militia. Between 1871 and 1878, he was a member of the Legislative Assembly of Nova Scotia for Hants County. Allison ran unsuccessfully for a seat in the House of Commons in 1874.

His brother David served as president of Mount Allison University. He moved to Chamberlain, South Dakota for his health. As his health continued to decline he became a pauper and became dependent on public charity. He died at age 96.

== Electoral record ==
1874 Canadian federal election: Hants
Party	Candidate	Votes
Liberal	Monson Henry Goudge	1,433
Conservative	William Henry Allison	1,341
lop.parl.ca

1878 Canadian federal election: Hants
Party	Candidate	Votes
Conservative	William Henry Allison	1,662
Liberal	Monson Henry Goudge	1,381

1882 Canadian federal election: Hants
Party	Candidate	Votes
Conservative	William Henry Allison	1,386
Liberal	William Curry	1,341
