= Bennett Smith (shipbuilder) =

Canadian politician (1808–1886)

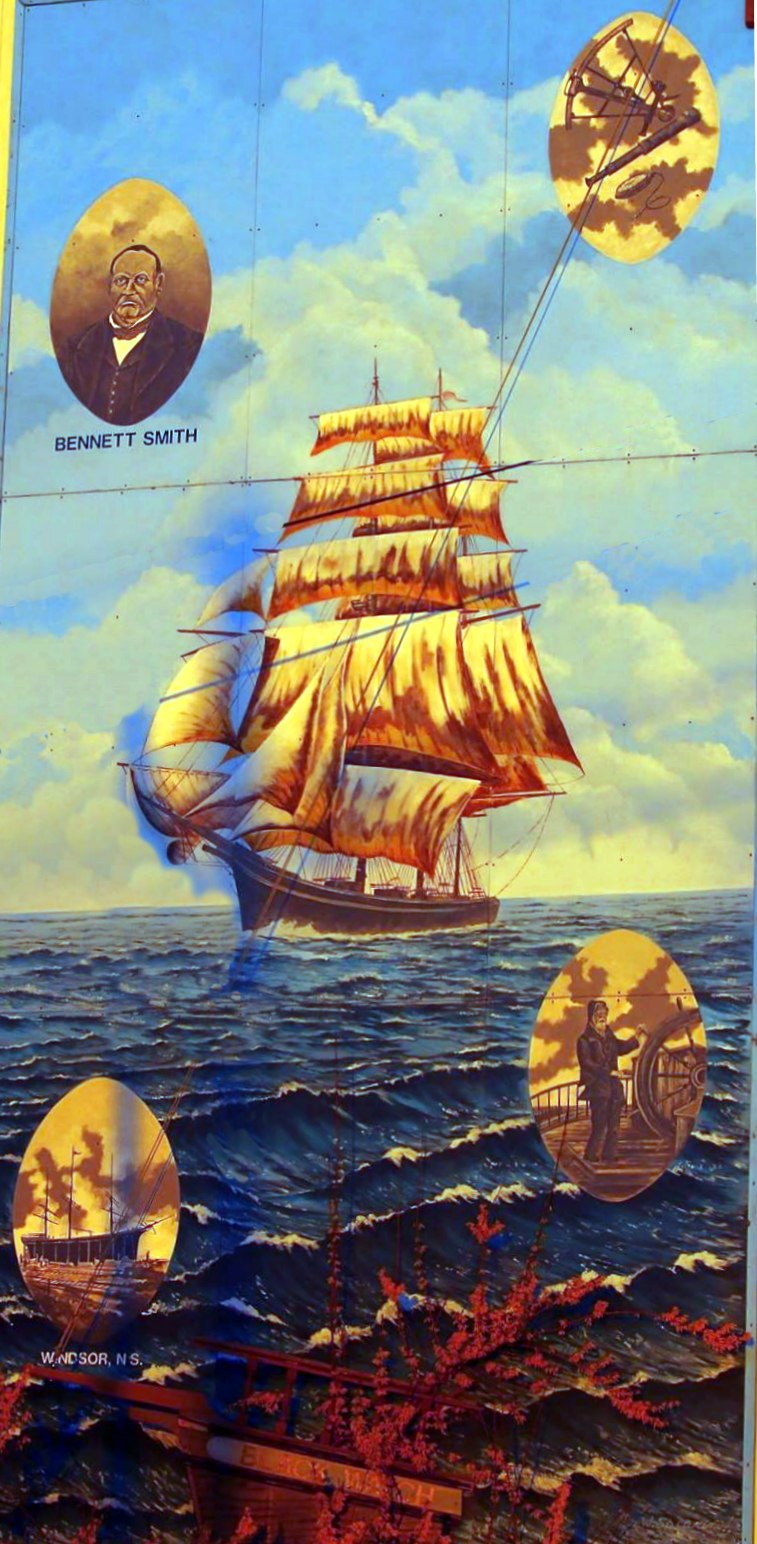
Bennett Smith Black Watch

Bennett Smith (November 29, 1808 – January 11, 1886) was a shipbuilder and shipowner in Nova Scotia, Canada. Smith briefly served as a member of the Nova Scotia House of Assembly for Hants County in 1858 and 1859 as a Liberal member.

He was born in Windsor, Nova Scotia, the son of John Smith and Ann Grant. He learned the craft of shipbuilding from his father, and he and his brothers inherited their father's shipyard, located on Smith's Island at the intersection of the Avon and St. Croix Rivers, in 1832. In the same year, Smith married Rachel Harris.

During the early 1840s, Smith was involved in farming and the timber trade but returned again to shipbuilding. He built 27 large ships involved in foreign trade, owning and operating all but one; he also owned shares in other vessels.

He was elected to the provincial assembly in 1858 following the death of Ichabod Dimock; he did not run for reelection in the general election the following year.

Smith's final Windsor-built ship, launched in May 1877 to great fanfare, was the full rigged, 1318 ton Black Watch. The ship cost $50,000.00 to construct. The Black Watch was wrecked on the craggy coast of Fair Isle on 19 September 1877, four months after she was launched in Nova Scotia on her maiden voyage. The crew, the ship's provisions as well as the sails and any salvageable hardware were all saved.

Smith had closed his shipyard upon completion of the Black Watch, reportedly over a wage dispute with his employees. He continued to order ships mainly from builders in Saint John, New Brunswick. Smith was also a director of the Avon Marine and Shipowners Insurance Company.

Steamers began to gain prominence on the seas in the 1870s and wooden shipbuilding began a serious decline. Cargo could be transported quicker and for a cheaper price by steamer than by sailing ship. The post Confederation policy of the Canadian government forced trade with Upper Canada, using the inland railway. Smith found success with wooden sailing ships longer than most but after his death, the wooden ships that had been the pride of Windsor were being sold at low prices in Italy and Scandinavia as they could afford to run them. "Windsor, the town that had been noted for the size, number and seaworthiness of vessels built there, had gone by its prime. The days of shipbuilding in Windsor has passed forever".

Bennett Smith's sons Thomas and Charles took over his business after Smith's death in Windsor at the age of 87. Today a detailed mural of the Black Watch is painted on the old Hants Journal building on Gerrish Street in Windsor, N.S.as a proud reminder of the community's shipbuilding heritage.

== Family Life ==
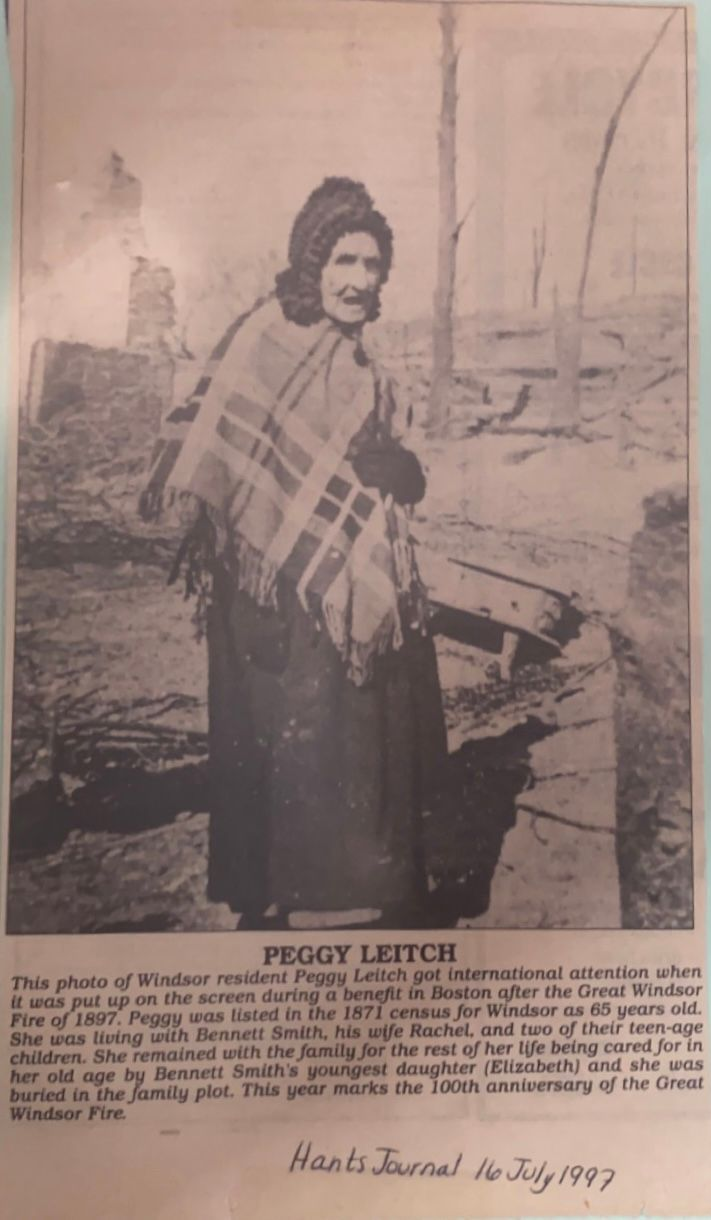
Peggy Leitch 1897. From the Great Windsor Fire. She was approximately 91 years old.

Peggy Leitch, a woman with a learning disability, was taken in by Mr. Bennett Smith from the “Poor House” as a nursemaid for his children. In the 1871 census, Peggy was recorded as being 65 years old and living with the Bennett, his wife Rachel, and two of their teenage children. Although she was still living with the Smiths in 1881, she was listed as being 70 in the census. Another 10 years later in 1891, she was listed as being 77. The inconsistencies in her reported age increases the difficulty of determining her birthday or how old she was when she died. In that same year while Peggy, and another domestic servant, Annie Brown, were living with the Smith family, Bennett and Rachel both passed.

Peggy was not listed in the 1901 census, and she died on March 3, 1901. She is buried in the Bennett Smith plot at Maplewood Cemetery without headstone. The Old Parish Burying Ground has a James Leich who died 6 January 1833 at the age of 64. Next to him was his wife, Mary Leich who died 28 May 1833 age 45. James and Mary could certainly have been Peggy's parents, but we do not have the documents to prove it.

The photo we have is of Peggy walking around the town of Windsor after the Great Fire of 1897 from a newspaper article. It is said that her story has reached many, and when people seen it in Boston they were amazed and started chanting “Peggy! Peggy! Peggy!”
