= Hadley Brown Tremain =

Canadian politician

Hadley Brown Tremain (October 23, 1874 – October 11, 1951) was a lawyer and political figure in Nova Scotia, Canada. He represented Hants in the House of Commons of Canada from 1911 to 1921 as a Conservative.

He was born in Port Hood, Nova Scotia, the son of Edward D. Tremain and Emma Hadley, and was educated at the Port Hood Academy, at King's College in Windsor and at Harvard Law School. Tremain practiced law in Windsor, Nova Scotia. In 1899, he married Alice King Wiggins (1877 - 1931). Tremain served on the town council for Windsor from 1906 to 1909. From 1917 to 1921, he was a Unionist Party member. During World War I, Tremain was lieutenant-colonel commanding the 112th Battalion of Highlanders, which went overseas but was broken up to provide reinforcements for other battalions. Tremain returned home in June 1917 and was re-elected as a Unionist in 1917. He did not seek re-election in 1921 and died in Windsor at the age of 76.

== Electoral record ==
1911 Canadian federal election: Hants
Party	Candidate	Votes
Conservative	Hadley Brown Tremain	2,191
Liberal	Judson Burpee Black	2,105

1917 Canadian federal election: Hants
Party	Candidate	Votes
Government (Unionist)	Hadley Brown Tremain	2,989
Opposition (Laurier Liberals)	Lewis Herbert Martell	2,696
