= John Stewart McLennan =

Canadian politician

The Honourable John Stewart McLennan
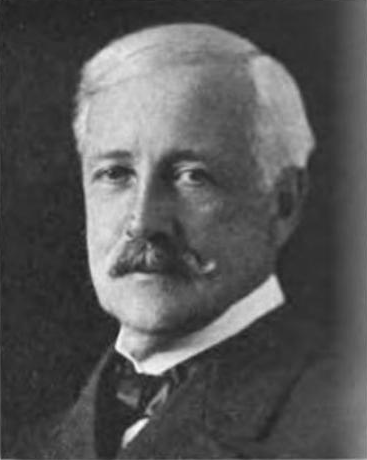

Member of the Senate of Canada for Sydney, Nova Scotia division
- In office 10 February 1916 – 15 September 1939

Personal details
- Born: John Stewart McLennan; 5 November 1853 Montreal, Canada East
- Died: 15 September 1939 (aged 85) Ottawa, Ontario, Canada
- Party: Conservative
- Relatives: Henry Ernest Kendall (son-in-law)
- Profession: industrialist, publisher

John Stewart McLennan (5 November 1853 – 15 September 1939) was a Conservative member of the Senate of Canada. He was born in Montreal, Quebec and became an industrialist and publisher.

The son of Hugh McLennan and Isabella Stewart, he was educated at the High School of Montreal, McGill University, and Concordia, and moved to Sydney, Nova Scotia. In 1904, he bought the Sydney Post (later the Post-Record). McLennan was married twice: to Louise Bradley in 1881 and to Grace Henoys Tytus in 1915. He was a director of Dominion Iron and Steel Company and the Dominion Coal Company. McLennan was the author of Louisbourg, from its foundation to its fall, 1713-1758, first published in 1918.

He was appointed to the Senate on 10 February 1916 for the Sydney, Nova Scotia division following nomination by Prime Minister Robert Borden. McLennan remained a Senator until his death on 15 September 1939.
