= Hants County Exhibition =

Canadian annual agricultural fair

Coordinates: 44°59′28″N 64°6′54″W

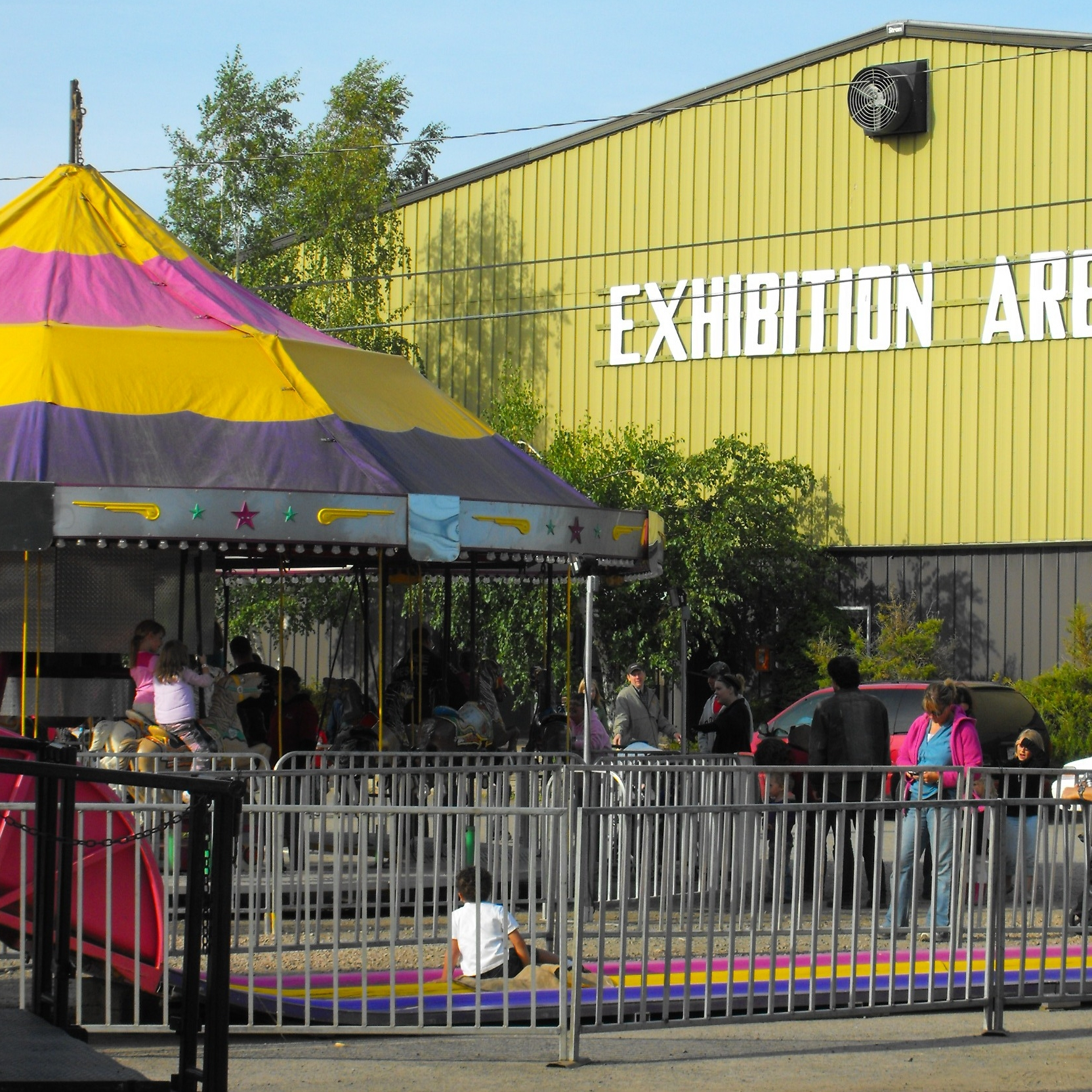
Hants County Exhibition fairgrounds, showing the Hants Exhibition Arena in the background

The Hants County Exhibition is an annual fall fair held in Windsor, Nova Scotia. It is known for being the oldest continuously run agricultural fair in North America. It was first held on the grounds of Fort Edward beginning in 1765 and has been running continuously since 1815.The fair has been held at the nearby Hants Exhibition Arena and exhibition grounds since the land was purchased in 1949. September 2015 marked the 250th anniversary of the Hants County Exhibition. Five years later, the fair went virtual because of the COVID-19 pandemic in Canada.

== The Windsor Agricultural Society ==
Hants County Exhibition Park is owned and operated by the Windsor Agricultural Society. The main goal of the society is to continue to host the agricultural exhibition annually. The main income of the society is through revenue made during the exhibition events, as well as renting the facilities during other times of the year. When available, the Society applies for federal and provincial grant programs. The Society consists of over 70 volunteer committee members and directors with six seasonal employees.

== The exhibition ==
The Hants County Exhibition is held annually over two weekends in September. The fair hosts a wide range of activities to highlight agriculture. During the first weekend, local 4-H clubs of Hants County come together to showcase their projects they have worked on throughout the year and show off their animals they have raised and trained. These projects include Lifeskills such as cake decorating, crafts, foods, scrapbooking, photography, welding, small engines, great outdoorsmen and more. 4-H Livestock that are shown at the exhibition include dairy, beef, sheep, goat, light horse, mini horse, dog obedience, rabbit, poultry and waterfowl. Also during the first weekend, other livestock events are happening including draft horse classes, ox pulls, horse pulls, Maritime Barrel Racing and pole bending.

The second weekend of the exhibition is also full of livestock and agriculture events. This includes the Classic Heritage Beef Show, which is the largest beef cattle show in the Maritimes drawing in over 200 head of beef cattle. Also during the second weekend, there are hunter and jumper classes held in the main arena, as well as western performance horse classes. During both weekends, there are numerous horticulture, vegetable, craft and art exhibits displayed. There are many local vendors set up and live music and events to watched and enjoyed. A large midway set up on the grounds for kids to enjoy over both weekends including amusement rides and carnival rides.

For the remainder of the year, the exhibition grounds hosts many other events in their various buildings on the property including the main Exhibition Arena with 2,500 seats, 4 large barns, and other exhibit building. There is a pumpkin weigh-off featuring pumpkins grown with Atlantic Giant seeds. A hockey rink is on site home to the West Hants Warriors minor hockey. and is well used by the community. After the winter months, the ice is removed from the rink and replaced with sand to accommodate for equine events for Avon Pony Club and other equestrian society events. There is a large horse barn on site and a smaller riding arena for lessons and events.
