= Hants Exhibition Arena =

Arena in Windsor, Nova Scotia, Canada

Coordinates: 44°59′28″N 64°6′54″W

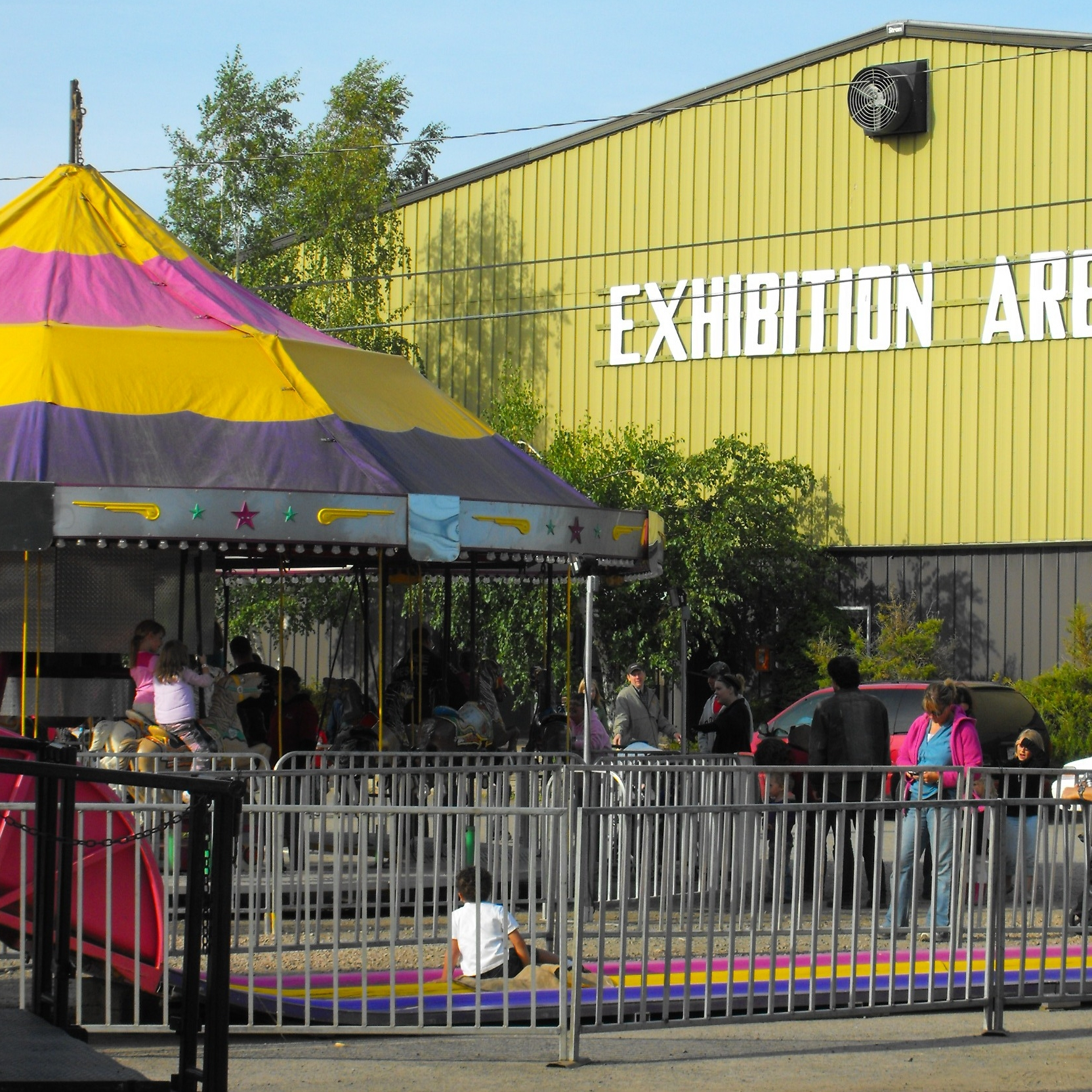
Hants Exhibition Arena

The Hants Exhibition Arena is owned by the Windsor Agricultural Society and is located at 239 Wentworth Street in Windsor, Nova Scotia. The arena is home to the Hants County Exhibition (the oldest agricultural fair in North America), along with the following hockey teams: Valley Maple Leafs of the Nova Scotia Junior Hockey League, Avon View Avalanche, Kings-Edgehill High School Avon River Rats and West Hants Minor Hockey. The arena was built in 1981 and has a seating capacity of 2300 people.

The arena has hosted numerous Nova Scotia 4-H Provincial Shows and the 2001 Don Johnson Cup tournament. CBC's Hockey Day in Canada in 2002 was broadcast from here. The arena also plays host to showjumping, the annual pumpkin weighoff, the occasional concert and many horse shows throughout the summer season.
