= Helen Kendall =

Canadian military nurse (1892–1985)

Helen Kendall ARRC
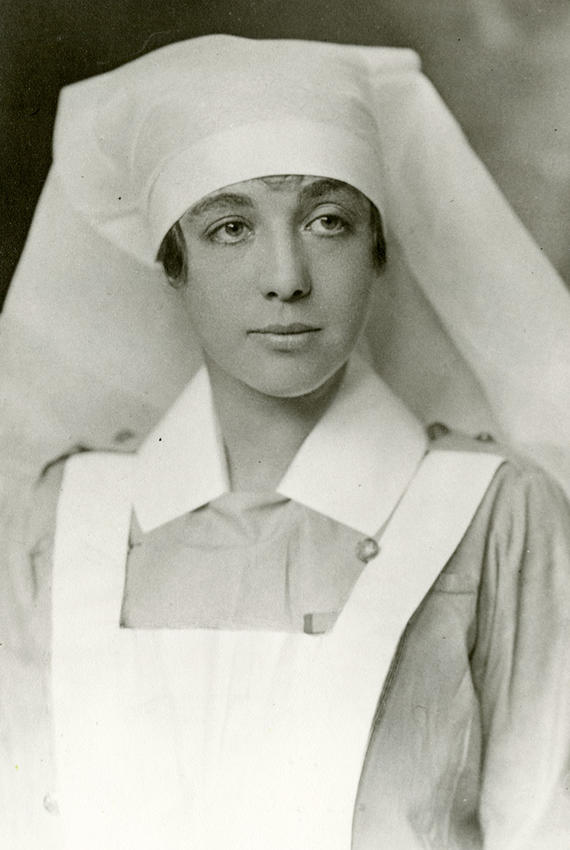
- Helen Kendall in 1919
- Born: Helen Mary Kendall; 29 October 1892; Sydney, Nova Scotia, Canada
- Died: 4 December 1985 (aged 93); Cape Breton Island, Nova Scotia, Canada
- Relatives: Henry Ernest Kendall (father)
- Military career
- Branch: Royal Canadian Army Medical Corps
- Rank: Lieutenant
- Awards: Royal Red Cross (Class 2)

Helen Mary Kendall ARRC (29 October 1892 – 4 December 1985) was a Canadian military nurse from Nova Scotia. She was one of 446 Canadians awarded the Royal Red Cross for her military service during the First World War. A graduate of the Royal Victoria Hospital in Montreal, Kendall served with the Royal Canadian Army Medical Corps during both the First World War and Second World War.

== Life and career ==
Helen Kendall was born in Sydney, Nova Scotia on 29 October 1892, the daughter of Henry Ernest Kendall, a respected physician who also served in the First World War. She trained in surgical nursing at the Royal Victoria Hospital in Montreal, graduating in 1916. Following her graduation, she briefly practised as an anaesthetist.

In March 1917, Kendall sailed aboard HMHS Essequibo in March 1917 and served in the Royal Canadian Army Medical Corps as a nursing sister. She was one of about 3,000 Canadian women to serve in this way during the First World War. During the voyage the ship was intercepted by a German submarine, but was allowed to continue, arriving at its destination the following day on 16 March 1917. Her first posting during the war was at No. 16 Canadian General Hospital in Orpington, Kent, England.

Later in 1917, Kendall was deployed to military hospitals in France. In May 1918, she was stationed at a hospital in Étaples, which came under heavy bombardment from German bomber aircraft attempting to destroy a nearby bridge. For her service during this period, she was awarded the Royal Red Cross (Class 2) in 1919, one of only 446 Canadians to receive the distinction.

In 1920, Kendall participated in post-war medical and educational missions in Romania, where she worked in both hospitals and nursing schools.

Following the First World War, Kendall continued to serve in England until 1919. She returned to military service during the Second World War, serving as a nurse at a hospital in Basingstoke until 1942, when she returned to Canada.

Kendall died on 4 December 1985 in Cape Breton at the age of 93. She never married and had no children.
