= Lewis Herbert Martell =

Canadian politician

Member of Parliament for Hants
- In office December 1921 – September 1925

Personal details
- Born: Lewis Herbert Martell; 26 March 1885 Main-à-Dieu, Nova Scotia
- Died: 24 August 1962 (aged 77) Halifax, Nova Scotia
- Party: Liberal
- Spouse(s): Ethel May MacDonald (m. 4 Sep 1915)
- Profession: lawyer

Lewis Herbert Martell (26 March 1885 – 24 August 1962) was a Liberal party member of the House of Commons of Canada.

== Biography ==
He was born in Main-à-Dieu, Nova Scotia and became a lawyer.The son of John Thomas Martell and Rachel A. Lewis, he was educated at the Sydney Academy, King's College and Dalhousie Law School. Martell practised law in Windsor, Nova Scotia. In 1916, he married Ethel Mary Macdonald.

He was first elected to Parliament at the Hants riding in the 1921 general election after an unsuccessful campaign there in the 1917 election as a Laurier Liberal. After completing his only term, the 14th Canadian Parliament, Martell left federal politics and did not seek re-election in the 1925 vote. He died of a stroke in Halifax on 24 August 1962.

== Electoral record ==
1917 Canadian federal election: Hants
Party	Candidate	Votes
Government (Unionist)	Hadley Brown Tremain	2,989
Opposition (Laurier Liberals)	Lewis Herbert Martell	2,696

1921 Canadian federal election: Hants
Party	Candidate	Votes
Liberal	Lewis Herbert Martell	4,027
Conservative	Albert Parsons	3,795
Progressive	Henry Ernest Kendall	993
