= Hants (federal electoral district) =

Former federal electoral district in Nova Scotia, Canada

Nova Scotia electoral district

Defunct federal electoral district
- Legislature: House of Commons
- District created: 1867
- District abolished: 1924
- First contested: 1867
- Last contested: 1921

Hants was a federal electoral district in Nova Scotia, Canada, that was represented in the House of Commons of Canada from 1867 to 1925. It was created in the British North America Act, 1867, and abolished in 1924 when it was merged into Hants—Kings riding. It consisted of Hants County.

== Members of Parliament ==
This riding elected the following members of Parliament:

| Parliament | Years | Member | Party |
|---|---|---|---|
Hants
| 1st | 1867–1869 | Joseph Howe | Anti-Confederation |
| 1st | 1869–1872 | Joseph Howe | Liberal–Conservative |
| 2nd | 1872–1873 | Joseph Howe | Liberal–Conservative |
| 2nd | 1873–1874 | Monson Henry Goudge | Liberal |
| 3rd | 1874–1878 | Monson Henry Goudge | Liberal |
| 4th | 1878–1882 | William Henry Allison | Conservative |
| 5th | 1882–1887 | William Henry Allison | Conservative |
| 6th | 1887–1891 | Alfred Putnam | Conservative |
| 7th | 1891–1896 | Alfred Putnam | Conservative |
| 8th | 1896–1900 | Allen Haley | Liberal |
| 9th | 1900–1904 | Benjamin Russell | Liberal |
| 10th | 1904–1908 | Benjamin Russell | Liberal |
| 11th | 1908–1911 | Benjamin Russell | Liberal |
| 12th | 1911–1917 | Hadley Brown Tremain | Conservative |
| 13th | 1917–1921 | Hadley Brown Tremain | Government (Unionist) |
| 14th | 1921–1925 | Lewis Herbert Martell | Liberal |
Riding dissolved into Hants—Kings

== Election results ==
1867 Canadian federal election: Hants
| Party | Candidate | Votes |
|---|---|---|
| Anti-Confederation | Joseph Howe | 1,530 |
| Unknown | James King | 956 |
Source: Canadian Elections Database

By-election on 24 April 1869 On Mr. Howe being called to the Privy Council and appointed President of that body, 19 January 1869
| Party | Candidate | Votes |
| Liberal–Conservative | Joseph Howe | 1,512 |
| Liberal | Monson Henry Goudge | 1,129 |

1872 Canadian federal election: Hants
| Party | Candidate | Votes |
|---|---|---|
| Liberal–Conservative | Joseph Howe | acclaimed |
Source: Canadian Elections Database

By-election on 5 July 1873 On Mr. Howe being named Lieutenant Governor of Nova Scotia, 7 May 1873
| Party | Candidate | Votes |
| Liberal | Monson Henry Goudge | acclaimed |

1874 Canadian federal election: Hants
| Party | Candidate | Votes |
|---|---|---|
| Liberal | Monson Henry Goudge | 1,433 |
| Conservative | William Henry Allison | 1,341 |
lop.parl.ca

1878 Canadian federal election: Hants
| Party | Candidate | Votes |
|---|---|---|
| Conservative | William Henry Allison | 1,662 |
| Liberal | Monson Henry Goudge | 1,381 |

1882 Canadian federal election: Hants
| Party | Candidate | Votes |
|---|---|---|
| Conservative | William Henry Allison | 1,386 |
| Liberal | William Curry | 1,341 |

1887 Canadian federal election: Hants
| Party | Candidate | Votes |
|---|---|---|
| Conservative | Alfred Putnam | 1,800 |
| Liberal | William Curry | 1,678 |

1891 Canadian federal election: Hants
| Party | Candidate | Votes |
|---|---|---|
| Conservative | Alfred Putnam | 1,705 |
| Liberal | Allen Haley | 1,604 |

1896 Canadian federal election: Hants
| Party | Candidate | Votes |
|---|---|---|
| Liberal | Allen Haley | 1,838 |
| Conservative | Alfred Putnam | 1,803 |

1900 Canadian federal election: Hants
| Party | Candidate | Votes |
|---|---|---|
| Liberal | Benjamin Russell | 1,882 |
| Conservative | Alfred Putnam | 1,866 |

1904 Canadian federal election: Hants
| Party | Candidate | Votes |
|---|---|---|
| Liberal | J.B. Black | 2,033 |
| Conservative | Frederick W. Hanright | 1,957 |

1908 Canadian federal election: Hants
| Party | Candidate | Votes |
|---|---|---|
| Liberal | Judson Burpee Black | 2,141 |
| Conservative | Frederick W. Hanright | 2,008 |

1911 Canadian federal election: Hants
| Party | Candidate | Votes |
|---|---|---|
| Conservative | Hadley Brown Tremain | 2,191 |
| Liberal | Judson Burpee Black | 2,105 |

1917 Canadian federal election: Hants
| Party | Candidate | Votes |
|---|---|---|
| Government (Unionist) | Hadley Brown Tremain | 2,989 |
| Opposition (Laurier Liberals) | Lewis Herbert Martell | 2,696 |

1921 Canadian federal election: Hants
| Party | Candidate | Votes |
|---|---|---|
| Liberal | Lewis Herbert Martell | 4,027 |
| Conservative | Albert Parsons | 3,795 |
| Progressive | Henry Ernest Kendall | 993 |

== See also ==
- List of Canadian electoral districts
- Historical federal electoral districts of Canada
