= Allen Haley =

Canadian politician

Allen Haley (January 31, 1844 – April 23, 1900) was a Canadian dentist, ship builder and political figure in Nova Scotia. He represented Hants County in the Nova Scotia House of Assembly from 1882 to 1890 and Hants in the House of Commons of Canada from 1896 to 1900 as a Liberal member.

He was born in Yarmouth, Nova Scotia, the son of Allen Haley and Harriet Utley, and was educated there. Haley went on to study at the Philadelphia College of Dental Surgery. He set up his dental practice in Windsor, Nova Scotia. In 1869, he married Annie M. Smith. He was secretary for the Shipowners Marine Insurance Company. Haley served as probate registrar for Hants County, a member of the Windsor town council and Warden for Windsor. He ran unsuccessfully for a federal seat in 1891. Haley died in office in Ottawa at the age of 56.

1891 Canadian federal election: Hants
Party	Candidate	Votes
Conservative	Alfred Putnam	1,705
Liberal	Allen Haley	1,604

1896 Canadian federal election: Hants
Party	Candidate	Votes
Liberal	Allen Haley	1,838
Conservative	Alfred Putnam	1,803
