= Monson Henry Goudge =

Canadian politician

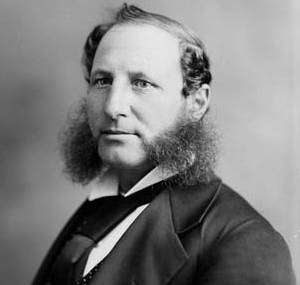
Monson Henry Goudge Source: Library and Archives Canada

Monson Henry Goudge (22 October 1829 – 1 March 1920) was a Canadian merchant and political figure. He represented Hants in the House of Commons of Canada from 1873 to 1878 as a Liberal member. His surname also appears as Gouge.Monson's middle name, recorded here as Henry is not supported by documentation - it is Hoit or Hoyt ( marriage certificate 1901).

He was born in Windsor, Nova Scotia, the son of Henry Goudge, and educated in Windsor. He ran unsuccessfully for a seat in the House of Commons against Joseph Howe in 1869 and was first elected in an 1873 by-election held after Howe was named Lieutenant Governor. He was defeated in a bid for reelection in 1878. Goudge was appointed to the Legislative Council of Nova Scotia for Hants County, serving from 1884 until his death. He also served as president of the council from 1903.

Goudge was married twice: first to Sophia E. Grant and then to Blanche E. Simpson in 1901. He was a director of the Mineral Exploration and Mining Association of Nova Scotia. Goudge died in Windsor at the age of 90.

== Electoral record ==
By-election on 24 April 1869 On Mr. Howe being called to the Privy Council and appointed President of that body, 19 January 1869
Party	Candidate	Votes
Liberal–Conservative	Joseph Howe	1,512
Liberal	Monson Henry Goudge	1,129

By-election on 5 July 1873 On Mr. Howe being named Lieutenant Governor of Nova Scotia, 7 May 1873
Party	Candidate	Votes
Liberal	Monson Henry Goudge	acclaimed

1874 Canadian federal election: Hants
Party	Candidate	Votes
Liberal	Monson Henry Goudge	1,433
Conservative	William Henry Allison	1,341
lop.parl.ca

1878 Canadian federal election: Hants
Party	Candidate	Votes
Conservative	William Henry Allison	1,662
Liberal	Monson Henry Goudge	1,381
