= Alfred Putnam =

Canadian politician

Alfred Putnam (September 8, 1836 – October 12, 1904) was a ship builder and political figure in Nova Scotia, Canada. He represented Hants in the House of Commons of Canada from 1887 to 1896 as a Conservative member.

He was born in Noel, Hants County, Nova Scotia, of Scottish descent. He married Maggie Fleming in 1866. Putnam was president of the Hants County Marine Insurance Company. He ran unsuccessfully for reelection to the House of Commons in 1896 and 1900.

== Electoral record ==
1887 Canadian federal election: Hants
Party	Candidate	Votes
Conservative	Alfred Putnam	1,800
Liberal	William Curry	1,678

1891 Canadian federal election: Hants
Party	Candidate	Votes
Conservative	Alfred Putnam	1,705
Liberal	Allen Haley	1,604

1896 Canadian federal election: Hants
Party	Candidate	Votes
Liberal	Allen Haley	1,838
Conservative	Alfred Putnam	1,803

1900 Canadian federal election: Hants
Party	Candidate	Votes
Liberal	Benjamin Russell	1,882
Conservative	Alfred Putnam	1,866
