= Black Watch (full-rigged ship) =

1877 ship

Coordinates: 59.5050°N 1.6501°W

Black Watch was a large full-rigged ship built by Windsor shipbuilder Bennett Smith in Windsor, Nova Scotia. It was the last ship built by Smith in Windsor.

== Construction ==
Bennett Smith was the foremost owner, designer and master shipbuilder in Windsor. He ran a shipyard inherited from his father on Smith's Island, at the intersection of the Avon and St. Croix Rivers. With his brothers he built 27 ships in Windsor, the final one being the full-rigged, 1318-ton Black Watch. The ship cost $50,000.00 to construct and was launched in May 1877 to great fanfare. Upon completion of Black Watch, Smith closed his shipyard, reportedly over a wage dispute with his employees. Smith continued to invest in shipbuilding, mainly in Saint John, New Brunswick, and was a principal in the Avon Marine and Shipowners Insurance Company.

== Career and loss ==
Black Watch sailed from Windsor on 6 June 1877 bound for New York in ballast (heavy material placed in hold for stability). On board were a crew of 23 under the leadership of the veteran Captain Newcomb, who along with Smith held shares in the ownership of the vessel. Having taken on a cargo of oil, the ship sailed for Bremerhaven, Germany, on 17 July 1877, arriving on 20 August.

The ship left Germany in ballast (700 tons of stone and sand) on 10 September to cross the Atlantic and return to New York. Disaster struck as the ship attempted to navigate the waters between Shetland and Orkney in the north of Scotland. Black Watch was driven onto the rocks off the southwest point of Fair Isle while attempting to navigate the channel at night in misty weather. The crew, the ship's provisions as well as the sails and any salvageable hardware were all saved.

As recorded in the wreck report, Newcomb was negligent in attempting passage of a channel unfamiliar to him. The court determined that if the Captain was unable to obtain clear and concise instructions for navigating through the Scottish islands as he claimed, he should not have undertaken such a difficult and perilous passage. The court's final determination was that the accident was an error in judgment, but Newcomb's certificate was neither suspended nor revoked.
