= Henry Goudge =

Canadian politician

Henry Goudge (May 26, 1805 – October 15, 1841) was a merchant, ship builder and political figure in Nova Scotia. He represented Hants County from 1836 to 1840 and Windsor township from 1840 to 1841 in the Nova Scotia House of Assembly as a Reformer.

He was born in Halifax, Nova Scotia, the son of Alexander Goudge and Sarah Power. In 1826, he married Elizabeth McHeffey. Goudge was involved in the trade in gypsum at Windsor. In 1834, he was part of a group of merchants petitioning for Windsor to become a free port so that ships carrying imported goods could enter the province there and pay the required duties. Goudge died in office at the age of 36 by drowning at Windsor while sailing to his shipyard.

His son Monson Henry later served in the House of Commons of Canada.
