= Eileen Goudge =

Eileen Goudge (pseudonyms Marian Woodruff and Elizabeth Merrit; born July 4, 1950, San Mateo, California) is an American author notable for her diverse literary contributions spanning romance, historical fiction, and children's literature. Her first novel for adults, Garden of Lies (1989), was a New York Times Best Seller.

== List of adult novels ==
- Garden of Lies, Viking, 1989
- Such Devoted Sisters, Viking, 1992
- Blessing in Disguise, Viking, 1994
- Trail of Secrets, Viking, 1996
- Thorns of Truth, Penguin, 1998
- One Last Dance, Viking Penguin, 1999
- The Second Silence, Viking, 2000
- Otherwise Engaged, Pocket Books, 2005
- Immediate Family, Pocket Books, 2006
