= Windsor, Nova Scotia =

Windsor
- Community
- Seal Coat of arms
- Nickname: Birthplace of Hockey
- Motto: "E Terra Abundantia" (Latin) "From the Land, Abundance"
- Location within Nova Scotia
- Coordinates: 44°58′49″N 64°7′45″W
- Country: Canada
- Province: Nova Scotia
- Municipality: West Hants Regional Municipality
- Founded: 1685
- Incorporated: April 4, 1878
- Amalgamated: April 1, 2020

Government
  - MLA: Melissa Sheehy-Richard (PC)
  - MP: Kody Blois (L)

Area (2016)
  - Community: 9.11 km^{2} (3.52 sq mi)
  - Urban: 10.56 km^{2} (4.08 sq mi)
- Highest elevation: 32 m (105 ft)
- Lowest elevation: 0 m (0 ft)

Population (2021)
  - Community: 3,425
  - Density: 376/km^{2} (974/sq mi)
  - Urban: 5,514
  - Urban density: 522.2/km^{2} (1,352/sq mi)
- Time zone: UTC-4 (AST)
- Postal code: B0N 2T0
- Area code: 902
- Telephone Exchanges: 306 321 472 788 790 791 792 798 799
- Median Earnings^{*}: $54,800
- NTS Map: 21A16 Windsor
- GNBC Code: CBPAK
- ^{*}Median household income, 2020 ($) (all households)

Windsor is a community located in Hants County, Nova Scotia, Canada. It is a service centre for the western part of the county and is situated on Highway 101.

The community has a history dating back to its use by the Mi'kmaq Nation for several millennia prior to European colonization. When the Acadians lived in the area, the town was raided by New England forces in 1704. The area was central to both Father Le Loutre's War and the Expulsion of the Acadians during the Bay of Fundy Campaign in 1755. The town promotes itself as the birthplace of ice hockey and was the home of Canada's first internationally best-selling author, Thomas Chandler Haliburton.

On April 1, 2020, the Town of Windsor amalgamated with the District of West Hants to become the West Hants Regional Municipality.

== History ==
Having migrated from Port Royal, Nova Scotia, the Acadians were the first Europeans to settle in Pisiguit by the early 1680s. French census records dated 1686 list well established farms utilizing dyked marshlands.

=== Queen Anne's War ===
==== Raid on Pisiquid (1704) ====
During Queen Anne's War, in response to the Wabanaki Confederacy of Acadia military campaign against the New England frontier and the Canadian Raid on Deerfield, Massachusetts, Benjamin Church led the Raid on Pisiquid (1704) and burned the village to the ground. In the Raid on Pisiquid, Church burned 40 houses along with out-buildings, crops and cattle. There was resistance and two Mi'kmaq were wounded.

=== Father Le Loutre's War ===
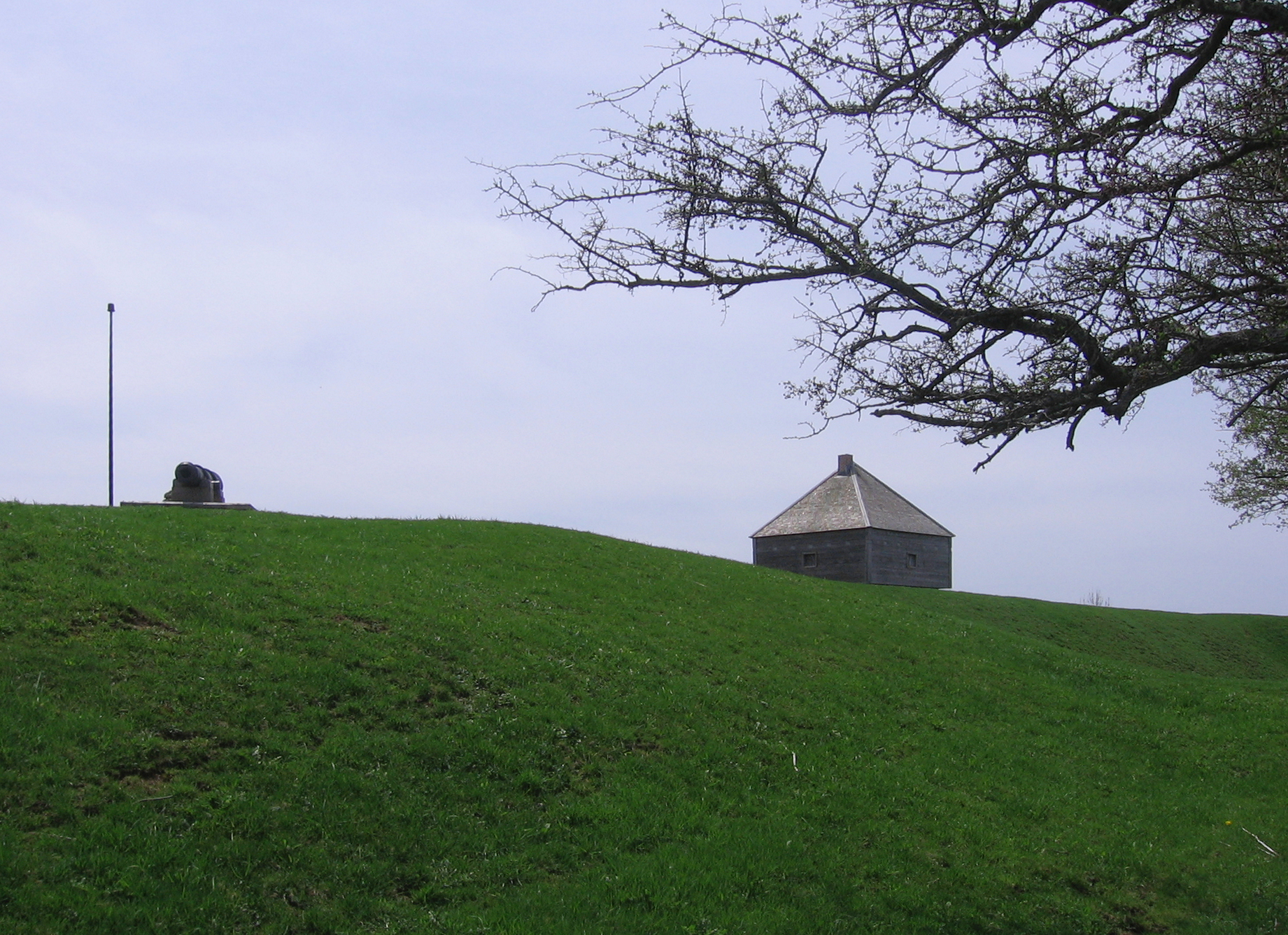
Fort Edward - oldest remaining blockhouse in North America (established during Father Le Loutre's War)

Despite the British conquest of Acadia in 1710, Nova Scotia remained primarily inhabited by the Acadians and Mi'kmaq. Father Le Loutre's War began when Edward Cornwallis arrived to establish Halifax with 13 transports on June 21, 1749. The founding of Halifax was perceived by many Mi'kmaq as "a breach of the peace terms of 1725 (after Dummer's War), which created a framework for negotiating such settlements". The British quickly began to build other settlements. To guard against Mi'kmaq, Acadian and French attacks on the new Protestant settlements, British fortifications were erected in Halifax (1749), Dartmouth (1750), Bedford (Fort Sackville) (1751), Lunenburg (1753) and Lawrencetown (1754).

Within 18 months of establishing Halifax, the British also took firm control of peninsula Nova Scotia by building fortifications in all the major Acadian communities: present-day Windsor (Fort Edward); Grand Pre (Fort Vieux Logis) and Chignecto (Fort Lawrence). (A British fort already existed at the other major Acadian centre of Annapolis Royal, Nova Scotia. Cobequid remained without a fort.) Many Acadians left this region in the Acadian Exodus, which preceded the Expulsion of the Acadians.

=== French and Indian War ===
During the French and Indian War, Fort Edward played a significant role in the deportation of the Acadians, particularly the Bay of Fundy campaign. Acadians were imprisoned in the fort after being notified about the expulsion. Several thousand Acadians were deported from mainland Nova Scotia, including from Fort Edward.

=== New England Planters ===
The Township of Windsor was founded in 1764 by New England Planters. The next year, its first Agricultural Fair was held. This fair is still continued today, and is the oldest and longest-running such fair in North America.

=== American Revolution ===
In the American Revolution, Windsor was an important British stronghold. Fort Edward was the headquarters in Atlantic Canada for 84th Regiment of Foot (Royal Highland Emigrants). A relief force was mustered at Windsor to defeat the Americans at the Battle of Fort Cumberland in 1776.

=== Loyalists ===
Following the American Revolution, Windsor was settled by United Empire Loyalists.

=== Plaster War ===
Windsor developed its gypsum deposits, usually selling it to American markets at Passamaquoddy Bay. Often this trade was illegal; in 1820, an effort to stop this smuggling trade resulted in the "Plaster War," in which local smugglers resoundingly defeated the efforts of New Brunswick officials to bring the trade under their control.

=== Kings ===
The University of King's College and its secondary school, King's Collegiate School, were founded in 1788-1789 by United Empire Loyalists as Anglican academic institutions. The college remained in the community until a disastrous fire on February 3, 1920. In 1922 it moved to Halifax, with the assistance of the Carnegie Foundation and continues to this day.

The King's Collegiate School continued operation on the campus and was joined by a sister girls school, 'Edgehill School', in 1890. In 1976 both institutions merged to form King's-Edgehill School, and remains the oldest independent (i.e. private) school in the Commonwealth outside of the United Kingdom.

=== Haliburton ===
Thomas Chandler Haliburton brought fame to Windsor during the 19th century with his writings about a clockmaker named Sam Slick.

=== Ships, rail and roads ===
In 1878, Windsor was officially incorporated as a town. Its harbour made the town a centre for shipping and shipbuilding during the age of sail. Notable shipbuilders such as Bennett Smith built a large fleet of merchant vessels, one of the last being the ship Black Watch. As the port of registry for the massive wooden shipbuilding industry of the Minas Basin, Windsor was the homeport of one of the largest fleet of sailing ships in Canada. Notable vessels registered at Windsor included Hamburg, the largest three masted barque built in Canada, and Kings County, the largest four masted barque.

Following the completion of the Nova Scotia Railway's line from Halifax in 1857, the town became an important steamship connection giving Halifax access to the Bay of Fundy shipping routes. The railway continued westward as the Windsor and Annapolis Railway in 1870, eventually connecting to Yarmouth as the Dominion Atlantic Railway in 1893.

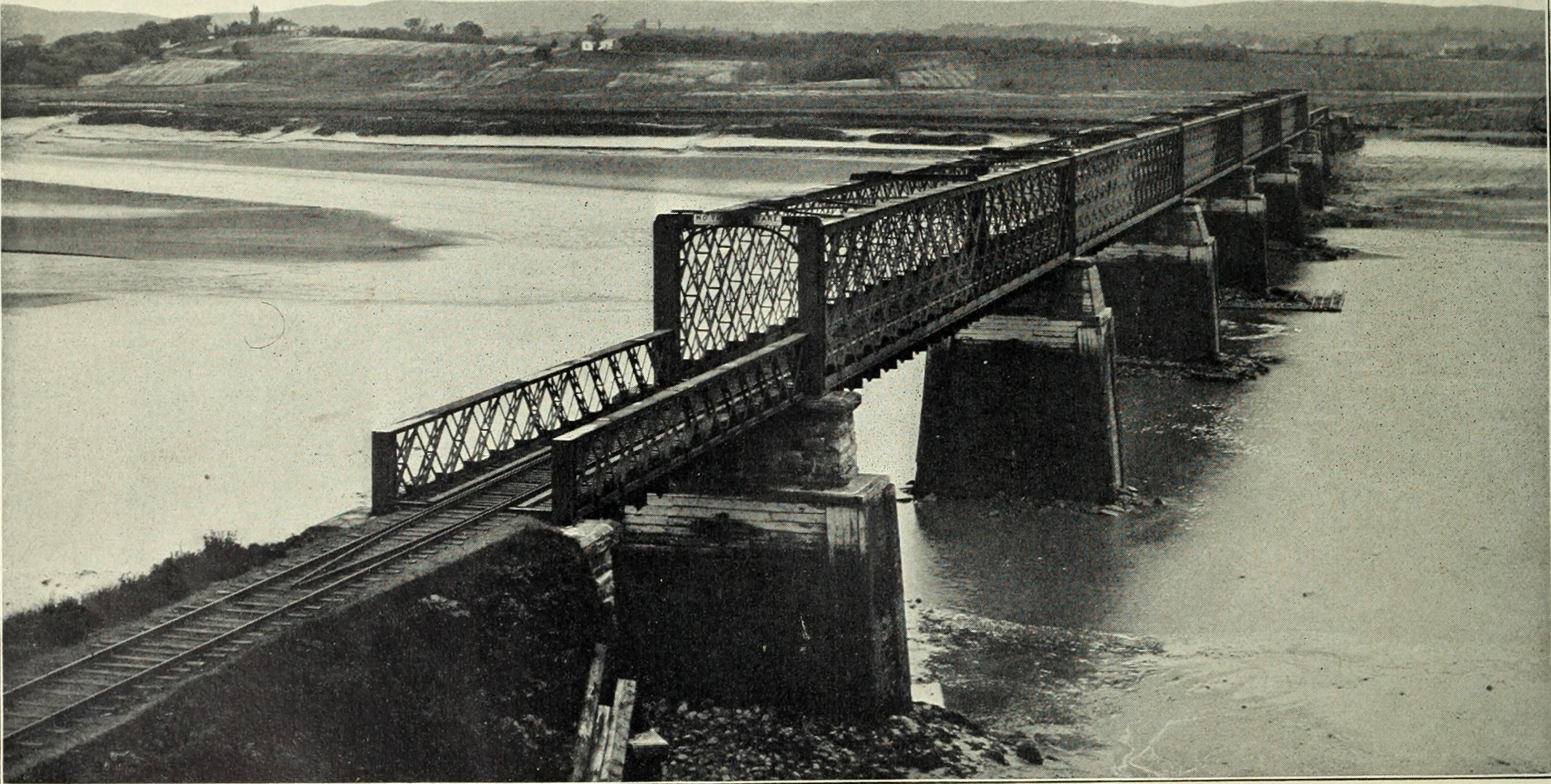
Railway bridge over the Avon River, 1897

Windsor was victim to a disastrous fire on October 17, 1897 which destroyed about eighty percent of the downtown and displaced about 2,500 people. Rebuilding took several years.

In 1901 the Midland Railway was built across Hants County, connecting Windsor with Truro. The central location of Windsor on the railway fostered the growth of numerous factories such as textile mills, fertilizer plants and furniture factories. The home of one of the industrialist families of this era, the Shands, is preserved today in Windsor as the Shand House Museum.

Windsor was affected by another major fire on 6 January 1924, which destroyed part of the town.

The Windsor and Hantsport Railway took over operations from the Dominion Atlantic in 1993, making Windsor its headquarters. Rail service continued until 2011 when a crash in the gypsum market ended gypsum shipments and the railway was mothballed.

In 1970, the construction of a flood-control causeway carrying Highway 101 and the Dominion Atlantic Railway across the Avon River closed Windsor off from shipping and has affected navigation in the Avon River downstream from the causeway due to excessive siltation. Highway 101 is scheduled to be upgraded to a 4-lane expressway in the future and there have been discussions about replacing the causeway with railroad and highway bridges to improve water flow. Today, the Avon River on the upstream side of the causeway which is obstructed from freely flowing into the Bay of Fundy is called 'Lake Pisiquid'.

== Geography ==
Situated at the junction of the Avon and St. Croix Rivers, it is the largest community in the District of the Municipality of West Hants and had a 2001 population of = 3,779 residents. Prior to the county being divided into separate municipal districts, Windsor had served as the shire town of the county. The region encompassing present day Windsor was originally part of Pisiguit, a Mi'kmaq term meaning "Junction of Waters". This name referred to the confluence of the Avon and St. Croix rivers, which flow into the Minas Basin.

=== Climate ===
The highest temperature ever recorded in Windsor was 37.8 °C (100 °F) on 19 August 1935. The coldest temperature ever recorded was −32.5 °C (−26.5 °F) on 7 February 1993.

Climate data for Windsor (Martock), 1981–2010 normals, extremes 1871–2005
| Month | Jan | Feb | Mar | Apr | May | Jun | Jul | Aug | Sep | Oct | Nov | Dec | Year |
|---|---|---|---|---|---|---|---|---|---|---|---|---|---|
| Record high °C (°F) | 18.5 (65.3) | 19.5 (67.1) | 27.0 (80.6) | 28.5 (83.3) | 34.0 (93.2) | 35.6 (96.1) | 35.0 (95.0) | 37.8 (100.0) | 34.0 (93.2) | 30.0 (86.0) | 22.0 (71.6) | 17.5 (63.5) | 37.8 (100.0) |
| Mean daily maximum °C (°F) | −1.0 (30.2) | 0.2 (32.4) | 4.0 (39.2) | 10.1 (50.2) | 17.1 (62.8) | 22.1 (71.8) | 25.5 (77.9) | 25.1 (77.2) | 20.6 (69.1) | 14.2 (57.6) | 8.0 (46.4) | 2.4 (36.3) | 12.4 (54.3) |
| Daily mean °C (°F) | −5.5 (22.1) | −4.4 (24.1) | −0.6 (30.9) | 5.3 (41.5) | 11.3 (52.3) | 16.2 (61.2) | 19.9 (67.8) | 19.5 (67.1) | 15.2 (59.4) | 9.4 (48.9) | 4.2 (39.6) | −1.6 (29.1) | 7.4 (45.3) |
| Mean daily minimum °C (°F) | −9.9 (14.2) | −9.1 (15.6) | −5.2 (22.6) | 0.4 (32.7) | 5.5 (41.9) | 10.3 (50.5) | 14.2 (57.6) | 13.9 (57.0) | 9.8 (49.6) | 4.6 (40.3) | 0.3 (32.5) | −5.6 (21.9) | 2.4 (36.3) |
| Record low °C (°F) | −29.4 (−20.9) | −32.5 (−26.5) | −23.9 (−11.0) | −13.9 (7.0) | −5.0 (23.0) | −2.2 (28.0) | 3.3 (37.9) | 0.0 (32.0) | −2.5 (27.5) | −7.8 (18.0) | −16.7 (1.9) | −25.0 (−13.0) | −32.5 (−26.5) |
| Average precipitation mm (inches) | 147.1 (5.79) | 107.2 (4.22) | 126.1 (4.96) | 103.3 (4.07) | 95.3 (3.75) | 82.8 (3.26) | 83.9 (3.30) | 76.3 (3.00) | 105.6 (4.16) | 108.8 (4.28) | 143.6 (5.65) | 129.7 (5.11) | 1,309.6 (51.56) |
| Average rainfall mm (inches) | 71.9 (2.83) | 54.6 (2.15) | 83.2 (3.28) | 88.6 (3.49) | 93.7 (3.69) | 82.8 (3.26) | 83.9 (3.30) | 76.3 (3.00) | 105.9 (4.17) | 108.8 (4.28) | 127.0 (5.00) | 84.0 (3.31) | 1,060.2 (41.74) |
| Average snowfall cm (inches) | 75.2 (29.6) | 52.6 (20.7) | 42.9 (16.9) | 14.7 (5.8) | 1.6 (0.6) | 0.0 (0.0) | 0.0 (0.0) | 0.0 (0.0) | 0.0 (0.0) | 0.0 (0.0) | 16.6 (6.5) | 45.7 (18.0) | 249.4 (98.2) |
Source: Environment Canada

== Demographics ==
Historical population
| Year | Pop. | ±% |
|---|---|---|
| 1881 | 2,559 | — |
| 1891 | 2,838 | +10.9% |
| 1901 | 3,398 | +19.7% |
| 1911 | 3,452 | +1.6% |
| 1921 | 2,946 | −14.7% |
| 1931 | 3,032 | +2.9% |
| 1941 | 3,436 | +13.3% |
| 1951 | 3,439 | +0.1% |
| 1956 | 3,651 | +6.2% |
| 1961 | 3,823 | +4.7% |
| 1981 | 3,646 | −4.6% |
| 1986 | 3,665 | +0.5% |
| 1991 | 3,625 | −1.1% |
| 1996 | 3,726 | +2.8% |
| 2001 | 3,778 | +1.4% |
| 2006 | 3,709 | −1.8% |
| 2011 | 3,785 | +2.0% |
| 2016 | 3,648 | −3.6% |
| 2021 | 3,425 | −6.1% |

In the 2021 Census of Population conducted by Statistics Canada, the Former Town of Windsor recorded a population of 3,425 living in 1,556 of its 1,679 total private dwellings, a change of −6.1% from its 2016 population of 3,648. With a land area of 9.11 km^{2} (3.52 sq mi), it had a population density of 400.4/km^{2} (1,037.1/sq mi) in 2016

== Arts and culture ==
The world's very first pumpkin regatta was held in Windsor in 1999 where people carve out The Giant Pumpkins and race across lake Pisiquid. This weird regatta now includes a motorized class where a motor is attached to the pumpkin with a flotation device.

Windsor is the location of the Mermaid Theatre of Nova Scotia. The theatre supports a touring troupe, which performs locally and internationally, as well as many children's theatre programs.

== Attractions ==
Windsor, NS is home to numerous attractions beginning with the claim to being the birthplace of hockey. Windsor is home to both the Cradle of Hockey which is home to Long Pond where hockey began beside Howard Dill's Farm. The town of Windsor is also home to the oldest agricultural fair in North America which is held on two separate weekends in September. The first fair was held in Windsor in the year 1765 making their 250th anniversary in 2015.

=== Parks ===
- Falls Lake Provincial Park
- Victoria Park
- Windsor Playland Park
- Windsor Waterfront Skatepark

=== Ice hockey ===
Windsor maintains a claim as the birthplace of hockey, based upon a reference (in a novel by Thomas Haliburton) of boys from King's Collegiate School playing "hurley", on the frozen waters of Long Pond adjacent to the school's campus during the early 19th century. Students from King's-Edgehill School still play hockey on Long Pond, a pond proclaimed by some as the "Cradle of Hockey", located at the farm of Howard Dill. Windsor also boasts the oldest hockey arena in Canada, the Stannus Street Rink, which no longer hosts hockey games. The town's current arena is Hants Exhibition Arena. The town was also involved in the shooting of a television series called Road Hockey Rumble. The town of Windsor was also home to the historic Windsor Royals Jr. B Hockey Club, as well as the Avon River Rats Jr. C Hockey Club. The Windsor Royals Jr. B club ceased playing in the spring of 2012, but was ultimately replaced by the Valley Maple Leafs. Facing issues regarding their copyright, in June 2018 the River Rats revived the Royals brand. However, the newly named team lasted just one season before relocating to Chester, Nova Scotia as the Castaways.

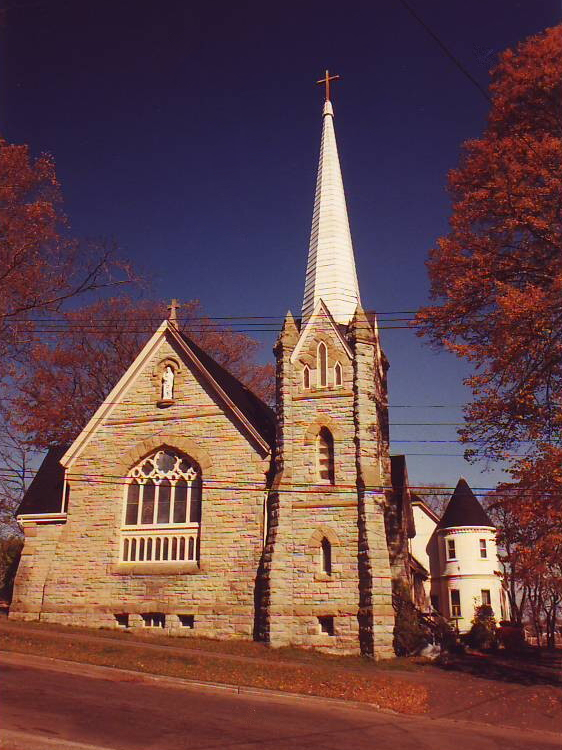
St. John's Roman Catholic Church, designed by William Critchlow Harris

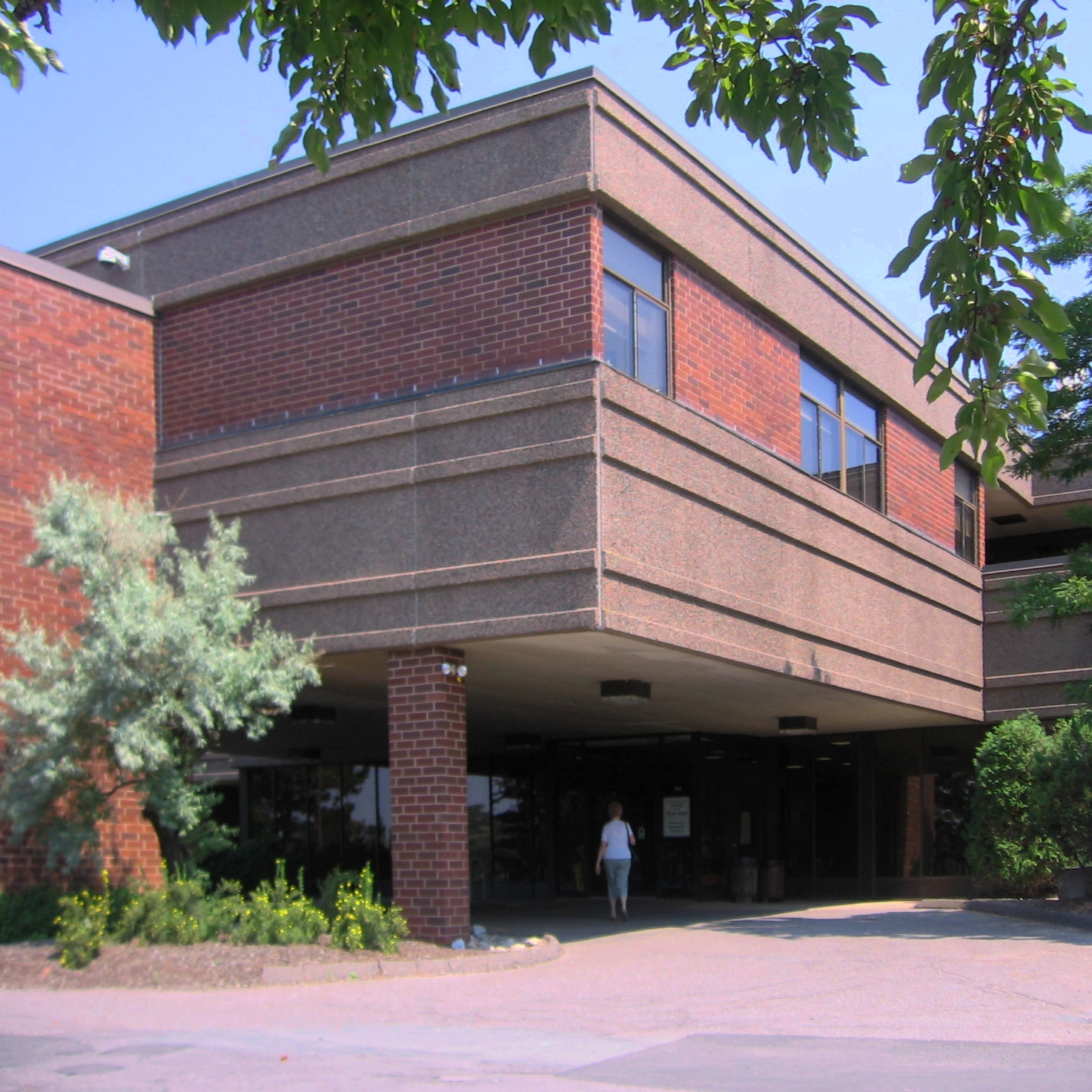
Hants Community Hospital

== Government ==
The town operates under a Council/Manager system of local government consisting of current elected Mayor Anna Allen, current Deputy Mayor Laurie Murley, three elected Councillors, Dave Sealey, Liz Galbraith, and John Bergante and a Chief Administrative Officer, Louis Coutinho.

== Notable people ==
- Thomas R. Bennett
- Scott Brison
- George Elliott Clarke
- Rufus Curry
- Amor De Cosmos
- Benjamin DeWolf (Windsor merchant)
- George Henry Emerson (Twillingate and Fogo)
- James Fraser (businessman)
- Henry Goudge
  - Monson Henry Goudge (son)
- Allen Haley
- Thomas Chandler Haliburton
- Lewis Herbert Martell
- Richard McHeffy
- Alden Nowlan (from nearby Stanley, Nova Scotia)
- Percy Paris
- Daniel McNeill Parker
- Chuck Porter
- Silas Tertius Rand
- Gerald Regan
- Geoff Regan
- Avon Saxon
- Jennifer Rosanne States
- Charlotte Elizabeth Tonna
- Peter Togni
- Benjamin Wier (nearby Brooklyn)
- Charles Smith Wilcox
- Lewis Morris Wilkins (speaker)
  - Lewis Morris Wilkins (son)

== Sister city ==
The sister city of Windsor is Cooperstown, New York. This is due to Windsor being the birthplace of ice hockey and Cooperstown being the birthplace of baseball.

== See also ==
- List of municipalities in Nova Scotia
- King's-Edgehill School
- University of King's College
- The Hants Journal
