= Avard =

Avard may refer to:

== People ==
=== Personal name ===
- Avard Longley Davidson, Canadian politician
- Avard Fairbanks, American sculptor
- Avard Longley, Canadian politician
- Avard Moncur, Bahamian athlete

=== Surname ===
- François Avard, Canadian television writer
- Sampson Avard, American Mormon splinter group leader

== Place ==
- Avard, Oklahoma
