= Archibald McLelan =

Canadian politician (1824-1890)

The Honourable Archibald McLelan PC
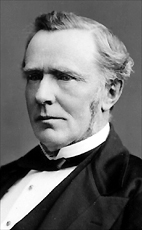
- The Hon. Archibald McLelan

6th Lieutenant Governor of Nova Scotia
- In office 9 July 1888 – 26 June 1890
- Monarch: Victoria
- Governor General: The Lord Stanley of Preston
- Premier: William S. Fielding
- Preceded by: Matthew Henry Richey
- Succeeded by: Malachy Bowes Daly

Personal details
- Born: Archibald Woodbury McLelan; 20 December 1824 Londonderry, Nova Scotia, Canada
- Died: 26 June 1890 (aged 65) Halifax, Nova Scotia
- Party: Anti-Confederate; Liberal-Conservative
- Spouse: Caroline Metzler (m. 1842)
- Relations: Gloud Wilson McLelan (father)
- Education: Mount Allison University
- Occupation: lumber merchant and shipbuilder
- Profession: Politician
- Cabinet: Presidents of the Privy Council (1881–1882); Ministers of Marine and Fisheries (1882–1885); Minister of Finance (1885–1887); Postmaster General (1887–1888)

Archibald Woodbury McLelan PC (20 December 1824 – 26 June 1890) was a Canadian shipbuilder and politician, the sixth Lieutenant Governor of Nova Scotia.

McLelan was born in Londonderry, Nova Scotia, the son of member of the Nova Scotia House of Assembly member Gloud Wilson McLelan. Archibald McLelan was educated in Great Village and joined his father's shipping and retail business. On his father's death in 1858 he succeeded him in the House of Assembly.

Strongly opposed to confederation with Canada, McLelan was elected as the first federal member of parliament for Colchester as an Anti-Confederate.

He reconciled himself to Confederation and was summoned to the Senate of Canada in 1869 where he sat as a Liberal-Conservative.

He resigned from the Upper House to run again for the House of Commons of Canada in an 1881 by-election and was returned to parliament as a Conservative.

McLelan served from 10 December 1885–26 January 1887 as the Minister of Finance in the second administration of Sir John A. Macdonald.

In 1842, he married Caroline Metzler. McLelan died in Halifax at the age of 65.

== Electoral record ==
1867 Canadian federal election: Colchester
Party	Candidate	Votes	%
Anti-Confederation	Archibald McLelan	1,649	56.13
Liberal–Conservative	Adams George Archibald	1,289	43.87
Total valid votes		2,938	–
Source: Library of Parliament

1872 Canadian federal election: Colchester
Party	Candidate	Votes	%	±%
Liberal	Frederick M. Pearson	1,634	57.47	–
Unknown	J.F. Blanchard	1,209	42.53	–
Total valid votes		2,843	–	
Source: Library of Parliament

By-election on 18 June 1881 On Thomas McKay's resignation in June 1881
Party	Candidate	Votes
Conservative	Archibald McLelan	1,802
Independent	Charles N. Cummings	1,374

1882 Canadian federal election: Colchester
Party	Candidate	Votes	%	±%
Conservative	Archibald McLelan	1,887	56.51	+0.79
Unknown	Frederick Andrew Laurence	1,452	43.49	-0.79
Total valid votes		3,339	–	
Source: Library of Parliament

1887 Canadian federal election: Colchester
Party	Candidate	Votes	%	±%
Conservative	Archibald McLelan	2,446	57.35	+0.84
Liberal	Samuel David McLellan	1,819	42.65	-0.84
Total valid votes		4,265	–	
Source: Library of Parliament

By-election on 27 October 1887 On Mr. McLelan being un-seated for bribery by agents
Party	Candidate	Votes
Conservative	Archibald McLelan	2,137
Liberal	Samuel David McLelland	1,511

Parliament of Canada
Preceded by None	Member of Parliament for Colchester; 1867–1869	Succeeded by Adams George Archibald
Preceded by Thomas McKay	Member of Parliament for Colchester; 1881–1888	Succeeded by Adams George Archibald
