= Annapolis (federal electoral district) =

Former federal electoral district in Nova Scotia, Canada

Nova Scotia electoral district

Defunct federal electoral district
- Legislature: House of Commons
- District created: 1867
- District abolished: 1914
- First contested: 1867
- Last contested: 1911

Demographics
- Census division: Annapolis

Annapolis was a federal electoral district in Nova Scotia, Canada, that was represented in the House of Commons of Canada from 1867 to 1917. The district was created in the British North America Act, 1867. It was abolished in 1914 when it was redistributed into Digby and Annapolis. It consisted of Annapolis County, Nova Scotia.

== Geography ==
This riding was set by the British North America Act, 1867 to consist of Annapolis County. The boundaries were not changed during the electoral redistributions of 1872, 1882, 1892 or 1903. This riding was dissolved into Digby and Annapolis in the 1914 electoral redistribution. The county was legally defined in 1837 as such:

...to comprehend and comprise all that part of the present County of Annapolis to the Eastward of a line to pass through the centre of the Gut of Annapolis and from a line to be drawn from the same to the centre of Bear River, and from thence to be continued southwardly, following the course of the same River, to the head of the tide, and thence following a line South twenty four degrees East to the boundary of Queen's County, and containing the Townships of Annapolis, Granville and Wilmot, and so much of the Township of Clements as lies to the Eastward of Bear River, and of the aforesaid line; and also, all other parts of the County of Annapolis to the Eastward of the same line, and not included in any Township.

== Members of Parliament ==
Annapolis
Parliament	Years	Member	Party
1st	1867–1869 (Note: The Anti-Confederation Party dissolved in 1869, and William Hallett Ray joined the Liberal Party.)	William Hallett Ray	Anti-Confederation
1st	1869–1872	William Hallett Ray	Liberal
2nd	1872–1874	William Hallett Ray	Liberal
3rd	1874–1878	William Hallett Ray	Liberal
4th	1878–1882	Avard Longley	Conservative
5th	1882–1887	William Hallett Ray	Liberal
6th	1887–1891	John B. Mills	Conservative
7th	1891–1896	John B. Mills	Conservative
8th	1896–1900	John B. Mills	Conservative
9th	1900–1904	Fletcher Bath Wade	Liberal
10th	1904–1908	Samuel Walter Willet Pickup	Liberal
11th	1908–1911	Samuel Walter Willet Pickup	Liberal
12th	1911–1917	Avard Longley Davidson	Conservative
Riding dissolved into Digby and Annapolis (1917–1935)

== Election results ==
=== 1911 ===
1911 Canadian federal election
Party	Candidate	Votes	%	±%
Conservative	Avard Longley Davidson	2,131	50.15	+2.77
Liberal	Samuel Walter Willet Pickup	2,118	49.85	-2.77
Total valid votes		4,249	–	
Source: Library of Parliament

=== 1908 ===
1908 Canadian federal election
Party	Candidate	Votes	%	±%
Liberal	Samuel Walter Willet Pickup	2,121	52.62	-0.26
Conservative	George E. Corbitt	1,910	47.38	+0.26
Total valid votes		4,031	–	
Source: Library of Parliament

=== 1904 ===
1904 Canadian federal election
Party	Candidate	Votes	%	±%
Liberal	Samuel Walter Willet Pickup	2,013	52.88	+0.80
Conservative	Lawrence D. Shaffner	1,794	47.12	-0.80
Total valid votes		3,807	–	
Source: Library of Parliament

=== 1900 ===
1900 Canadian federal election
Party	Candidate	Votes	%	±%
Liberal	Fletcher Bath Wade	1,883	52.07	+4.65
Conservative	John Burpee Mills	1,733	47.93	-4.65
Total valid votes		3,616	–	
Source: Library of Parliament

=== 1896 ===
1896 Canadian federal election
Party	Candidate	Votes	%	±%
Conservative	John Burpee Mills	2,012	52.57	+0.10
Liberal	James Wilberforce Longley	1,815	47.43	–
Total valid votes		3,827	–	
Source: Library of Parliament

=== 1891 ===
1891 Canadian federal election
Party	Candidate	Votes	%	±%
Conservative	John Burpee Mills	1,835	52.47	+2.07
Unknown	William A. Chipman	1,662	47.53	–
Total valid votes		3,497	–	
Source: Library of Parliament

=== 1887 ===
1887 Canadian federal election
Party	Candidate	Votes	%	±%
Conservative	John Burpee Mills	1,758	50.40	–
Liberal	William Hallett Ray	1,730	49.60	-1.51
Total valid votes		3,488	–	
Source: Library of Parliament

=== 1882 ===
1882 Canadian federal election
Party	Candidate	Votes	%	±%
Liberal	William Hallett Ray	1,430	51.11	+1.17
Unknown	Robert E. FitzRandolph	1,368	48.89	–
Total valid votes		2,798	–	
Source: Library of Parliament

=== 1878 ===
1878 Canadian federal election
Party	Candidate	Votes	%	±%
Conservative	Avard Longley	1,301	50.06	–
Liberal	William Hallett Ray	1,298	49.94	-30.02
Total valid votes		2,599	–	
Source: Library of Parliament

=== 1874 ===
1874 Canadian federal election
Party	Candidate	Votes	%	±%
Liberal	William Hallett Ray	878	79.96	+27.40
Unknown	T.W. Chesley	220	20.04	–
Total valid votes		1,098	–	
Source: Library of Parliament

=== 1872 ===
1872 Canadian federal election
Party	Candidate	Votes	%	±%
Liberal	William Hallett Ray	1,129	52.56	-0.98
Conservative	Avard Longley	1,019	47.44	+0.98
Total valid votes		2,148	–	
Source: Library of Parliament

=== 1867 ===
1867 Canadian federal election
Party	Candidate	Votes	%
Anti-Confederation	William Hallett Ray	1,171	53.54
Conservative	Avard Longley	1,016	46.46
Total valid votes		2,187	–
This electoral district was created by the British North America Act, 1867 from the colonial Province of Nova Scotia'a Annapolis electoral district. Both Avard Longley and William Hallett Ray were incumbents, along with George Whitman.
Source: Library of Parliament

== See also ==
- List of Canadian electoral districts
- Historical federal electoral districts of Canada
