= William Hallett Ray =

Canadian politician

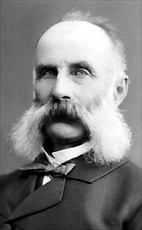

Member of the Canadian Parliament for Annapolis
- In office 1867–1878
- Preceded by: Electoral district established
- Succeeded by: Avard Longley
- In office 1882–1887
- Preceded by: Avard Longley
- Succeeded by: John B. Mills

Personal details
- Born: May 25, 1825 Clementsport, Nova Scotia
- Died: May 7, 1909 (aged 83) Clementsport, Nova Scotia, Canada
- Party: Anti-Confederate (September 20, 1867-January 29, 1869), Liberal (January 30, 1869-)
- Occupation: farmer, merchant

William Hallett Ray (May 25, 1825 – May 7, 1909) was a Canadian politician, farmer, and merchant.

Born in Clementsport, Annapolis Valley, where he worked as a farmer and a merchant, Ray was elected to the Nova Scotia House of Assembly for Annapolis County in an 1864 by-election held after James William Johnston was named to the bench. He was first elected to represent the Annapolis electoral district in the House of Commons of Canada on September 20, 1867, and remained in office until his defeat in September 1878. Ray was re-elected for one more term in the June 1882 elections. He was a member of the Anti-Confederation Party until January 1869, when he left it for the Liberal Party. In 1887, Ray was named to the Legislative Council of Nova Scotia.

He married Henrietta Ditmars in 1848. Ray also served as lieutenant-colonel in the county militia.

He died in Clementsport at the age of 83.

== Election results ==
1867 Canadian federal election: Annapolis
Party	Candidate	Votes	%
Anti-Confederation	William Hallett Ray	1,171	53.54
Conservative	Avard Longley	1,016	46.46
Total valid votes		2,187	–
This electoral district was created by the British North America Act, 1867 from the colonial Province of Nova Scotia'a Annapolis electoral district. Both Avard Longley and William Hallett Ray were incumbents, along with George Whitman.
Source: Library of Parliament

1872 Canadian federal election: Annapolis
Party	Candidate	Votes	%	±%
Liberal	William Hallett Ray	1,129	52.56	-0.98
Conservative	Avard Longley	1,019	47.44	+0.98
Total valid votes		2,148	–	
Source: Library of Parliament

1874 Canadian federal election: Annapolis
Party	Candidate	Votes	%	±%
Liberal	William Hallett Ray	878	79.96	+27.40
Unknown	T.W. Chesley	220	20.04	–
Total valid votes		1,098	–	
Source: Library of Parliament

1878 Canadian federal election: Annapolis
Party	Candidate	Votes	%	±%
Conservative	Avard Longley	1,301	50.06	–
Liberal	William Hallett Ray	1,298	49.94	-30.02
Total valid votes		2,599	–	
Source: Library of Parliament

1882 Canadian federal election: Annapolis
Party	Candidate	Votes	%	±%
Liberal	William Hallett Ray	1,430	51.11	+1.17
Unknown	Robert E. FitzRandolph	1,368	48.89	–
Total valid votes		2,798	–	
Source: Library of Parliament

1887 Canadian federal election: Annapolis
Party	Candidate	Votes	%	±%
Conservative	John Burpee Mills	1,758	50.40	–
Liberal	William Hallett Ray	1,730	49.60	-1.51
Total valid votes		3,488	–	
Source: Library of Parliament
