= Parliamentary Librarian of Canada =

Librarian position in the Parliament of Canada

The Parliamentary Librarian of Canada is one of the key officials of the Parliament of Canada.

While the Library of Parliament was created shortly after 1867, the role of librarian was not created until 1871 to be in charge of management and control of the library of Parliament. Control and direction of the library is provided by the Speakers of the House of Commons and the Senate.

The current role was created from the merger of the Parliamentary Librarians of the Provinces of Canada (1840-1867) and those of the Legislature of Upper and Lower Canada (1790s).

From its creation until 1956, the parliamentary library was overseen by two officers: the parliamentary librarian, who oversaw the parliamentary archives and research facilities, and the general librarian, who oversaw the non-governmental and historical collections. By convention, one position had to be held by an anglophone and the other by a francophone; in practice the anglophone always held the parliamentary position and the francophone always held the general one, except for a period during World War II when general librarian Felix Desrochers concurrently held the parliamentary position on a de facto basis, as following the death of Martin Burrell in 1938 the House of Commons did not formally appoint a new parliamentary librarian until 1944. However, Desrochers was never formally given the title of parliamentary librarian.

Following the creation of the National Library of Canada in 1953, the general librarian's position was phased out as those responsibilities and materials were transferred to the new institution. With the discontinuation of the general librarian's position, a new position was created for associate librarian, which was also consistently held by a francophone until 1994, when Richard Paré, the incumbent of that position at the time of chief librarian Erik Spicer's retirement, became the first francophone officially named to the top post.

The library provides reference material for use by members of the House of Commons and the Senate, as well as officials of the Parliament of Canada.

== Parliamentary Librarians ==
- Alpheus Todd, 1870-1884 – was assistant librarian in the Library of the Legislative Assembly of Upper Canada (1836-1841) and of the Province of Canada (1841-1854) and Principal Library of the Province of Canada (1854-1867)
- Martin Joseph Griffin, 1885-1920
- Martin Burrell, 1920-1938
- Vacant (Felix Desrochers de facto), 1938-1944
- Francis Aubrey Hardy, 1944-1959
- Erik John Spicer, 1960-1994
- Richard Paré, 1994-2005
- William Robert (Bill) Young, 2005-2011
- Sonia L'Heureux, 2012–2018
- Heather Lank, 2018 to 2024
- Christine Ivory, 2024 to present

== General Librarians ==
- Alfred Duclos DeCelles, 1885-1920
- Joseph de la Broquerie Taché, 1920-1932
- Felix Desrochers, 1933-1956

== Associate Librarians ==
- Guy Sylvestre, 1956-1968
- Gilles Frappier, 1970-1979
- Richard Paré, 1980-1994
- Hugh Finsten, 2002-2007
- Sonia L'Heureux, 2012-2012
- Catherine MacLeod, 2013-2019

== See also ==
- Librarian of Congress
- Procedural officers and senior officials of the Parliament of Canada
- Librarian of the British House of Commons
