= John Stanfield =

Canadian industrialist and politician (1868–1934)

The Honourable John Stanfield

Senator for Colchester, Nova Scotia
- In office February 17, 1921 – January 22, 1934
- Appointed by: Arthur Meighen

Member of the Canadian Parliament for Colchester
- In office November 28, 1907 – December 16, 1917
- Preceded by: Frederick Andrew Laurence
- Succeeded by: Fleming Blanchard McCurdy

Personal details
- Born: May 18, 1868 Charlottetown, Prince Edward Island
- Died: January 22, 1934 (aged 65) Truro, Nova Scotia
- Party: Conservative Party
- Spouse: Sadie Yorston
- Relatives: Frank Stanfield (brother); Robert Lorne Stanfield (nephew); Frank Thomas Stanfield (nephew)
- Military career
- Allegiance: Canada
- Branch: Canadian Army
- Service years: 1917–19
- Rank: Lieutenant
- Units: Colchester and Hants Rifle Corps Reserve
- Commands: Nova Scotia Highland Brigade
- Conflicts: World War I

John Stanfield (May 18, 1868 – January 22, 1934) was an industrialist and Conservative politician in Nova Scotia, Canada, who represented Colchester in both the Canadian House of Commons (1907–17) where he served as Chief Government Whip (1911–17) and the Canadian Senate (1921–34). He was the brother of the politician Frank Stanfield.

== Early life ==
He was born in Charlottetown, Prince Edward Island, the son of Charles E. Stanfield and Lydia Dawson. The family moved to Truro, Nova Scotia while Stanfield was still young, and attended Truro High School. With his brother Frank Stanfield, he took over the operation of his father's woollen mills in 1896; the company was incorporated as Stanfield's Limited in 1906. In 1902, he married Sadie Yorston.

== Career ==
Stanfield represented Colchester in the House of Commons of Canada from 1907 to 1917 as a Conservative member and served as Chief Government Whip from 1911 to 1917 when he retired from the Commons.

He was a Lieutenant in the Colchester and Hants Rifle Corps Reserve and took a battalion overseas during World War I. He was given command of the Nova Scotia Highland Brigade in 1916 but was invalided home in 1917. He was later an Honorary Colonel of the 76th Regiment of the Colchester and Hants Rifle Corps.

Stanfield later sat for Colchester division in the Senate of Canada from 1921 to 1934. He died in Truro, Nova Scotia in 1934 at the age of 65.

== Electoral record ==
By-election on 28 November 1907 On Mr. Laurence being appointed Judge, 4 November 1907
Party	Candidate	Votes
Conservative	John Stanfield	2,586
Liberal	Charles Hill	2,363

1908 Canadian federal election: Colchester
Party	Candidate	Votes	%	±%
Conservative	John Stanfield	2,736	51.07	+2.97
Liberal	Charles Hill	2,621	48.93	-2.97
Total valid votes		5,357	–	
Source: Library of Parliament

1911 Canadian federal election: Colchester
Party	Candidate	Votes	%	±%
Conservative	John Stanfield	2,847	56.38	+5.30
Liberal	Samuel David McLellan	2,203	43.62	-5.30
Total valid votes		5,050	–	
Source: Library of Parliament
