= John Burpee Mills =

Canadian politician

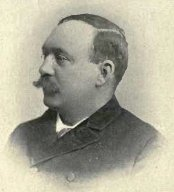

Member of the Canadian Parliament for Annapolis
- In office 1887–1900
- Preceded by: William Hallett Ray
- Succeeded by: Fletcher Bath Wade

Personal details
- Born: 24 July 1850 Granville Ferry, Nova Scotia, British North America
- Died: 28 December 1913 (aged 63) Providence, Rhode Island, U.S.
- Party: Conservative

John Burpee Mills, KC (24 July 1850 – 28 December 1913) was a Canadian lawyer and politician.

Born in Granville Ferry, Nova Scotia, the son of John Mills and Jane McCormick, Mills received a Bachelor of Arts degree in 1871 and a Master of Arts degree in 1877 from Acadia College. He also attended Harvard Law School and was called to the Bar of Nova Scotia in 1875. He was created a Queen's Counsel in 1890. In 1905, he was called to the British Columbia Bar. Miller began the practice of law in Annapolis Royal, Nova Scotia and later practised in Vancouver. He was editor of the Annapolis Spectator.

He was a member from 1882 until 1887 of the municipal council of Annapolis, Nova Scotia. He was first elected to the House of Commons of Canada for the electoral district of Annapolis in the 1887 election. A Conservative, he was re-elected in 1891 and 1896. He was defeated in the 1900 election.

Mills was married twice: first to Bessie B. Corbitt in 1878 and then to Agnes K. Rose in 1896. He died in Providence, Rhode Island at the age of 63.

== Electoral record ==
1887 Canadian federal election: Annapolis
Party	Candidate	Votes	%	±%
Conservative	John Burpee Mills	1,758	50.40	–
Liberal	William Hallett Ray	1,730	49.60	-1.51
Total valid votes		3,488	–	
Source: Library of Parliament

1891 Canadian federal election: Annapolis
Party	Candidate	Votes	%	±%
Conservative	John Burpee Mills	1,835	52.47	+2.07
Unknown	William A. Chipman	1,662	47.53	–
Total valid votes		3,497	–	
Source: Library of Parliament

1896 Canadian federal election: Annapolis
Party	Candidate	Votes	%	±%
Conservative	John Burpee Mills	2,012	52.57	+0.10
Liberal	James Wilberforce Longley	1,815	47.43	–
Total valid votes		3,827	–	
Source: Library of Parliament

1900 Canadian federal election: Annapolis
Party	Candidate	Votes	%	±%
Liberal	Fletcher Bath Wade	1,883	52.07	+4.65
Conservative	John Burpee Mills	1,733	47.93	-4.65
Total valid votes		3,616	–	
Source: Library of Parliament
