= Digby and Annapolis =

Former federal electoral district in Nova Scotia, Canada

Nova Scotia electoral district

Defunct federal electoral district
- Legislature: House of Commons
- District created: 1914
- District abolished: 1933
- First contested: 1917
- Last contested: 1930

Digby and Annapolis was a federal electoral district in the province of Nova Scotia, Canada, that was represented in the House of Commons of Canada from 1917 to 1935.

This riding was created in 1914 from parts of Digby and Annapolis ridings. It consisted of the county of Annapolis and the county of Digby without the municipality of Clare. In 1924, the municipality of Clare was added to the riding, so that it consisted of the counties of Digby and Annapolis. Its name was changed in 1924 to Digby—Annapolis.

The riding was abolished in 1933 when it was divided between Digby—Annapolis—Kings and Shelburne—Yarmouth—Clare ridings.

== Members of Parliament ==
This riding elected the following members of Parliament:

| Parliament | Years | Member | Party |
|---|---|---|---|
Digby and Annapolis; Riding created from Digby and Annapolis
| 13th | 1917–1921 | Avard Longley Davidson | Government (Unionist) |
| 14th | 1921–1925 | Lewis Johnstone Lovett | Liberal |
Digby—Annapolis
| 15th | 1925–1926 | Harry Short | Conservative |
| 16th | 1926–1930 | Harry Short | Conservative |
| 17th | 1930–1935 | Harry Short | Conservative |
Riding dissolved into Digby—Annapolis—Kings and Shelburne—Yarmouth—Clare

== Election results ==
=== 1930 ===
1930 Canadian federal election: Digby—Annapolis
| Party | Candidate | Votes | % | ±% |
|---|---|---|---|---|
| Conservative | Harry Short | 8,357 | 50.23 | -0.74 |
| Liberal | Samuel Pickup | 8,282 | 49.77 | +0.74 |
| Total valid votes | | 16,639 | – | |
Source: Library of Parliament

=== 1926 ===
1926 Canadian federal election: Digby—Annapolis
| Party | Candidate | Votes | % | ±% |
|---|---|---|---|---|
| Conservative | Harry Short | 8,159 | 50.96 | -0.32 |
| Liberal | Lewis Johnstone Lovett | 7,851 | 49.04 | +0.32 |
| Total valid votes | | 16,010 | – | |
Source: Library of Parliament

=== 1925 ===
1925 Canadian federal election: Digby—Annapolis
| Party | Candidate | Votes | % | ±% |
|---|---|---|---|---|
| Conservative | Harry Short | 7,599 | 51.28 | +10.19 |
| Liberal | Lewis Johnstone Lovett | 7,219 | 48.72 | -10.19 |
| Total valid votes | | 14,818 | – | |
Source: Library of Parliament

=== 1921 ===
1921 Canadian federal election
| Party | Candidate | Votes | % | ±% |
|---|---|---|---|---|
| Liberal | Lewis Johnstone Lovett | 7,388 | 58.91 | +13.70 |
| Conservative | Avard Longley Davidson | 5,153 | 41.09 | -13.70 |
| Total valid votes | | 12,541 | – | |
Source: Library of Parliament

=== 1917 ===
1917 Canadian federal election
| Party | Candidate | Votes | % |
|---|---|---|---|
| Government (Unionist) | Avard Longley Davidson | 4,596 | 54.89 |
| Opposition | Lewis Johnstone Lovett | 3,777 | 45.11 |
| Total valid votes | | 8,373 | – |
Source: Library of Parliament

== See also ==
- List of Canadian electoral districts
- Historical federal electoral districts of Canada
