= Avard Longley =

Canadian politician

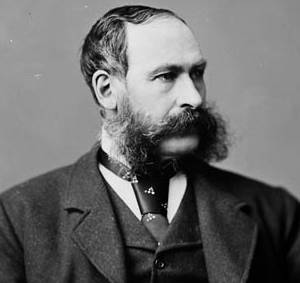

Member of the Canadian Parliament for Annapolis
- In office 1878–1882
- Preceded by: William Hallett Ray
- Succeeded by: William Hallett Ray

Personal details
- Born: February 22, 1823 Paradise, Nova Scotia
- Died: February 22, 1884 (aged 61) Paradise, Nova Scotia
- Party: Conservative

Avard Longley (February 22, 1823 – February 22, 1884) was a farmer, merchant, and politician in Nova Scotia, Canada. He represented Annapolis County in the Nova Scotia House of Assembly from 1859 to 1867 and again from 1874 to 1878, and he represented Annapolis in the House of Commons of Canada from 1878 to 1882 as a Conservative member.

He was born in Paradise, Nova Scotia, the son of Asaph Longley and Dorcas Poole. In 1848, he married Hannah Maria Whitman. Longley married Charlotte Augusta Troop in 1855. Longley was first elected to the assembly in 1859 as a temperance advocate. He was commissioner of railways from 1864 to 1869. Longley helped found the Nova Scotia Fruit Growers' Association and served as its president from 1883 to 1884. He ran unsuccessfully for a federal seat in 1867 and 1872, and he was defeated when he ran for a seat in the provincial assembly in 1871. Longley served on the board of governors for Acadia College from 1874 to 1884. Still a temperance advocate, while in Ottawa, he attempted to have the bar in the House of Commons closed permanently. Longley did not run for reelection in 1882 due to poor health. He died in Paradise at the age of 61.

== Election results ==
1867 Canadian federal election: Annapolis
Party	Candidate	Votes	%
Anti-Confederation	William Hallett Ray	1,171	53.54
Conservative	Avard Longley	1,016	46.46
Total valid votes		2,187	–
This electoral district was created by the British North America Act, 1867 from the colonial Province of Nova Scotia'a Annapolis electoral district. Both Avard Longley and William Hallett Ray were incumbents, along with George Whitman.
Source: Library of Parliament

1872 Canadian federal election: Annapolis
Party	Candidate	Votes	%	±%
Liberal	William Hallett Ray	1,129	52.56	-0.98
Conservative	Avard Longley	1,019	47.44	+0.98
Total valid votes		2,148	–	
Source: Library of Parliament

1878 Canadian federal election: Annapolis
Party	Candidate	Votes	%	±%
Conservative	Avard Longley	1,301	50.06	–
Liberal	William Hallett Ray	1,298	49.94	-30.02
Total valid votes		2,599	–	
Source: Library of Parliament
