= Adams George Archibald =

Canadian Father of Confederation (1814–1892)

The Honourable Sir Adams George Archibald PC KCMG QC
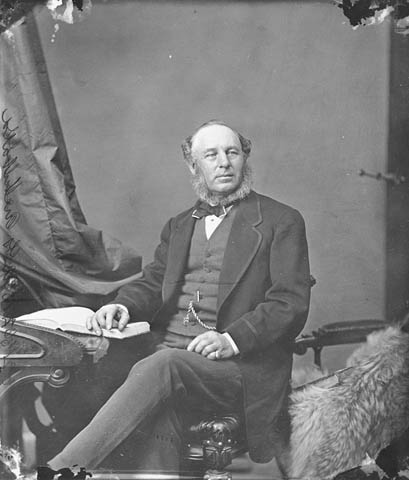

4th Lieutenant Governor of Nova Scotia
- In office July 4, 1873 – July 4, 1883
- Monarch: Victoria
- Governors General: The Earl of Dufferin; Marquess of Lorne
- Premier: William Annand; Philip Carteret Hill; Simon Hugh Holmes; John Thompson; William Thomas Pipes
- Preceded by: Joseph Howe
- Succeeded by: Matthew Henry Richey

1st Lieutenant Governor of Manitoba
- In office May 20, 1870 – December 2, 1872
- Monarch: Victoria
- Governor General: The Lord Lisgar
- Premier: Alfred Boyd; Marc-Amable Girard; Henry Joseph Clarke
- Preceded by: None
- Succeeded by: Alexander Morris

1st Lieutenant Governor of Northwest Territories
- In office May 20, 1870 – December 2, 1872
- Monarch: Victoria
- Governor General: The Lord Lisgar
- Preceded by: None
- Succeeded by: Alexander Morris

Member of Parliament for Colchester
- In office September 9, 1869 – May 19, 1870
- Preceded by: Archibald McLelan
- Succeeded by: Frederick M. Pearson
- In office August 15, 1888 – March 5, 1891
- Preceded by: Archibald McLelan
- Succeeded by: William Albert Patterson

Personal details
- Born: May 3, 1814 Truro, Nova Scotia
- Died: December 14, 1892 (aged 78) Truro, Nova Scotia, Canada
- Party: Reformers; Liberal-Conservative
- Spouse: Elizabeth Archibald Burnyeat (m. 1843)
- Children: 3 daughters, 1 son (died aged 14)
- Father of Confederation

Sir Adams George Archibald PC KCMG QC (May 3, 1814 – December 14, 1892) was a Canadian lawyer and politician, and a Father of Confederation. He was based in Nova Scotia for most of his career, though he also served as first Lieutenant Governor of Manitoba from 1870 to 1872.

Archibald was born in Truro to a prominent family in Nova Scotian politics. He was the son of Samuel Archibald, and grandson of James Archibald, judge of the court of common pleas, Nova Scotia. He was also related to Samuel G. W. Archibald, who had served as the province's Attorney General from 1830 to 1841. Sir Adams Archibald studied science and medicine for a few years, subsequently articled in law, and was called to the Nova Scotia bar in January 1839. He held a number of local offices over the next decade, and was appointed a probate judge in 1848.

== Political career ==
Archibald was elected to the Nova Scotia legislature in 1851 as a supporter of Joseph Howe's governing Reformers, topping the poll in the two-member riding of Colchester County. Once in the legislature, Archibald frequently took positions that were opposed by other members of the Liberal caucus. He supported elected municipal governments, for instance, and was a vociferous proponent of taxation for a state-run school system (regarded by many Nova Scotia Liberals as an unnecessary expense). Archibald also supported reciprocity with the United States, and opposed any efforts to expand the province's electoral franchise.

Archibald was re-elected in 1855, and was appointed Solicitor General of Nova Scotia on August 14, 1856. His term in office was cut short by a sectarian quarrel in the legislature, which occurred after the President of the Charitable Irish Society was dismissed from his government job and charged with treason. The Liberal government had previously been supported by a majority of the province's Catholic population, but in early 1857 eight Catholic Liberals and two Protestant Liberals from Catholic ridings defected to the Conservative opposition, which was then able to form government. Archibald was forced to resign his position on February 21, 1857.

In the provincial election of 1859, Howe's Liberals were returned to office on a platform of defending Protestant interests. This was essentially a cynical appeal to popular prejudice, and no significant actions were taken against the province's Catholics following the election. Archibald did not run, but was nevertheless appointed Attorney General in Howe's government on February 10, 1860. He returned to parliament following a by-election victory on March 8, 1860. In his new capacity, Archibald was a leading proponent of provincial railway development, even following the economic downturn of 1862.

In December 1862, Premier Howe was appointed Imperial Fisheries Commissioner by the British government. Archibald succeeded him as Liberal leader, although Howe continued to serve as Premier until the next election was called.

In early 1863, Howe's outgoing ministry passed a bill which re-introduced property qualifications for voters. The bill did not become law before the provincial election of May 1863, however, and it was largely due to the bill's unpopularity that Archibald's Liberals were dealt a crushing defeat. The party won only 14 seats out of 55, though Archibald was personally re-elected in Colchester South.

Despite serving as leader of the opposition from 1863 to 1867, Archibald frequently sided with the Conservative ministry against his own caucus on important legislative initiatives. He supported the education tax plan put forward by Charles Tupper's government, although it was opposed by most members of his own party. Archibald was later the Nova Scotia Liberal Party's representative to the first conference on Canadian Confederation, held at Charlottetown, Prince Edward Island in 1864. Following the conference, he was the only member of the Liberal caucus to support Nova Scotia's entry into confederation.

Archibald faced a leadership challenge from anti-confederate William Annand in 1866, but emerged victorious. When Nova Scotia joined the new nation of Canada on July 1, 1867, Archibald was appointed Secretary of State for the Provinces in the cabinet of John A. Macdonald.

Nova Scotia's political system was transformed by the debate on Confederation, and its concurrent provincial and federal elections in September 1867 were fought by Confederation and anti-Confederation parties, rather than by Liberals and Conservatives. The Confederation Party suffered a massive defeat, and Archibald (despite spending a very large sum of money) was defeated by Archibald McLelan in the riding of Colchester. He resigned his cabinet post on April 30, 1868.

Popular opinion in Nova Scotia subsequently shifted in favour of Confederation, particularly after one-time anti-confederate Joseph Howe joined Macdonald's government in 1869. McLelan followed Howe to the Confederation side, and was appointed to the Senate in August 1869. This allowed Archibald to run for the riding in a by-election, in which he defeated Liberal Frederick Pearson, 1585 votes to 1230. Archibald was by this time a Liberal-Conservative, and continued to support the Macdonald government in parliament (though he was not re-appointed to cabinet).

In 1870, Archibald gave a speech in favour of conciliation towards the leaders of the Red River Rebellion in Manitoba. This was noticed by George-Étienne Cartier, who was the de facto leader of the Canadian government while Macdonald was recovering from a serious illness. Cartier asked Archibald to become the first Lieutenant Governor of Manitoba and the Northwest Territories. Although he had little interest in the region, he agreed on condition that he be appointed to the Supreme Court of Nova Scotia after serving a single term.

Archibald was sworn into office in August 1870, in Niagara Falls, Ontario. He then travelled to Manitoba, and began piecing together the province's first government. There was considerable antagonism between the province's Métis population and recently arrived soldiers from Ontario, and Archibald had difficulties finding suitable candidates to work with him. Until January 1871, the only members of his cabinet were local merchant Alfred Boyd and Marc-Amable Girard, a recent arrival from Quebec. Archibald himself was the province's de facto Premier, and often determined policy without consulting his ministers.

Despite opposition from many of the province's Anglophones, Archibald was able to settle the province's electoral boundaries by December 1870. Archibald himself was the leader of the government side in the election which followed; the francophone population was mostly united in support of him, while John Christian Schultz led a group of ultra-loyalist Anglophones who opposed the conciliation policy. Archibald was successful, as Schultz's opposition won only five seats and Schultz was personally defeated in Winnipeg and St. John.

Archibald put together a five-member cabinet in January 1871, which included Boyd, Girard, Henry Joseph Clarke, James Mackay and Thomas Howard — a group which balanced the province's ethnic, religious and linguistic divisions. Archibald himself remained the real Premier.

Archibald continued to pursue a policy of conciliation with the province's Métis population, encouraging them to register their lands and even meeting with Louis Riel after an armed Métis band had defended the government against Fenian invaders from America. His real intentions were to prevent another Métis uprising in the short-term, and to allow for the gradual hegemony of new Canadian settlers in the region. Nevertheless, the specifics of his conciliation policy were opposed by Macdonald and Howe alike (Howe was by this time Macdonald's Indian Affairs minister). In the face of this opposition, Archibald submitted his resignation in late 1871. Macdonald initially had difficulty finding a replacement and asked Archibald to reconsider. The federal government chose Francis Godschall Johnson as his replacement on April 9, 1872, but this commission was revoked before Johnson was sworn in. It was not until October 1872 that Archibald returned to Ontario.

Archibald was not immediately appointed to the Nova Scotia court, and was instead made a director of the Canada Pacific Railway Company in February 1873. He was finally appointed to the bench in June, but withdrew days later to be appointed Lieutenant Governor of Nova Scotia (former Conservative Premier James W. Johnston initially received this appointment, but withdrew due to ill health). This position required less intervention than Archibald had exercised in Manitoba, although he attended cabinet meetings in 1873 and 1874. After 1876, he came to regard the position as primarily ceremonial, and above partisan concerns.

Archibald served as the 4th Lieutenant Governor of Nova Scotia until June 1883. In 1886, he became President of the Nova Scotia Historical Society, which he had helped to found six years earlier. He courted controversy by a public defence of the 18th-century Acadian expulsion later in the year. Archibald was also the first historian of Government House (Nova Scotia) and wrote an extensive monograph on the subject.

In 1888, Archibald McLelan was appointed Lieutenant Governor of Nova Scotia. McLelan had resigned his Senate seat in 1881 and subsequently returned to the House of Commons. His appointment meant that the riding of Colchester again became vacant, and ironically, Archibald was again prevailed upon to stand for the riding as a Liberal-Conservative candidate. He was re-elected to the Commons on August 15, 1888, 18 years after his previous departure. Archibald was little involved in the activities of the House following his return, and did not make any speeches. Due to ill health, he did not run again in 1891.

== Family ==
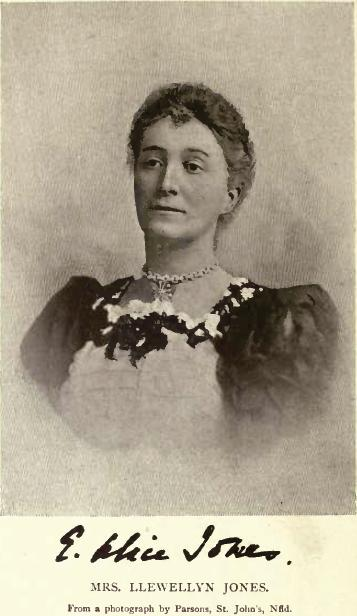
Mrs Elizabeth Alice Jones (née Archibald) by Parsons, St. John's, Nfld

Hon. Sir Adams George Archibald, K.C.M.G., Lieutenant-Governor of Nova Scotia married Elizabeth A. Burnyeat, daughter of Rev. John Burnyeat. Their daughter Elizabeth Alice Archibald and his son Riley Robert Archibald were born and educated in Nova Scotia. They lived in Ottawa, Ontario, with their parents, while their father was a Minister of the Crown for the three years succeeding Confederation. they went with their parents, on their father's appointment as Lieutenant-Governor of Manitoba. In December, 1881, Elizabeth Alice married the Right Reverend Dr. Llewellyn Jones, Bishop of Newfoundland. After the couple's marriage, they lived at Bishopscourt in St. John's, Newfoundland.

== Death ==
Archibald died on December 14, 1892, at the age of 78 of an unknown illness most likely derived from his old age.

== Electoral record ==
1867 Canadian federal election: Colchester
Party	Candidate	Votes	%
Anti-Confederation	Archibald McLelan	1,649	56.13
Liberal–Conservative	Adams George Archibald	1,289	43.87
Total valid votes		2,938	–
Source: Library of Parliament

By-election on 9 September 1869 On Mr. McLellan being called to the Senate, August 1869
Party	Candidate	Votes
Liberal–Conservative	Adams George Archibald	1,585
Liberal	Frederick M. Pearson	1,230
