= Seymour Eugene Gourley =

Canadian politician (1854–1906)

Seymour Eugene Gourley KC

Member of Parliament for Colchester
- In office 1900–1904
- Succeeded by: Frederick Andrew Laurence

Personal details
- Born: 20 December 1854 Brookfield, Nova Scotia, Canada
- Died: 5 January 1906 (aged 51)
- Party: Conservative
- Spouse: H. Rose McLellan (m. 1891)
- Education: Horton Academy, Acadia College
- Occupation: Lawyer, politician
- Profession: Lawyer

Seymour Eugene Gourley, KC (20 December 1854 – 5 January 1906) was a lawyer and political figure in Nova Scotia, Canada. He represented Colchester in the House of Commons of Canada from 1900 to 1904 as a Conservative.

He was born in Brookfield, Nova Scotia, the son of Elisha C. Gourley and Mary Black, and was educated in Brookfield, in Truro, at the Horton Academy and Acadia College. He was admitted to the bar in 1874 and set up practice in Truro. In 1891, Gourley married H. Rose McLellan. He was named a Queen's Counsel in the same year.

== Electoral record ==
1900 Canadian federal election: Colchester
Party	Candidate	Votes	%	±%
Conservative	Seymour Eugene Gourley	2,449	53.02	+1.17
Liberal	Firman McClure	2,170	46.98	-1.17
Total valid votes		4,619	–	
Source: Library of Parliament

1904 Canadian federal election: Colchester
Party	Candidate	Votes	%	±%
Liberal	Frederick Andrew Laurence	2,610	51.90	+4.92
Conservative	Seymour Eugene Gourley	2,419	48.10	-4.92
Total valid votes		5,029	–	
Source: Library of Parliament
