= Colchester (federal electoral district) =

Former federal electoral district in Nova Scotia, Canada

Nova Scotia electoral district

Defunct federal electoral district
- Legislature: House of Commons
- District created: 1867
- District abolished: 1933
- First contested: 1867
- Last contested: 1930

Colchester was a federal electoral district in Nova Scotia, Canada, that was represented in the House of Commons of Canada from 1867 to 1935. It was created in the British North America Act, 1867, and was abolished in 1933 when it was merged into Colchester—Hants riding. The district consisted of the County of Colchester.

== Members of Parliament ==
This riding has elected the following members of Parliament:

Colchester
Parliament	Years	Member	Party
1st	1867–1869	Archibald McLelan	Anti-Confederation
1st	1869–1869	Archibald McLelan	Liberal–Conservative
1st	1869–1870	Adams George Archibald	Liberal–Conservative
1st	1870–1872	Frederick M. Pearson	Liberal
2nd	1872–1874	Frederick M. Pearson	Liberal
3rd	1874–1874	Thomas McKay	Liberal–Conservative
3rd	1874–1878	Thomas McKay	Liberal–Conservative
4th	1878–1881	Thomas McKay	Liberal–Conservative
4th	1881–1882	Archibald McLelan	Conservative
5th	1882–1887	Archibald McLelan	Conservative
6th	1887–1887	Archibald McLelan	Conservative
6th	1887–1888	Archibald McLelan	Conservative
6th	1888–1891	Adams George Archibald	Liberal–Conservative
7th	1891–1896	William Albert Patterson	Conservative
8th	1896–1897	Wilbert David Dimock	Conservative
8th	1897–1900	Firman McClure	Liberal
9th	1900–1904	Seymour Eugene Gourley	Conservative
10th	1904–1907	Frederick Andrew Laurence	Liberal
10th	1907–1908	John Stanfield	Conservative
11th	1908–1911	John Stanfield	Conservative
12th	1911–1917	John Stanfield	Conservative
13th	1917–1920	Fleming Blanchard McCurdy	Government (Unionist)
13th	1921–1921	Fleming Blanchard McCurdy	Nationalist Liberal
14th	1921–1925	Harold Putnam	Liberal
15th	1925–1926	George Taylor MacNutt	Conservative
16th	1926–1930	George Taylor MacNutt	Conservative
17th	1930–1935	Martin Luther Urquhart	Liberal
Riding dissolved into Colchester—Hants (1935–1968)

== Election results ==
=== 1930 ===
1930 Canadian federal election
Party	Candidate	Votes	%	±%
Liberal	Martin Luther Urquhart	6,131	51.67	+11.65
Conservative	George Taylor MacNutt	5,734	48.33	-11.65
Total valid votes		11,865	–	
Source: Library of Parliament

=== 1926 ===
1926 Canadian federal election
Party	Candidate	Votes	%	±%
Conservative	George Taylor MacNutt	6,067	59.97	-5.39
Liberal	Alfred Dickie	4,049	40.03	+5.39
Total valid votes		10,116	–	
Source: Library of Parliament

=== 1925 ===
1925 Canadian federal election
Party	Candidate	Votes	%	±%
Conservative	George Taylor MacNutt	6,405	65.36	+16.79
Liberal	Maynard B. Archibald	3,394	34.64	-16.79
Total valid votes		9,799	–	
Source: Library of Parliament

=== 1921 ===
1921 Canadian federal election
Party	Candidate	Votes	%	±%
Liberal	Harold Putnam	5,888	51.42	–
Conservative	Fleming Blanchard McCurdy	5,562	48.58	–
Total valid votes		11,450	–	
Source: Library of Parliament

=== 1920 by-election ===
Canadian federal by-election, 20 September 1920 On Fleming Blanchard McCurdy being appointed Minister of Public Works, 13 July 1920
Party	Candidate	Votes	%
Nationalist Liberal	Fleming Blanchard McCurdy	6,478	56.27
United Farmers	Hugh Archibald Dickson	5,034	43.73
Total valid votes		11,512	–

=== 1917 ===
1917 Canadian federal election
Party	Candidate	Votes
Government (Unionist)	Fleming Blanchard McCurdy	acclaimed
Total valid votes		–
Source: Library of Parliament

=== 1911 ===
1911 Canadian federal election
Party	Candidate	Votes	%	±%
Conservative	John Stanfield	2,847	56.38	+5.30
Liberal	Samuel David McLellan	2,203	43.62	-5.30
Total valid votes		5,050	–	
Source: Library of Parliament

=== 1908 ===
1908 Canadian federal election
Party	Candidate	Votes	%	±%
Conservative	John Stanfield	2,736	51.07	+2.97
Liberal	Charles Hill	2,621	48.93	-2.97
Total valid votes		5,357	–	
Source: Library of Parliament

=== 1907 by-election ===
Canadian federal by-election, 28 November 1907 On Mr. Laurence being appointed Judge, 4 November 1907
Party	Candidate	Votes	%
Conservative	John Stanfield	2,586	52.25
Liberal	Charles Hill	2,363	47.75
Total valid votes		4,949	–

=== 1904 ===
1904 Canadian federal election
Party	Candidate	Votes	%	±%
Liberal	Frederick Andrew Laurence	2,610	51.90	+4.92
Conservative	Seymour Eugene Gourley	2,419	48.10	-4.92
Total valid votes		5,029	–	
Source: Library of Parliament

=== 1900 ===
1900 Canadian federal election
Party	Candidate	Votes	%	±%
Conservative	Seymour Eugene Gourley	2,449	53.02	+1.17
Liberal	Firman McClure	2,170	46.98	-1.17
Total valid votes		4,619	–	
Source: Library of Parliament

=== 1897 by-election ===
Canadian federal by-election, 20 April 1897 On Wilbert David Dimock's election being declared void, 19 January 1897
Party	Candidate	Votes	%
Liberal	Firman McClure	2,350	50.06
Conservative	D.H. Muir	2,344	49.94
Total valid votes		4,694	–

=== 1896 ===
1896 Canadian federal election
Party	Candidate	Votes	%	±%
Conservative	Wilbert David Dimock	2,483	51.85	-5.18
Liberal	Firman McClure	2,306	48.15	+8.82
Total valid votes		4,789	–	
Source: Library of Parliament

=== 1891 ===
1891 Canadian federal election
Party	Candidate	Votes	%	±%
Conservative	William Albert Patterson	2,588	57.03	-0.32
Liberal	P. McG. Archibald	1,785	39.33	-3.31
Progressive	A.B. Fletcher	165	3.64	–
Total valid votes		4,538	–	
Source: Library of Parliament

=== 1888 by-election ===
Canadian federal by-election, 15 August 1888 On Archibald McLelan being appointed Lieutenant-Governor of Nova Scotia
Party	Candidate	Votes	%
Liberal–Conservative	Adams George Archibald	1,773	52.85
Unknown	Cyrus Eaton	1,267	37.76
Unknown	E. Fulton	315	9.39
Total valid votes		3,355	–

=== 1887 by-election ===
Canadian federal by-election, 27 October 1887 On Archibald McLelan being un-seated for bribery by agents
Party	Candidate	Votes	%	±%
Conservative	Archibald McLelan	2,137	58.58	+1.23
Liberal	Samuel David McLelland	1,511	41.42	-1.23
Total valid votes		3,648	–	

=== 1887 ===
1887 Canadian federal election
Party	Candidate	Votes	%	±%
Conservative	Archibald McLelan	2,446	57.35	+0.84
Liberal	Samuel David McLellan	1,819	42.65	-0.84
Total valid votes		4,265	–	
Source: Library of Parliament

=== 1882 ===
1882 Canadian federal election
Party	Candidate	Votes	%	±%
Conservative	Archibald McLelan	1,887	56.51	+0.79
Unknown	Frederick Andrew Laurence	1,452	43.49	-0.79
Total valid votes		3,339	–	
Source: Library of Parliament

=== 1881 by-election ===
Canadian federal by-election, 18 June 1881 On Thomas McKay's resignation in June 1881
Party	Candidate	Votes	%
Conservative	Archibald McLelan	1,802	56.74
Independent	Charles N. Cummings	1,374	43.26
Total valid votes		3,176	–

=== 1878 ===
1878 Canadian federal election
Party	Candidate	Votes	%	±%
Liberal–Conservative	Thomas McKay	1,829	55.73	3.61
Unknown	Alex C. Page	1,453	44.27	–
Total valid votes		3,282	–	
Source: Library of Parliament

=== 1874 by-election ===
Canadian federal by-election, 17 December 1874 On Thomas McKay being un-seated on petition, 14 November 1874
Party	Candidate	Votes	%
Liberal–Conservative	Thomas McKay	1,818	65.66
Unknown	Alex C. Page	951	34.34
Total valid votes		2,769	–

=== 1874 ===
1874 Canadian federal election
Party	Candidate	Votes	%	±%
Liberal–Conservative	Thomas McKay	1,429	52.12	–
Liberal	Frederick M. Pearson	1,313	47.88	-9.59
Total valid votes		2,742	–	
Source: Library of Parliament

=== 1872 ===
1872 Canadian federal election
Party	Candidate	Votes	%	±%
Liberal	Frederick M. Pearson	1,634	57.47	–
Unknown	J.F. Blanchard	1,209	42.53	–
Total valid votes		2,843	–	
Source: Library of Parliament

=== 1870 by-election ===
Canadian federal by-election, 8 November 1870 On Adams George Archibald being appointed Lieutenant-Governor of Manitoba and the Northwest Territories, May 1870
Party	Candidate	Votes	%
Liberal	Frederick M. Pearson	1,672	86.19
Unknown	R. Chambers	268	13.81
Total valid votes		1,940	–

=== 1869 by-election ===
Canadian federal by-election, 9 September 1869 On Archibald McLelan being called to the Senate, August 1869
Party	Candidate	Votes	%
Liberal–Conservative	Adams George Archibald	1,585	56.31
Liberal	Frederick M. Pearson	1,230	43.69
Total valid votes		2,815	–

=== 1867 ===
1867 Canadian federal election
Party	Candidate	Votes	%
Anti-Confederation	Archibald McLelan	1,649	56.13
Liberal–Conservative	Adams George Archibald	1,289	43.87
Total valid votes		2,938	–
Source: Library of Parliament

== See also ==
- List of Canadian electoral districts
- Historical federal electoral districts of Canada
