= Fletcher Bath Wade =

Canadian politician

Member of Parliament for Annapolis
- In office 1900–1904
- Preceded by: John B. Mills
- Succeeded by: Samuel Walter Willet Pickup

Personal details
- Born: September 9, 1852 Granville, Nova Scotia
- Died: May 23, 1905 (aged 52)
- Party: Liberal
- Profession: barrister

Fletcher Bath Wade (September 9, 1852 in Granville, Nova Scotia – May 23, 1905) was a Canadian politician and barrister. He was elected to the House of Commons of Canada in 1900 as a member of the Liberal Party to represent the riding of Annapolis.

1900 Canadian federal election: Annapolis
Party	Candidate	Votes	%	±%
Liberal	Fletcher Bath Wade	1,883	52.07	+4.65
Conservative	John Burpee Mills	1,733	47.93	-4.65
Total valid votes		3,616	–	
Source: Library of Parliament
