= George Taylor MacNutt =

Canadian politician (1865–1937)

Member of Parliament for Colchester
- In office October 1925 – July 1930
- Preceded by: Harold Putnam
- Succeeded by: Martin Luther Urquhart

Personal details
- Born: George Taylor MacNutt; 19 December 1865 Stewiacke, Nova Scotia
- Died: 24 May 1937 (aged 71)
- Party: Conservative
- Spouse(s): Sadie B. Pollock m. 22 June 1892 (died by 1929)
- Profession: contractor, lumber merchant

George Taylor MacNutt (19 December 1865 – 24 May 1937) was a Canadian businessman and politician. MacNutt served as a Conservative member of the House of Commons of Canada. He was born in Stewiacke, Nova Scotia and became a contractor and lumber merchant.

MacNutt attended public school in Nova Scotia, then Truro Academy. He campaigned in the 1911 Nova Scotia provincial election for a seat at Guysborough riding but was not successful.

He was first elected to Parliament at the Colchester riding in the 1925 general election. MacNutt was re-elected there in the 1926 election then defeated by Martin Luther Urquhart of the Liberal party in the 1930 federal election.

== Electoral record ==
1925 Canadian federal election: Colchester
Party	Candidate	Votes	%	±%
Conservative	George Taylor MacNutt	6,405	65.36	+16.79
Liberal	Maynard B. Archibald	3,394	34.64	-16.79
Total valid votes		9,799	–	
Source: Library of Parliament

1926 Canadian federal election: Colchester
Party	Candidate	Votes	%	±%
Conservative	George Taylor MacNutt	6,067	59.97	-5.39
Liberal	Alfred Dickie	4,049	40.03	+5.39
Total valid votes		10,116	–	
Source: Library of Parliament

1930 Canadian federal election: Colchester
Party	Candidate	Votes	%	±%
Liberal	Martin Luther Urquhart	6,131	51.67	+11.65
Conservative	George Taylor MacNutt	5,734	48.33	-11.65
Total valid votes		11,865	–	
Source: Library of Parliament
