= Firman McClure =

Canadian politician

Firman McClure (November 19, 1861 – March 28, 1901) was a lawyer, editor and political figure in Nova Scotia, Canada. He represented Colchester County in the Nova Scotia House of Assembly from 1896 to 1897 and Colchester in the House of Commons of Canada from 1897 to 1900 as a Liberal member.

He was born in Truro, Nova Scotia, the son of John McClure and Susan Kent, and educated in the provincial normal school there. In 1896, he married Dora M. Inglis. He was a prominent member of the Sons of Temperance in Nova Scotia. McClure was editor and publisher for the Truro Guardian and then was editor of the Temperance Index. He practised law in Truro. He ran unsuccessfully for a federal seat in 1896. McClure was unsuccessful in a bid for reelection in 1900. He died in Truro at the age of 39.

== Electoral record ==
1896 Canadian federal election: Colchester
Party	Candidate	Votes	%	±%
Conservative	Wilbert David Dimock	2,483	51.85	-5.18
Liberal	Firman McClure	2,306	48.15	+8.82
Total valid votes		4,789	–	
Source: Library of Parliament

Canadian federal by-election, 20 April 1897: Colchester On Wilbert David Dimock's election being declared void, 19 January 1897
Party	Candidate	Votes	%
Liberal	Firman McClure	2,350	50.06
Conservative	D.H. Muir	2,344	49.94
Total valid votes		4,694	–

1900 Canadian federal election: Colchester
Party	Candidate	Votes	%	±%
Conservative	Seymour Eugene Gourley	2,449	53.02	+1.17
Liberal	Firman McClure	2,170	46.98	-1.17
Total valid votes		4,619	–	
Source: Library of Parliament
