= Fleming Blanchard McCurdy =

Canadian politician (1875–1952)

The Honourable Fleming Blanchard McCurdy PC
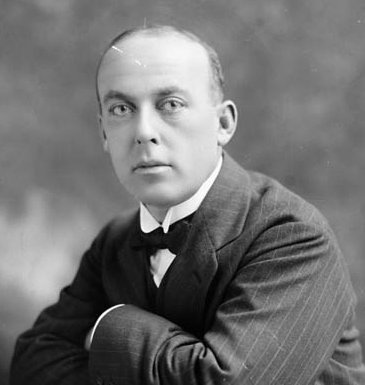

Member of the Canadian Parliament for Shelburne and Queen's
- In office 1911–1917
- Preceded by: William Stevens Fielding
- Succeeded by: William Stevens Fielding

Member of the Canadian Parliament for Colchester
- In office 1917–1921
- Preceded by: John Stanfield
- Succeeded by: Harold Putnam

Personal details
- Born: February 17, 1875 Old Barns, Nova Scotia
- Died: August 29, 1952 (aged 77)
- Cabinet: Minister of Public Works (1920–1921)

Fleming Blanchard McCurdy, PC (February 17, 1875 – August 29, 1952) was a Canadian politician.

Born in Old Barns, Nova Scotia, he was elected to the House of Commons of Canada for the Nova Scotia riding of Shelburne and Queen's in the 1911 election as a Conservative. He was re-elected in the 1917 election for the riding of Colchester as a supporter of Sir Robert Laird Borden's Unionist government.

In 1916, he was one of the first parliamentarians to be appointed a Parliamentary Secretary, when he was appointed Parliamentary Secretary of Militia and Defence for Sam Hughes. He was also the Parliamentary Secretary of Soldiers' Civil Re-establishment. Upon his appointment to Borden's Cabinet in 1920 as Minister of Public Works he was required by the custom of the time to resign his seat and run in a by-election. By this point it was customary for Cabinet ministers running in by-elections to be acclaimed however, the newly formed United Farmers party contested the by-election with a United-Farmers/Labour candidate. McCurdy opted to face this challenge by running as a Nationalist Liberal rather than as a Conservative and was re-elected, though narrowly. It is possible he chose this banner as the Unionist Party had formally changed its name to the National Liberal and Conservative Party by this time or as a means of facing down the threat from a left-wing candidate. In any case, Blanchard ran the following year in the 1921 election as a Conservative and was defeated.

1917 Canadian federal election: Colchester
Party	Candidate	Votes
Government (Unionist)	Fleming Blanchard McCurdy	acclaimed
Total valid votes		–
Source: Library of Parliament

By-election on 20 September 1920 On Mr. McCurdy being appointed Minister of Public Works, 13 July 1920
Party	Candidate	Votes
Nationalist Liberal	Fleming Blanchard McCurdy	6,478
United Farmers	Hugh Archibald Dickson	5,034

1921 Canadian federal election: Colchester
Party	Candidate	Votes	%	±%
Liberal	Harold Putnam	5,888	51.42	–
Conservative	Fleming Blanchard McCurdy	5,562	48.58	–
Total valid votes		11,450	–	
Source: Library of Parliament
