= Harold Putnam =

Harold Putnam may refer to:

- Harold Putnam (Canadian politician)
- Harold Putnam (Massachusetts politician)
