= Samuel Walter Willet Pickup =

Canadian politician

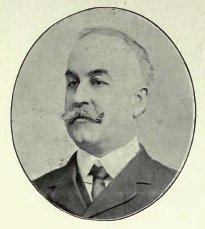

Member of the Canadian Parliament for Annapolis
- In office 1904–1911
- Preceded by: Fletcher Bath Wade
- Succeeded by: Avard Longley Davidson

Member of the Legislative Council of Nova Scotia
- In office 1913–1928

Personal details
- Born: March 1, 1859 Granville Ferry, Nova Scotia
- Died: November 15, 1935 (aged 76)
- Party: Liberal

Samuel Walter Willet Pickup (March 1, 1859 – November 15, 1935) was a Canadian farmer, merchant, shipbuilder, shipowner, and politician.

Born in Granville Ferry, Annapolis County, Nova Scotia, the son of Samuel Pickup, of English Loyalist descent, and Cyline G. Willett Pickup, his wife, of French Huguenot Loyalist descent, Pickup was educated in the Common Schools and at Mount Allison College (now Mount Allison University) in Sackville, New Brunswick. A merchant, farmer, shipbuilder, and shipowner, Pickup was a member of the Municipal Council for Annapolis County for eighteen years, during three years of which he was Warden of the County. He was elected to the House of Commons of Canada for the electoral district of Annapolis in the 1904 federal election. A Liberal, he was re-elected in 1908 and was defeated in 1911. He was defeated again in the 1930 federal election. In 1913, he was appointed to the Legislative Council of Nova Scotia, which was abolished in 1928.

== electoral record ==
1904 Canadian federal election: Annapolis
| Party | Candidate | Votes | % | ±% |
|---|---|---|---|---|
| Liberal | Samuel Walter Willet Pickup | 2,013 | 52.88 | +0.80 |
| Conservative | Lawrence D. Shaffner | 1,794 | 47.12 | -0.80 |
| Total valid votes | | 3,807 | – | |
Source: Library of Parliament

1908 Canadian federal election: Annapolis
| Party | Candidate | Votes | % | ±% |
|---|---|---|---|---|
| Liberal | Samuel Walter Willet Pickup | 2,121 | 52.62 | -0.26 |
| Conservative | George E. Corbitt | 1,910 | 47.38 | +0.26 |
| Total valid votes | | 4,031 | – | |
Source: Library of Parliament

1911 Canadian federal election: Annapolis
| Party | Candidate | Votes | % | ±% |
|---|---|---|---|---|
| Conservative | Avard Longley Davidson | 2,131 | 50.15 | +2.77 |
| Liberal | Samuel Walter Willet Pickup | 2,118 | 49.85 | -2.77 |
| Total valid votes | | 4,249 | – | |
Source: Library of Parliament
