= Kevin Page =

Kevin Page may refer to:

- Kevin Page (economist)
- Kevin Page (actor)
- Kevin Page (Marvel Cinematic Universe)
