= Wilbert David Dimock =

Canadian politician

Member of the Canadian Parliament for Colchester
- In office 1896–1897
- Preceded by: William Albert Patterson
- Succeeded by: Firman McClure

Personal details
- Born: November 27, 1846 Onslow, Nova Scotia, British North America
- Died: August 23, 1930 (aged 83)
- Party: Conservative

Wilbert David Dimock (November 27, 1846 – August 23, 1930) was a Canadian teacher, principal, journalist and politician.

Born in Onslow, Nova Scotia, the son of Rev. D. W. C. Dimock, Dimock was educated at the Model Schools of Truro and at Acadia University where he graduated with a Bachelor of Arts degree in 1867. He was a teacher and later became principal of the North Sydney Academy and the Model Schools at Truro. In 1883, he was the secretary and treasurer of the Canadian Department Internal Fisheries Exhibition held in London, England. In 1886, he was the agent for the Nova Scotia Industrial and Colonial Exhibition also held in London. In 1889, he was the manager of the Maritime Province Exhibition held in Moncton, New Brunswick. In 1891, he was the superintendent of the Canadian section of the Jamaica Exhibition. In 1893, he was secretary of the Canadian section at the World's Columbian Exposition was held in Chicago.

In 1894, he became editor of the Truro News. He was elected to the Nova Scotia House of Assembly in 1894 for the electoral district of Colchester County. He resigned in 1896 and was elected to the House of Commons of Canada for the electoral district of Colchester. A Conservative, he was unseated in 1897 when the election was declared void. He did not run in the resulting by-election.

1896 Canadian federal election: Colchester
Party	Candidate	Votes	%	±%
Conservative	Wilbert David Dimock	2,483	51.85	-5.18
Liberal	Firman McClure	2,306	48.15	+8.82
Total valid votes		4,789	–	
Source: Library of Parliament
