= Harry Short =

Canadian politician

Harry B. Short

Member of Parliament for Digby—Annapolis
- In office October 1925 – August 1935
- Preceded by: Lewis Johnstone Lovett
- Succeeded by: riding dissolved

Personal details
- Born: Harry Bernard Short; 1 September 1864 Bear River, Nova Scotia
- Died: 15 April 1937 (aged 72)
- Party: Conservative
- Spouse: Flora K. Robinson (m. 1891)
- Profession: Manager

Harry Bernard Short (1 September 1864 – 15 April 1937) was a Conservative member of the House of Commons of Canada. He was born in Bear River, Nova Scotia and became a corporate manager and municipal politician.

Short attended school at Digby Academy. For five years, he served as Digby's mayor, and was director and manager of Maritime Fish Corporation's Digby division.

He was first elected to Parliament at the Digby—Annapolis riding in the 1925 general election and re-elected there in 1926 and 1930. After completing his term in the 17th Canadian Parliament, Short did not seek re-election in 1935.
