= Heather Lank =

Canadian parliamentary librarian

Heather Lank was the Parliamentary Librarian of Canada from 2018 to 2024.

== Biography ==
Lank was born in Arvida, Quebec.

=== Education ===
Lank holds both a master's and doctorate in sociology from the University of Toronto.

=== Career ===
Lank started her public service career when she joined the federal public service in 1990 as an operational auditor with Correctional Service of Canada. In 1991, she joined the Senate of Canada administration as a committee clerk, and has served in several roles and positions over the years, including senior leadership roles. From 2015 to 2018, Lank served as Principal Clerk of the Senate Chamber Operations and Procedure Office. In 2018, Prime Minister Justin Trudeau announced the appointment of Lank as the Parliamentary Librarian for the Library of Parliament.

In early 2020, Lank recommended that poems by Stephen Brown be removed from the parliamentary poet laureate website. The poet was convicted of manslaughter in 1995 after killing an Indigenous woman, Pamela George.
