= Martin Luther Urquhart =

Canadian politician (1883–1961)

Member of Parliament for Colchester
- In office July 1930 – August 1935
- Preceded by: George T. MacNutt
- Succeeded by: riding dissolved

Personal details
- Born: Martin Luther Urquhart; 4 June 1883 Waugh's River, Nova Scotia, Canada
- Died: 3 November 1961 (aged 78)
- Party: Liberal
- Spouse: Carrie Drysdale
- Profession: grocery wholesaler

Martin Luther Urquhart (4 June 1883 – 3 November 1961) was a Liberal party member of the House of Commons of Canada. He was born in Waugh's River, Nova Scotia and became a grocery wholesaler.

He was first elected to Parliament at the Colchester riding in the 1930 general election. After completing his only federal term, the 17th Canadian Parliament, Urquhart left federal politics and did not seek another term in the 1935 election.

== Personal life ==
His wife was Carrie Drysdale. He died in 1961.
