= William Albert Patterson =

Canadian politician

William Albert Patterson (July 10, 1841 – June 14, 1917) was a Canadian politician, who represented the electoral district of Colchester in the House of Commons of Canada from 1891 to 1896 as a member of the Conservative Party.

He was born in Pictou, Nova Scotia, the son of Abram Patterson and Christiana McGregor. He was a lumber merchant. In 1869, he married Bessie Campbell. Patterson represented Colchester County in the Nova Scotia House of Assembly from 1874 to 1886 as a Liberal-Conservative member. He was defeated when he ran for reelection in 1886. Patterson also served as a captain in the militia.

== Electoral record ==
1891 Canadian federal election: Colchester
Party	Candidate	Votes
Conservative	William Albert Patterson	2,588
Liberal	P. McG. Archibald	1,785
Unknown	A.B. Fletcher	165

Parliament of Canada
Preceded by Adams George Archibald	Member of Parliament from Colchester; 1891–1896	Succeeded by Wilbert David Dimock
