= Lewis Johnstone Lovett =

Canadian politician

Member of Parliament for Digby and Annapolis
- In office December 1921 – September 1925
- Preceded by: Avard Longley Davidson
- Succeeded by: Harry Short

Personal details
- Born: Lewis Johnstone Lovett; 28 August 1867 Kentville, Nova Scotia
- Died: 27 April 1942 (aged 74) Pinehurst, North Carolina
- Party: Liberal
- Spouse: Josephine Troope
- Profession: physician

Lewis Johnstone Lovett (28 August 1867 – 27 April 1942) was a Liberal party member of the House of Commons of Canada. He was born in Kentville, Nova Scotia and became a physician.

The son of Henry Lovett and Annie Johnstone, he was at Acadia University and New York University and practised medicine at Bear River in Digby County. In 1896, Lovett married Josephine Troope.

He was first elected to Parliament at the Digby and Annapolis riding in the 1921 general election after an unsuccessful campaign there as a Laurier Liberal in the 1917 federal election. After serving one term, the 14th Canadian Parliament, Lovett was defeated by Harry Short of the Conservatives in the 1925 federal election. Lovett was also unsuccessful in unseating Short in the 1926 federal election, when the riding became known as Digby—Annapolis.
