= Elnathan Whitman =

Canadian politician

Elnathan Whitman (November 18, 1785 – 1868) was a farmer and political figure in Nova Scotia. He represented the township of Annapolis in the Nova Scotia House of Assembly from 1836 to 1840.

He was born at Rosette (later Round Hill, Nova Scotia), the son of Elizabeth (Rice) and John Whitman, and, after completing his education, engaged in agriculture and fruit-growing. Whitman's first wife was Eleanor Spurr; he later married Charlotte Tupper. He died at Round Hill at the age of 83.

His son George and his brother Alfred also served in the provincial assembly.

== Descendants ==
The American business executive and diplomat Meg Whitman is his great-great-great-granddaughter.
