= William R. Young =

Parliamentary Librarian of Canada
- In office 2005–2011
- Preceded by: Richard Paré
- Succeeded by: Sonia L'Heureux

Personal details
- Born: 1946 (age 79–80) Toronto, Ontario

William R. Young (born 2 June 1947) is a Canadian civil servant, who was the Parliamentary Librarian of Canada from 2005 to 2011. He is a former Canadian academic and public servant. Born in Toronto, Ontario, Young grew up in Woodbridge just outside the city.

As seventh Parliamentary Librarian of Canada, Young was one of the three deputy heads responsible for the administration of Parliament, where he managed research, information, public outreach and education. During his term, he presided over the final phase of the rehabilitation and upgrade of the Library of Parliament, a Canadian architectural masterpiece. He also initiated an organizational renewal, refocused services to Parliament and the public and he was recognized by the Inter-parliamentary Union, among others, for his work promoting innovation and collaboration approaches in legislative research and information services internationally.

After joining the Library of Parliament in 1987, Young moved from analyst to director providing analysis and advice to MPs, Senators and parliamentary committees on policy directions and on drafting, scrutinizing and amending legislation. In 2004, he was seconded to the public service as the departmental senior policy adviser to the Minister of Social Development and later to the Minister of Canadian Heritage.

Young received his Ph.D. in history from the University of British Columbia in 1978. He has held appointments at York, Simon Fraser, McGill and Toronto universities, and is a By-Fellow of Churchill College, University of Cambridge, where he conducted research into propaganda during WWII. As an historian, he wrote books, conference papers, academic and popular articles. He also produced parliamentary publications on social issues (particularly disability) and parliamentary reform.

A Trustee of the Canadian Museum of History, and a founding board member of the Samara Centre for Democracy. Young is active in the community and previously, served as a Director of the Canadian Association of Research Libraries, Director of the Association of Parliamentary Librarians in Canada, Board Member of ESSA (now CAPE, the Canadian Association of Professional Employees), and Board Member of the Conservation Review Board of Ontario.

In addition to several academic scholarships, Young received an award from the Council of Canadians with Disabilities and was made an Honorary Member of the Canadian Association of Former Parliamentarians and Honorary Director of the Churchill Society for the Advancement of Parliamentary Democracy.

== Selected publications ==
- Paul Martin: The London Diaries, 1975–1979, University of Ottawa Press, Ottawa and London, 1987.
- Sacred Trust: Brian Mulroney and the Conservative Party in Power, with David Bercuson and J.L. Granatstein, Doubleday, Toronto 1986.
- “The Federal Government and Social Policy in the 1990s: Reflections on Change and Continuity,” with John English, Canadian Social Policy, University of Waterloo Press, Waterloo, 2003.
- “Promoting the People’s War: Domestic Propaganda and Morale,” L’Annee 43: Guerre Totale, 4-5- November 1993, University de Caen, Memorial de Caen, Caen, France, 1994.
- The Parliament We Want: Parliamentarians’ Views of Parliamentary Reform, with Carolyn Bennett, MP: Deborah Grey, MP; Hon. Yves Morin, Senator; and Graham Fox, Library of Parliament, Ottawa 2003.
- “Partnering at the Canadian library of Parliament,” World Library and Information Congress: 73rd IFLA General Conference and Council, 19–23 August 2007, Durban, South Africa. http://www.ifla.org/iv/ifla73/index.htm
