= Harold Putnam (Canadian politician) =

Canadian politician (1868–1945)

Harold Putnam KC

Member of Parliament for Colchester
- In office December 1921 – September 1925
- Preceded by: Fleming Blanchard McCurdy
- Succeeded by: George Taylor MacNutt

Personal details
- Born: 19 November 1868 Onslow, Nova Scotia
- Died: 13 November 1945 (aged 76) Truro, Nova Scotia
- Party: Liberal
- Spouse: Mary Laurencem. 30 January 1900
- Profession: Lawyer

Harold Putnam KC (19 November 1868 – 13 November 1945) was a Liberal party member of the House of Commons of Canada. He was born in Onslow, Nova Scotia, and became a lawyer.

The son of Robert Putnam and Elizabeth Hunter Sprott, he was educated at public school in Onslow, then high school in Truro, then at the Pictou Academy and Dalhousie University. He practised law in Truro. In 1900, he married Mary Laurence. From 1900 to 1921, Putnam was registrar of deeds for Colchester County. He was also appointed a King's Counsel.

He was elected to Parliament at the Colchester riding in the 1921 general election. After serving in the 14th Canadian Parliament, Putnam left the House of Commons and did not seek another term in the 1925 federal election.

1921 Canadian federal election: Colchester
Party	Candidate	Votes	%	±%
Liberal	Harold Putnam	5,888	51.42	–
Conservative	Fleming Blanchard McCurdy	5,562	48.58	–
Total valid votes		11,450	–	
Source: Library of Parliament
