= Sonia L'Heureux =

Canadian civil servant

Parliamentary Librarian of Canada
- In office 2012–2018
- Preceded by: William Robert Young
- Succeeded by: Heather Lank

Parliamentary Budget Officer
- In office March 25, 2013 – September 2, 2013
- Preceded by: Kevin Page
- Succeeded by: Jean-Denis Fréchette

Personal details
- Born: Saint-Jean-sur-Richelieu, Quebec

Sonia L'Heureux is a Canadian civil servant, who was the Parliamentary Librarian of Canada from 2012 to 2018. She was the first woman ever named to the position.

Originally from Saint-Jean-sur-Richelieu, Quebec, L'Heureux joined the Canadian civil service in 1987. She worked for Human Resources and Social Development Canada, Finance Canada, Environment Canada and Energy, Mines and Resources Canada as a policy analyst before joining the Library of Parliament as associate librarian in 2008. She holds bachelor's and master's degrees in economics from the Université de Montréal.

Following the resignation of Kevin Page in March 2013, L'Heureux also served as interim Parliamentary Budget Officer until the appointment of Jean-Denis Fréchette in September.
