= Kevin Page (economist) =

1st Parliamentary Budget Officer of Canada

1st Parliamentary Budget Officer
- In office 2008 – March 22, 2013
- Succeeded by: Sonia L'Heureux (interim)

Personal details
- Born: Thunder Bay, Ontario, Canada
- Children: Tyler Page, Jesse Page and Chelsey Page
- Education: Queen's University
- Website: Parliamentary Budget Officer

Kevin Page (born 1957) is a Canadian economist, and was the first Parliamentary Budget Officer for Canada. He was appointed to the position on March 25, 2008, and his term was completed on March 22, 2013. He now teaches at the University of Ottawa. In 2013, Page was named as the Jean-Luc Pepin Research Chair on Canadian Government. In 2016, Page became the head of the newly created Institute of Fiscal Studies and Democracy (IFSD), a think tank with a focus on public finance and policy at the University of Ottawa.

== Early life ==
Page was born in Thunder Bay, Ontario, to James and Stella Page. A graduate of Fort William Collegiate Institute, he later studied at Lakehead University, went to Simon Fraser University on a golf scholarship and obtained his M.A. in economics from Queen's University, Kingston, Ontario.

== Career ==
Before being appointed to the position of Parliamentary Budget Officer, on March 25, 2008, Kevin Page had for twenty-seven years worked as a civil servant in the Canadian government with experience in central agencies and line departments including: Finance Canada; the Treasury Board Secretariat; the Privy Council Office; the Department of Fisheries and Oceans; Agriculture and Agri-Food Canada; and Human Resources and Social Development Canada.

=== Parliamentary Budget Officer ===
During the 2006 federal election campaign, the Conservative party promoted the creation of an independent Parliamentary Budget Office. The position of a PBO was created through the Federal Accountability Act of 2006 when the Conservatives won the election.

According to a Winnipeg Free Press, "at the time of his appointment, Page was an economist working within the Privy Council Office. He was the senior-most economist advising Prime Minister Stephen Harper." Page did not want the job as PBO but was encouraged by Harper's staff to interview for it. According to the Winnipeg Free Press' Dan Lett, in his three decades with the federal government, Page had "forged a reputation as a frank, non-nonsense advisor and analyst".

Page was the first Parliamentary Budget Officer, an independent officer of the Library of Parliament who reports to the Speakers of the House of Commons and Senate. The Parliamentary Budget Officer's responsibilities include providing an independent analysis of the state of the economy, the nation's finances and the government's expenditure plan, and an analysis of the expenditure estimates of any government department or agency when requested to do so by a Parliamentary committee that's reviewing those estimates. The officer is also mandated to provide an estimate of costs for any proposal that falls within the jurisdiction of the Parliament of Canada.

In his first two years, the PBO under Page "prepared five economic and fiscal updates and more than 20 research reports", and "provided assessments of cost estimates of policy initiatives proposed in legislation". Page "appeared before both House and Senate committees on eight occasions in three years, more than most deputy ministers, let alone ministers". During that time the PBO had a budget of only $2.8-million and a staff of 11. By September 2010 his staff dropped to nine.

According to an article by the TBNewsWatch, during his tenure as PBO, Page "sparred with then prime minister Stephen Harper questioning "government estimates and issuing reports that [were] at odds with official [Conservative] government forecasts".

Page released his fall 2008 fiscal analysis that said Canada was "headed toward a budget deficit" rejecting then-Minister of Finance, Jim Flaherty's post-election prediction that Canada "would avoid both a recession and a deficit". Page's October 9, 2008 report contradicted the official federal government's estimate of the cost of the Canadian military mission in Afghanistan. The Parliamentary Budget Office report found that the cost would be from $14-billion to $18-billion by 2011 when Canadian troops would withdraw. This represents "billions more than Ottawa has estimated, and perhaps almost twice as high."

In February 2009, Page challenged the federal government's optimistic budget projections with its stimulus package that he said was too small and therefore ineffective, given the severity of the Great Recession.

In 2009 Canadian Business article Page was cited as saying, "There are former parliamentarians saying I should be held in contempt of Parliament and should be fired, but I'm okay with them saying that. That's just part of the debate." He has been unapologetic about his desire to give the Parliamentary Budget Office a significant role in informing Parliament and Canadians about government finances, saying "I went to the OECD, and they said the Americans have the best budget office, bar none. Why can't we be the best in five years? If that's overstepping my mandate, then I'm earning my money." (Note: According to the 2010 iPolitics article, the largest "specialized budget research office... attached to the legislature to conduct analyses of the budget is the U.S. Congressional Budget Office, which ha[d] a budget of $45-million (U.S.) and employs about 250 professionals [in 2010]. From its very beginning, the CBO has expanded its functions far from what was originally envisaged to become a non-partisan, independent, objective, analytical agency.")

Page published a scathing report on June 22, 2010, examining the fiscal impact of the Harper governments' Truth in Sentencing Act, a flagship of the administration's tough-on-crime agenda. The report said that the implementation of the act would cost over a billion dollars annually.

According to Page's March 10, 2011 report, it would cost "$30 billion to buy and maintain" 65 -35 Joint Strike Fighter planes. The federal government estimated the cost would be $9-billion.

In September 2011, Page reported that federal expenditures were generally consistent with Budget 2011 plan.

In February 2012, Jim Flaherty, then-Minister of Finance in the Harper government, described Page as "unbelievable, unreliable, incredible" during a "scrum with reporters". Flaherty was responding to questions about Page's PBO report that contrary to the Harper government's claim, Canada's Old Age Security (OAS) "system was sustainable" and affordable, and there was no need to "increase the age of entitlement from 65 to 67" for OAS and Guaranteed Income Supplement (GIS).

By December 2012 Page had taken the federal government to court to access more "information on $5.2 billion in budget cuts." In June 2011 Page "sought a legal opinion on [the] power of direct request". By September 2011, eleven months into the fiscal year of Budget 2012, the cabinet ministers still had submitted no spending plans representing a "$250-billion enterprise" with "80-plus departments and agencies". Even the "Clerk [of the Privy Council]" said that the PBO had exceeded its mandate. Page felt that the Office had a choice but to take the government to court.

By September 2010, Page had announced he would not seek a second term as parliamentary budget officer. Since it was established in 2008, the PBO was in a "constant battle with the federal government over his independence, inadequate budget and lack of staff".

Just months before he left office, Page in an interview with iPolitics, observed changes in the way the federal government worked. In the late 1980s, with Conservative Brian Mulroney as Prime Minister, during debates on free trade or GST, "the Finance Department would release major papers on free trade impacts, calculations, there'd be a major debate. GST, the same thing: the big transition from a manufacturing sales tax. Analytical papers, lots of transparency, debate." He noted that that no longer exists.

== University of Ottawa ==
Since 2012, Page has been a professor at the University of Ottawa.

=== Jean-Luc Pepin Research Chair ===
In 2013, Page was named as the Jean-Luc Pepin Research Chair, a Chair on Canadian Government honouring Jean-Luc Pepin at the University of Ottawa.

=== Institute of Fiscal Studies and Democracy ===
In 2016, Page became the head of the newly created Institute of Fiscal Studies and Democracy (IFSD), a think tank with a focus on public finance and policy at the University of Ottawa. It was funded by the Government of Ontario. JLP works with a network of international and domestic organizations, such as the World Bank, the Organisation for Economic Co-operation and Development (OECD), the International Monetary Fund (IMF) and the National Governors Association.

According to a 2013 Maclean's article, Page had the support of the University of Ottawa's then-President Allan Rock, to establish an institute that would "study the math of public policy", similar to the work of the Parliamentary Budget Office.

== Publications ==
In August 2015, Page published Unaccountable: Truth and Lies on Parliament Hill, about the federal public service under the Harper administration, which Page described as "virtually impotent". Page called for an "overhaul" with a "new generation of public servants." According to a 2015 review in the Ottawa Citizen, Page said that "the public service [had] been politicized at senior levels and [was] no longer transparent with Canadians — it [had] stopped showing the work it does on behalf of taxpayers."

== Awards and honours ==
In 2017, Page received an Honorary Doctor of Law from Lakehead University.

== Family ==
His children are Tyler Page, Jesse Page, and Chelsey Page. Tyler was killed in 2006 at the age of 20 after being struck by a train while walking home along a railway line near Perth, Ontario, and there is now a bursary in Tyler's name at Algonquin College's Perth campus.

== Personal life ==
In 2012, Page was a coach for the Nepean Raiders' Pee Wee hockey team.
