= Thomas McKay (Canadian politician) =

Canadian politician (1839–1912)

The Hon. Thomas McKay
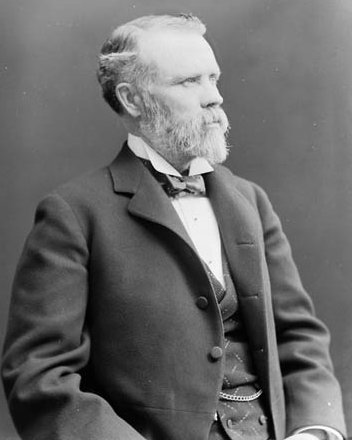

Member of the Canadian Parliament for Colchester
- In office 1874–1881
- Preceded by: Frederick M. Pearson
- Succeeded by: Archibald McLelan

Senator for Truro, Nova Scotia
- In office 1881–1912
- Appointed by: Sir John A. Macdonald

Personal details
- Born: January 8, 1839 Pictou, Nova Scotia
- Died: January 13, 1912 (aged 73) Truro, Nova Scotia
- Party: Liberal-Conservative

Thomas McKay (January 8, 1839 – January 13, 1912) was a Canadian politician.

Born in Pictou County, Nova Scotia, the son of William McKay, who emigrated from Sutherland, Scotland, McKay was educated in Pictou. In 1868, he married Jessie Blair. A merchant, he was first elected to the House of Commons of Canada for Colchester in the 1874 general election. Unseated on petition in November 1874, he was re-elected and again in 1878. He resigned in June 1881 and was called to the Senate on the advice of John Alexander Macdonald on December 24, 1881 representing the senatorial division of Truro, Nova Scotia. A Liberal-Conservative, he served for 37 years until his death in 1912 in Truro.
