= Round Hill, Nova Scotia =

Community in Nova Scotia, Canada

Coordinates: 44°46′24.78″N 65°24′10.13″W

Round Hill in Nova Scotia

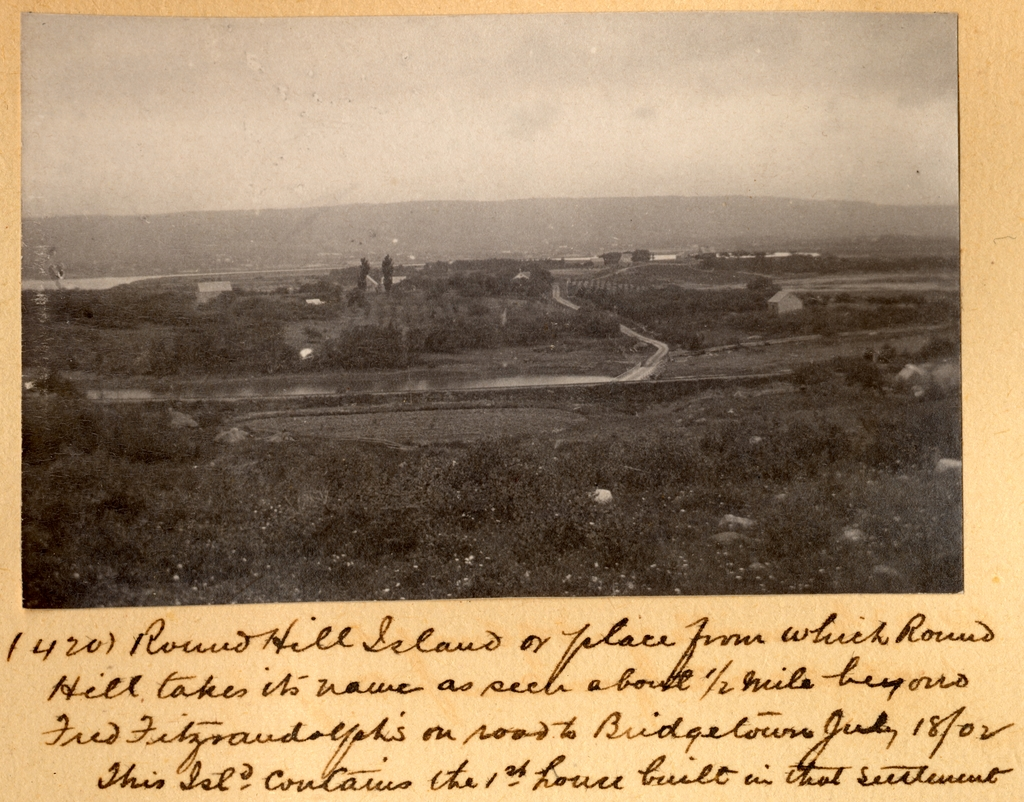
Picture at Canadian Museum of History showing Round Hill Island, Nova Scotia

Round Hill is an historic community on the Annapolis River in Nova Scotia’s verdant Annapolis Valley halfway between the Valley market towns of Bridgetown and Annapolis Royal. It is 10 kilometres east of Annapolis Royal on Route 201 and the same distance west of Bridgetown.

Known as Rosette to the French, the area was settled in the early 1600s by the Acadians from France’s Nouvelle-Aquitaine region. The Acadian legacy remains in the form of dikes, orchards and the remnants of their mills and other structures as well as in family names and the names of nearby communities and geographical features. The Acadians were followed in the mid 18th century by English and Scots, including the New England Planters from the eastern seaboard of the United States. United Empire Loyalists arrived soon after as a consequence of the American Revolution, the most famous being the "Outlaw of the Bronx" James De Lancey. All of those groups have contributed to the development of a community of farms, orchards, vineyards and woodlots that is today both pretty and productive.

Round Hill is exactly halfway between London, England, and Los Angeles, California. It is close to the east coast of the United States and has had historical trading relationships with Great Britain, the eastern United States and the Caribbean Islands to the south. It is within an easy drive to Stanfield International Airport in Halifax and also to ferry terminals offering daily service to the northeastern United States and Saint John, New Brunswick. The community is home to people from both Europe and the United States as well as to residents who have moved from other parts of Canada in search of a favourable climate and growing conditions, especially for fruits and vegetables.

With close proximity to both the Bay of Fundy, which insures its temperate climate, and the classic Canadian lakes and forests of Nova Scotia's Kejimkujic National Park, Round Hill offers a variety of beautiful landscapes and opportunities for outdoor activities and sightseeing. A trail constructed along an old rail bed of the Dominion Atlantic Railway runs through the community along the Annapolis River offering vistas of the hills to the north and south which form the famous fruit-growing region of the Annapolis Valley.

The Round Hill River flows through the community descending the South Mountain through old wood lots until eventually joining the Annapolis River. The woods still contain examples of the original Acadian forest with stands of hemlock, eastern white pine, sugar maple and other trees which provide habitat for the area's rich wildlife.

Round Hill has abundant populations of both wildlife and birdlife. White-tailed deer, black bear, lynx, bobcats, porcupine and other species are found in the area. Pileated woodpeckers, bald eagles, osprey, woodcock, warblers, hummingbirds and other bird species are commonly seen. The area has the largest pheasant population east of the Mississippi. Round Hill is directly on the migratory route of the monarch butterfly and local efforts are underway to protect and increase its habitat.

The Annapolis River has striped bass, sturgeon and sea trout and even occasionally a whale from the Bay of Fundy finds its way up the river. The Round Hill River has brook trout and small eels but perhaps at best a small remnant population of the Atlantic salmon that were once numerous there. Efforts are being made to restore the salmon population in the Annapolis River and its tributaries through research studies and habitat restoration projects.

Having been settled early on by the French and then taken over in the mid-1700s by the English, the community has among the best domestic historical architecture in Canada with fine old homes and gardens overlooking the Annapolis River. Earlier names for Round Hill include Pré Ronde (French, meaning 'round meadow' for its situation in a horseshoe bend in the Annapolis River) and Rosette, the nickname of an Acadian settler.

John Whitman and his sons Elnathan (1785–1868) and Alfred (1797–1861 and grandson George Whitman (born 1823) were farmers and political figures in Nova Scotia born at Rosette (later Round Hill). The Massachusetts Loyalist James De Lancey settled in Round Hill in 1783.
