= François Avard =

Canadian screenwriter

François Avard (born 6 June 1968) is a Canadian writer and scenarist best known as the writer of the Québécois television series Les Bougon.

He attended the He is the creator and co-author (with Jean-Francois Mercier) of the satirical series Les Bougon.

He wrote for multiple French-Canadian series, including Caméra Café, 3X Rien, CA and Bob Gratton. He was a sponsor of the series Ramdam for which he received two Prix Gémeaux in collaboration with writer Fabienne Cortes. He also worked for two seasons of "Ici Louis-José Houde" and the show Pendant ce temps, devant la télé on CBC.

He has been working with comedian Martin Matte since 1995. He also worked with Louis-José Houde to write two of his one-man shows and co-wrote his texts for the animation of the Félix Award. He's also been working with a number of other humorists, including Jean-Francois Mercier, Cathy Gauthier, Patrick Groulx and Pierre Hébert.

On February 25, 2010, François Avard has signed, together with 500 artists, the call to support the international campaign for Boycott, Divestment and Sanctions against Israeli apartheid.

== Novels ==
- L’Esprit de Bottine, Les Intouchables, Montréal, 1991, 262 p. (ISBN 978-2-89549-313-6)
- Les Uniques, Éditions Guérin, Montréal, 1993, 255 p. (ISBN 978-2-89549-255-9)
- Le Dernier Continent, Les Intouchables, Montréal, 1997, 334 p. (ISBN 978-2-89549-167-5)
- Mpambara, y a trop de blanc au Québec, Les 400 Coups, Montréal, 2003, 55 p. (ISBN 2-89540-095-4)
- Pour de vrai, Libre Expression, Outremont, 2003, 312 p. (ISBN 978-276480-100-0)
- Bancs publics, Lanctôt, Montréal, 2006, 197 p. (ISBN 978-2-89485-349-8)
- Avard Chronique, Les Intouchables, Montréal, 2008, 332 p. (ISBN 978-2-89549-313-6)

== Television ==
- 2001: Caméra Café (script adaptation)
- 2001: Ramdam (writer)
- 2002: Real-it (script editor)
- 2003: 3X Rien (script editor)
- 2004: Les Bougon, c'est aussi ça la vie! (co-creator and writer)
- 2005: Ici Louis-José Houde (script editor)
- 2006: CA (script advisor)
- 2007: Bob Gratton: ma vie, my life (script editor)
- 2007: Pendant ce temps, devant la télé (script editor)
- 2009: Vrak la vie (script editor)
- 2009: Bye-Bye 2009 (script editor and writer)
