= Alfred Duclos DeCelles =

Canadian parliamentary librarian

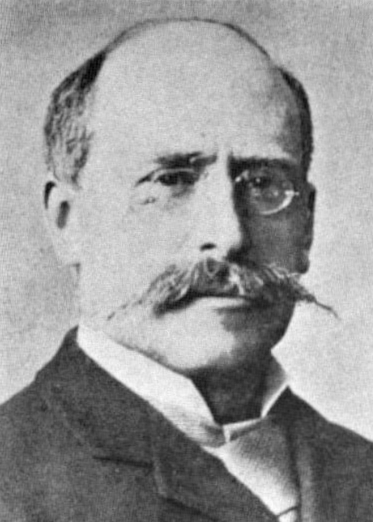
- Born: August 8, 1843; Saint-Laurent, Canada East
- Died: October 5, 1925 (aged 82); Ottawa, Ontario
- Occupations: Journalist, librarian, historian
- Spouse: Eugénie Dorion (m. 1876)
- Writing career
- Period: 19th, 20th century
- Genre: History

Alfred Duclos DeCelles, CMG (August 8, 1843 – October 5, 1925) was a Canadian journalist, writer, lawyer and librarian. For thirty-five years, from 1885 to 1920, he was the head of the Parliamentary Library in Ottawa. He often signed his name as A. D. DeCelles.

== Biography ==
DeCelles was born in Saint-Laurent, Quebec. His parents were Augustin-Candide Duclos DeCelles, a notary, and Marie-Sarah-Anne Holmes. After attending the primary school in his native village, he studied at the Quebec City seminary, where he completed his classical studies. Director of his institution's library, he became editor of the Le Journal de Québec newspaper at the invitation of Joseph-Édouard Cauchon, who was leaving for Europe. An associate from 1867 to 1872, he completed his law studies and was called to the Quebec Bar in 1873. He married Eugénie Dorion in 1876. His son Alfred De Celles is a linguist.

When Antoine Gérin-Lajoie died in 1882, he was replaced as head of the Parliamentary Library by Alpheus Todd, and DeCelles became his assistant. Todd died in 1884. The following year, Decelles was appointed as his successor. He retired in 1920. He was appointed a Companion of the Order of St Michael and St George in 1907.

As Chief Librarian of Parliament, he was not only a public servant, but a scholar. One of the founders of the Club des Dix, he was a contributor to several journals, including L'Opinion publique, La Revue canadienne, La Presse, La Minerve, La Nouvelle-France and Le Canada français.

As a biographer and historian, he wrote the history of the United States and also wrote about Louis-Joseph Papineau, Louis-Hippolyte La Fontaine and Wilfrid Laurier. The quality of his writing was praised by Bishop Amédée Gosselin. At the beginning of the twentieth century, he participated in major projects and wrote articles in the Makers of Canada (21 volumes, 1906–1911) and Canada and Its Provinces (23 volumes, 1913–1917) collections.

After his death on October 5, 1925, in Ottawa at the age of 82, a tribute was paid to him by Georges Pelletier, a journalist with Le Devoir.

== Works ==
- La Crise Du Régime Parlementaire, (1887)
- Papineau - Extraits De Sa Correspondance Intime, (1891)
- Les Hommes Du Jour - A B Routhier, (c. 1891) [with Louis-H Taché]
- Les Hommes Du Jour - Sir Alexandre Lacoste, (c. 1892) [with Louis-H Taché]
- Les Hommes Du Jour - L R Masson, (c. 1892) [with Louis-H Taché]
- Les Etats Unis, (1896)
- Papineau And Cartier, (1900)
- Papineau, (1905)
- La Fontaine, Cartier, (1907)
- The 'Patriotes' Of '37:... The Lower Canada Rebellion, (1916)
- The Constitutions Of Canada, (1918)
- Laurier Et Son Temps, (1920)
- A La Conquête De La Liberté En France Et Au Canada
- The Province Of Quebec From 1867 To Date
- The Habitant In Canada
