= Avard Longley Davidson =

Canadian politician

Avard Longley Davidson (November 2, 1877 – July 1, 1931) was a lawyer and political figure in Nova Scotia, Canada. He represented Annapolis and then Digby and Annapolis in the House of Commons of Canada from 1911 to 1921 as a Conservative.

He was born in Wolfville, Nova Scotia, the son of J.B. Davidson, and was educated at the Horton Academy, Acadia University, and Dalhousie University. Davidson practised law in Middleton, Nova Scotia, also serving as town solicitor. He married Elma J. Armstrong in 1905. He ran unsuccessfully for a seat in the Nova Scotia assembly in 1906 and 1911. Davidson was a member of the Unionist Party from 1917 to 1921. He was defeated when he ran for reelection in 1921. He was named to the Legislative Council of Nova Scotia in 1928 to assist in its abolition. Davidson died in a collision between an automobile and a train at the age of 53.

1911 Canadian federal election: Annapolis
Party	Candidate	Votes
Conservative	Avard Longley Davidson	2,131
Liberal	Samuel Walter Willet Pickup	2,118

Parliament of Canada
Preceded by Samuel Walter Willet Pickup	Member of Parliament for Annapolis; 1911–1917	Succeeded by district abolished
Preceded by district created	Member of Parliament for Digby and Annapolis; 1917–1921	Succeeded by Lewis Johnstone Lovett
