= Frederick M. Pearson =

Canadian politician (1827–1875)

Frederick M Pearson (February 13, 1827 – April 21, 1875) was a Nova Scotia businessman and political figure. He represented Colchester in the House of Commons of Canada as a Liberal member from 1870 to 1874.

He was born in Pictou, Nova Scotia, the son of John Pearson and Esther McElhenny, in 1827. In 1850, he married Eliza Crowe. Pearson operated a business importing and exporting goods, and also built ships at Masstown; he later stopped building ships and moved the importing and exporting business to Truro. He also served as a justice of the peace. He was elected in an 1870 by-election after Adams George Archibald resigned his seat to become Lieutenant-Governor of Manitoba and the Northwest Territories; he was reelected in 1872.

His son, Benjamin later represented Colchester in the Nova Scotia House of Assembly.

By-election on 9 September 1869 On Mr. McLellan being called to the Senate, August 1869
Party	Candidate	Votes
Liberal–Conservative	Adams George Archibald	1,585
Liberal	Frederick M. Pearson	1,230

By-election on 8 November 1870 On Mr. Archibald being appointed Lieutenant-Governor of Manitoba and the Northwest Territories, May 1870
Party	Candidate	Votes
Liberal	Frederick M. Pearson	1,672
Unknown	R. Chambers	268

1872 Canadian federal election: Colchester
Party	Candidate	Votes
Liberal	Frederick M. Pearson	1,634
Unknown	J.F. Blanchard	1,209
Source: Canadian Elections Database

Parliament of Canada
Preceded by Adams George Archibald	Member of Parliament for Colchester; 1870–1874	Succeeded by Thomas McKay
