= Alpheus Todd =

English-born Canadian librarian and constitutional historian

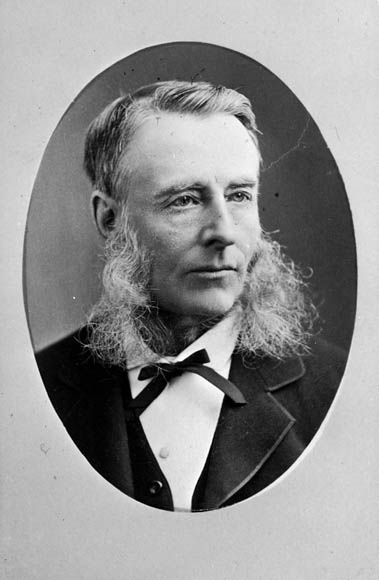
Todd, c. 1867

Alpheus Todd CMG FRSC (July 30, 1821 – January 22, 1884) was an English-born Canadian librarian and constitutional historian, most notable for his publications on parliamentary government.

== Life ==
Todd was born in London, England, the son of an author, Henry Cooke Todd. His family emigrated to York, Upper Canada in 1833. The following year, York was incorporated as the city of Toronto; Todd, though young, produced an Engraved Plan of the City of Toronto, which brought him to the attention of the prominent lawyer, Robert Baldwin Sullivan. In 1835, Sullivan helped Todd obtain employment in the library of the House of Assembly of Upper Canada; in 1836 he became assistant librarian.

Drawing on his experience in the House of Assembly's library and a keen interest in British parliamentary practice and its application in Canada and other British colonies, Todd published The Practice and Privileges of the Two Houses of Parliament in 1840. When, in 1841, Upper and Lower Canada were merged, Todd was appointed assistant librarian to the Legislative Assembly of the united province, which adopted his Practice and Privileges as an official guide for members.

On March 31, 1856, Todd became chief librarian of the Assembly. Upon confederation in 1867, he was appointed librarian to the Dominion Parliament, a position he would hold until his death. Beginning in 1867, he wrote and published his most important work, On Parliamentary Government in England, an epic two-volume treatise on the British constitution and its conventions, including an examination of parliamentary privilege, and a defence of executive authority and the Royal Prerogative. The work was widely acclaimed in Britain and across the Empire, establishing its author as an authority on constitutional matters. The book ran to several editions, and was soon translated into French, German, Spanish, and Italian. Notably, the Parliamentary Library survived "because of the foresight of librarian Alpheus Todd and clerk Connie MacCormac. Todd had insisted to the architect on iron fire doors, and MacCormac ordered the doors to be slammed shut before evacuating.'

In the 1881 Birthday Honours, Todd was created a companion of the Order of St Michael and St George (CMG) on the recommendation of the Marquess of Lorne, and was awarded an honorary LLD by Queen's College, Kingston. He was a founding member of the Royal Society of Canada in 1882.

Todd died suddenly at Ottawa on January 22, 1884.

== Family ==
Todd married Sarah Anne St John in 1845. Together, they had one daughter and four sons, one of whom, Arthur Hamlyn Todd, published second editions of his father's two works on Parliamentary Government, and left an unpublished life of him.

== Selected works ==
- The Practice and Privileges of the Two Houses of Parliament (1840)
- Brief Suggestions in Regard to the Formation of Local Governments for Upper and Lower Canada, in Connection with a Federal Union of the British North American Provinces (1866)
- On Parliamentary Government in England:
  - 1867: Vol. 1, 1869: Vol. 2;
  - 1887: Vol. 1, 1889: Vol. 2.
- The Position of a Constitutional Governor under Responsible Government (1878)
- On Parliamentary Government in the British Colonies (1880)

== Arms ==
Coat of arms of Alpheus Todd
Crest A wolf's head Or collared flory-counter-flory Gules. Escutcheon Sable two bars wavy between three martlets Or on a shield of pretence Argent on a chief Gules two mullets Or (St John).
