= George Whitman (Canadian politician) =

Canadian politician

George Whitman (3 April 1823 - 30 December 1913) was a farmer and political figure in Nova Scotia.

He was born in Rosette (later Round Hill, Nova Scotia), the son of Elnathan Whitman, a Canadian national politician. In 1851, he married Clements Mary Arabella Boice.

== Political life ==
Whitman was appointed the representative of Annapolis County in the Nova Scotia House of Assembly in 1863. Whitman served one term in office before being defeated in the 1867 elections. In 1881, Whitman was named to the provinces' Legislative Council.
