= Library of Parliament =

Library of parliament of Canada in Ottawa

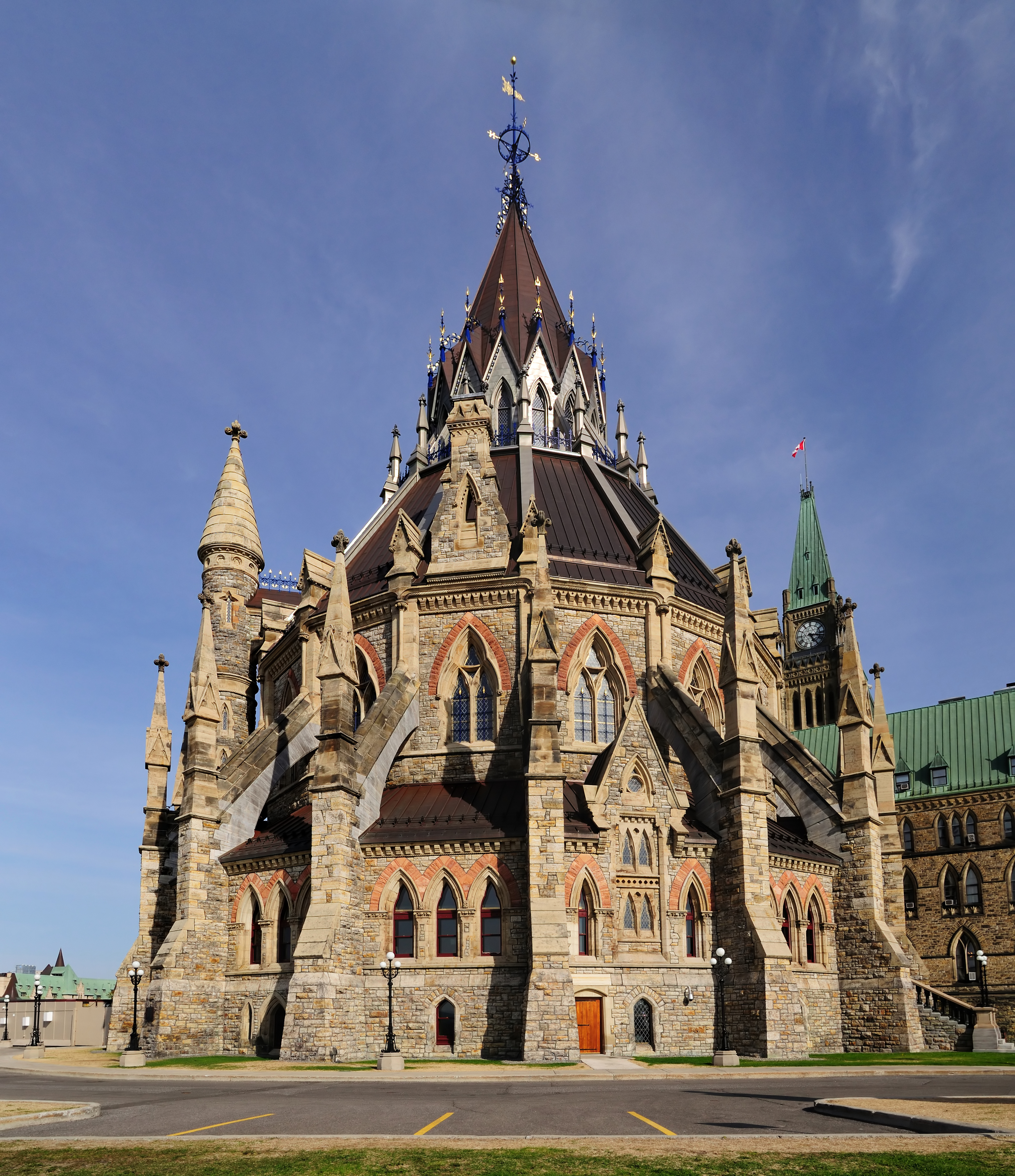
- Library of Parliament, Ottawa
- 45.425466°N 75.700296°W
- Type: Information repository and research resource for the Parliament of Canada
- Established: 1876

Collection
- Size: 650,000 items
- Criteria for collection: Parliamentary business, research publications

Other information
- Director: Christine Ivory
- Employees: 400
- Website: Official website

The Library of Parliament (French: Bibliothèque du Parlement) is the main information repository and research resource for the Parliament of Canada. The main branch of the library sits at the rear of the Centre Block on Parliament Hill in Ottawa, Ontario. The library survived the 1916 fire that destroyed Centre Block. The library has been augmented and renovated several times since its construction in 1876, the last between 2002 and 2006, though the form and decor remain essentially authentic. The building today serves as a Canadian icon, and appears on the obverse of the Canadian ten-dollar bill.

The library closed in 2019 due to the renovation of Centre Block. It will likely not reopen until 2032.

The library is overseen by the Parliamentary Librarian of Canada and an associate or assistant librarian. The Canadian Parliamentary Poet Laureate is considered to be an officer of the library.

== Main branch characteristics ==
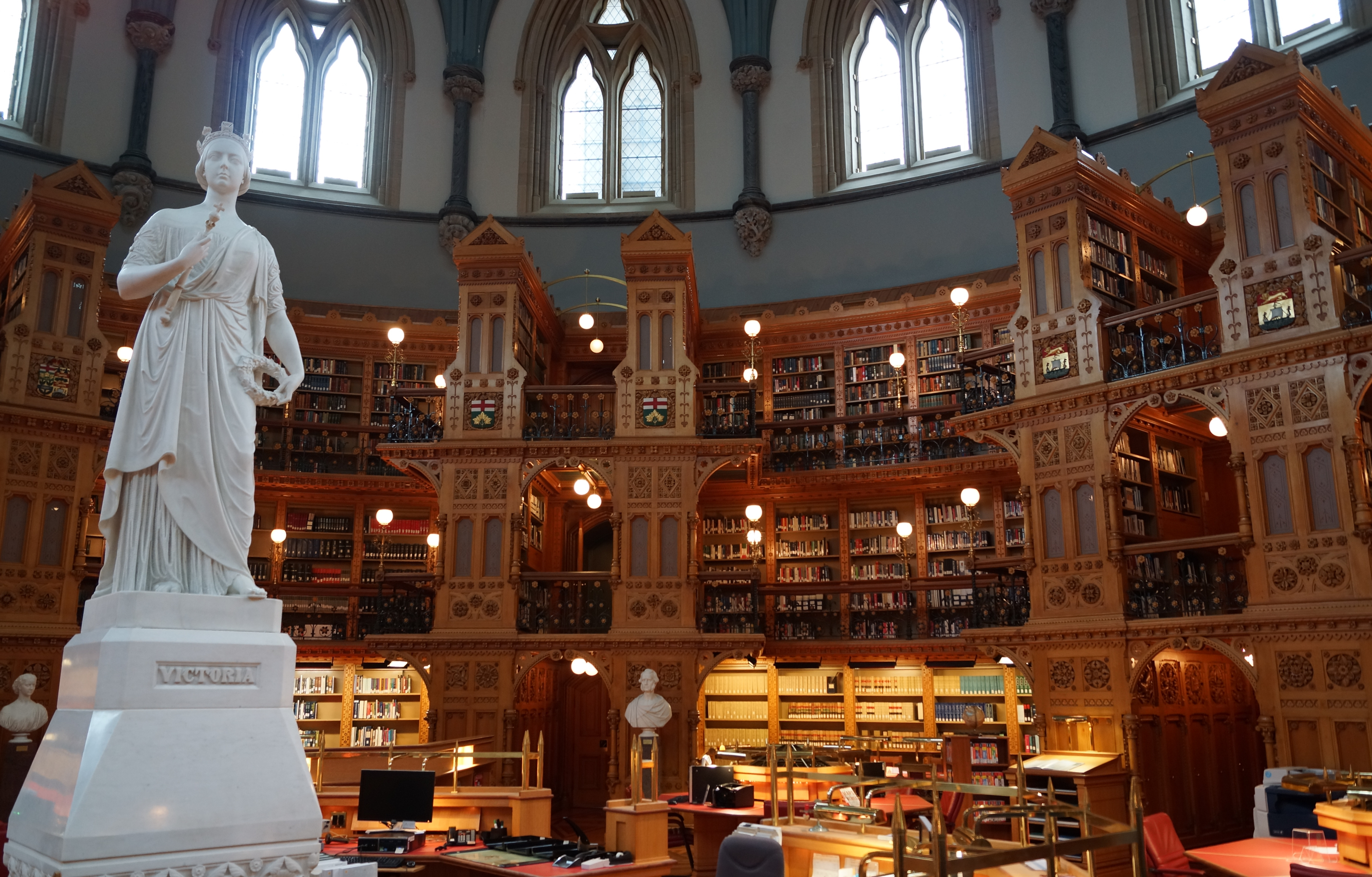
The main reading room of the Library of Parliament

Designed by Thomas Fuller and Chilion Jones, and inspired by the British Museum Reading Room, the building is formed as a chapter house, separated from the main body of the Centre Block by a corridor; this arrangement, as well as many other details of the design, was reached with the input of the then parliamentary librarian, Alpheus Todd. The walls, supported by a ring of 16 flying buttresses, are loadbearing, double-wythe masonry, consisting of a hydraulic lime rubble fill core between an interior layer of dressed stone and rustic Nepean sandstone on the exterior. Around the windows and along other edges is dressed stone trim, along with a multitude of stone carvings, including floral patterns and friezes, keeping with the Victorian High Gothic style of the rest of the parliamentary complex. The roof, set in three tiers topped by a cupola, used to be a timber frame structure covered with slate tiles, but has been rebuilt with steel framing and deck covered with copper. The initial overall combination of colours—grey Gloucester limestone and grey Nepean, red Potsdam and buff Ohio sandstones, as well as purple and green slate banding—conformed to the picturesque style known as structural polychromy.

The main reading room rises to a vaulted ceiling and the walls and stacks are lined with white pine panelling carved into a variety of textures, flowers, masks, and mythical creatures. In the galleries are displayed the coats of arms of the seven provinces that existed in 1876, as well as that of the Dominion of Canada, and standing directly in the centre of the room is a white marble statue of Queen Victoria, sculpted by Marshall Wood in 1871. The northern galleries are also flanked with the white marble busts of Sir John Sandfield Macdonald; Prince Edward, Prince of Wales (later King Edward VII); Alexandra, Princess of Wales (later Queen Alexandra); and Sir Étienne-Paschal Taché.

The library's collection comprises 650,000 items, covering hundreds of years of history and tended by a staff of 300. Access to the facility is generally restricted to those on parliamentary business, but research publications are produced by the library and are available to the public. The main branch on Parliament Hill is only the central hub of a larger complex that spreads to other parliamentary buildings, where services are offered in a number of branch libraries and reading rooms.

== History ==
The Library of Parliament's roots lie in the 1790s, when the legislative libraries of Upper and Lower Canada were created; these operated separately until the creation of the Province of Canada in 1841 and the collections were amalgamated and followed the provincial capital as it moved between Kingston, Montreal, Toronto, and Quebec City. The library was to be established in Ottawa after, in 1867, Queen Victoria chose Bytown as the new seat for her crown in the Dominion of Canada, and the Library of Parliament Act formed the institution in 1871.

Though construction of the present library began in 1859 and the collection arrived in Ottawa in 1866, work was halted in 1861 and was not completed until 1876, when the 47,000 volumes—including several donated by Queen Victoria—were installed. Around 1869, the builders discovered that they didn't have the technical knowledge to build the domed roof, meaning that Thomas Fairbairn Engineering Co. Ltd. of Manchester had to be contracted to provide a prefabricated dome within a few weeks; this gave the Library of Parliament the distinction of being the first building in North America to have a state-of-the-art wrought iron roof. Further, in 1883, the library's 300 gas lights were converted to electricity. However, such additional costs brought the library's price to $301,812, a sum added on top of the total cost for all the parliament buildings, which had already gone far above the original allotted budget. Within only 12 years, the entire roof was stripped of its slate shingles in a tornado that hit Parliament Hill in 1888; since then, the roof has been clad in copper.

The library's contents grew over the next five decades and were saved from the 1916 fire that destroyed the majority of the Centre Block; the building was only connected to the main complex by a single corridor and the library clerk at the time, Michael MacCormac, secured the library's iron doors before the fire could spread into that area. Fire eventually broke out in 1952, in the library's cupola, and caused extensive damage through smoke and water. It was then necessary to perform structural work, as well as to install a replica of the inlaid parquet floor and dismantle the wood panelling and ship it to Montreal for cleaning and partial fireproofing. The Centre, East, and West Blocks subsequently received extensive climate control and electrical upgrades, but the library was largely overlooked.

The deficiencies, plus conservation, rehabilitation, and upgrading, were addressed when a major, $52 million renovation was researched in 1996 and undertaken between 2002 and 2006. Public Works and Government Services Canada contracted the Thomas Fuller Construction Company (operated by the building designer's great-grandsons) to manage a project that fixed leaks in the roof and crumbling mortar in the walls on the exterior, as well as extensive repairs to the wood and plaster work and the installation of climate control systems on the interior. Also done at the time was a nine-metre-deep excavation of the bedrock beneath the library building, in order to provide more storage space, mechanical areas, and a link to an existing loading dock. The project used precision survey, laser measurement, photogrammetry, and the then fledgling technology of Computer Aided Three Dimensional Interactive Application. After four years of work, the library was opened to the public, with tours of the library resuming on 5 June 2006, though Thomas Fuller Construction filed a $21 million lawsuit against the Crown for cost overruns.

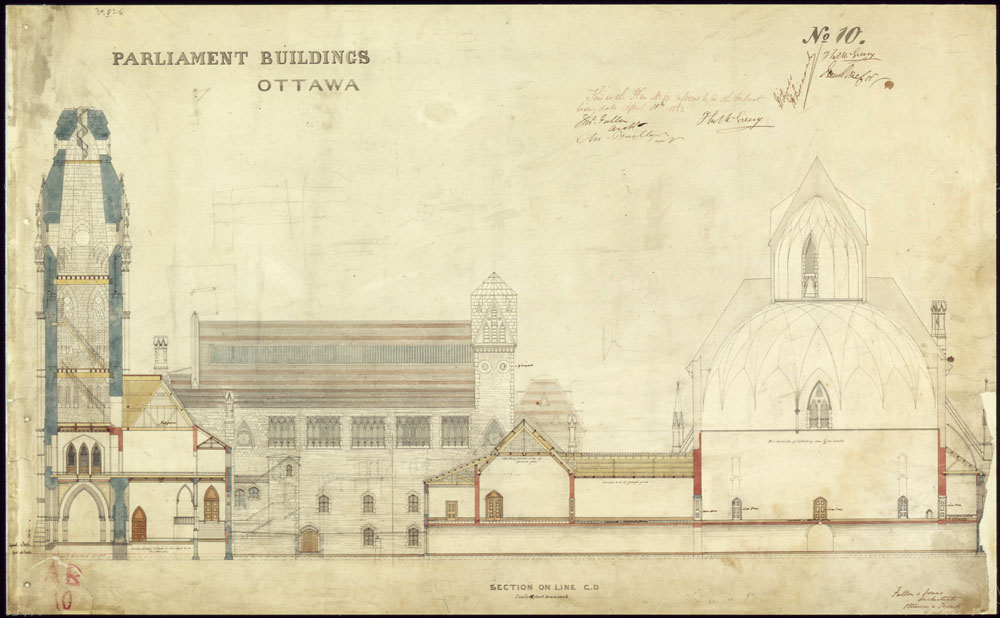
A drafted architectural section of the original Centre Block, showing the Victoria Tower at the far left, and the Library of Parliament to the right

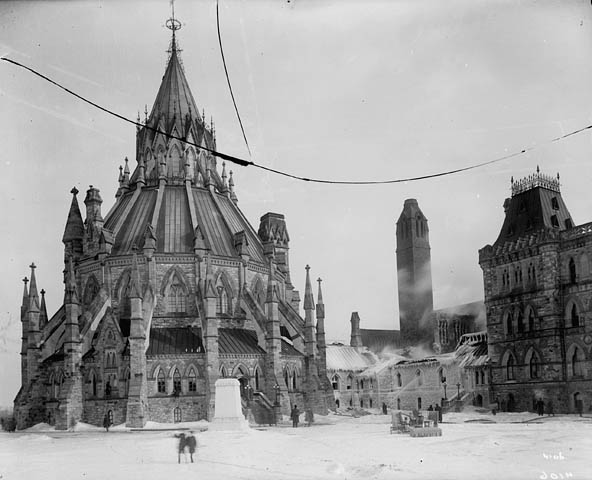
The library of Parliament standing unharmed the day following the fire of 1916

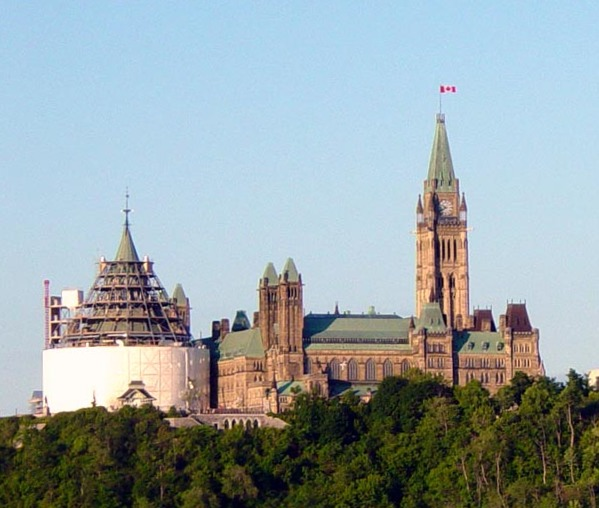
The library undergoing renovations in 2003

== Branches ==
There are several branches of the Library of Parliament that are open for parliamentarians to use. While the clients of the Library are mainly parliamentarians, information can be requested by call or email.

=== 125 Sparks (Former Bank of Nova Scotia) ===
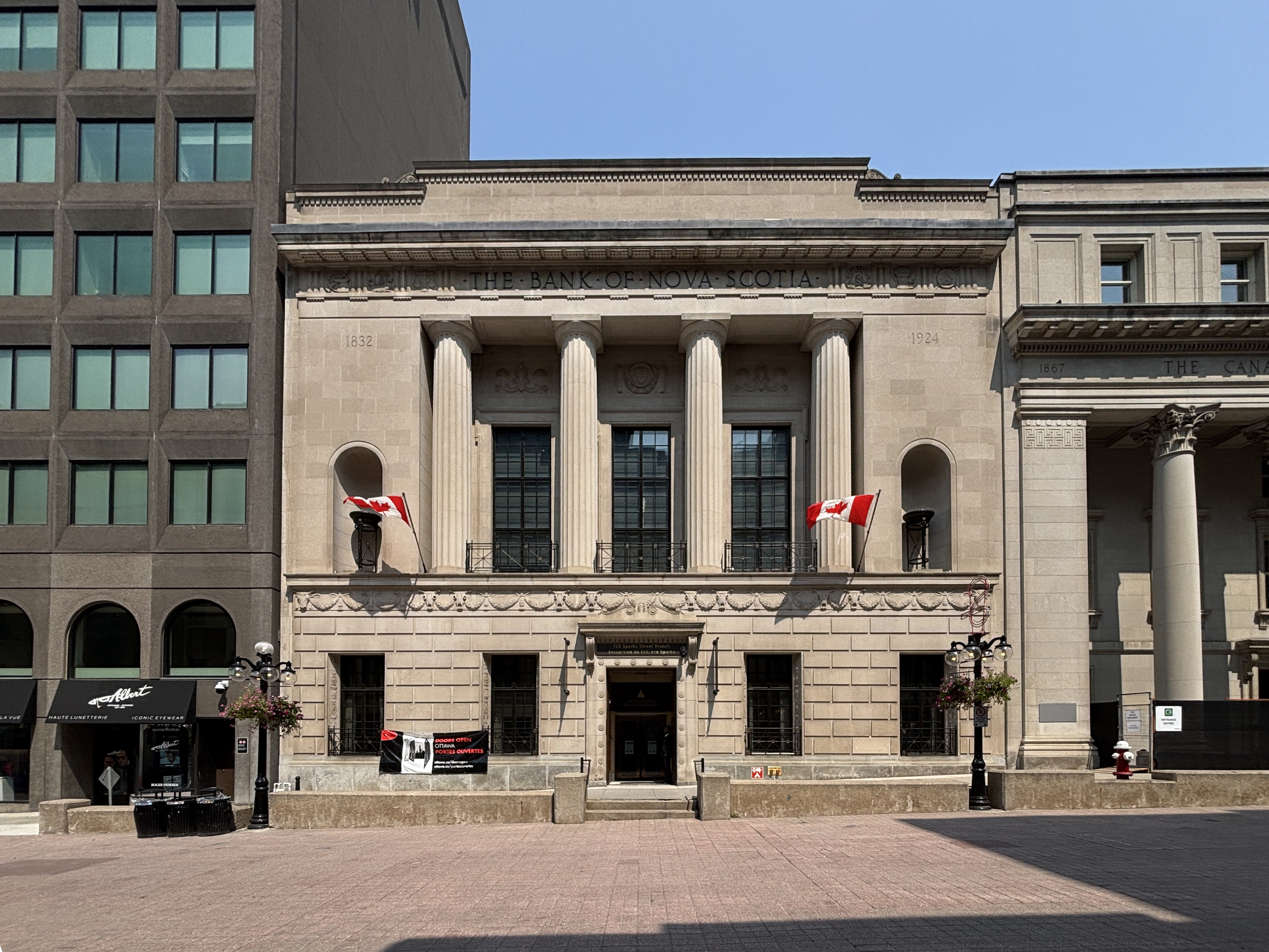
125 Sparks is both the historic Bank of Nova Scotia and currently a Library of Parliament Branch

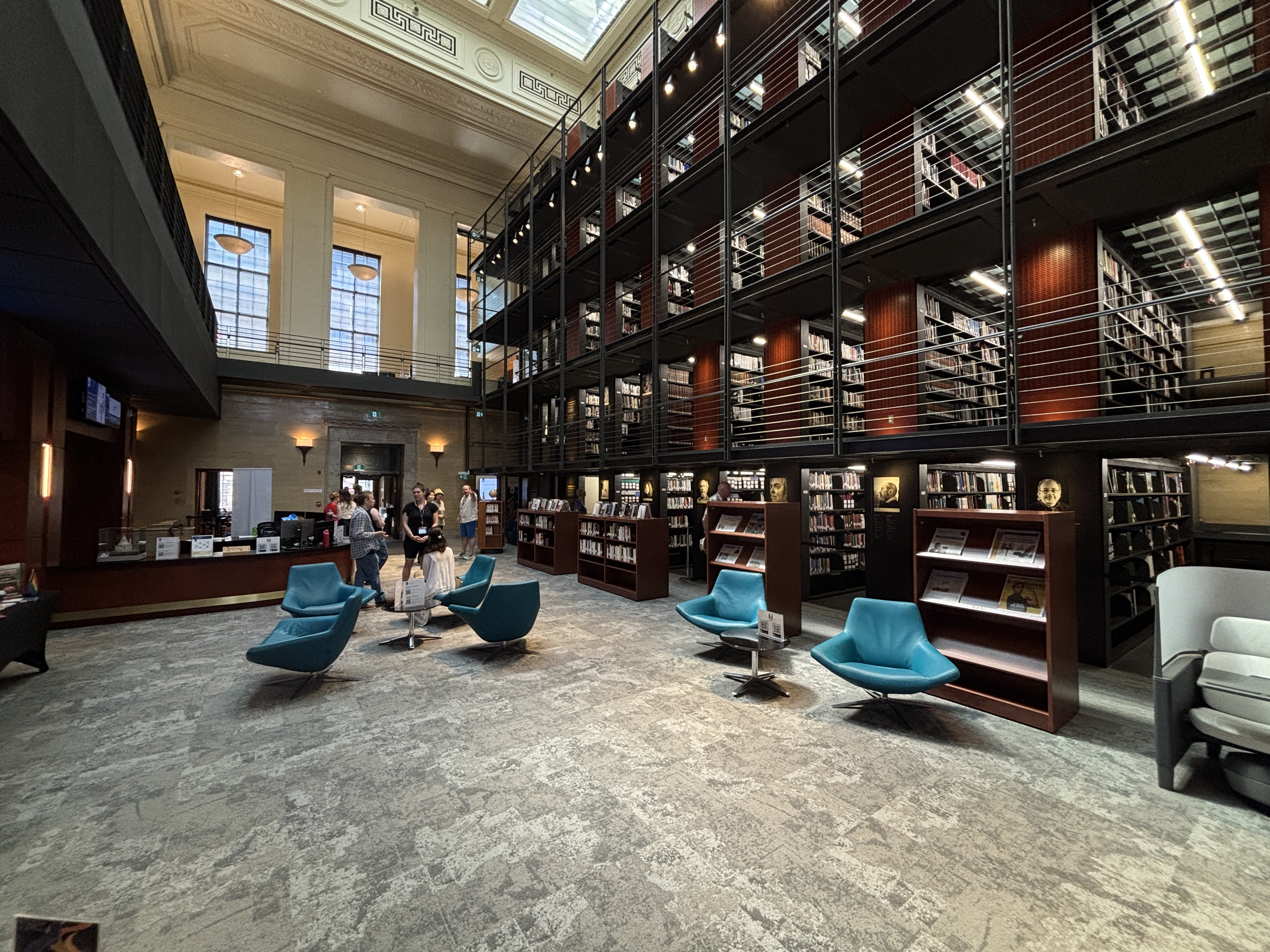
Interior of 125 Sparks

The Sparks Branch of the Library of Parliament was originally built as the Bank of Nova Scotia. Built in 1924, the building was designed by architect John MacIntosh Lyle in a Doric style. In 1999, the Government of Canada approved the bid from Schœler & Heaton Architects and LeMoyne Lapointe Magne Architectes, with renovations beginning one year later, allowing the Library of Parliament to eventually move into the building in 2001. Since 2017, the Sparks Branch serves as the Interim Main Branch, while the Branch in the Centre Block remains empty during renovations.

This Branch also participates in Doors Open Ottawa, where the public can visit and see the interior for themselves.

=== 45 Sacré-Coeur ===
This Branch is not open to the public or to parliamentarians. It is currently acting as a storage facility for the books that cannot be housed the Branch in Centre Block. The Branch helps mainly with preservation of rare books and book binding.

== Parliamentary librarians ==
- 1870–1884: Alpheus Todd
- 1885–1920: Martin Joseph Griffin, Alfred Duclos DeCelles (Griffin and DeCelles shared the post)
- 1920–1938: Martin Burrell
- 1944–1959: Francis Aubrey Hardy
- 1960–1994: Erik John Spicer
- 1994–2005: Richard Paré
- 2005–2011: William R. Young
- 2012–2018: Sonia L'Heureux
- 2018–2024: Heather Lank
- 2024–present: Christine Ivory

== Partnerships and collaboration ==
The Library of Parliament is a member of the Canadian Association of Research Libraries.

== See also ==
- Library and Archives Canada
- New Zealand Parliamentary Library
- House of Commons Library
