= Battle off Liverpool, Nova Scotia (1778) =

1778 battle

Battle of Liverpool, Nova Scotia (1778)
- Part of the American Revolutionary War
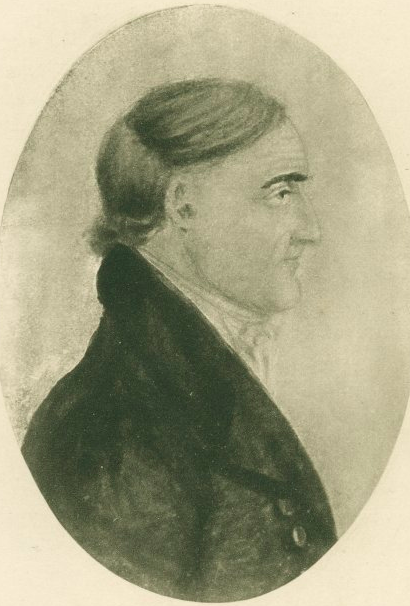
- Colonel of the Militia Simeon Perkins
Date	24 April 1778
Location	off Liverpool, Nova Scotia
Result	British victory

Belligerents
Kingdom of France	Kingdom of Great Britain

Commanders and leaders
(Kingdom of France) Captain Jean Heraud (Herreaud)	(Kingdom of Great Britain) Captain John Milligan

Casualties and losses
"several" killed, wounded, drowned	3 killed

The Battle of Liverpool took place on 24 April 1778 during the American Revolutionary War. The raid involved the British vessel HMS Blonde and the French 24-gun frigate Duc de Choiseul.

== Background ==
During the American Revolution, Americans regularly attacked Nova Scotia by land and sea. American privateers devastated the maritime economy by raiding many of the coastal communities, such as the numerous raids on Liverpool and on Annapolis Royal.

Liverpool's struggle for identity during the revolutionary war has been the subject of considerable study by historians. The town was at first sympathetic to the cause of the American Revolution, with outlying outports like Port Medway and Port Mouton almost continuously visited by American privateers, but after repeated attacks by American privateers on local shipping interests and one direct attack on the town itself, Liverpool citizens turned against the rebellion. The defence of the town and the outfitting of privateers was led by Colonel Simeon Perkins. Captain William Duddingston of HMS Senegal was stationed at Liverpool.

Just off Liverpool, on 26 August 1776, HMS Liverpool (28 guns) captured Warren (ex Hawk), which subsequently served as a tender for HMS Milford and ran aground in a storm near Portsmouth, New Hampshire at the end of December 1776.

The Battle off Port Medway took place on 27 September 1776 during the American Revolutionary War. The American privateer Hannah and Molly (8 guns, 14 men), under the command of Captain Agreen Crabtree, captured five Nova Scotia vessels.

In 1777, Joseph Dexter was imprisoned for helping American Privateers. He later escaped to Boston and was rewarded the expenses he incurred for his support.

== Battle ==
On April 24, 1778, the Royal Navy warship HMS Blonde under the command of Captain John Milligan ran aground the French ship Duc de Choiseul (named after Étienne François, duc de Choiseul) under the command of Captain Jean Heraud in Liverpool Harbour. There was an exchange of cannon fire lasting over three hours. A number of the French crew were killed, drowned and wounded. The 100 remaining French crew were taken prisoner. The arms that were on the wrecked ship continued to attract American privateers over the following month.

Consequently, on May 1, American privateers raided Liverpool, ravaging and pillaging a number of the houses and stores, including the store of Simeon Perkins, a significant town leader. Three weeks later, on May 21, the same privateers returned and tried to tow the wreck of Duc de Choiseul out to sea. Perkins mustered ten men at the shore. Cannon fire was exchanged by the British militia and the American privateers. The privateers continued to fire at the town for almost an hour. Perkins marched his men along the shore, closer to the privateers. One of the militia was wounded in the ensuing exchanges. The privateers stayed off shore for a number of days. Perkins kept a sergeant and six men on guard duty twenty four hours a day until the privateers left the area.

== Aftermath ==
After suffering three years of similar sporadic raids, the people of Liverpool, in June 1779 began re-building Fort Morris (Nova Scotia) and on October 31 launched their own privateer vessel named Lucy to bring battle to their adversaries. As well, Perkins wrote a successful appeal to the authorities in Halifax, and on December 13, 1778 Captain John Howard's company of the King's Orange Rangers arrived aboard the transport Hannah. The company consisted of Howard, 2 lieutenants, 1 ensign, 3 sergeants, 2 or 3 corporals, 48 privates, and several camp followers, both women and children.

On 22 June 1778, American privateers captured a small schooner of Major Studholm that was en route from St. John to Annapolis. Captured were one Sergeant and eight soldiers from the Royal Fencible American Regiment and the Royal Nova Scotia Volunteer Regiment.

Another privateer raid on Liverpool occurred on September 13, 1780. Two American privateers, Surprize under Captain Benjamin Cole, and Delight, under Captain Lane, unloaded nearly 70 men at Ballast Cove shortly after midnight. By 4am they had captured the fort and taken Howard, two other officers, and all but six of the KOR garrison as prisoners. Perkins called out the militia, engineered the capture of Cole, and negotiated with Lane for the recovery of the fort and the release of the prisoners. Within a few hours "every thing [was] restored to its former Situation without any Blood Shed." Liverpool was not bothered by privateers for the remainder of the war.

American privateers remained a threat to Nova Scotian ports for the rest of the war. For example, after a failed attempt to raid Chester, Nova Scotia, American privateers struck again in the Raid on Lunenburg in 1782.

== See also ==
- American Revolution - Nova Scotia theatre
- Military history of Nova Scotia
