= Samuel Bayard =

Officer, King's Orange Rangers

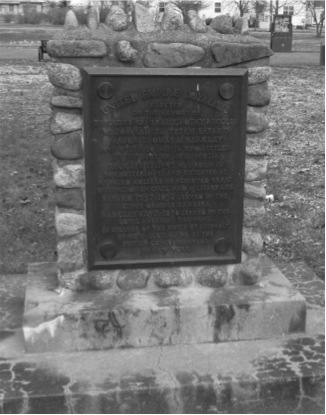
Monument to Samuel Bayard of the King's Orange Rangers, Middleton Park, Middleton, Nova Scotia, Canada

Lieutenant Colonel Samuel Vetch Bayard (born 1757, New York – d. 28 May 1832 Wilmot, Nova Scotia) was a Loyalist military officer in the American Revolution who served in the King's Orange Rangers (KOR). He is the son of William Bayard who founded the KOR. He was the great-grandson of Governor Samuel Vetch and was the father of Robert Bayard.

== Career ==
Coat of Arms of Samuel Bayard

In March 1778, Lt. Col. Samuel Bayard was charged with murdering one of his own officers in the ranger unit. Bayard was tried and found guilty of manslaughter in October, and sentenced to be suspended for three months and then removed from his command. This sentence was overturned on a technicality by the Judge Advocate General, but probably played a role in Bayard's subsequent difficulties in retaining his command.

On November 17, 1778 the KOR arrived by sea at Halifax, Nova Scotia. The reason for the transfer was probably to stem the rate of desertion by relocating the men to a place much farther away from their homes. The KOR was assigned to protect the Eastern Battery on the shore of Halifax harbour at the north end of Eastern Passage, where the community of Imperoyal now exists.

At the end of 1779, Lt. Col. Bayard learned of a plan to merge the KOR with the Royal Fencible Americans, which would entail Bayard losing his command. He wrote in protest to Brig. Gen. Francis McLean (British army officer), noting that he had already given up his commission with the 60th Regiment of Foot, and that the KOR currently had more men than the RFA. He wrote a similar letter to Sir Henry Clinton, the British C-in-C in North America. Clinton decided not to proceed with the plan at that time, but Bayard's position remained insecure.

=== Liverpool ===
In the 1770s, Liverpool was the second-largest settlement in Nova Scotia, after Halifax. Unlike Halifax, nearly everyone in Liverpool was a New England Planter. The town was at first sympathetic to the cause of the American Revolution, with outlying outports like Port Medway and Port Mouton almost continuously visited by American privateers, but after repeated attacks by American privateers on local shipping interests and one direct attack on the town itself, Liverpool citizens turned against the rebellion. Simeon Perkins wrote a successful appeal to the authorities in Halifax, and on December 13, 1778 Capt. John Howard's company of the Samuel Bayard regiment arrived aboard the transport Hannah. The company consisted of Howard, 2 lieutenants, 1 ensign, 3 sergeants, 2 or 3 corporals, 48 privates, and several camp followers, both women and children. During the next year the men assisted the locals in re-building Fort Morris (Nova Scotia) at what is today called Fort Point.

=== Port Williams ===
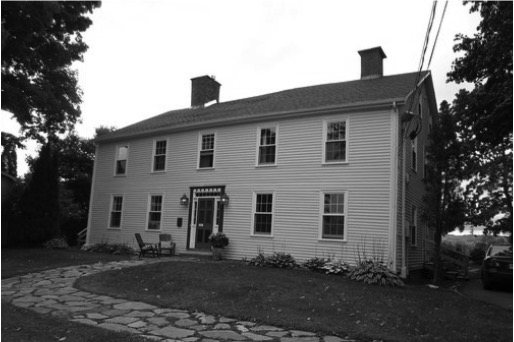
Fort Hughes, Starr's Point, Nova Scotia

At Port Williams, Nova Scotia, the threat of American privateer attacks had subsided. In the spring of 1781, Major Samuel Bayard was ordered to take a detachment of Rangers overland from Halifax to Fort Hughes (Nova Scotia) to overawe local Planters who were planning to erect a Liberty Pole and thereby break with the King. There they fixed bayonets and "with bright weapons glittering, colours flying and drums beating, they marched up Church Street and back to Town Plot, where the barracks stood." This show of force brought the locals back in line. Bayard took an interest in the Annapolis Valley, and after the war he took up a grant of 4,730 acres at Wilmot Mountain. The reputation of the Regiment grew in these later years. A few months before disbandment, Brigadier-General Henry Edward Fox expressed:

... the great satisfaction he has received in seeing the two provincial battalions of Royal N.S. Volunteers and the King's Orange Rangers, and highly approves of their discipline and military appearance ...

The King's Orange Rangers were disbanded in the autumn of 1783.

After the war Bayard was granted land in Aylesford, which he sold off and purchased land in Wilmot. Bayard became a Lieutenant Colonel of the Duke of Kent's regiment, the Royal Nova Scotia Regiment (1793 – 1802). He is buried in the Bayard Family Cemetery in South Farmington, Wilmot, Nova Scotia, Canada.

== Legacy ==
- namesake of Bayard Road, Wilmot, Nova Scotia

== See also ==
- Nova Scotia in the American Revolution
