= Robert Bayard =

Robert Bayard (1788 – 4 June 1868) was a medical doctor and writer from New Brunswick, Canada. His son, William Bayard, also became a medical doctor and practiced in Saint John, New Brunswick with his father.

Robert Bayard was the son of Colonel Samuel Bayard of the King's Orange Rangers and was from a prominent New York City family before the American War of Independence. After the war, his father settled at Wilmot, Nova Scotia. Robert studied medicine and became a doctor and professor of obstetrics at the College of Physicians and Surgeons in the University of the State of New York. The War of 1812 caused him to return to Canada.

A prominent member of the province's medical profession at the time, Bayard wrote:

- Exposition of facts relative to a case of croup (1826)
- Evidences of the delusions of homoeopathy (1857)

both published in Saint John, New Brunswick. The latter publication stirring significant controversy. He also denounced Tractarian influences in the Church of England in A statement of facts, as they occurred at the late annual meeting of the Diocesan Church Society published in 1849.

Bayard helped establish the route of the European and North American Railway between Saint John and Shediac. He died on his farm near Welsford. The nearby train station was known for some years as Bayard.

== Publications ==
- A statement of facts, as they occurred at the late annual meeting of the Diocesan Church Society. 1849
