= Expedition to the Chesapeake =

Expedition to the Chesapeake may refer to

- Expedition to the Chesapeake (1777), a British military expedition during the American War of Independence, under the command of Lord William Howe
- Expedition to the Chesapeake (1813), a British military expedition during the War of 1812
