= HMS Blonde (1760) =

Warship of the British Royal Navy

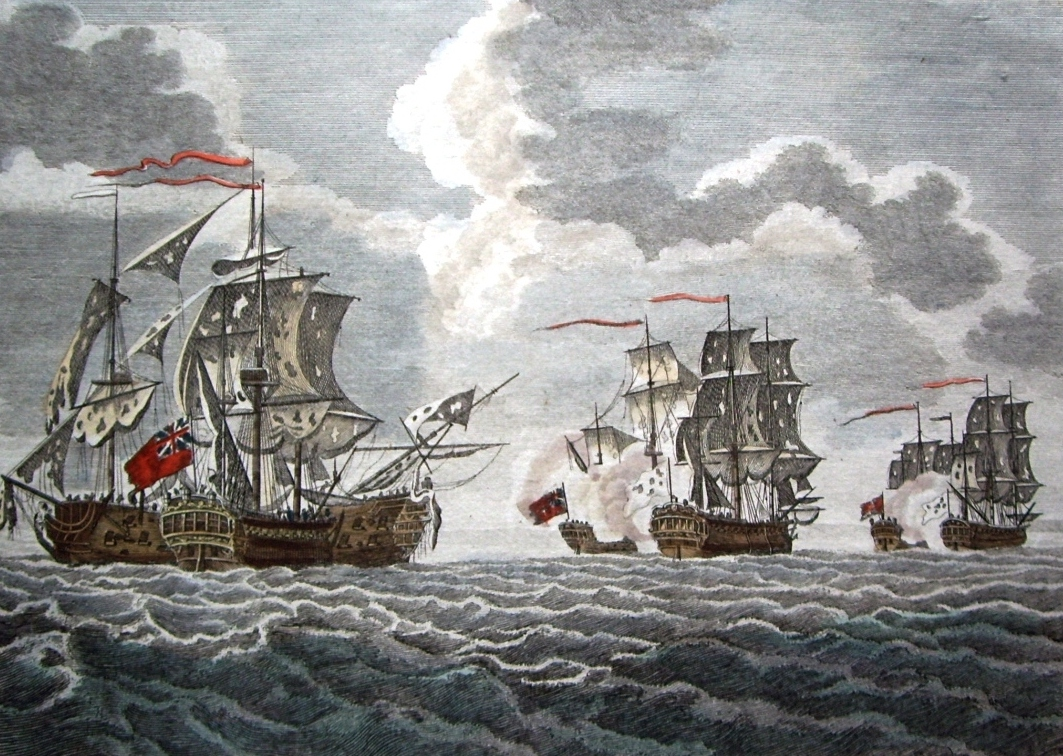
Blonde at the Battle of Bishops Court

HMS Blonde was a 32-gun fifth-rate frigate of the Royal Navy. She was originally the French frigate Blonde, captured by the British during the 1760 Battle of Bishops Court. Blonde was wrecked on Blonde Rock, Nova Scotia with American prisoners of war (POW) on board in 1782. The American privateers Noah Stoddard and Daniel Adams rescued the POW and let the British crew go free. Their decision created an international stir. Upon returning to Boston, Adams was banished for letting go the crew and he and his family became Loyalist refugees in Nova Scotia.

== Career ==
On 24 February 1760, during the Seven Years' War, a British squadron, under Captain John Elliot in HMS Aeolus, met a French squadron under Captain François Thurot, who was aboard the French frigate Maréchal de Belleisle. In the subsequent Battle of Bishops Court, the British captured Maréchal de Belleisle (after Thurot was killed), Terpsichore, and Blonde. The Royal Navy took the latter two into service. It was named for its figurehead, in the form of a "large and shapely female in extreme décolletage," whose hair was painted blonde.

American Revolution: On 17 December, 1777 she recaptured brig "Brothers" in Casco Bay, Brothers had been captured on 12 December. On 6 April 1778 Blonde recaptured brigantine "Lord Dungannon" at (42°12′N 67°00′W). She participated in the Battle off Liverpool, Nova Scotia, 24 April 1778. On 30 May 1778 she captured Massachusetts privateer brigantine Washington south of Cape Sable Island. 5 June, 1778 she captured the sloop "Amity" and a schooner. On 12 June 1778 under command of Captain John Milligan she captured brig "Sally" off Seale Island, Nova Scotia. On 16 June captured French brig Marie Catherine 8-9 leagues northwest of Cape Ann. In 1779, Blonde, under the command of Andrew Barkley from Halifax Station, captured the Resolution, under the command of Abel Gore, off Halifax, and the crew were imprisoned there. She participated in the Penobscot Expedition of 1779, capturing, with HMS Virginia, the privateer "Hampden".

On 25 January 1781, Blonde, Otter, and Delight, as well as some smaller vessels, carried 300 troops from Charleston to the Cape Fear River. The troops, together with 80 marines, temporarily occupied Wilmington, North Carolina, on 28 January. The object of the expedition was to establish sea communications with Lord Cornwallis and provide a base for the army, which was moving north.

== Fate ==
Blonde was wrecked on Blonde Rock, Nova Scotia on 21 January 1782. The 60 American prisoners on board HMS Blonde made their way to Seal Island, Nova Scotia. American privateer Noah Stoddard in the Scammell reluctantly allowed the British crew to go free and return to Halifax in HMS Observer, which was involved in the Naval battle off Halifax en route.

== Legacy ==
- Namesake of Blonde Rock, Nova Scotia

== See also ==
- American Revolution – Nova Scotia theatre
