= Fort Hughes (Nova Scotia) =

18th-century fortification

Coordinates: 45°06′17″N 64°23′01″W

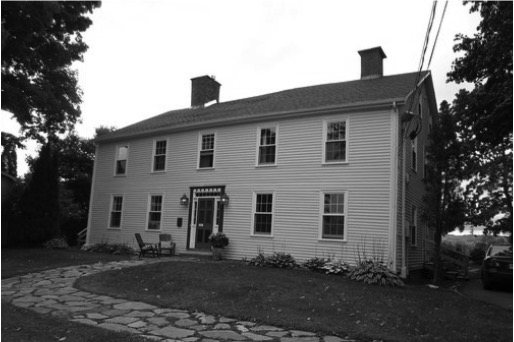
Fort Hughes, Starr's Point, Nova Scotia

Fort Hughes (also known as the Planters Barracks) was a fortification that was built at present-day Starr's Point, Nova Scotia during the American Revolution to protect against raids by American privateers. The fortification was named after the Governor of Nova Scotia Sir Richard Hughes, 2nd Baronet who had the fortification built on a piece of land belonging to Samuel Starr, a Planter from Norwich, Connecticut and militia officer. Three months after a privateer raid on the Cornwallis river, the Barracks was built in 1778 beside the militia parade ground at Starr's Point. 56 troops were stationed there. The King's Orange Rangers were stationed at the fortification during the Revolution. The Rangers were sent to the area, in part, to ensure that the Planters remained loyal to the King.

In the spring of 1781, Major Samuel Bayard led the King's Orange Rangers from Halifax to Fort Hughes to overawe local Planters who were planning to erect a Liberty Pole and thereby break with the King. There they fixed bayonets and "with bright weapons glittering, colours flying and drums beating, they marched up Church Street and back to Town Plot, where the barracks stood." This show of force brought the locals back in line. Bayard took an interest in the Annapolis Valley, and after the war he took up a grant of 4,730 acres at Wilmot Mountain.

Fort Hughes was one of a chain of fortifications that created a courier route that started from Citadel Hill at Halifax, Nova Scotia, to Fort Edward (Nova Scotia), then Fort Hughes, Fort Anne at Annapolis Royal and then to Fort Howe at Saint John, New Brunswick, and then onward to Quebec.

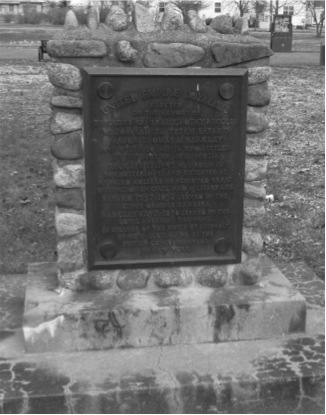
Monument to Samuel Bayard of the King's Orange Rangers, Middleton Park, Middleton, Nova Scotia, Canada

The building survives today as one of the oldest in Nova Scotia. In 2016, archeologist Arron Taylor found rich artifacts on the property from the American Revolution time period.

Jack Merriott, the customs broker in Port Williams, lived here between 1928 and 1988, when he was 100 years old, until it became an Inn.

== See also ==
- American Revolution - Nova Scotia theatre
- List of oldest buildings in Canada
- Military history of Nova Scotia
