= Royal Nova Scotia Regiment =

Royal Nova Scotia Regiment of Foot
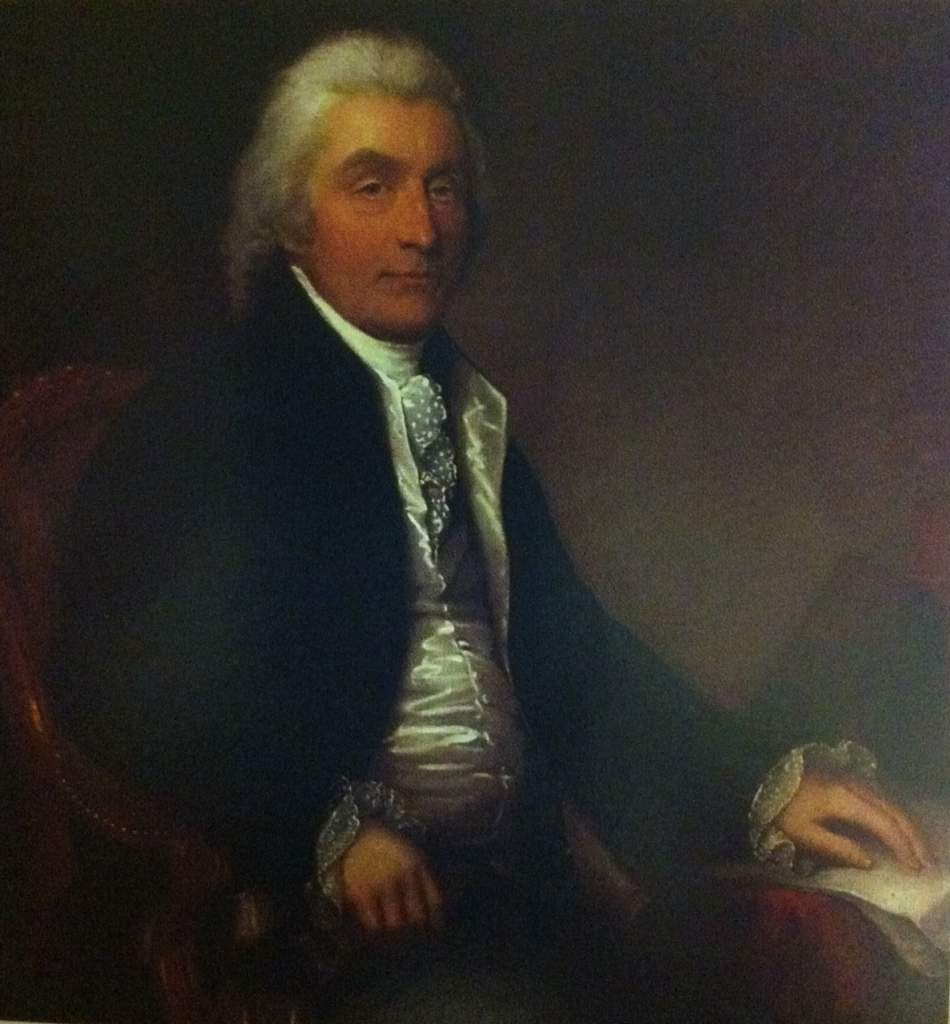
- Col. John Wentworth
- Active: 1793–1802
- Country: Great Britain; United Kingdom
- Allegiance: King George III
- Branch: Provincial corps, North American command
- Type: Battalion
- Role: Infantry
- Size: 6 companies, rising to 8 companies
- Garrison/HQ: Halifax, Nova Scotia (Fort Sackville); St. John's, Colony of Newfoundland; Annapolis Royal; Windsor (Fort Edward); Sydney, Nova Scotia
- Engagements: Saw only minor combat

Commanders
- Notable commanders: Sir John Wentworth, 1st Baronet

The Royal Nova Scotia Regiment (Nova Scotia Fencibles) was a battalion of infantry raised in 1793 to defend British interests in the colony of Nova Scotia during the Wars of the French Revolution. The unit was commanded by Colonel John Wentworth, the lieutenant-governor of the colony, throughout its existence. The Royal Nova Scotia Regiment (RNSR) had an undistinguished history through most of its existence, and saw very limited action, mostly in the role of marines, but did play an important role in the defense of Nova Scotia during these wars.

== Formation ==
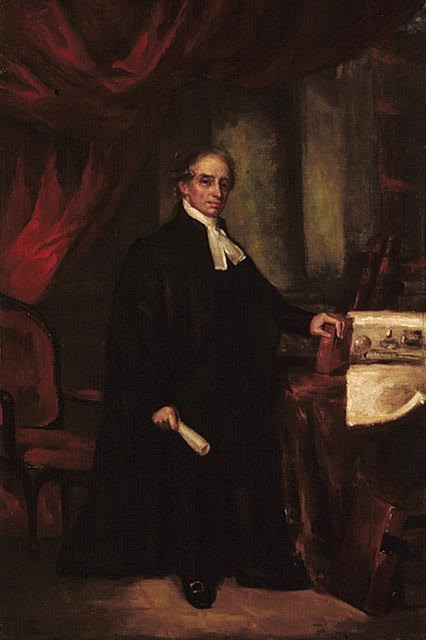
Brenton Halliburton - only know portrait of someone in the regiment

As tensions rose between the governments of Britain and Revolutionary France in early 1793, the British secretary of state for the colonies, Henry Dundas, wrote to Wentworth that the question of raising a provincial regiment for the defense of Nova Scotia was under consideration. In April, word arrived in Halifax, also from Dundas, that war had been declared, that all but 200 men of the British garrison were to be sent to the West Indies, that the militia was to be called out, and that Wentworth was to commence raising a provincial regiment of six companies (600 men). In spite of having no military experience, Wentworth was to be colonel of the regiment. The regiment was to serve as a Fencible unit, for local defense only. The men were to be paid and equipped like regular soldiers; they would be, in effect, a full-time home guard. In October Wentworth was directed to raise the establishment to eight companies (800 men), although the regiment would not, in the event, ever reach this strength, and further ordered that the regiment might be called on to serve in the other North American colonies, to which the men assented.

Wentworth went to work on this project with enthusiasm. Winckworth Tonge, Jr., formerly adjutant of the 60th Reg't. of Foot as well as an officer of the Royal Fencible Americans and the 22nd Reg't. of Foot, was appointed as adjutant, and recruiting began on April 14. By May 28, 350 men had been enlisted. Wentworth was keen to have his regiment given the prefix "Royal" (probably based on the precedent of the Royal Nova Scotia Volunteer Regiment of the Revolutionary War), and in October Dundas granted this, but "without special sanction".

Many of the officers of the RNSR were veterans of the earlier war, or sons of veterans. For example, Samuel Bayard, named as lieutenant colonel en second, had served as a captain in the King's Orange Rangers. Major George H. Monk and Captains Jones Fawson and John Solomon had held the same ranks in the Royal Nova Scotia Volunteers, while Captain Hector Maclean had served with the 84th Highlanders.

There was a labour shortage in Nova Scotia at that time, and many Halifax merchants, led by John Butler Butler, began to protest to Wentworth that his recruiting efforts were driving up wages. This opposition soon collapsed when the merchants began to realize the lucrative contracts that the war effort was bringing; Butler even had the effrontery to apply to Dundas for a contract to supply the regiment. Wentworth also faced difficulties from Major General Ogilvie, the commander of the regular garrison, who refused his requests for barrack space, clothing and provisions, while at the same time using Wentworth's men for three-quarters of the garrison's duties and as a source of recruits for his own 4th Reg't. of Foot. This state of affairs was finally ended in May 1794 with the arrival of Prince Edward, the Duke of Kent, to take over as commander-in-chief of the King's Forces in Nova Scotia and New Brunswick. Wentworth and the Prince were to form a friendship over the coming years, much to the benefit of the RNSR.

== Service ==
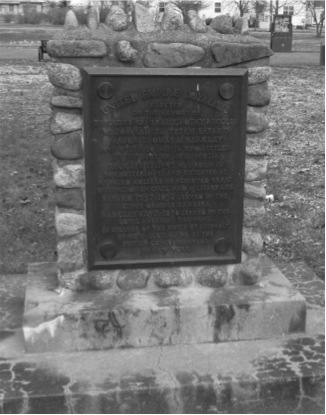
Monument to Lieutenant Colonel Samuel Bayard, RNSR, Middleton Park, Middleton, Nova Scotia, Canada

During its existence the RNSR had its headquarters in Halifax, where it assisted in doing garrison duty, and had small parties in all of the outposts in the neighbourhood and in other parts of the province. A fairly large detachment, successively under command of Captain Maclean, Captain Aldridge, and Lieutenant Van Cortlandt, was at St. John's, Newfoundland from August 1794 until November 1795, assisting in the raising and the training of the Royal Newfoundland Regiment. Other detachments were at Annapolis Royal, Windsor, and Sydney. For a short while a guard was posted at Parrsboro, to protect the north end of the ferry link across Minas Basin from Windsor to Partridge Island, the fastest route at the time from Halifax to New Brunswick.

As of July 1, 1797, the officers and men of the RNSR were distributed as follows:

- At Halifax (Citadel Hill and HQ) – 66
- At Prince Edward's quarters at Birch Cove – 42
- At Eastern Battery – 96
- At George's Island – 77
- At Point Sandwich (York Battery) – 91
- At Point Pleasant Battery – 50
- At Northwest Arm Battery – 23
- At Kavenaugh's (Melville) Island – 16
- At Fort Sackville – 34
- At Windsor (Fort Edward) – 31
- At Annapolis Royal (Fort Anne) – 31
- Aboard the Earl of Moira, as marines – 36
- At Duncan's Cove (Chebucto Head) – 7
- At Sambro Lighthouse – 4
- On leave – 2
- Orderlies at Regimental Hospital – 2
- Telegraph (semaphore) men on Citadel Hill – 2
- King's workmen at Halifax – 5

for a total of 618, of which 527 were other ranks. There were wanting 273 to complete the establishment.

A detachment of 40–50 men was always stationed the Prince's residence as a sort of guard of honour. The men posted at Sambro, Duncan's Cove, and the two men at the Citadel operated the semaphore telegraph that the Prince established to relay messages from the mouth of the harbour to his headquarters; it was the first of its kind in North America. The men at Kavenaugh's Island guarded French prisoners from La Felix, a ship captured at St. Domingo in 1794; the island was renamed in honour of Dundas (Lord Melville) after the war. A rotation of men, from 14 to 36 at a time, served as marines aboard His Majesty's armed snow Earl of Moira, a vessel of 14 guns in the pay of the province, commanded by Captain Fawson. These were probably the only men of the Regiment to see combat.

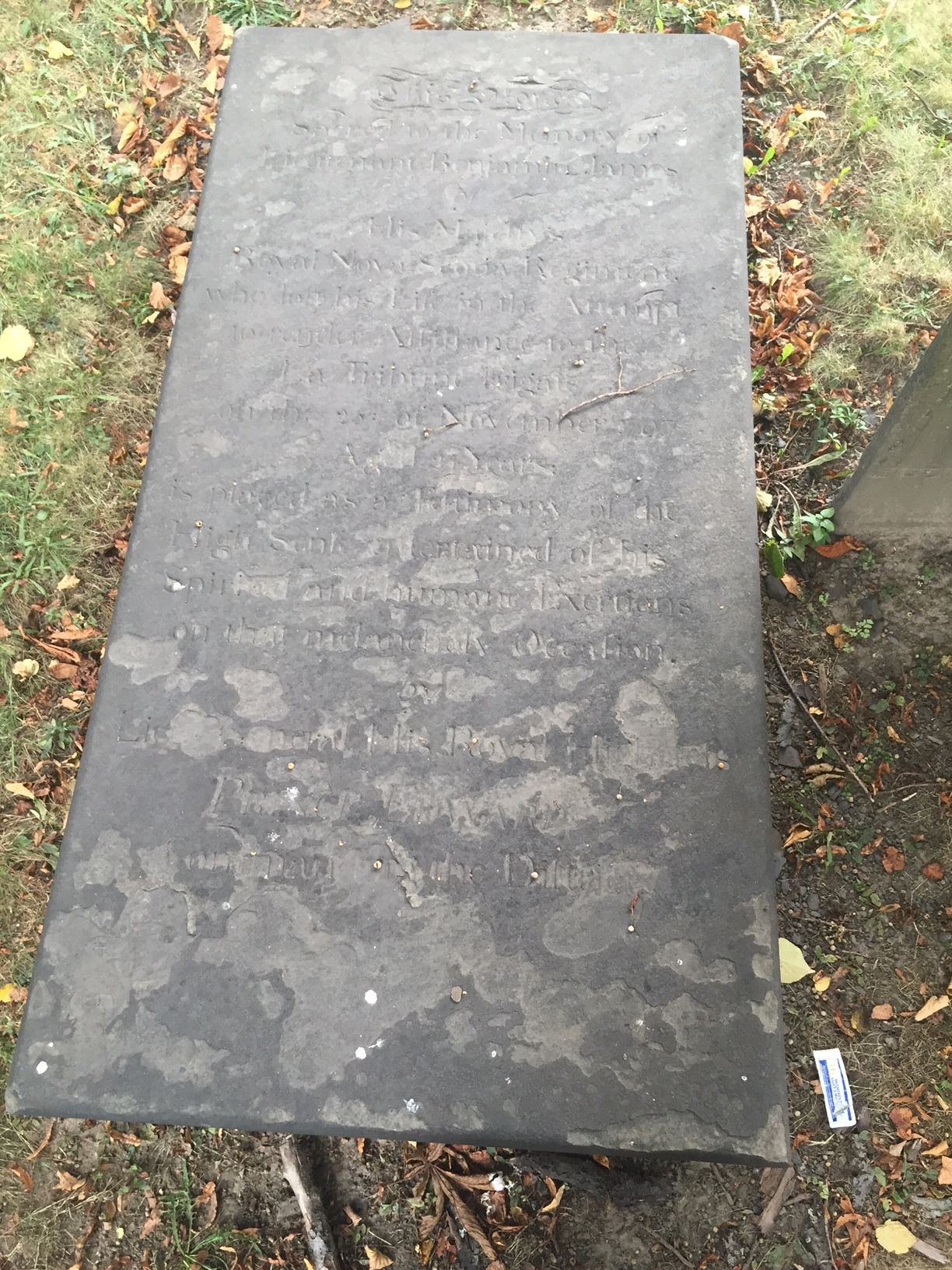
Lt. Benjamin James, Royal Nova Scotia Regiment, Old Burying Ground (Halifax, Nova Scotia), died while trying to rescue those who died in HMS Tribune in 1797; commemorated by Prince Edward

Prince Edward took almost as much pride in the regiment as Wentworth did. However, he also saw it as a source of recruits for his own 7th Reg't. of Foot (Royal Fusileers). Already in 1795 he had persuaded several officers of the RNSR to take up commissions in the 7th of Foot, and he later decided on a plan to draft into his own regiment the best men of the RNSR in exchange for some poor-quality recruits he had received from Britain. Wentworth was horrified, in part because the Prince was known as a very severe disciplinarian. He wrote in protest to the Duke of Portland, who sent a mild reprimand to the Prince ordering him not to use the RNSR as a "nursery or recruiting fund," because the men had enlisted as fencibles. Fear of being drafted into the Fusileers caused recruiting to dry up for several months. The Prince did throw his influence behind Wentworth's persistent efforts to have the regiment placed on the British Army's regular establishment, which would have, among other things, secured a colonel's salary for Wentworth, but these efforts came to nothing.

On November 16, 1797, the frigate HMS Tribune was wrecked during a southerly gale off Herring Cove. Lieutenant Benjamin James, Sergeants William Mullens and Sniffen Baker, and Privates Michael Brown, Cornelius Kenrick, John Bush and William Barry, all of the RNSR, were drowned attempting to rescue the crew of Tribune. It is said that the Prince, in referring to Lieutenant James, stated that "the flower of my regiment is gone."

== Disbandment ==
The Royal Nova Scotia Regiment was disbanded at Halifax on August 24, 1802, following the Treaty of Amiens. Wentworth's biographer, Brian C. Cuthbertson, sums up the regiment's service as follows:

At a time when Nova Scotians needed patriotic symbols and reassurance in the face of threatened attack, the Royal Nova Scotia Regiment filled a vital need and did so most commendably. It was a fine body of men, well officered, and one in which Wentworth and all Nova Scotians took pride.

By the end of October, those men who wished had been given land grants in various districts of the province. Many of the officers and men would go on to do further service in the Nova Scotia Regiment of Fencible Infantry, which was raised in July 1803, after the renewal of the war with France. One of these officers was Henry Newton (officer) who joined the 32nd Regiment of Foot at the request of the Duke of Kent. Newton was killed in the Battle of Salamanca.

== Uniforms ==
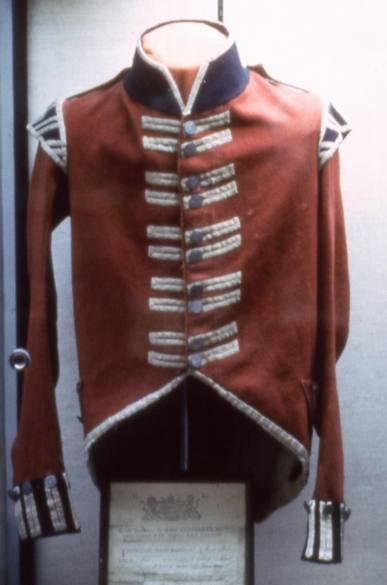
Royal Nova Scotia Regiment uniform coatee

At the time of their enlistment, the men of the RNSR mostly wore civilian clothing, essentially, whatever they were wearing when enlisted. Wentworth's difficulties with Ogilvie delayed the outfitting of the regiment with proper uniforms, although Wentworth had ordered them from England in May 1793, asking Captain Stewart of the Life Guards to advise and aid "in the fashion and selection of them." With the arrival of Prince Edward in 1794, the regiment was soon fully clothed.

Remarkably, a uniform coatee of a man of the RNSR still exists. This coatee is one of the earliest surviving military uniforms known to exist in Canada, and is currently held at the Army Museum at the Halifax Citadel. It confirms that the RNSR wore red coats with royal blue facings, with plain white lace for other ranks, and buttons in pairs. Given the wings on the shoulders, this would have been the coatee of a man of the grenadier or the light infantry company. This uniform would have been worn circa 1798.
