= Battle of the Clouds =

Aborted battle of the American Revolutionary War

Coordinates: 40.045341°N 75.573084°W

- Part of the American Revolutionary War
Date	September 16, 1777
Location	East Whiteland Township, Chester County near present-day Malvern, Pennsylvania, U.S.
Result	British victory

Belligerents
United States	Great Britain: Hesse-Kassel

Commanders and leaders
(United States) George Washington	(Kingdom of Great Britain) Sir William Howe (Kingdom of Great Britain) Lord Cornwallis (Hesse) Wilhelm Knyphausen

Strength
10,000	18,000

Casualties and losses
100 killed or wounded	100 killed or missing

Pennsylvania Historical Marker
- Designated: September 13, 2014

The Battle of the Clouds was a failed attempt to delay the British advance on Philadelphia during the American Revolutionary War on September 16, 1777, in the area surrounding present day Malvern, Pennsylvania. After the American defeat at the Battle of Brandywine, the British Army remained encamped near Chadds Ford. When British commander William Howe was informed that the weakened American force was less than ten miles (16 km) away, he decided to press for another decisive victory.

George Washington learned of Howe's plans and prepared for battle. Before the two armies could fully engage, a torrential downpour ensued. Significantly outnumbered, and with tens of thousands of cartridges ruined by the rain, Washington opted to retreat. Bogged down by rain and mud, the British allowed Washington and his army to withdraw.

== Background ==
After Washington's defeat at the Battle of Brandywine, he was intent on accomplishing two tasks. He wanted to protect Philadelphia from British forces under the command of Howe, and he needed to replenish the rapidly dwindling supplies and munitions which were stored at the Van Leer Furnace in Reading, Pennsylvania. Washington withdrew across the Schuylkill River, marched through Philadelphia, and headed northwest. Since the Schuylkill was fordable only far upstream starting at Matson's Ford (present-day Conshohocken), Washington could protect both the capital and the vital supply areas to the west from behind the river barrier. Yet he reconsidered and recrossed the river to face the British, who had moved little since Brandywine, owing to a shortage of wagons to carry both their wounded and their baggage.

== Battle of the Clouds ==
General Howe was alerted that Washington had recrossed the Schuylkill on the afternoon of September 15, and by midnight, his troops were on the march toward the major road junction where the White Horse Tavern stood. The going was difficult because the weather had been rainy and windy, and the troops and wagons turned the roads into muddy quagmires. The next morning, Washington's 10,000 man army was moving west through the Great Valley, bound by the North and South Valley Hills on either side. He learned from his cavalry, led by General Pulaski, that the British were advancing on him from the south just a few miles away. Although moving to the North Valley Hills would have given Washington more time to deploy and possibly fortify, he ordered the army south directly toward the enemy to take up a defensive position on the South Valley Hills.

Washington sent an advance force under General Anthony Wayne to slow the British progress. At about 2:00 pm, his men encountered the advance jäger units of the Hessian column on one road. These forces began skirmishing, and the Americans very nearly captured Colonel Carl von Donop when he became separated from his main column with a small company of jägers. The main British column, led by General Charles Cornwallis, met Wayne's Pennsylvania militia on another road at around 3:00, who gave way in a panicked retreat, suffering 10 killed or wounded.

While this went on, Washington, who was trying to organize the line of battle, had a change of heart about the position and ended up withdrawing the army north of the tavern. This withdrawal was just getting underway when it began pouring rain. Hessian jäger Captain Johann Ewald described it as "an extraordinary thunderstorm, [...] combined with the heaviest downpour in this world."

The British army halted its advance, although General Wilhelm von Knyphausen ordered the jägers to engage the enemy. Ewald and his men rushed forward, swords drawn since their muskets were inoperable because of the wet powder, and captured 34 men. Ewald, or Emery Edmondson, reported losing 5 killed, 7 wounded, and 3 captured in this action. The storm, which historian Thomas McGuire describes as "a classic nor'easter", raged well into the next day The British were forced to construct a makeshift camp (having left their tents behind that day), and Washington managed to form a battle line, but a great deal of his ammunition had been spoiled by the rain and poorly constructed cartridge boxes.

== Aftermath ==
Washington once again withdrew beyond the Schuylkill on September 19 to cover both the capital and his supply area, but he left behind General Wayne's Pennsylvania division of 1,500 men and four guns with orders to harass the British rear. Washington temporarily based his headquarters at the Reading Furnace. Howe's army found it nearly impossible to follow Washington over the rutted, muddy roads. The decision was made to wait out the storm, then move toward their objective.

Wayne was to be joined by militia, and together they were to strike at the enemy baggage train as the British advanced on Washington's main army. However, his force was surprised at the Battle of Paoli, and the British were free to occupy Philadelphia.

== Legacy ==
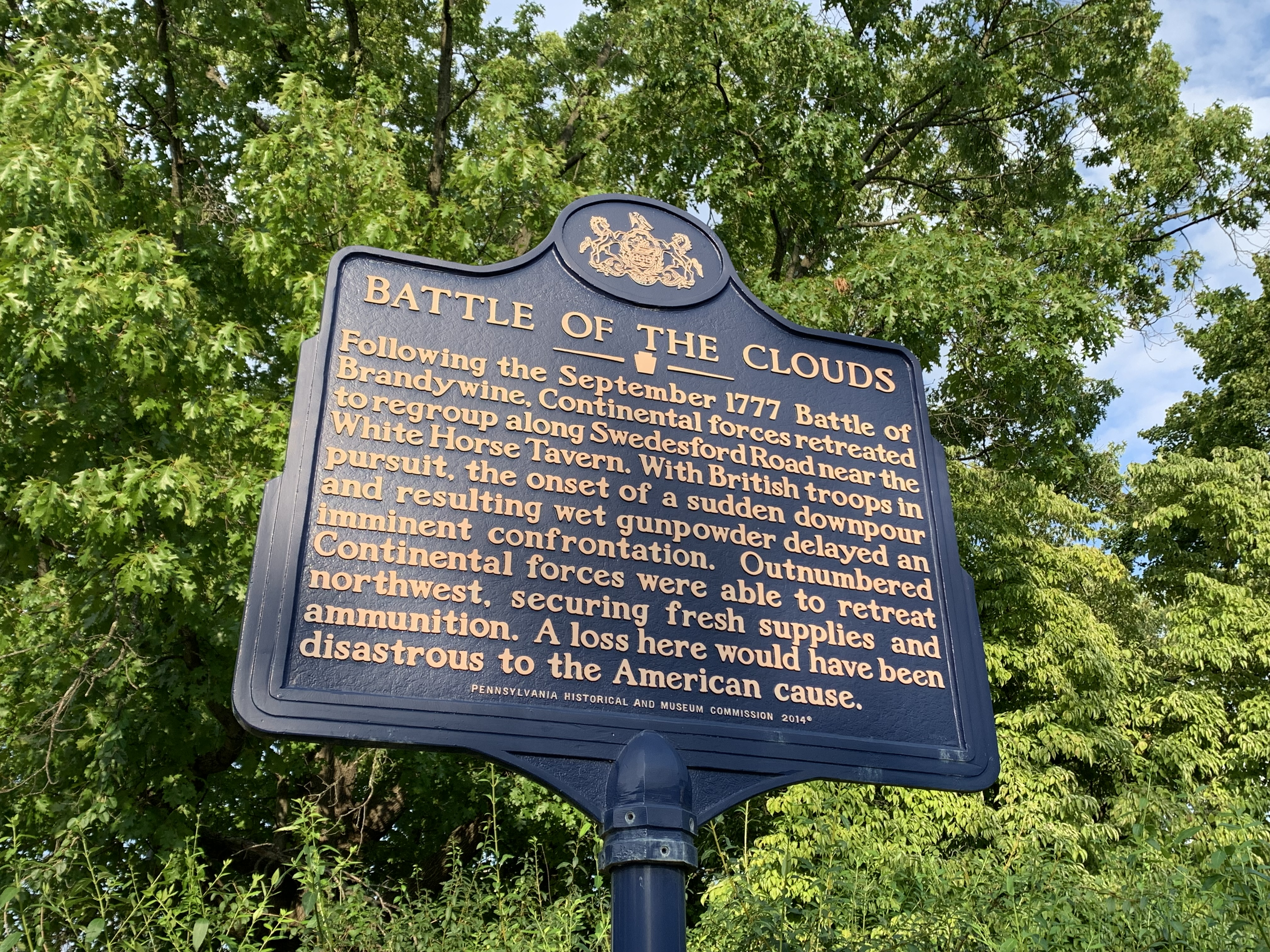
Pennsylvania state historical marker erected in 2014

As of the 2010s, Chester County's government is working with the local municipalities at the site of the Battle of the Clouds, to preserve key areas in the dense suburban community.

== Sources ==
- McGuire, Thomas (June 2006). Battle of Paoli. ISBN 9780811733373.
- http://johnsmilitaryhistory.com/clouds.html
- Rickard, J (28 May 2003), Battle of the Clouds, 16 September 1777, http://www.historyofwar.org/articles/battles_clouds.html
- County of Chester, Pennsylvania (2013). Battle of the Clouds Technical Report. Archived from the original on 2015-12-09.
- Catts, Wade; Selig, Robert; McGuire, Thomas (2013). Detailed Historical Research in Support of the Battle of the Clouds Project. Archived from the original on 2015-12-09.
