= Fort Hill Park =

Public park in Staten Island, New York

- Interactive map of Fort Hill Park
- Location: St. George, Staten Island, New York City
- Coordinates: 40°38′28″N 74°04′54″W
- Area: .845 acres (0.342 ha)
- Opened: August 2, 2004
- Operator: New York City Department of Parks and Recreation

Fort Hill Park (formerly Fort Knyphausen) is a .845-acre (0.342 ha) public green space located in the St. George neighborhood of Staten Island, New York. It is located on the slope of the northernmost hilltop on the Dongan Hills ridge.

During the American Revolutionary War, the borough was a stronghold of the loyalist movement, welcoming General William Howe’s occupying army in August 1776. At the summit of Fort Hill, Prussian general Wilhelm von Knyphausen (1716–1800) founded an earthen redoubt (along with the King's Orange Rangers). In honor of its commander, the structure carried the name Fort Knyphausen for the duration of the Revolutionary War.

In January 1780, Von Knyphausen successfully repelled an American assault against the fort. The fort also served as a base of operations in raids launched against American positions in New Jersey. Following the British evacuation of Staten Island in November 1783, the fort was abandoned, with its square base later used as a reservoir.

The parcel that became Fort Hill Park and the surrounding area was purchased and developed by wealthy German furrier and businessman, Charles A. Herpich, who built a mansion on the area that is now Fort Hill Park. The development of this hillside was made possible by his construction of a windmill and cisterns on his property, which is now the location of Liotti Ikefugi Playground. Many of the surrounding properties, including the Vanderzee-Harper house, were built by Herpich and sold to prominent residents. Herpich died on June 18th of 1898 by suspected suicide after a string of business troubles. Little is known of what happened to the property after his death, but it fell into disrepair and eventually demolished around 1987 after neighbors complained to the city. Parts of the foundation can still be seen today as the embankment between 11 Fort Hill Park and 97 Fort Place.

In 1999 developer Brent Lally planned to build homes on the former property. The nonprofit Trust for Public Land entered into six years of negotiations with Lally, purchasing the site in 2004 and transferring the .84-acre (0.34 ha) parcel to the City. The City purchased the property, and it was dedicated as a park on August 2, 2004. In 2008, the blue indigo granite and bluestone capstone wall was restored, along with a bluestone sidewalk to enhance the historic appearance of the park.

== See also ==
- Wilhelm von Knyphausen
