= Blonde Rock, Nova Scotia =

Blonde Rock is a shoal off the south-eastern tip of Nova Scotia, Canada. It is located at position 43° 20′ 28″ N, 65° 59′ 10″ W, and 5.9 kilometres (3.7 mi) roughly south-southeast of Seal Island. At a low spring tide, only two feet of the rock are above water.

The shoal was named after British Royal Navy frigate HMS Blonde, which was wrecked on the shoal on 21 January 1782. The 60 American prisoners on board HMS Blonde made their way to Seal Island, Nova Scotia. American privateer Noah Stoddard in the Scammell rescued them and controversially allowed the British crew to return to Halifax in HMS Observer, (which was involved in the Naval battle off Halifax en route), leading to his later exile in Nova Scotia as a Loyalist.
