= Philadelphia campaign =

Campaign of the American Revolutionary War

- Part of the Pennsylvanian front of the American Revolutionary War
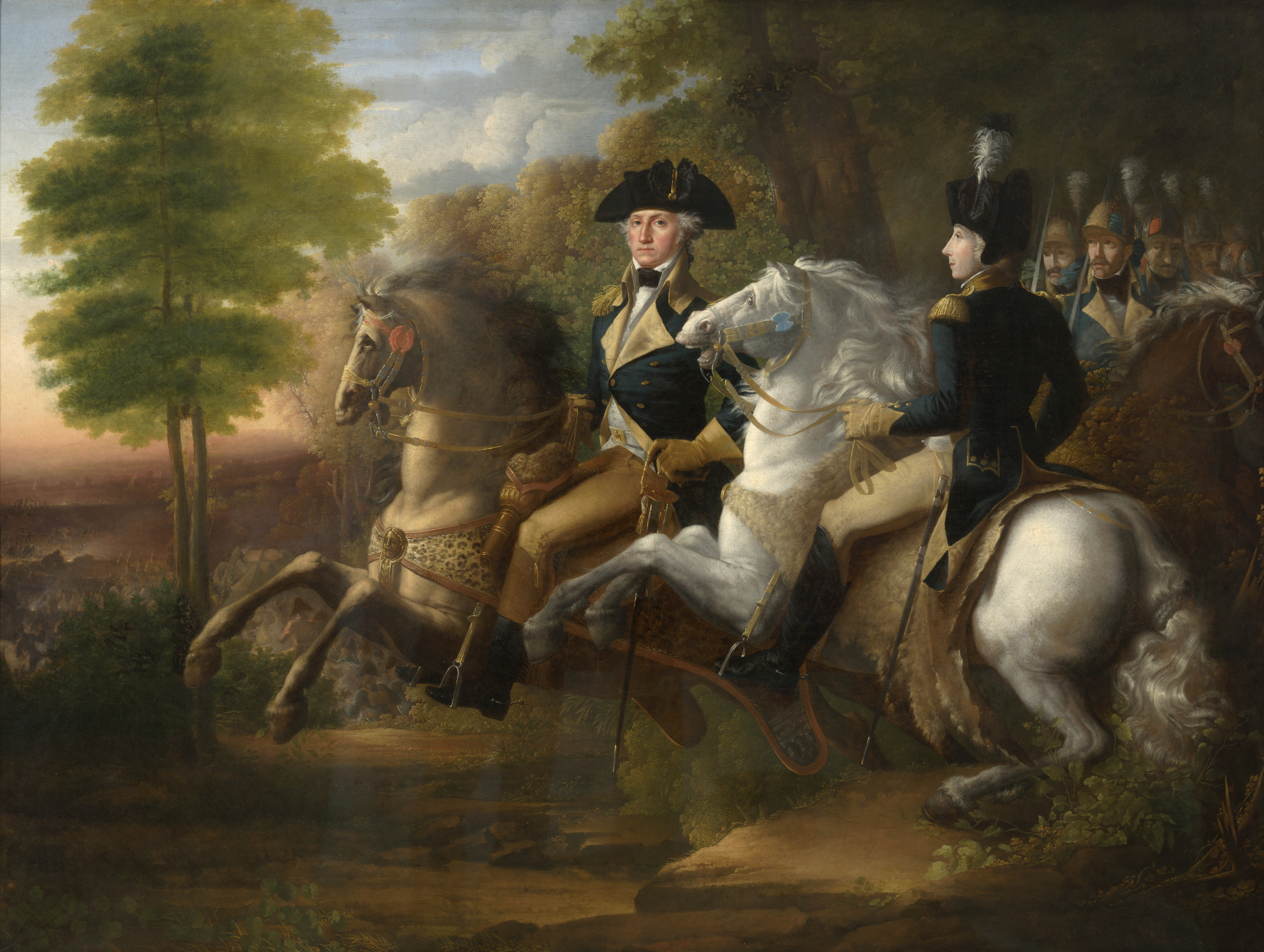
- The Battle of Brandywine, a major battle of the campaign
Date	July 1777–July 1778
Location	New Jersey, Maryland, Delaware, and Pennsylvania
Result	Inconclusive

Belligerents
United States: 2nd Canadian Regiment; Oneida	Great Britain; Hesse-Kassel

Commanders and leaders
(United States) George Washington (United States) Nathanael Greene (United States) Benjamin Lincoln (United States) Lord Stirling (United States) John Sullivan (United States) Anthony Wayne (United States) Marquis de Lafayette (United States) Henry Knox; Moses Hazen	(Kingdom of Great Britain) Sir William Howe (Kingdom of Great Britain) Sir Henry Clinton (Kingdom of Great Britain) Lord Cornwallis (Kingdom of Great Britain) Charles Grey (Hesse) Wilhelm Knyphausen (Hesse) Carl Donop † (Hesse) Ludwig Wurmb

Strength
Around 20,000+	Around 16,000+

The Philadelphia campaign (1777–1778) was a British military campaign during the American Revolutionary War designed to gain control of Philadelphia. Philadelphia was the Revolutionary-era capital where the Second Continental Congress convened, formed the Continental Army, and appointed George Washington as its commander in 1775, and later authored and unanimously adopted the Declaration of Independence the following year, on July 4, 1776, which formalized and escalated the war.

In the Philadelphia campaign, British General William Howe failed to draw the Continental Army under George Washington into a battle in North Jersey. Howe then embarked his army on transports, and landed them at the northern end of the Chesapeake Bay, where they began advancing north toward Philadelphia. Washington prepared defenses against Howe's movements at Brandywine Creek, but was flanked and beaten back in the Battle of Brandywine on September 11, 1777. After further skirmishes and maneuvers, Howe entered and occupied Philadelphia. Washington then unsuccessfully attacked one of Howe's garrisons at Germantown prior to retreating to Valley Forge for the winter, where he and 12,000 faced the harshest winter of the war, including insufficient food and clothing.

Howe's campaign was controversial because, while he succeeded in capturing the revolutionary capital of Philadelphia, he proceeded slowly and did not aid the concurrent campaign of John Burgoyne further north, which ended in disaster for the British in the Battles of Saratoga and brought France into the war. Howe resigned during the occupation of Philadelphia and was replaced by his second-in-command, General Sir Henry Clinton.

In 1778, Clinton was ordered to evacuate Philadelphia and consolidate his troops in New York City, in anticipation of a combined Franco-American attack there. Many Loyalists also left Philadelphia, fearing persecution. Washington's forces shadowed the withdrawing British Army until they clashed at the Battle of Monmouth, one of the war's largest battles.

At the end of the Philadelphia campaign in 1778, the two armies found themselves in roughly the same strategic positions that they had been in before Howe launched the attack on Philadelphia.

== History ==
=== British plan to capture Philadelphia ===
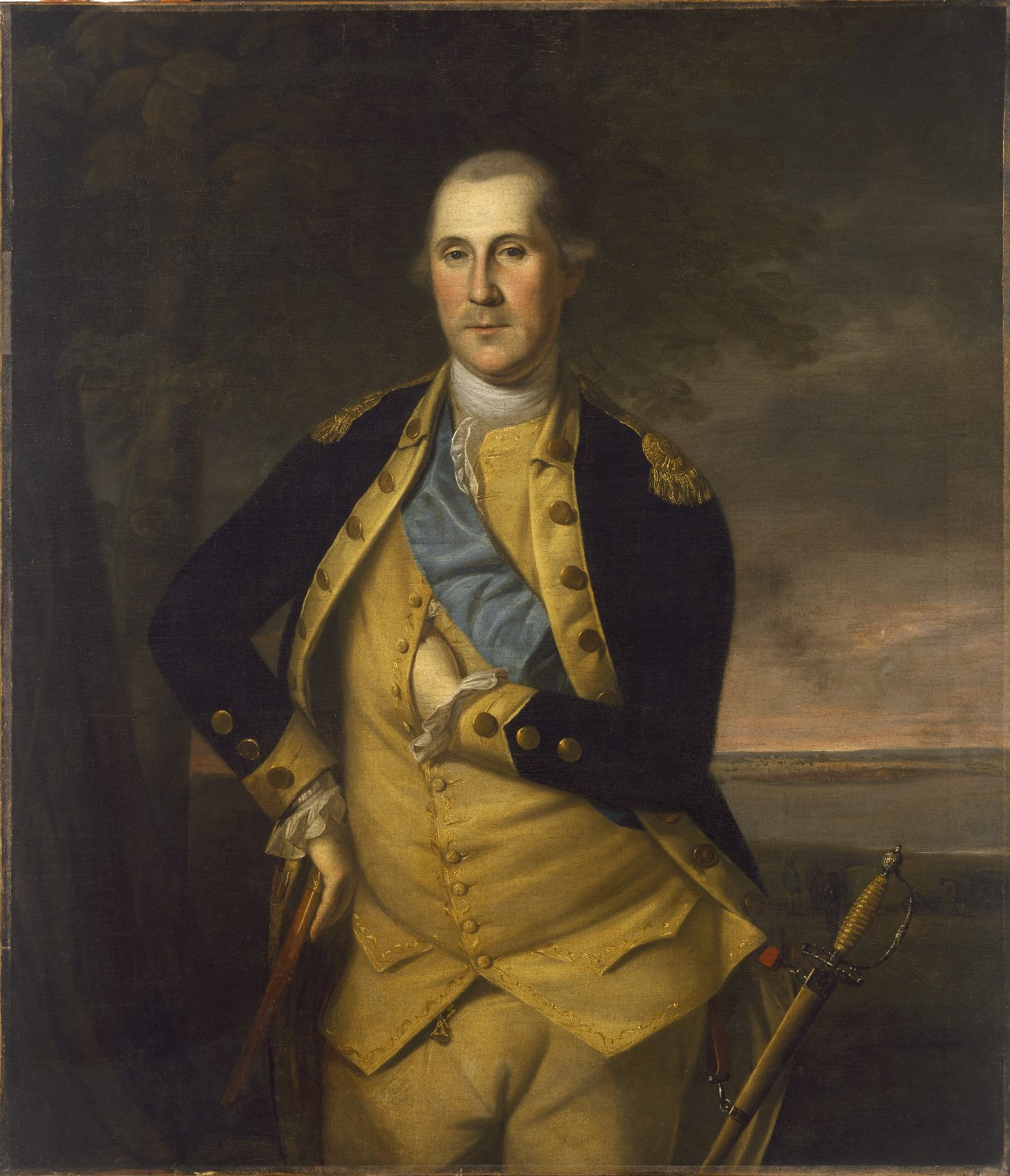
1776 portrait of George Washington, commander of the Continental Army

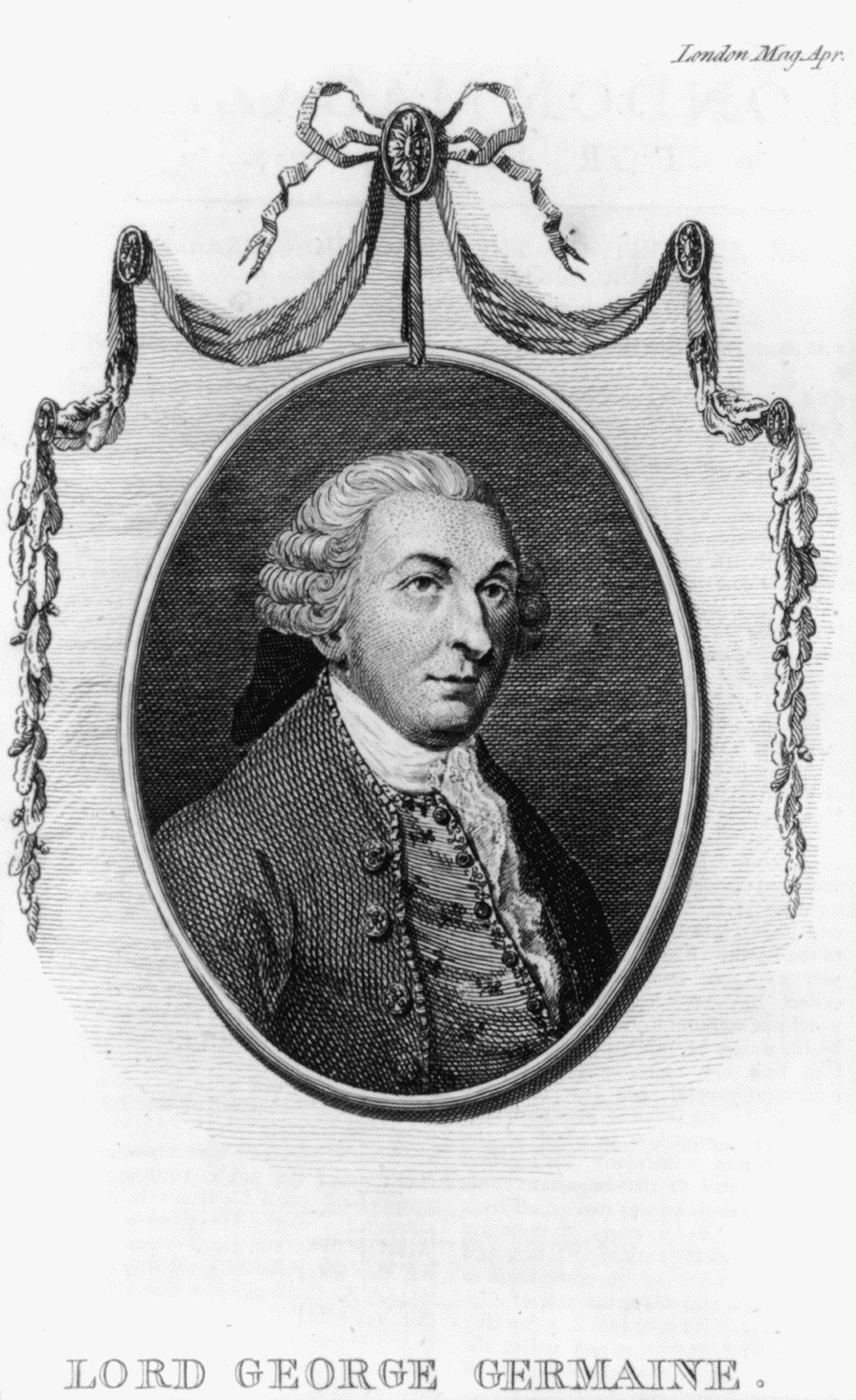
Lord George Germain, the British Secretary of State for the Colonies

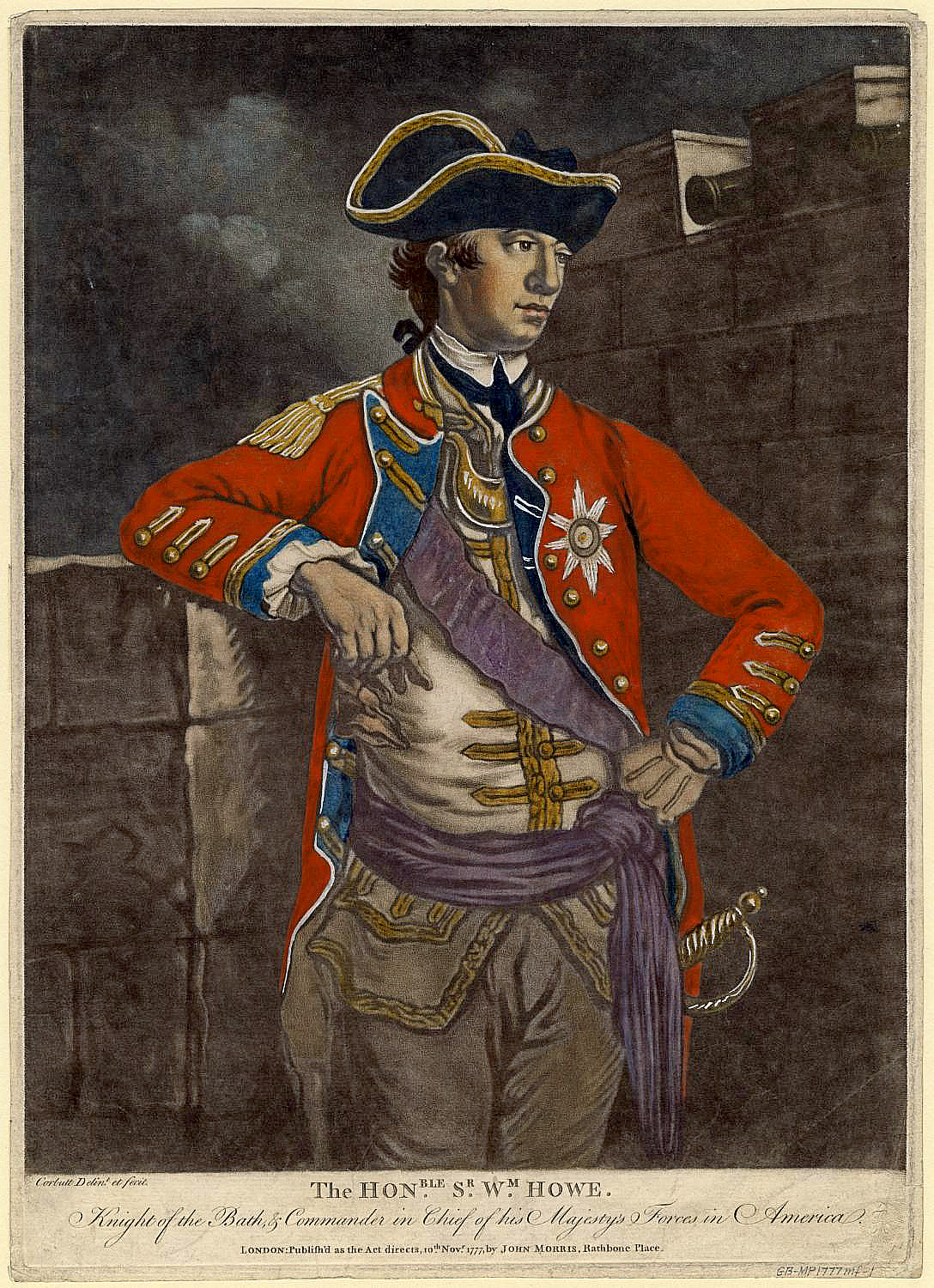
British Army General Sir William Howe

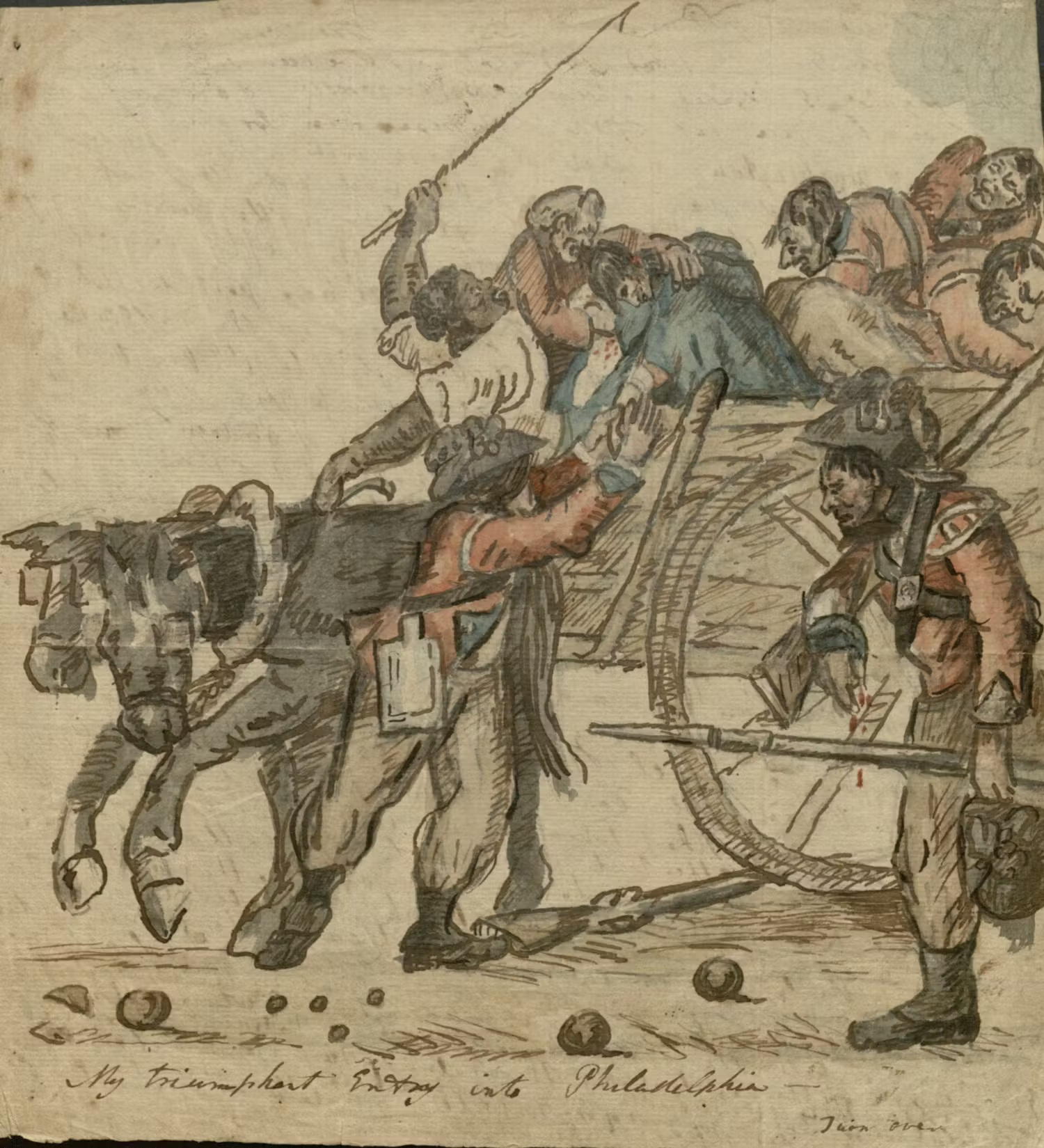
British casualties entering Philadelphia following the Battle of Germantown

Following William Howe's capture of New York City and George Washington's success in the Battles of Trenton and Princeton, the two armies settled into an uneasy stalemate in the winter months of early 1777. While punctuated by numerous skirmishes, the British Army continued to occupy outposts at New Brunswick and Perth Amboy in New Jersey.

In 1777, Howe proposed to George Germain, the British civilian official responsible for war's conduct, that British expedition be launched with the goal of capturing Philadelphia, the seat of the rebellious Second Continental Congress. Germain approved Howe's plan, although with fewer troops than Howe requested. He also approved plans by John Burgoyne for an expedition to "force his way to Albany" from Montreal. Germain's approval of Howe's expedition included the expectation that Howe would be able to assist Burgoyne, effecting a junction at Albany between the forces of Burgoyne and troops that Howe would send north from New York City.

Howe decided in early April 1777 against taking the British Army over land to Philadelphia through New Jersey since this route would entail having to cross of the broad Delaware River under hostile conditions and likely require the transportation or construction of necessary watercraft. Howe's plan, sent to Germain on April 2, isolated Burgoyne from any possibility of significant support, since Howe instead would take the British Army to Philadelphia by sea, and the New York garrison would be too small for any significant offensive operations up the Hudson River to assist Burgoyne.

Washington realized that Howe "certainly ought in good policy to endeavor to Cooperate with Genl. Burgoyne" and was baffled why he did not do so. Washington at the time and historians ever since have wondered why Howe was not in place to come to the relief of Burgoyne, whose invasion army from Canada was surrounded and captured by the Americans in October. Historians agree that Lord Germain did a poor job in coordinating the two campaigns. Following Howe's capture of New York City and Washington's retreat across the Delaware River, Howe wrote to Germain on December 20, 1776, proposing an elaborate set of campaigns for 1777. These included operations to gain control of the Hudson River, expand operations from the base at Newport, Rhode Island, and take Philadelphia, the seat of the rebel Continental Congress. The latter Howe saw as attractive, since Washington was then just north of the city: Howe wrote that he was "persuaded the Principal Army should act offensively [against Philadelphia], where the enemy's chief strength lies." Germain acknowledged that this plan was particularly "well digested", but it called for more men than Germain was prepared to provide. After the setbacks in New Jersey, Howe in mid-January 1777 proposed operations against Philadelphia that included an overland expedition and a sea-based attack, thinking this might lead to a decisive victory over the Continental Army. This plan was developed to the extent that in April Howe's army was seen constructing pontoon bridges; Washington, lodged in his winter quarters at Morristown, New Jersey, thought they were for eventual use on the Delaware River. However, by mid-May Howe had apparently abandoned the idea of an overland expedition: "I propose to invade Pennsylvania by sea ... we must probably abandon the Jersies."

Howe's decision to not assist Burgoyne may have been rooted in his perception that Burgoyne would receive credit for a successful campaign, even if it required Howe's help. This would not help Howe's reputation as much as if the Philadelphia campaign succeeded. Historian John Alden notes the jealousies among various British leaders, saying, "It is likely that [Howe] was as jealous of Burgoyne as Burgoyne was of him and that he was not eager to do anything which might assist his junior up the ladder of military renown." Along the same lines Don Higginbotham concludes that in Howe's view, "[The Hudson River campaign] was Burgoyne's whole show, and consequently he [Howe] wanted little to do with it. With regard to Burgoyne's army, he would do only what was required of him (virtually nothing)." Howe himself wrote to Burgoyne on July 17: "My intention is for Pennsylvania, where I expect to meet Washington, but if he goes to the northward contrary to my expectations, and you can keep him at bay, be assured I shall soon be after him to relieve you." He sailed from New York not long after.

Washington's Continental Army had been encamped primarily at Morristown, New Jersey, although there was a forward base at Bound Brook, only a few miles from the nearest British outposts. In part as a retaliatory measure against the ongoing skirmishes, General Charles Cornwallis executed a raid against that position in April 1777, in which he very nearly captured the outpost's commander, Benjamin Lincoln. In response to this raid, Washington moved his army forward to a strongly fortified position at Middlebrook in the Watchung Mountains that commanded likely British land routes toward Philadelphia.

For reasons that are not entirely clear, Howe moved a sizable army to Somerset Court House, south of New Brunswick, New Jersey. He performed this move as a feint to draw Washington out from his strong position, but it failed since Washington refused to move his army out in force. Washington had intelligence that Howe had not brought watercraft or the necessary equipment for constructing them, so this move seemed unlikely to him to be a move toward the Delaware River. When Howe eventually withdrew his army back toward Perth Amboy, Washington did follow. Launching a lightning strike, Howe sent forces under Cornwallis in an attempt to cut Washington off from the high ground; this attempt was foiled in the Battle of Short Hills. Howe then withdrew his troops to Perth Amboy, embarked them on transports, and sailed out of New York harbor, destined for Philadelphia.

Washington did not know where Howe was going. Considering the possibility that Howe was again feinting, and would actually sail his army up the Hudson to join with Burgoyne, he remained near New York. Only when he received word that Howe's fleet had reached the mouth of the Delaware, did he need to consider the defense of Philadelphia. However, the fleet did not enter the Delaware, instead continuing south. Uncertain of Howe's goal, which could be Charleston, South Carolina, he considered moving north to assist in the defense of the Hudson, when he learned that the fleet had entered the Chesapeake Bay. In August, he began moving his troops south to prepare the city's defenses. General John Sullivan, who commanded the Continental Army's troops facing Staten Island, had, in order to capitalize on perceived weaknesses of the British position there following Howe's departure, attempted a raid on August 22, that failed with the Battle of Staten Island.

=== Capture of Philadelphia ===
In late August, British Army General Howe landed 15,000 troops at the northern end of the Chesapeake Bay, about 55 miles (90 km) southwest of Philadelphia. Continental Army General Washington positioned 11,000 men between Howe and Philadelphia but was outflanked and driven back at the Battle of Brandywine on September 11, 1777. The Continental Army suffered over 1,000 casualties, and the British lost about half that number.

The Continental Congress was once again forced to abandon Philadelphia, relocating first to Lancaster, Pennsylvania, and later York, Pennsylvania. British and Revolutionary forces maneuvered around each other west of Philadelphia for the next several days, clashing in minor encounters such as the abortive Battle of the Clouds and the so-called "Paoli Massacre". On September 26, Howe finally outmaneuvered Washington and marched into Philadelphia unopposed. Capture of the rebel capital did not bring the end to the rebellion as the British thought it would. In 18th-century warfare, it was normal that the side who captured the opposing force's capital city won the war, but the Revolutionary War would continue for six more years until 1783 because of the rebels' unconventional warfare tactics.

After capturing Philadelphia, the British garrisoned about 9,000 troops in Germantown, five miles (8 km) north of Philadelphia. On October 2, the British captured Fort Billingsport, on the Delaware River in New Jersey, to clear a line of chevaux de frise obstacles in the river. The idea of placing those obstacles is attributed to Benjamin Franklin, and they were designed by Robert Smith. An undefended line had already been taken at Marcus Hook, and a third line was nearer Philadelphia, guarded by Fort Mifflin and Fort Mercer. Washington unsuccessfully attacked Germantown on October 4, and then retreated to watch and wait for the British to counterattack. Meanwhile, the British needed to open a supply route along the Delaware River to support their occupation of Philadelphia. After a prolonged defense of the river by Commodore John Hazelwood and the Continental and Pennsylvania Navies, the British finally secured the river by taking forts Mifflin and Mercer in mid-November, although Mercer was not taken until after a humiliating repulse. In early December, Washington successfully repelled a series of probes by General Howe in the Battle of White Marsh.

Washington's problems at this time were not just with the British. In the Conway Cabal, some politicians and officers were unhappy with Washington's performance in the campaign and began secretively discussing Washington's removal. Offended by the behind-the-scenes maneuvering, Washington laid the whole matter openly before Continental Congress. In response, his supporters rallied behind him, and Washington's leadership was reassured.

== Valley Forge and Battle of Monmouth ==
A 1777 British operational map of Philadelphia, including detail of Fort Mifflin, showing the several works constructed by British troops, since its possession on 26 September 1777 and capture of Fort Mifflin on Mud Island on 16 November 1777

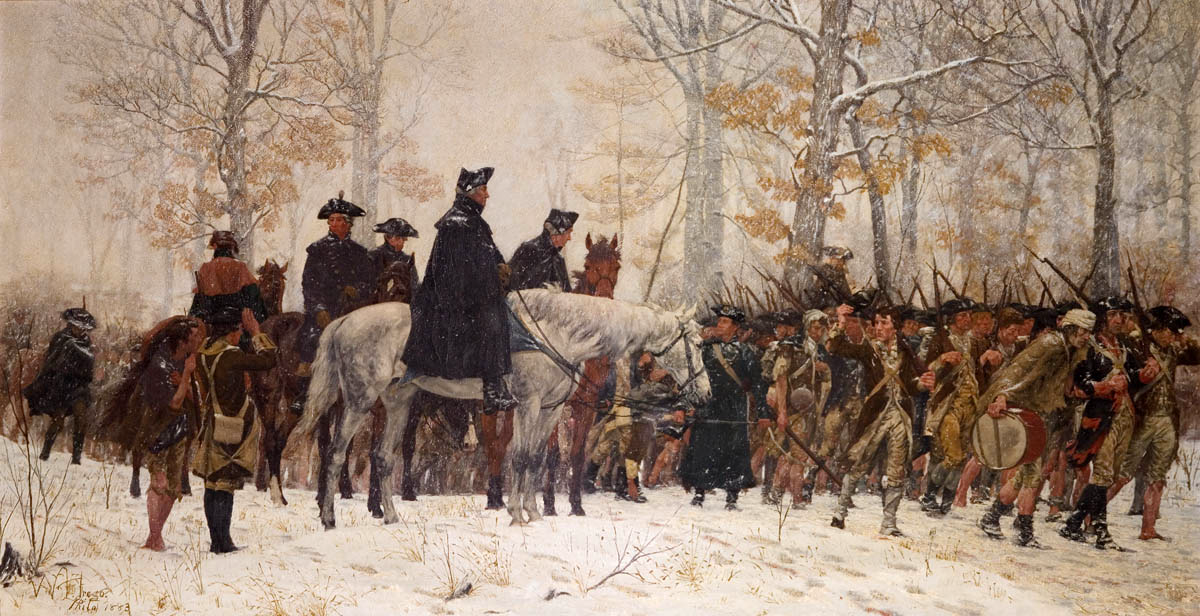
The March to Valley Forge, an 1883 portrait by William B. T. Trego

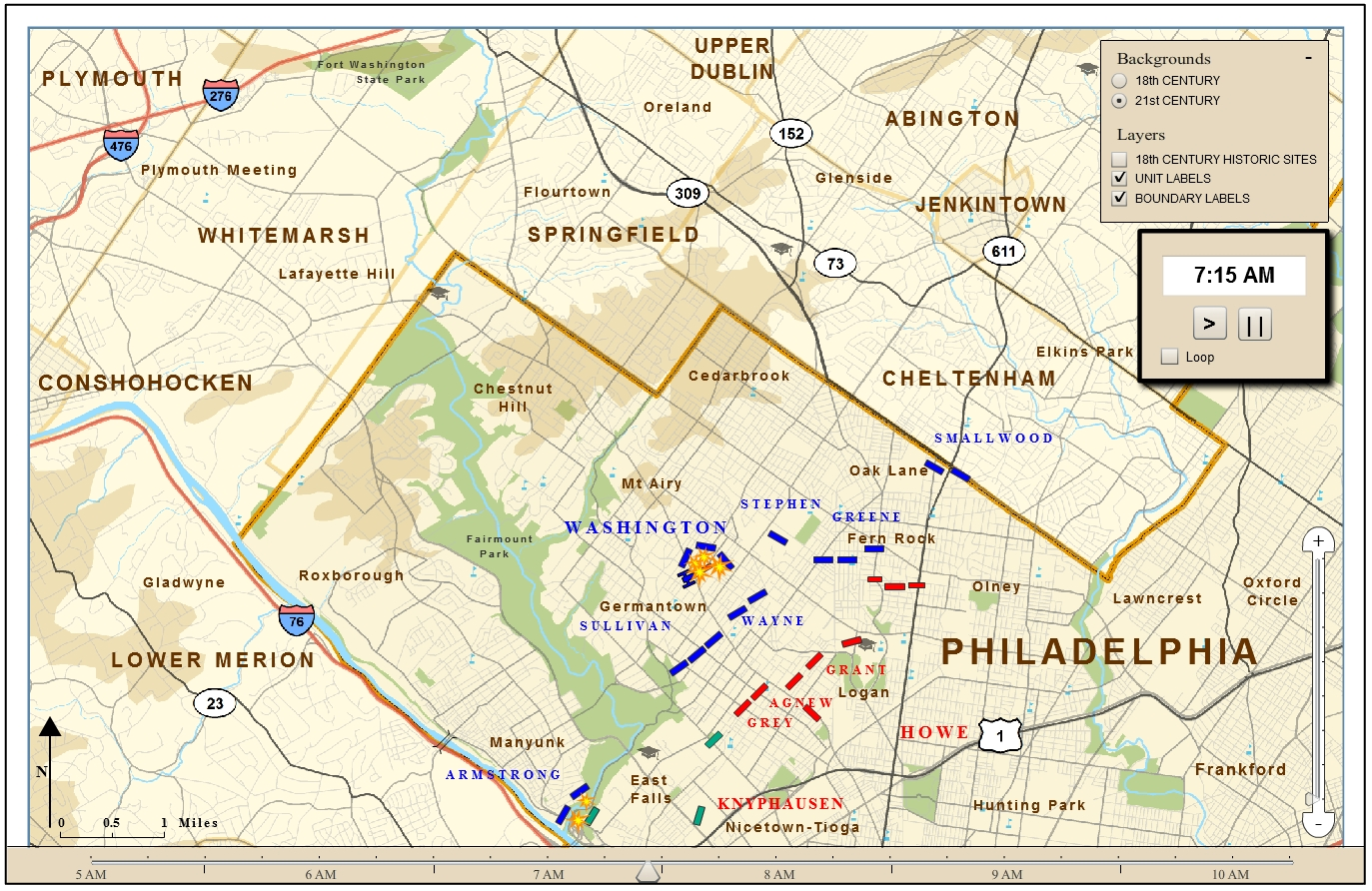
Battle of Germantown snapshot

Washington and his army encamped at Valley Forge in December 1777, about 20 miles (32 km) from Philadelphia, where they stayed for the next six months. Over the winter, 2,500 men (out of 10,000) died from disease and exposure. However, the army eventually emerged from Valley Forge in good order, thanks in part to a training program supervised by Baron von Steuben.

Meanwhile, there was a shakeup in the British command. General Howe resigned his command, and was replaced by Lieutenant General Sir Henry Clinton as commander-in-chief. France's entry into the war forced a change in British war strategy, and Clinton was ordered by the government to abandon Philadelphia and defend New York City, now vulnerable to French naval power. As the British were preparing their withdrawal, Washington sent out Lafayette on a reconnaissance mission. Lafayette narrowly escaped a British ambush at the Battle of Barren Hill. The British sent out a peace commission headed by the Earl of Carlisle, whose offers, which were made in June 1778 as Clinton was preparing to abandon Philadelphia, were rejected by the Second Continental Congress.

Clinton shipped many Loyalists and most of his heavy equipment by sea to New York, and evacuated Philadelphia on June 18, after 266 days of British occupation. Washington's army shadowed Clinton's, and Washington successfully forced a battle at Monmouth Courthouse on June 28, the last major battle in the North. Washington's second-in-command, General Charles Lee, who led the advance force of the army, ordered a controversial retreat early in the battle, allowing Clinton's army to regroup. By July, Clinton was in New York City, and Washington was again at White Plains, New York. Both armies were back where they had been two years earlier.

== Aftermath ==
Shortly after the British arrived in New York City, a French fleet arrived outside its harbor, leading to a flurry of action by both sides. The French and Americans decided to make an attempt on the British garrison at Newport, Rhode Island; this first attempt at coordination was a notable failure.

Under orders from London, Clinton reallocated some of his troops to the West Indies, and began a program of coastal raiding from Chesapeake Bay to Massachusetts. In and around New York City, Clinton and Washington's respective armies watched each other and skirmished, including in two major battles, the 1779 Battle of Stony Point and the 1780 Battle of Connecticut Farms. Clinton considered again attacking the colonial capital of Philadelphia, but these attacks never came to fruition.

The British also began a wider frontier war organized from Quebec City, using Loyalist and Native American allies. British and French forces engaged each other in the West Indies and in India beginning in 1778, and the 1779 entry of Spain into the war widened the global aspects of the war even further.

In 1780, the British began a "southern strategy" to regain control of the rebelling colonies, with the capture of Charleston, South Carolina. This effort would ultimately fail at Yorktown.

During the Philadelphia Campaign the British had several maps drafted of the Delaware River, Forts Mifflin and Mercer and the greater Philadelphia area.

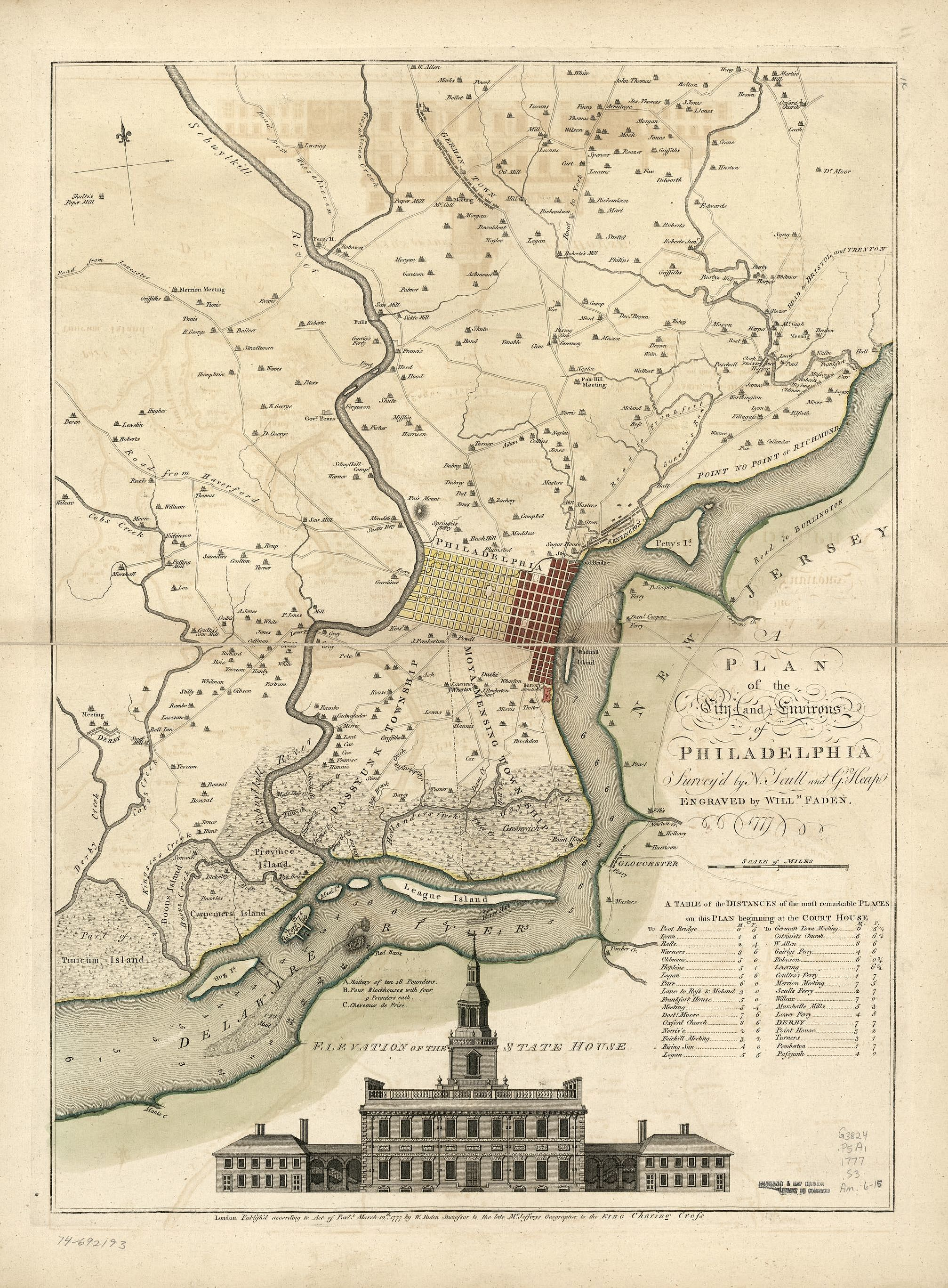

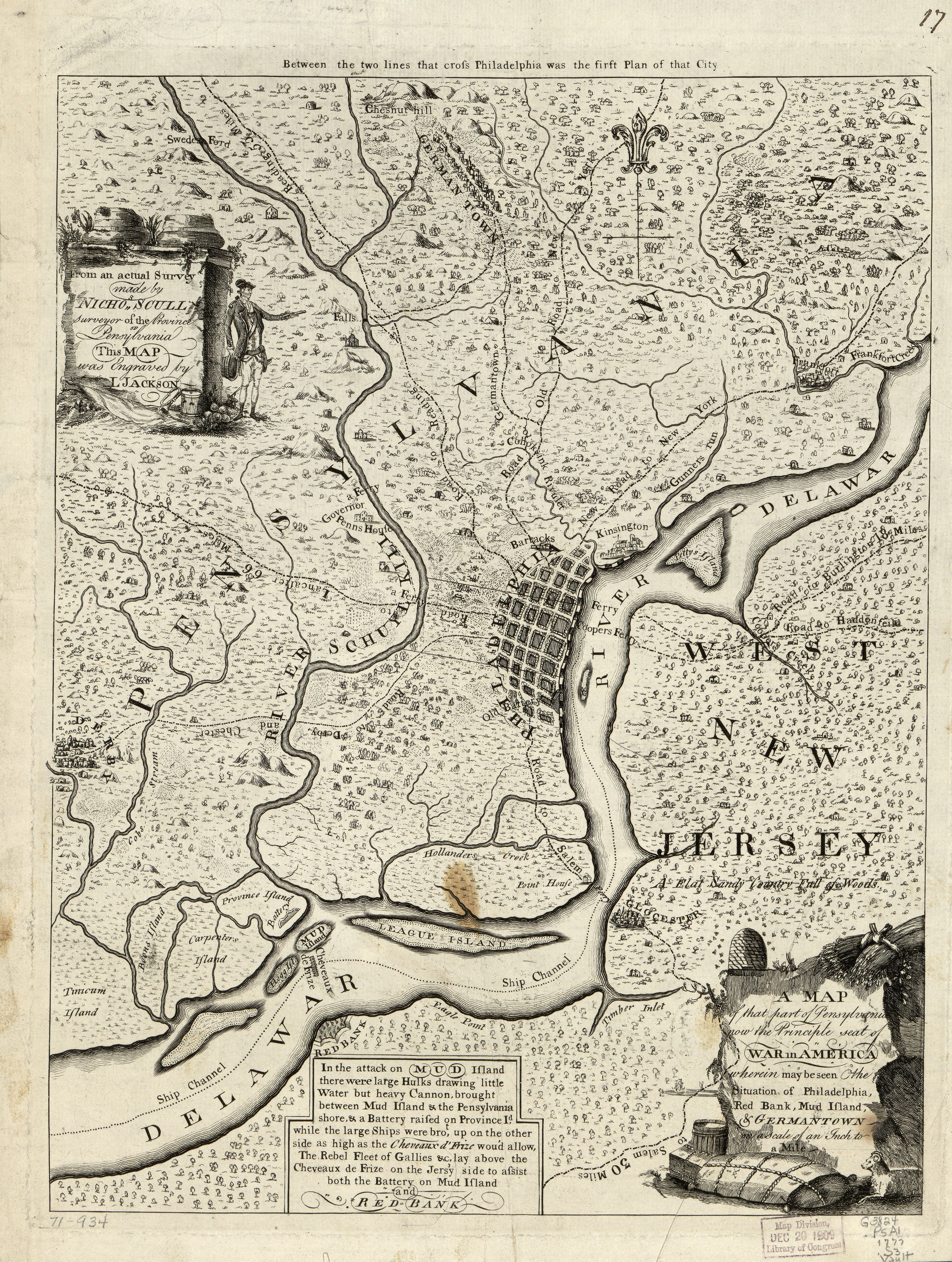

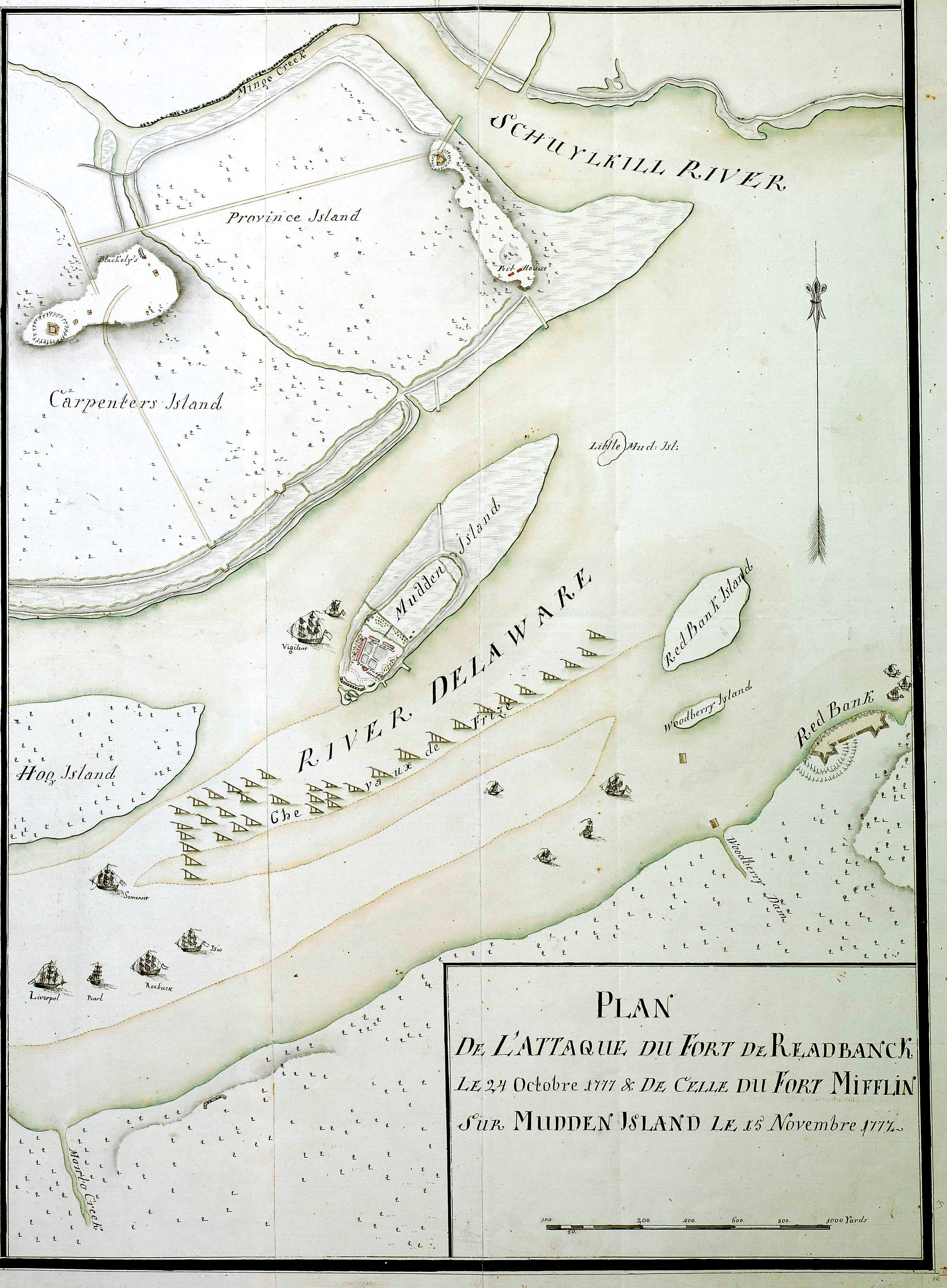

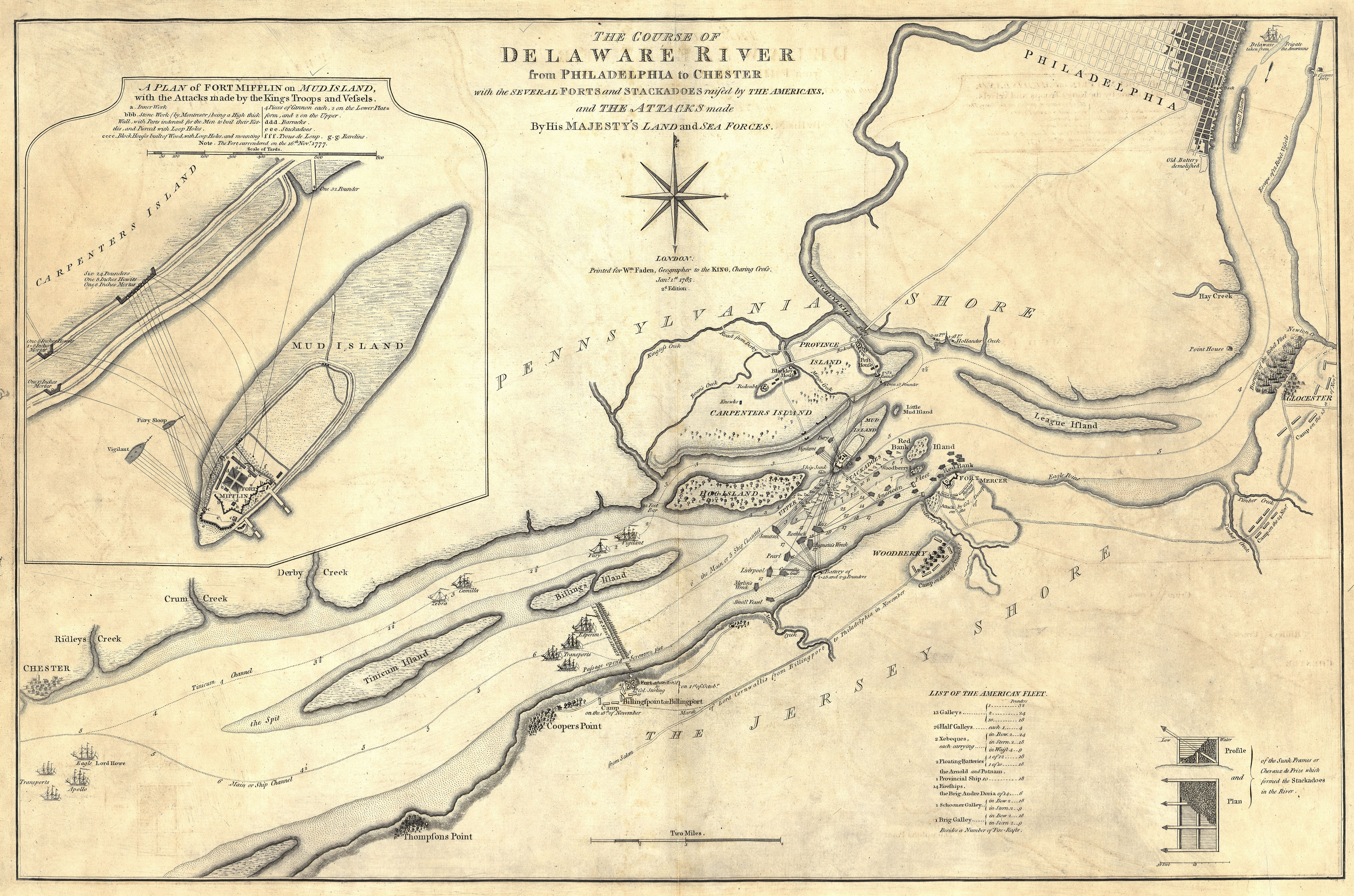

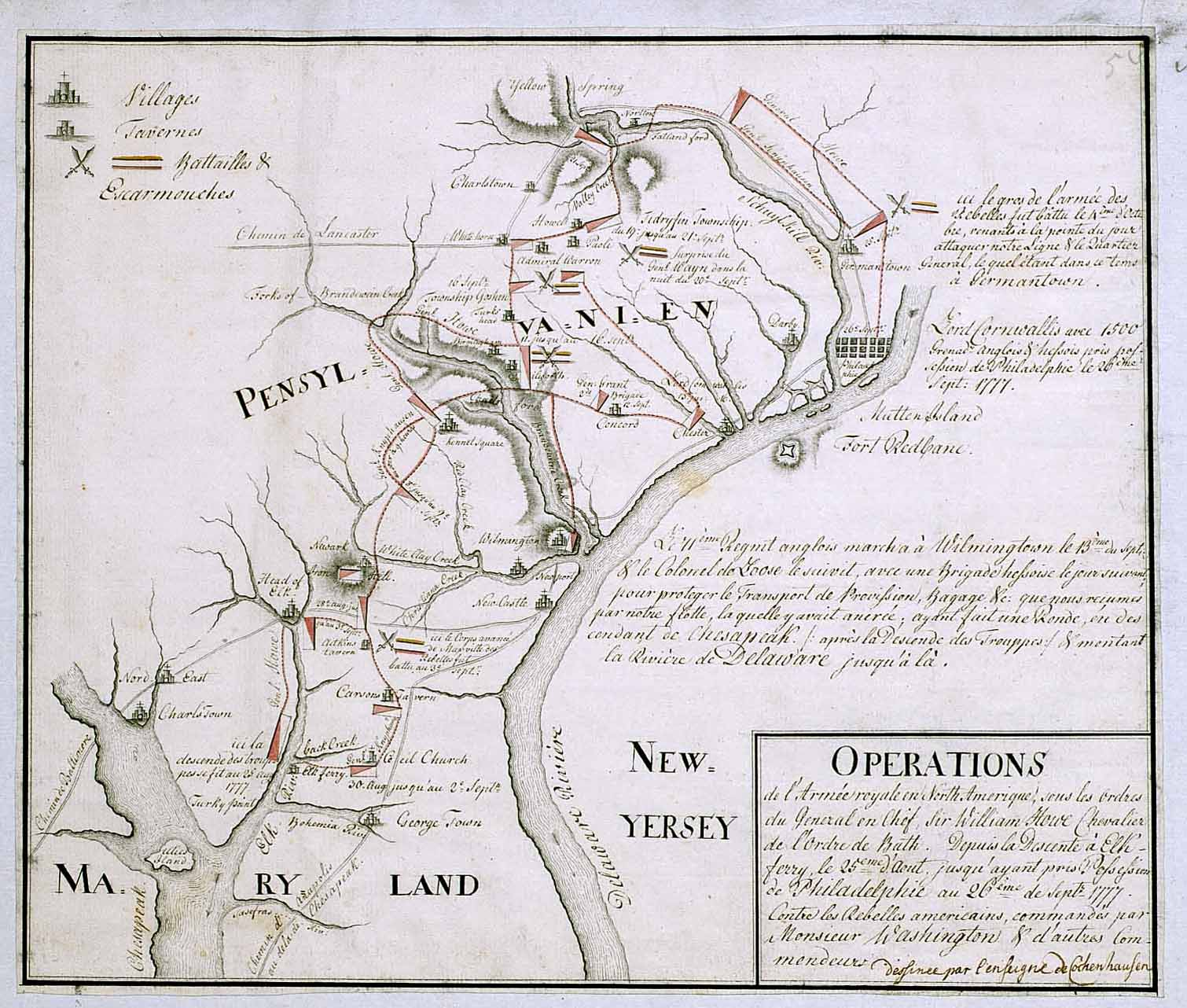

== See also ==
- American Revolutionary War § British northern strategy fails, a description of the Philadelphia campaign's significance in the American Revolutionary War
- List of American Revolutionary War battles
