= William Bayard =

Canadian physician

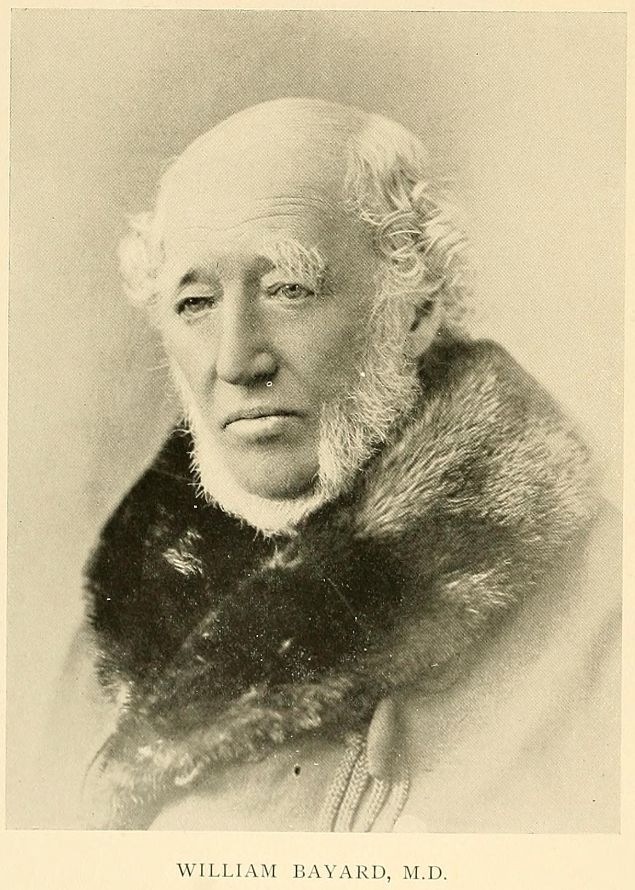

William Bayard (21 August 1814 – 17 December 1907) was a physician in New Brunswick. He was the son of Dr. Robert Bayard, also a noted physician and author.

Bayard was born in Kentville, Nova Scotia, and received his medical training in New York State and at the University of Edinburgh. He received his MD in 1837. He then practiced medicine with his father, Robert Bayard, in Saint John, New Brunswick and continued the practice after his father's death. He was the coroner of that city for 30 years.
