= Fort Morris (Nova Scotia) =

18th-century British fortification

Coordinates: 44.043°N 64.707°W

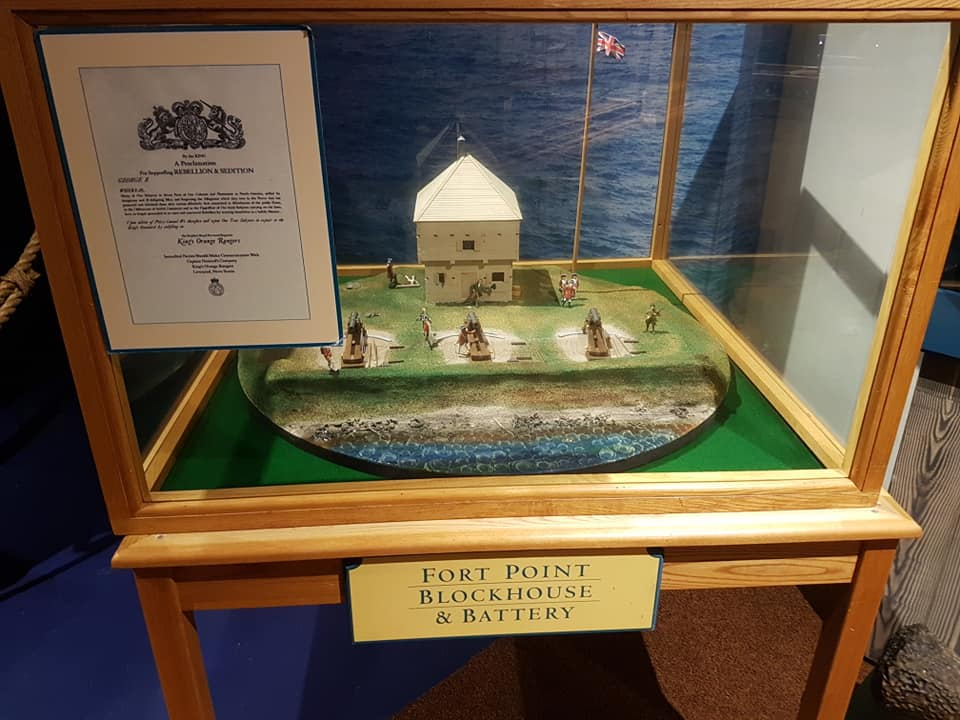
A model of Fort Morris in the Fort Point Lighthouse

Fort Morris was an 18th-century British blockhouse located in Liverpool, Nova Scotia. The fort saw combat during the American Revolution. The fort was demolished and in 1855 a lighthouse was built on its former site; the lighthouse was decommissioned in 1989 and has been preserved.

== History ==
During the American Revolution, Liverpool was frequently raided by American privateers. Lieutenant Colonel Simeon Perkins requested that troops be sent from Halifax; he was denied multiple times before a detachment of 57 King's Orange Rangers was sent on the ship Hannah. On 9 February 1779, six of the seven Rangers guarding Fort Morris stole a boat and deserted, travelling to Port Mouton. American privateers from the schooners Surprize and Delight (itself stolen from Liverpool) captured the fort and most of its garrison in the early morning of 13 September 1780. Perkins organized a capture of the captain of the Surprize and negotiated for the return of the fort and prisoners without bloodshed.

== See also ==
- Military history of Nova Scotia
