= HMS Senegal =

Two vessels that served the Royal Navy have been named Senegal:

- HMS Senegal was launched at Rotherhithe on 26 December 1760 as a 14-gun sloop of 292 tons (bm). She grounded while attempting to enter the harbour at Canso, Nova Scotia, on 22 August 1764 and foundered while being towed into the harbour. It was later commanded by Sir Thomas Rich in 1769 and by William Duddingston in 1771.
- HMS Senegal was a sloop of 183 tons (formerly named Racehorse) that the Royal Navy purchased in 1777 and armed with 16 guns. The French captured her on 15 August 1778. HMS Zephyr recaptured her on 2 November 1780 off the Gambia River, but she blew up by accident at Gorée on 22 November.
