= Seal Island (Nova Scotia) =

Island in Nova Scotia, Canada

- Location within Nova Scotia

Geography
- Location: Nova Scotia, Canada
- Coordinates: 43°24′56.1″N 66°0′37.4″W
- Length: 4.3 km (2.67 mi)
- Width: 0.8 km (0.5 mi)

Administration
- Canada
- Province: Nova Scotia

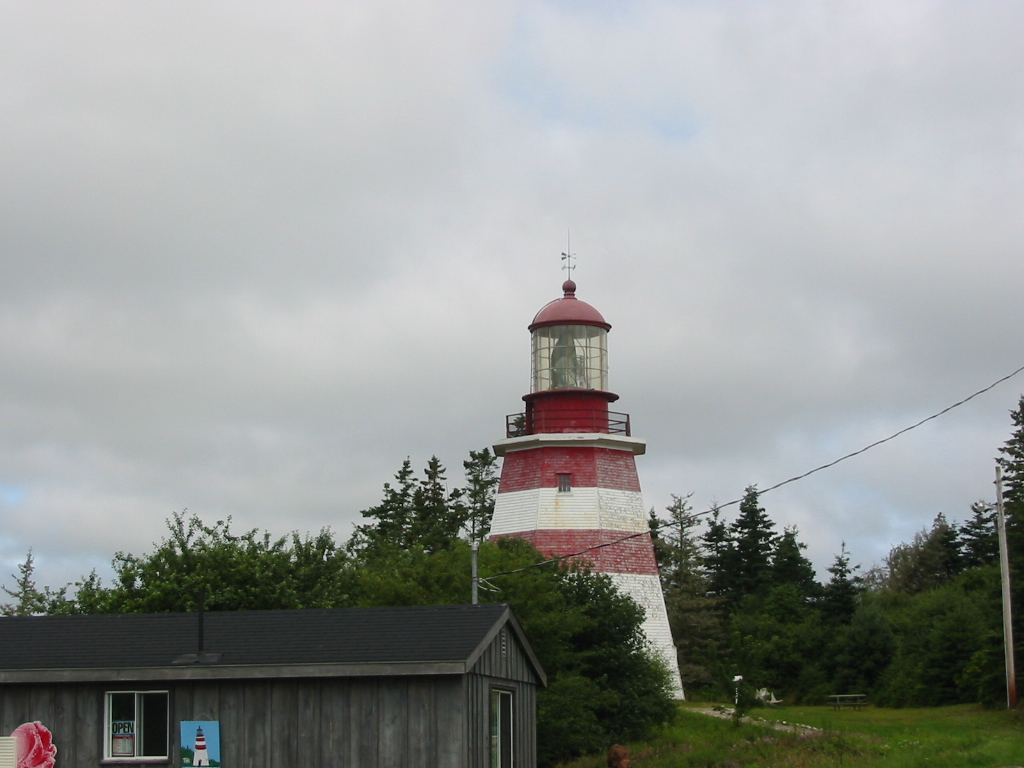
A replica of the Seal Island lighthouse

Seal Island (also known as Great Seal Island) is an island on the outermost extreme of Southwestern Nova Scotia, Canada. It is in the Municipality of the District of Argyle in the Yarmouth County. It is approximately 4.3 kilometres (2.7 mi) long and 0.8 kilometres (0.50 mi) wide and is surrounded on its east, south and west sides by dangerous shoals. It is surrounded by the Atlantic Ocean and is the biggest of a group of five islands which extend north for 12 kilometres (7.5 mi). It is the second southernmost point of land of Nova Scotia. The southern tip of nearby Cape Sable Island is 250 metres (820 ft) farther south than the southern tip of land on Seal Island.

== History ==
During the American Revolution, Noah Stoddard's vessel the Scammell was commissioned in April 1782. Soon after, he rescued the 60 American prisoners on board H.M.S. Blonde, who were stranded on Seal Island after hitting Blonde Rock, Nova Scotia. Stoddard allowed the British crew to return to Halifax.

The island was settled in 1823 by two families from the Barrington area, the Hichens and the Crowells. They used the island as a fishing base and provided shelter to survivors of the many ships wrecked at the island and on nearby reefs. A campaign led by Mary Hichens resulted in the construction of a lighthouse in 1831 which still stands, one of the oldest wooden lighthouses in Canada. Seal Island lightkeepers continued to rescue many shipwreck victims, most notably in 1843 when they saved all the crew and passengers of RMS Columbia, one of Samuel Cunard's first ocean liners.

The Seal Island settlement eventually contained two small villages, The East Side and The West Side. The East Side has historically been inhabited by descendants of the original settling families who owned the island, and the West Side by local fishermen. Today there is a fishermen's Reserve protecting access to this historic fishing ground. The communities shared a post office, church and a lobster cannery (this ceased operations in the 1950s). Year round habitation ceased in 1990 but both villages host summer residents, most of whom have families who once lived on the island.

The barque Loch Sloy was wrecked at Devil's Limb near Seal Island on her maiden voyage.

The island became known for birding in the early 1900s. Groups of birders would visit seasonally, and eventually they wanted a permanent base on the island. An old cookhouse, referred to as North Home, standing in the woods near the West Side, was purchased by a group of birders in the 1960s. The property has been restored in recent years, primarily by two descendants of the original birding families. The East Side has lost its wharf, but retains the Seal Island Church of All Faiths and the East Side village.

Walter W. Hitchens was a Maine State Senator who published a book about Seal Island in 1982, Titled "Island Trek", published by Lancelot Press of Hantsport, Nova Scotia, the book is "an historical and geographical tour of Seal Island...as seen by the author and related to him by Mrs. Winnifred Crowell Hamilton who lived on the Island all her lifetime".

== Seal Island Lighthouse ==
The Seal Island Lighthouse is located on the island, and is the oldest wooden lighthouse in Nova Scotia and one of the oldest in Canada. The lighthouse was de-staffed in 1990. Lack of maintenance and poor ventilation of the lighthouse by the Canadian Coast Guard have raised fears about the condition of the historic structure.

A replica of the Seal Island Lighthouse can be seen in Barrington, Nova Scotia.

== See also ==
- List of lighthouses in Canada
