= King's Orange Rangers =

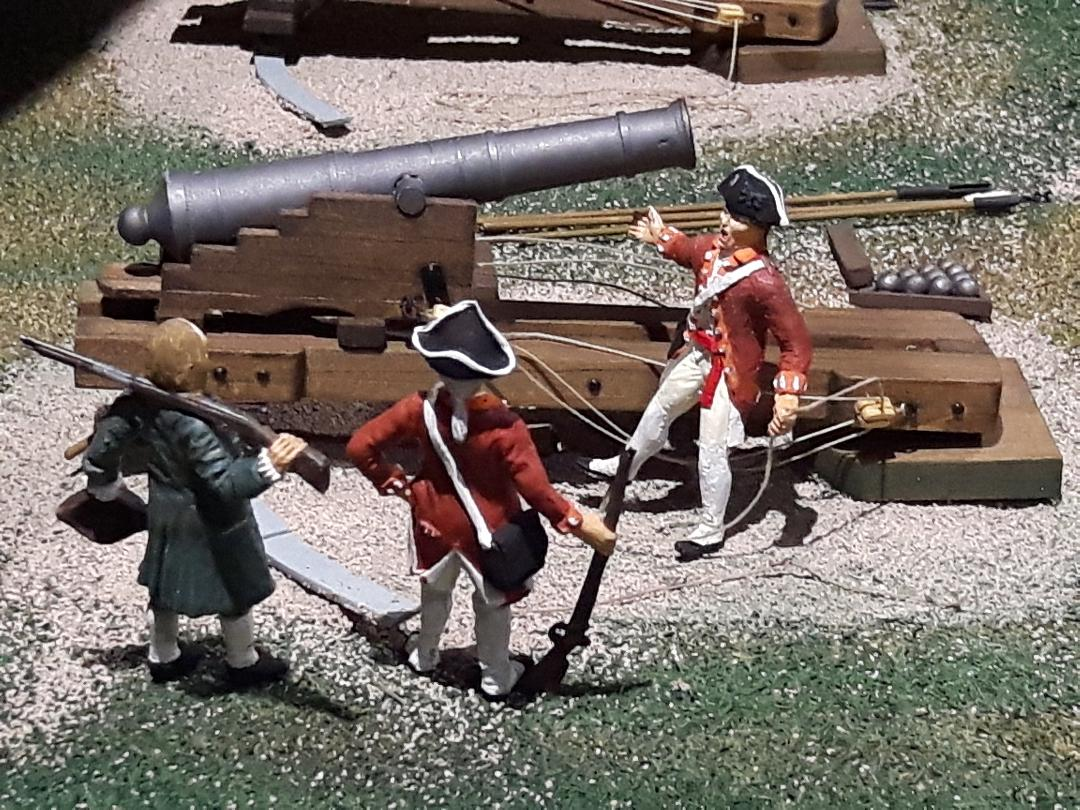
- Kings Orange Rangers, Fort Morris, Liverpool, Nova Scotia
- Active: 1776–1783
- Country: Great Britain
- Allegiance: King George III
- Branch: British provincial rangers, American command
- Type: Auxiliaries; Dragoons; Light infantry
- Role: Conventional warfare Maneuver warfare Raiding; Skirmisher
- Size: 10 companies (600) (battalion)
- Garrison/HQ: King's Bridge, Harlem, Fort Knyphausen, Province of New York 1776-78; Halifax, Liverpool, Province of Nova Scotia 1778-83
- Engagements: American Revolutionary War: Raid on Liverpool (1780)

Commanders
- Notable commanders: General Sir William Howe Brigadier General Henry Edward Fox; Lieutenant Colonel John Bayard; Lieutenant William Bird; Major Samuel Bayard; Captain John Coffin; Captain John Howard Captain Robert Rotton

The King's Orange Rangers, also known as the Corps of King's Orange Rangers, were a British Loyalist battalion, raised in 1776 to defend British interests in Orange County, Province of New York and generally in and around the New York colony, although they saw most of their service in the Province of Nova Scotia. The battalion's commander was Lieutenant Colonel John Bayard. The Rangers had an undistinguished military record, through most of its existence, and saw very limited combat, mostly against Patriot privateers, but did play an important role in the defence of the colony of Nova Scotia in the later years of the American Revolution. The King's Orange Rangers are especially remembered for their role in the defence of Liverpool, in the Nova Scotia colony.

== Battalion formed ==
In 1776 Sir William Howe accepted an offer from William Bayard of New York to raise a battalion to be called the King's Orange Rangers. Rangers were a type of light infantry that had served the British Army during the French and Indian War, although in the event the KOR served as garrison troops for the duration. Bayard, who owned estates in both New York and New Jersey, named one of his sons, John to be colonel and another, Samuel, to be a captain. Within four months about 200 men had been recruited, and the KOR was put on duty at King's Bridge, at the northern tip of Manhattan Island; however, during the winter the unit suffered much from smallpox "and other disorders in Camp ..."

Recruiting continued in 1777, with advertisements in the New York Gazette and the Weekly Mercury advising that recruits would "receive 40 shillings advance with new cloaths, arms and accoutrements and everything necessary to compleat a gentleman volunteer." The regiment was still well under strength in July, and Col. Alexander Innes, the Inspector General for Provincial Forces, reported that he was "sorry to say [they] are in a wretched state."

During the remainder of the year there were several altercations among the officers of the regiment, a state of affairs which recurred throughout the regiment's existence. In March 1778, Lt. Col. John Bayard (son of the founder of the regiment William) was charged with murdering one of his own officers, Lt. William Bird. Bayard was tried and found guilty of voluntary manslaughter, and sentenced to be suspended for three months and then removed from his command. This sentence was overturned on a technicality by the Judge Advocate General, but probably played a role in Bayard's subsequent difficulties in retaining his command. In August, Col. Innes received a letter from Edward Winslow in which he wrote:

I have in free conversation suggested my opinion to you that the Corps of King's Orange Rangers is at present in a position peculiarly alarming -- Feuds & dissensions among the Officers -- Mutinies and Desertions among the men ...

Whether the present Commandant is not sufficiently experienc'd in military matters? Or whether by any other means there is in officers and men a want of that confidence in him which is essential to order & discipline in a new Corps I know not -- but from the variety of unhappy events which have of late taken place, I apprehend one or the other.

I am sensible that on days of public parade -- such as Inspections and Musters -- there is not a provincial Corps in his Majesty's service more capable of distinguishing itself by a performance of military exercise & maneuvres sic than this -- nor is there a better body of men.

== Nova Scotia ==
On November 17, 1778 the KOR arrived by sea at Halifax, Nova Scotia. The reason for the transfer was probably to stem the rate of desertion by relocating the men to a place much farther away from their homes. The KOR was assigned to protect the Eastern Battery on the shore of Halifax harbour at the north end of Eastern Passage, where the community of Imperoyal now exists.

During the latter half of 1779, Capt. Robert Rotton and a recruiting party was sent to Newfoundland in a joint effort with Lt. Hector Maclean of the Royal Highland Emigrants. The two officers were quite successful, but did not finally leave St. John's, bound for New York, until December 17. Adverse winter winds made it impossible to reach the North American coast, so they changed course for the British Isles. On January 27, 1780, their vessel was wrecked on Bophin Island, Galway; 56 men died on passage or were drowned, while the survivors made their way to Halifax by the middle of that year. This expensive initiative did succeed in raising the strength of the regiment to 345 men.

At about this time, Lt. Col. Bayard learned of a plan to merge the KOR with the Royal Fencible Americans, which would entail Bayard losing his command. He wrote in protest to Brig. Gen. Francis McLean (British army officer), noting that he had already given up his commission with the 60th Regiment of Foot, and that the KOR currently had more men than the RFA. He wrote a similar letter to Sir Henry Clinton, the British C-in-C in North America. Clinton decided not to proceed with the plan at that time, but Bayard's position remained insecure.

=== Liverpool ===
In the 1770s, Liverpool was the second-largest settlement in Nova Scotia, after Halifax. Unlike Halifax, nearly everyone in Liverpool was a New England Planter. The town was at first sympathetic to the cause of the American Revolution, with outlying outports like Port Medway and Port Mouton almost continuously visited by American privateers, but after repeated attacks by American privateers on local shipping interests and one direct attack on the town itself, Liverpool citizens turned against the rebellion. Simeon Perkins wrote a successful appeal to the authorities in Halifax, and on December 13, 1778 Capt. John Howard's company of the KOR arrived aboard the transport Hannah. The company consisted of Howard, 2 lieutenants, 1 ensign, 3 sergeants, 2 or 3 corporals, 48 privates, and several camp followers, both women and children. During the next year the men assisted the locals in re-building Fort Morris (Nova Scotia) at what is today called Fort Point.

It was not long before the Rangers began to demonstrate the unreliability that had dogged them virtually from the time of their establishment. Six men deserted from Fort Point on February 9, 1779, stealing a boat and making for Port Mouton. This was the first of several such incidents. Relations with the townspeople were often strained due to petty thefts, break-ins of local stores, including Perkins', and suspicions of locals aiding deserters. On the other hand, a number of KOR men married local women. As Liverpool began to outfit privateers of their own, Howard bought shares and agreed to have his men serve as marines on board.

==== Raid on Liverpool (1780) ====
The most dramatic privateer raid occurred on September 13, 1780. Two American privateers, the Surprize under Cpt. Benjamin Cole, and the Delight, under Cpt. Lane, unloaded nearly 70 men at Ballast Cove shortly after midnight. By 4am they had captured the fort and taken Howard, two other officers, and all but six of the KOR garrison as prisoners. Perkins called out the militia, engineered the capture of Cole, and negotiated with Lane for the recovery of the fort and the release of the prisoners. Within a few hours "every thing [was] restored to its former Situation without any Blood Shed." Liverpool was not bothered by privateers for the remainder of the war. Most of Howard's company was ordered back to Halifax in mid-1781, but owing to appeals by the town's leaders, a detachment of 20 men under Lt. McLeod remained for the duration.

=== Port Williams ===
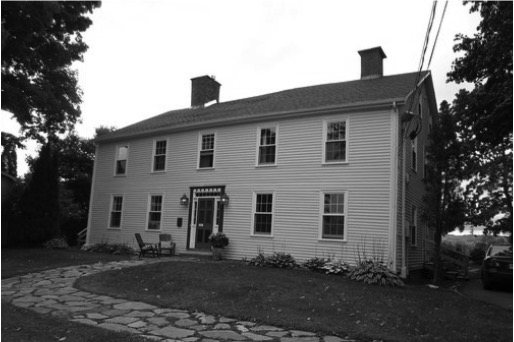
Fort Hughes, Starr's Point, Nova Scotia

At Port Williams, Nova Scotia, the threat of American privateer attacks had subsided. In the spring of 1781, Major Samuel Bayard was ordered to take a detachment of Rangers overland from Halifax to Fort Hughes (Nova Scotia) to overawe local Planters who were planning to erect a Liberty Pole and thereby break with the King. There they fixed bayonets and "with bright weapons glittering, colours flying and drums beating, they marched up Church Street and back to Town Plot, where the barracks stood." This show of force brought the locals back in line. Bayard took an interest in the Annapolis Valley, and after the war he took up a grant of 4,730 acres at Wilmot Mountain.

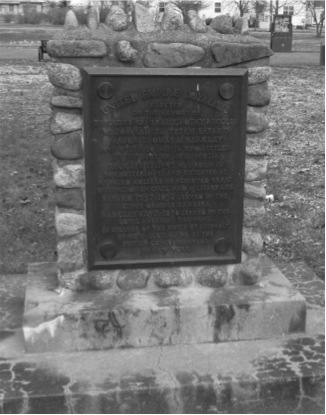
Monument to Samuel Bayard of the King's Orange Rangers, Middleton Park, Middleton, Nova Scotia, Canada

The reputation of the Regiment grew in these later years. A few months before disbandment, Brigadier-General Henry Edward Fox expressed:

... the great satisfaction he has received in seeing the two provincial battalions of Royal N.S. Volunteers and the King's Orange Rangers, and highly approves of their discipline and military appearance ...

The King's Orange Rangers were disbanded in the autumn of 1783. Those officers and men who wished received land grants in the area of Quaco, New Brunswick (now known as Fundy-St. Martins).

== Uniforms ==
In 1776, the men of the KOR mostly wore civilian clothing, essentially, whatever they were wearing when enlisted. Their first uniforms arrived in early 1777, green coats faced white, with white smallclothes, in common with most other Loyalist corps of the American command at that time. In keeping with their name, the regiment was issued with red coats faced orange from 1780 to their disbandment. As Rangers, their coats were most likely unlaced.

== See also ==
- Military history of Nova Scotia
- 84th Regiment of Foot (Royal Highland Emigrants)
- Nova Scotia in the American Revolution
