= Wilhelm von Knyphausen =

German military officer of Hesse-Kassel (1716–1800)

Reichsfreiherr Wilhelm von Innhausen und Knyphausen
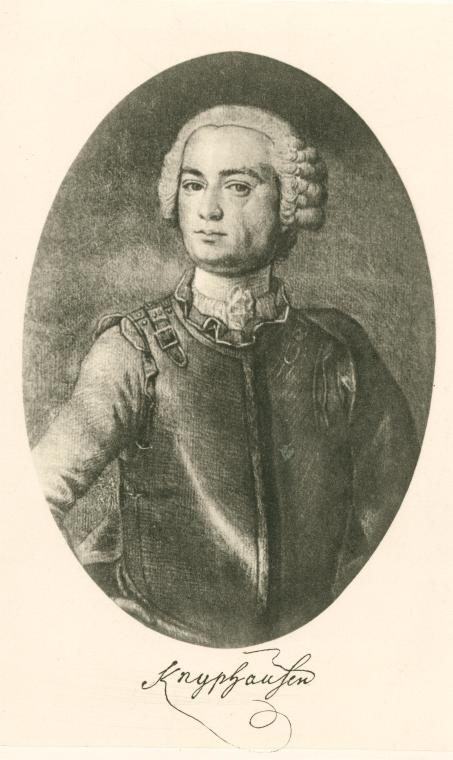
- Wilhelm von Knyphausen
- Born: 4 November 1716; Lütetsburg
- Died: 7 December 1800 (aged 84); Kassel, Hesse-Kassel
- Military career
- Allegiance: Prussia (1734–1775); Hesse-Kassel (1776–1782)
- Commands: Hessian auxiliaries (second-in-command)
- Conflicts: American Revolutionary War; Battle of White Plains; Battle of Fort Washington; Battle of Trenton; Battle of Brandywine; Battle of the Clouds; Battle of Germantown; Battle of White Marsh; Battle of Springfield; Battle of Monmouth

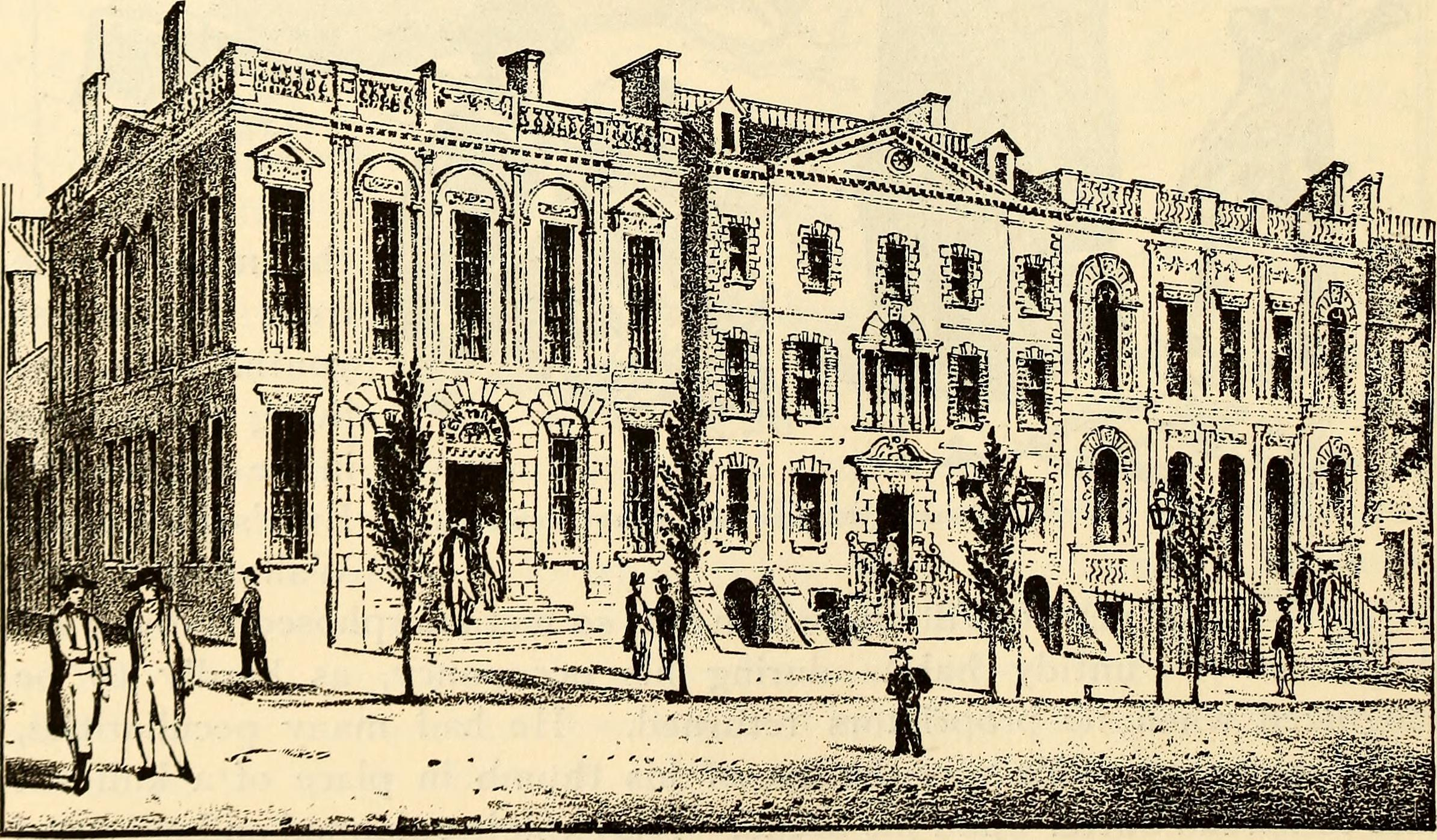
Knyphausen's Wall Street residence during the Revolution

Wilhelm Reichsfreiherr von Innhausen und Knyphausen (Note: Some documents produced after 1806 referred to him as Reichsfreiherr Wilhelm zu Innhausen und Knyphausen while some documents after 1919 use Wilhelm Reichsfreiherr zu Innhausen und Knyphausen.) (4 November 1716 Lütetsburg, East Frisia – 7 December 1800 Kassel) was a German general officer who served in Hesse-Kassel. He fought in the American Revolutionary War, during which he commanded Hessian auxiliaries on behalf of Great Britain.

== Biography ==
Knyphausen's father was the colonel of a Prussian regiment under the Duke of Marlborough. Educated in Berlin, the young Knyphausen entered the Prussian military service in 1734, and in 1775 he became a general officer in the army of Frederick the Great. In the army of Hesse-Cassel, he was a lieutenant general. In 1776, with 42 years of military experience, he came to the Thirteen Colonies of British North America as second-in-command of an army of 12,000 men called "Hessians" under General Heister.

Knyphausen led the Hessian troops in the Battles of White Plains, Fort Washington, Brandywine, Germantown, Springfield, and Monmouth. In 1779 and 1780, he commanded British-held New York City. When Heister left for Germany, Knyphausen took command of the German troops serving under Sir William Howe. Because of Knyphausen's seniority, British officers held dormant commissions outranking him in case the British commander became disabled. Despite this, Knyphausen was trusted by his British superiors.

Knyphausen's regiment took part in the attack on Fort Washington and was in garrison at Trenton, New Jersey. Major von Dechow, who was in command in late 1776, warned Colonel Johann Rall to fortify the town, advice that was ignored. During the Battle of Trenton the regiment tried to escape across Assunpink Creek but was forced to surrender. Dechow was mortally wounded during the battle.

Sir William Howe gave Knyphausen responsibility for commanding the right flank at the Brandywine, tasked with keeping the attention of the Continental commanders on the river line at Chadds Ford, Pennsylvania. He also commanded the vanguard of the army withdrawing from Philadelphia at the time of the Battle of Monmouth.

For several years the main body of Knyphausen's force occupied the upper part of Manhattan Island, and during the temporary absence of Sir Henry Clinton in 1780, he was in command of the city.

Knyphausen's regiment served in the Americas from 1776 to 1783. Knyphausen left the North American theater in 1782 in part because of ill health, including blindness in one eye caused by a cataract. His wife had died in 1778. Friedrich Wilhelm von Lossberg succeeded to command of the Hessian troops in New York.

Knyphausen returned to Europe, having, as he said, achieved neither glory nor advancement, but near the end of his life he became military governor of Cassel. He was a taciturn and discreet officer, who understood the temper of his troops and rarely entered on hazardous exploits. His was a hireling army of recruits gathered from work-houses and by impressment, drilled in the use of arms on shipboard. As he frequently declared, on such forces a judicious commander could place little reliance; they dwindled less by death than by desertion.

In 1785, shortly after the end of the war, General Lafayette travelled to Cassel and met Knyphausen. He wrote to General Washington that they had reminisced about the war and exchanged compliments. Knyphausen died in 1800 as the result of an eye surgery.

== Legacy ==
Fort Hill Park in Staten Island, New York is the site of what was once called Fort Knyphausen, an earthen redoubt built to fend off Patriot forces. One of the streets of Glasgow, Delaware is called North General Knyphausen Court.

== See also ==
- Germans in the American Revolution
