= Simeon Perkins =

Canadian politician

Col. Simeon Perkins
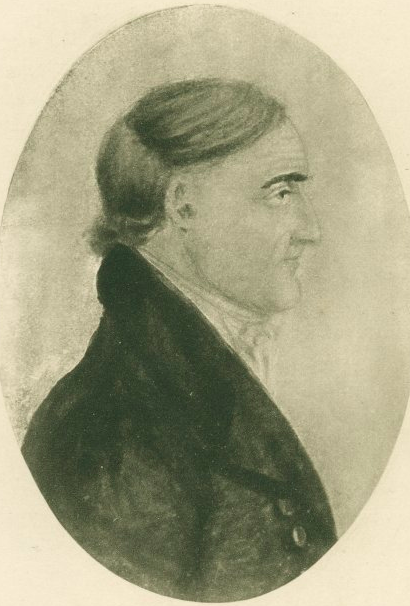
- Born: February 24, 1735; Norwich, Connecticut
- Died: May 9, 1812 (aged 77); Liverpool, Nova Scotia
- Occupations: Merchant, judge, politician, militia leader, and diarist
- Known for: Writing a diary from 1766 until he died
- Title: Member of the Nova Scotia House of Assembly for Queens County
- Term: 1765-68, 1770-99
- Political party: Independent
- Spouse: Abigail Perkins (m. 1759; died 1760) Elizabeth Perkins (m. 1775)
- Children: 9

Colonel Simeon Perkins (February 24, 1735 – May 9, 1812) was a Nova Scotia militia leader, merchant, diarist and politician. Perkins led the defence of Liverpool from attacks during the American Revolution, French Revolutionary Wars and the Napoleonic Wars. In the 1770s, Liverpool was the second-largest settlement in Nova Scotia, next to Halifax. He also funded privateer ships in defence of the colony. He wrote a diary for 46 years (1766–1812), which is an essential historic document of this time period in Nova Scotian history. His home is now the Perkins House Museum. He was the grandfather of Joshua Newton Perkins.

== Military career ==
He was lieutenant-colonel of the county militia from 1772 to 1793, he served as colonel commandant from 1793 to 1807. During the American Revolution, he defended the town numerous times from attack by American privateers. There were five raids on the town: October 1776, March 1777, September 1777, May 1778, and September 1780. He also went on the offensive by funding various privateer ships of his own to attack American privateers.

A month after HMS Blonde defeated Duc de Choiseul, on May 1, 1778, American privateers raided Liverpool, ravaging and pillaging a number of the houses and stores, including the store of Simeon Perkins. Three weeks later, on May 21, the same privateers returned and tried to tow the wreck of Duc de Choiseul out to sea. Perkins mustered ten men at the shore. Cannon fire was exchanged by the British militia and the American privateers. The privateers continued to fire at the town for almost an hour. Perkins marched his men along the shore, closer to the privateers. One of the militia was wounded in the ensuing exchanges. The privateers stayed off shore for a number of days. Perkins kept a sergeant and six men on guard duty twenty four hours a day until the privateers left the area.

After suffering three years of similar sporadic raids, Perkins, on June 2, 1779, built a battery for the artillery and on October 31 launched their own privateer vessel named Lucy to bring battle to their adversaries. As well, Perkins wrote a successful appeal to the authorities in Halifax, and on December 13, 1778 Captain John Howard's company of the King's Orange Rangers arrived aboard the transport Hannah. The company consisted of Howard, 2 lieutenants, 1 ensign, 3 sergeants, 2 or 3 corporals, 48 privates, and several camp followers, both women and children.

The most dramatic defense of Liverpool occurred on September 13, 1780. Two American privateers, Surprize under Captain Benjamin Cole, and Delight, under Captain Lane, unloaded nearly 70 men at Ballast Cove shortly after midnight. By 4am they had captured the fort and taken Howard, two other officers, and all but six of the KOR garrison as prisoners. Perkins called out the militia, engineered the capture of Cole, and ransomed him and the others for the recovery of the fort and the release of the prisoners. Liverpool was not bothered by privateers for the remainder of the war.

Perkins also invested in privateering during the Napoleonic Wars, earning substantial returns from vessels such as the ships Charles Mary Wentworth, Duke of Kent and the famous brig Rover

== Politician ==
A born leader, he held public office for a long period representing Queens County in the Nova Scotia House of Assembly from 1765 to 1768 and from 1770 to 1799. He held twenty-seven government positions in his lifetime, none of which paid, including justice of the peace, colonel of the militia, and judge in the Inferior Court of Common Pleas and the Court of Quarter Sessions.

== Family ==
Perkins was born in Norwich, Connecticut, one of sixteen children of Jacob Perkins and Jemima Leonard. He came to Liverpool, Nova Scotia, in May 1762 as part of the New England Planter migration to Nova Scotia. In Liverpool, Perkins immediately began trading in fish and lumber and forged trading ties with New England, Newfoundland, Europe and the West Indies.

He had nine children from two marriages. His first wife, Abigail Backus, died four weeks after the birth of his first son Roger (1760-1780). He married again in 1775 to Mrs. Elizabeth Headley (Young) who had been widowed two months before the birth of her daughter Ruth (1768-1814). Together, the Perkins had Abigail (1776-1819), John (1778-1849), Lucy (1780-1817), Elizabeth "Betsey" (1783-1856), Eunice (1785-1813), Mary (1786-1814), Simeon Leonard (1788-1822), and Charlotte Ann (1790-1837).

== Diary ==
His diary, which he began in 1766, remains a vital source for historians studying the society and economy of colonial Canada and notably the battle for identity and loyalty during the American Revolution. Perkins was at first neutral, but became increasingly loyal to the British cause. After relentless American privateer attacks on shipping and an attempted American looting of Liverpool itself, Perkins helped lead the defences of the town and outfitted several privateer ships against the Americans.

One of his diary entries, for October 12, 1796 allegedly contains the first report of a UFO sighting in modern North America. Perkins reports the tale circulating at the time of a young lady and two men living at New Minas, Nova Scotia on upper reaches of the Bay of Fundy, who, during a recent sunrise, saw as many as fifteen “ships in the air ... and a man forward with his hand stretched out.” Perkins continues, "the story did not obtain universal credit but some people believed it."

The original copies of Perkins diaries were donated to the Town of Liverpool in 1899 and are now held by the Queens County Museum in Liverpool. The diary was published in five volumes by the Champlain Society between 1948 and 1967. The diaries are now available online.

== Perkins House Museum ==
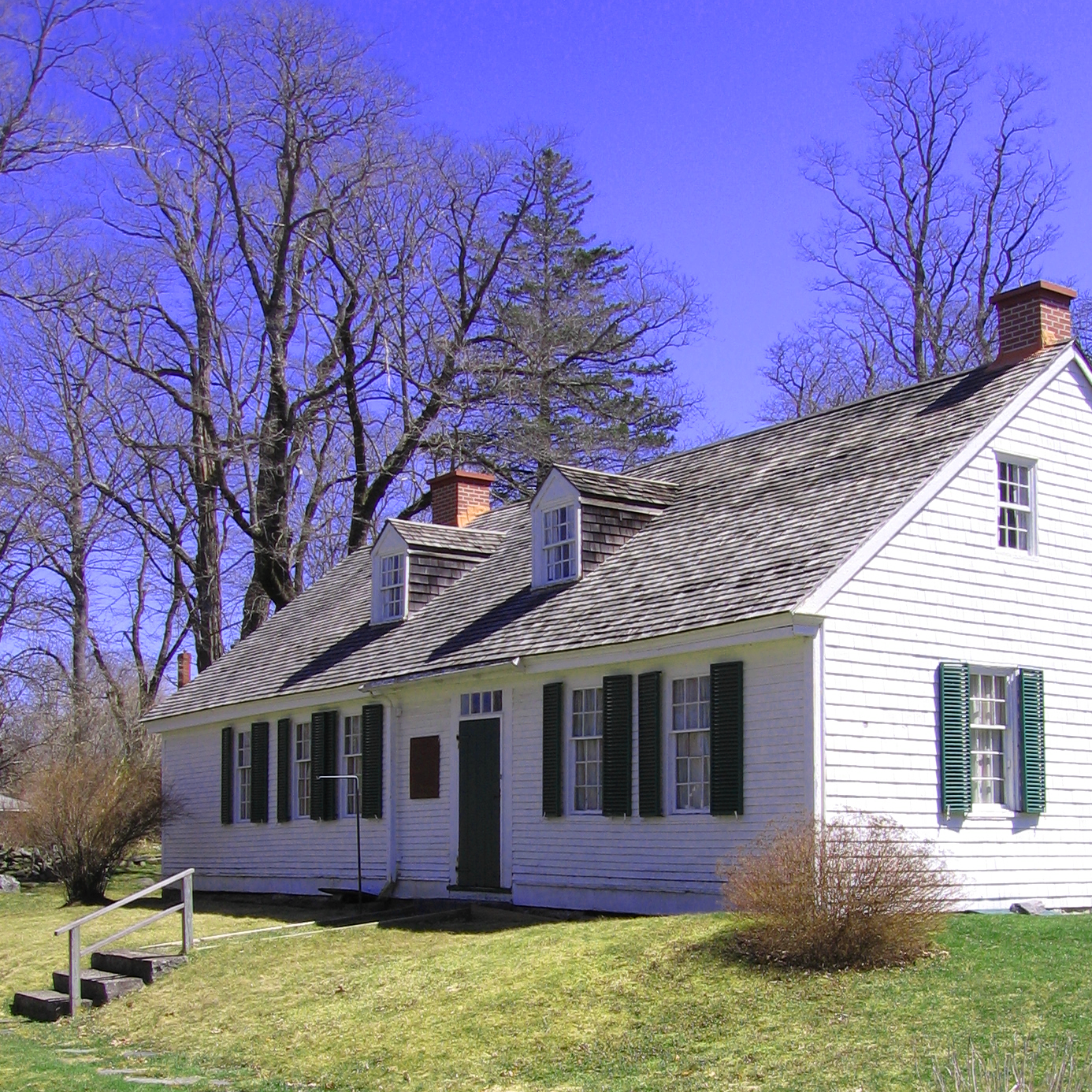
Simeon Perkins' house in Liverpool, Nova Scotia has been preserved as a museum. It was built in 1766.

Perkins' home was preserved through the efforts of the Queens County Historical Society in 1949 led by the author and historian Thomas Raddall. It opened as the Perkins House Museum in 1957 and became part of the Nova Scotia Museum system, the oldest building owned by the province.

It became a popular tourism draw in Liverpool open every year during the summer. However the house was closed to the public in 2015 after the province, citing shifting floor beams deemed the building a safety hazard. Repairs were completed in 2021 after delays due to the COVID-19 pandemic. The museum reopened in June 2021.

The Perkins House Museum was permanently shutdown by the Nova Scotia government in 2026, as part of a larger museum operations budget cut to the Department of Communities, Culture, Tourism and Heritage.

== See also ==
- Military history of Nova Scotia
- Nova Scotia in the American Revolution
