= Wilmot, Nova Scotia =

Community in Nova Scotia, Canada

Coordinates: 44°57′24.85″N 65°0′25.68″W

Wilmot in Nova Scotia

Wilmot is an unincorporated community located in Annapolis County in the Canadian province of Nova Scotia.

The community takes its name from Wilmot Township, one of the early subdivisions of Annapolis County. The township was named after Montague Wilmot, a colonial governor of Nova Scotia. The township, which included what is now Aylesford, was granted in 1764 to New England settlers. In 1768 it had a population of 40; by 1827 it had grown to 2,294.

The first major land owner, a magistrate named Philip Richardson, was granted seven lots totaling 2,000 acres (809 ha) in 1777. Brigadier General Timothy Ruggles was granted 10,000 acres (4047 ha) in 1784.

== Notable people ==
- Samuel Vetch Bayard (1757-1832). Military officer.
- Timothy Ruggles (1711-1795). Politician, jurist, military leader.
- Joshua Slocum (1844-1909). First man to navigate single-handedly around the world.
