= Port Medway, Nova Scotia =

Community in Nova Scotia, Canada

Coordinates: 44°7′33″N 64°34′26″W

Port Medway in Nova Scotia

Port Medway is a community in the Canadian province of Nova Scotia, located in the Region of Queens Municipality.

== History ==
Port Medway was settled by United Empire Loyalists via Land Petitions/Memorials in the 1780s.

Because of its deep harbor, the town originally housed a significant wooden shipbuilding industry owned by the Wylde family. At its most prosperous, over 5,000 inhabitants lived and worked there. When the industry disappeared the population dwindled to a few hundred residents.

After the historic lighthouse was decommissioned, it was purchased by Queens County and restored in 2002.
