= Nova Scotia in the American Revolution =

Nova Scotia theatre
- Part of the American Revolutionary War
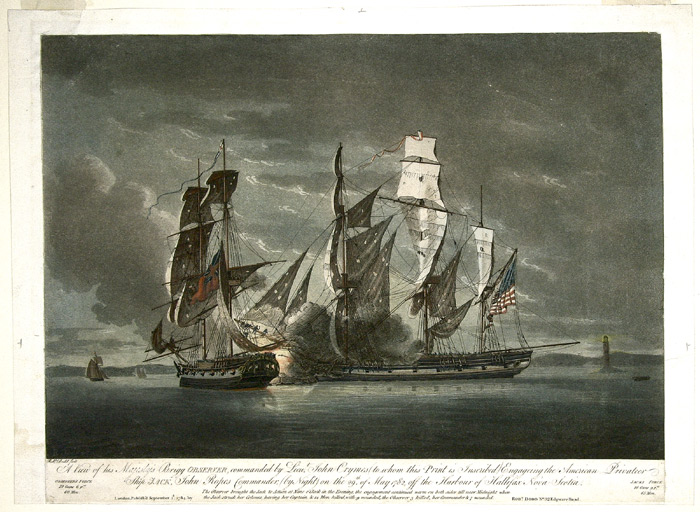
- Naval battle off Halifax (1782)
Date	12 July 1775 – 5 September 1782
Location	Nova Scotia
Result	British victory: American forces driven from Nova Scotia

Belligerents
United Colonies (1775-1781); United States (1781-1782); Kingdom of France	Great Britain

Commanders and leaders
(United States) George Washington (United States) Jeremiah O'Brien (United States) John Paul Jones (United States) Jonathan Eddy (United States) Benoni Danks (United States) John Allan (United States) John Manley (United States) Hector McNeill (United States) Louis-René Levassor (United States) Noah Stoddard (United States) George Wait Babcock (United States) Herbert Woodbury (United States) William Williams (United States) Joseph Olney (United States) David Ropes † (United States) John Selman (United States) Nicholson Broughton (Kingdom of France) Latouche Tréville (Kingdom of France) La Pérouse	(Kingdom of Great Britain) Thomas Gage (Kingdom of Great Britain) Sir William Howe (Kingdom of Great Britain) John Creighton (POW) (Kingdom of Great Britain) Dittlieb Jessen (Kingdom of Great Britain) Joseph Pernette (Kingdom of Great Britain) Phillips Callbeck (POW) (Kingdom of Great Britain) Joseph Goreham (Kingdom of Great Britain) Thomas Dixson (Kingdom of Great Britain) Gilfred Studholme (Kingdom of Great Britain) Michael Francklin (Kingdom of Great Britain) George Collier (Kingdom of Great Britain) John Brisbane (Kingdom of Great Britain) Simeon Perkins (Kingdom of Great Britain) Benjamin Belcher (Kingdom of Great Britain) Jonathan Crane (Kingdom of Great Britain) Phineas Lovett (Kingdom of Great Britain) Jonathan Prescott (Kingdom of Great Britain) Captain Henry Francis Evans † (Kingdom of Great Britain) Captain Rupert George (Kingdom of Great Britain) Richard Peter Tonge (POW)

Nova Scotia during the American Revolution was an important factor in the British war effort. The most northern British colony on the Atlantic coast of North America, the Province of Nova Scotia did not join with the Thirteen Colonies, which fought for independence, achieving it with aid from European allies. At the outbreak, there was ambivalence in Nova Scotia over whether the colony should join the Americans in the war against Britain, and it was "almost the 14th American Colony." Largely as a result of American privateer raids on Nova Scotia villages, as the war continued, the population of Nova Scotia solidified their support for the British. Thousands of Loyalist refugees fled to Nova Scotia during the war, and many were resettled in the region after the signing of the 1783 Treaty of Paris as "United Empire Loyalists". With the influx of Loyalist refugees, Nova Scotia was subdivided, creating New Brunswick in 1784.

== Background ==
In Nova Scotia was the traditional territory of the Mi'kmaq and then settled by the Catholic French Acadians, the British conquering a portion of the territory in 1710, but did not immediately settle it. With the establishment of the deepwater port of Halifax, which became the capital, the British began asserting control over the territory as a counter to French power in North America. Halifax became the North American station for the Royal Navy in 1759. Starting in 1755, the British took action against continuing Acadian attacks by forcibly expelling the Acadians, an estimated 14,000 over several years. Their lands were opened to English and Scots settlers. New Englanders, used to the harsh climate, came in fairly large numbers.

New Englanders objected to the British imposition of the Stamp Act 1765, but recent British immigrants and London-oriented business interests based in the port of Halifax the provincial capital, were more influential in keeping the colony loyal to the crown. The only major public protest was the hanging in effigy of the stamp distributor and Lord Bute. The act was implemented in both provinces, but Nova Scotia's stamp distributor resigned in January 1766, beset by ungrounded fears for his safety. Authorities there were ordered to allow ships bearing unstamped papers to enter its ports, and business continued unabated after the distributors ran out of stamps.

== 1775–1778 ==
At the outbreak of the American Revolution, many Nova Scotians were New England-born and were sympathetic to the American Patriots. This support slowly eroded over the first two years of the war as American privateers attacked Nova Scotian villages and shipping to try to interrupt Nova Scotian trade with the American Loyalists still in New England. During the war, American privateers captured 225 vessels either leaving or arriving at Nova Scotia ports.

In June 1775, the Americans had their first naval victory over the British in the Battle of Machias where American privateer Jeremiah O'Brien and the men of Machias, Maine, captured a British war ship. In response to this defeat, in July 1775, the British sent from Halifax two armed sloops to Machias to capture the rebel captain and his men. On July 12, 1775, Jeremiah O'Brien sailing his schooner, the Machias Liberty, acting in concert with Colonel Benjamin Foster (in an East Machias schooner) captured these two British vessels in the Bay of Fundy.

The following month American privateers from Machias executed their third consecutive victory in the region by raiding St John. (Note: For other reasons why Nova Scotia didn't join in the rebellion see: Cahill (1996), pp. 52–70 Stewart, Gordon Thomas; Rawlyk, George A. (1972). A People Highly Favoured of God: The Nova Scotia Yankees and the American Revolution. Archon. ISBN 978-0-208-01283-8. Armstrong, Maurice (1946). "Neutrality and Religion in Revolutionary Nova Scotia". The New England Quarterly. 19 (1): 50–62. doi:10.2307/361206. JSTOR 361206.)

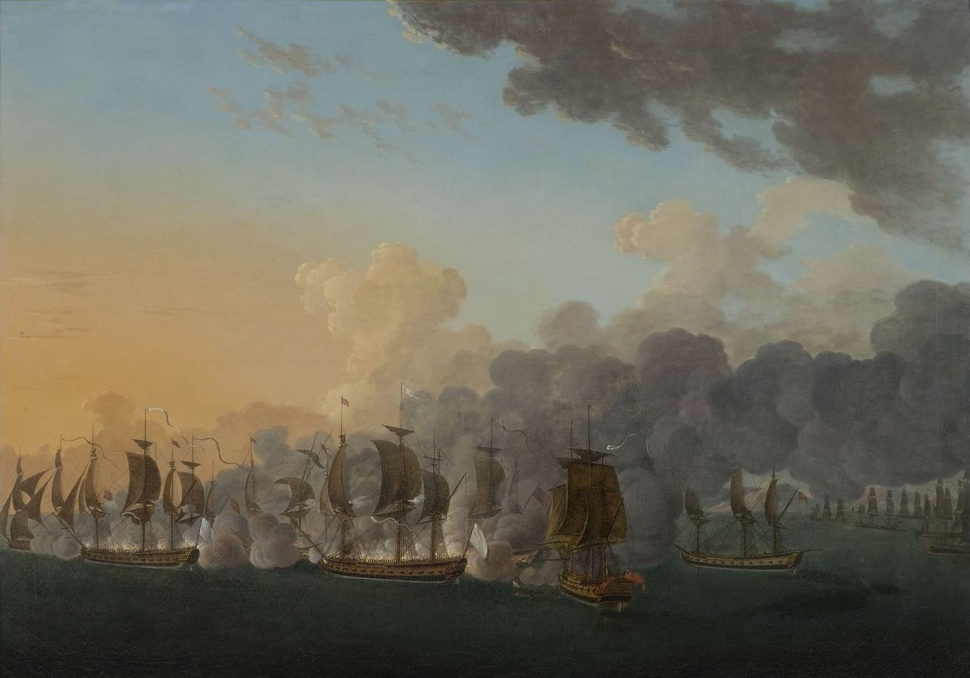
Naval battle off Cape Breton (1781)

In retaliation for the American victories at Machias and St. John, the British burned Falmouth (present-day Portland, Maine) in October 1775. The following month, in November 1775, the American Patriots retaliated by ships Hancock and Franklin from Marblehead raiding Charlottetown and Canso, Nova Scotia, where they took five prizes. (In the raid on Charlottetown, the privateers also sought revenge against Nathaniel Coffin, the Loyalist who cut down the Liberty Tree in Boston.) The first year of the war ended with the American privateer raid on Yarmouth, Nova Scotia.

In 1775, rebellion began to foment within Nova Scotia. Governor Legge began to target prominent Protestant dissenters of the St. Matthew's Church: John Fillis and judge William Smith and John Frost (minister). The Governor also targeted judge Seth Harding from the Liverpool Township and he left on October 1775 and did not return. According to Cahill, as a result of "instances of non-legal repression and petty tyranny, such as the summary dismissals of Judge Smith and Justice Frost, had ended with the recall of Governor Legge [to London] in January 1776."

A small number of Nova Scotians went south to serve with the Continental Army against the British; upon the completion of the war these rebels were granted land in the Refugee Tract in what later became Ohio.

In 1776, there was also armed rebellion such as the Maugerville Rebellion (1776). The other attack was by land and led by Jonathan Eddy who led the Battle of Fort Cumberland. According to historian Barry Cahill, this rebellion led the Nova Scotia government to "use the formal law in sedition trials for an essential aspect of the official response to the American Revolution." The government arraigned dissenters John Seccombe and jailed Timothy Houghton for sedition (incitement to rebellion). Malachy Salter was convicted of sedition in 1777.

At the end of 1776, there were two significant American attacks on Nova Scotia. One of these assaults was by sea and led by John Paul Jones in the raid on Canso. In 1776, John Allan led the Maliseet to challenge the loyalists on Indian Island, New Brunswick, to join the rebel cause. In 1776, two American privateers took four vessels at Cape Forchu, Nova Scotia, and took the people of the hamlet prisoners.

In March 1777, in the first Continental Navy encounter with the Royal Navy, HMS Milford captured USS Cabot in the battle off Yarmouth. The crew of Cabot escaped to find protection among the local village, and two inhabitants of Yarmouth sheltered them for 30 days until they made their escape back to New England. The engagement between Milford and Cabot was one of several in the region. On 2 May 1777, in the Minas Basin Captain Collet ordered the capture the American privateer schooner Sea Duck, under the command of John Bohannan. He had the vessel taken to Windsor. In June, the American Patriots launched the St. John River expedition. In July 1777, HMS Amazon captured the privateer Active off of Cape Sable Island. In August 1777, the British raided Machias.

The following year, in April 1778 the American privateers again attacked Liverpool. On 9 August, American privateers attacked Cornwallis at present-day Kentville, which resulted in the British building Fort Hughes in the area. The fort could hold 56 soldiers. In 1778, the British schooner Hope also defeated an American privateer ship at Canso. Seven Patriots escaped but were later captured near Halifax. Prisoners were returned from Halifax to Boston on the Swift in September 1778. The Cartel Silver Eel took prisoners to Boston in October 1778. In 1779 Maugerville was raided again by Maliseets working with John Allan in Machias, Maine. A vessel was captured and two or three residents' homes were plundered. In response, a blockhouse was built at the mouth of Oromocto River also named Fort Hughes (named after the Lieutenant Governor of Nova Scotia, Sir Richard Hughes). In June 1779, the British troops at Windsor captured 12 American privateers in the Bay of Fundy, where they cruised in a large boat, armed, plundering the vessels and the inhabitants. In 1779, American privateers returned to Canso and destroyed the fisheries, which were worth £50,000 a year to Britain. (Note: Lieutenant Governor Sir Richard Hughes stated in a dispatch to Lord Germaine that "rebel cruisers" made the attack.)

== 1779–1782 ==
In 1779 the British from Halifax adopted a strategy to seize parts of Maine, especially around Penobscot Bay, and make it a new colony to be called New Ireland. It was intended to be a permanent colony for Loyalists and a base for military action during the war.

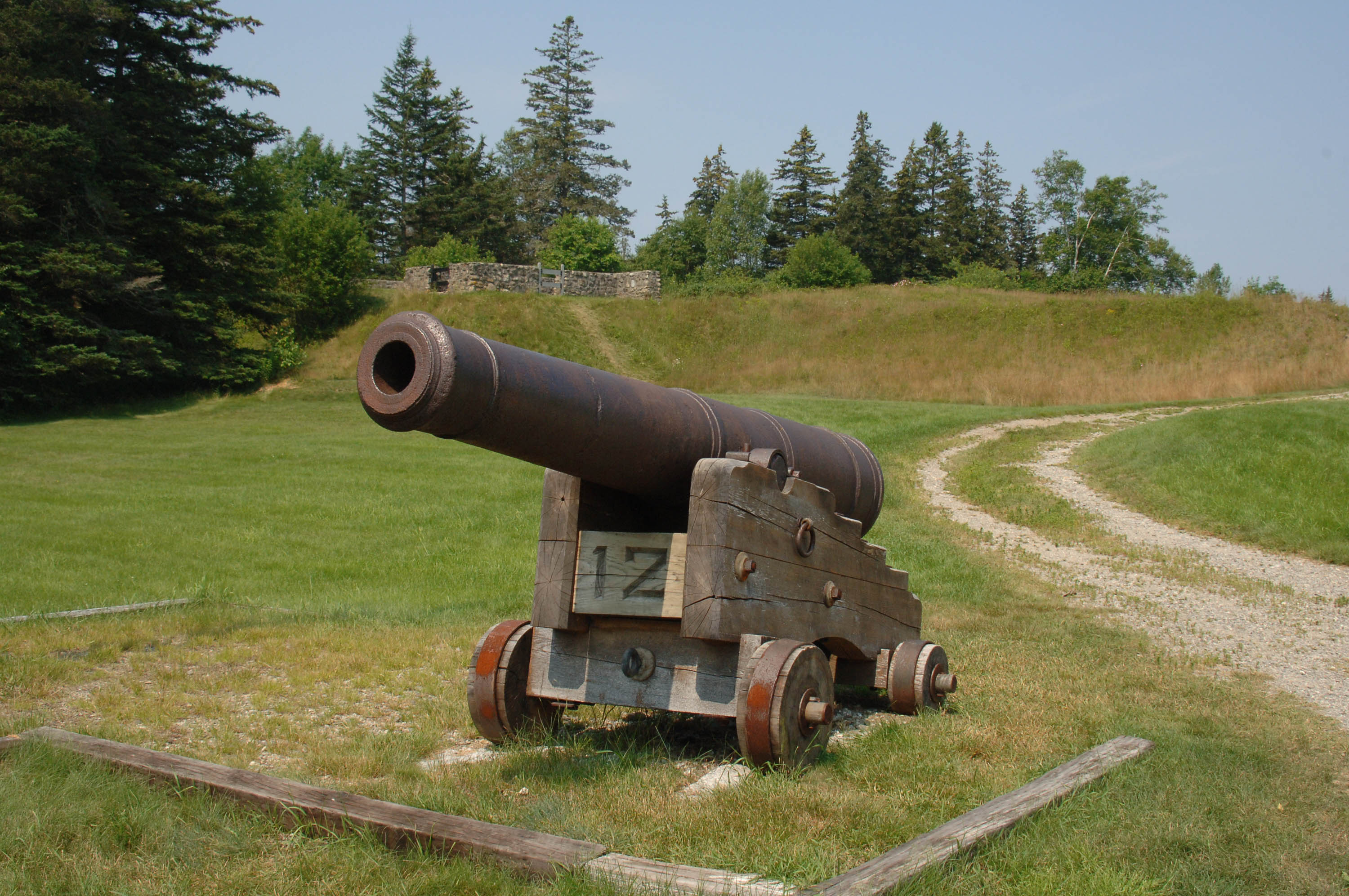
Fort George (Castine, Maine) – British fort built to protect New Ireland

In early July 1779, Francis McLean left Halifax and led a British naval and military force into Castine's commodious harbor, landed troops, and took control of the village. He began erecting Fort George on one of the highest points of the peninsula. Alarmed by this incursion, the Commonwealth of Massachusetts sent the Penobscot Expedition to lay siege to the fort and reclaim the territory. The siege started on July 25 and lasted three weeks until the arrival of British commander George Collier who defeated the American expedition. (The British held New Ireland, the planned loyalist homeland, until the end of the war. Instead, the British divided Nova Scotia and named the new Loyalist homeland New Brunswick.)

At the end of 1779, the British at Halifax experienced some significant losses. In December 1779 the schooner Hope wrecked near the Sambro Island Light on the Three Sisters Rocks. Captain Henry Baldwin and six other crew were killed. Weeks later, 170 British sailors died when two vessels – North and St Helena – were wrecked in a storm when entering Halifax harbour.

On 10 July 1780, in the Battle off Halifax, the British privateer brig Resolution (16 guns) under the command of Thomas Ross engaged the American privateer Viper (22 guns and 130 men) off Halifax at Sambro Light. In what one observer described as "one of the bloodiest battles in the history of privateering", the two privateers began a "severe engagement" during which both pounded each other with cannon fire for about 90 minutes. The engagement resulted in the surrender of Resolution and the death of up to 18 British and 33 American sailors. (Note: There are varying reports on the number of casualties. Another source indicates that the Americans reported between 3 died (British reporting 30 American died), while British reported 8 killed and 10 wounded.)

In May 1781, the local Nova Scotia militia defeated American privateers in the Battle off Cape Split. The British and French also clashed in the Naval battle off Cape Breton. Finally, the privateers returned in the Raid on Annapolis Royal (1781). In the final year of attacks on Nova Scotia, the American privateers fought in the Naval battle off Halifax and the Raid on Lunenburg (1782).

== Defence regiments ==
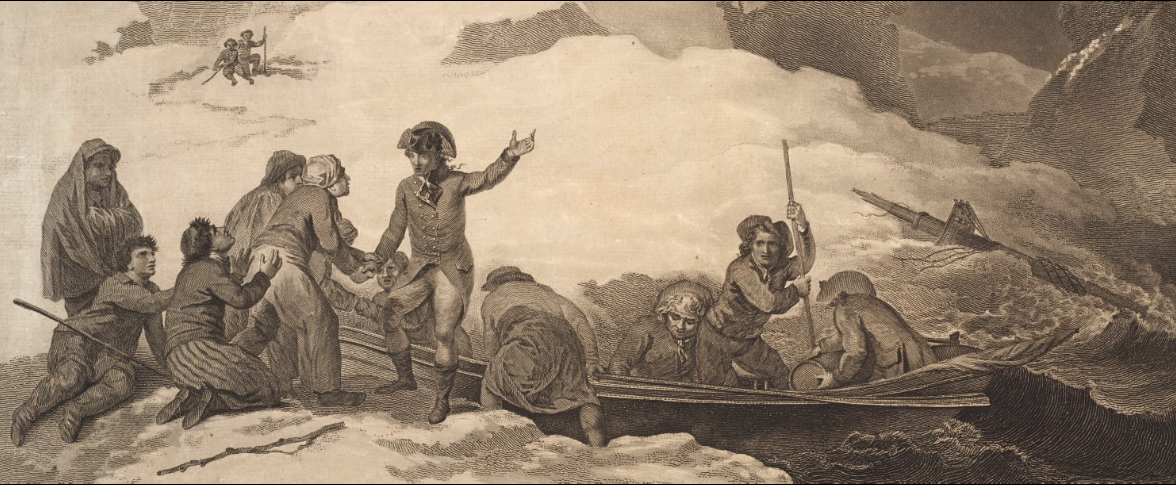
Samuel Waller Prentice, 84th Regiment (1st battalion), 4 January 1780, shipwrecked off Cape Breton, Nova Scotia by Robert Pollard (1784)

To guard against American privateer attacks, the 84th Regiment of Foot (Royal Highland Emigrants) (2nd battalion) was garrisoned at forts around Atlantic Canada. Fort Edward (Nova Scotia) in Windsor, Nova Scotia was the Regiment's headquarters to prevent a possible American land assault on Halifax from the Bay of Fundy. Also raised in Nova Scotia were the Royal Fencible American Regiment and the Royal Nova Scotia Volunteer Regiment. The King's Orange Rangers defended Liverpool, the second largest settlement in the colony. The Hessians also served in Nova Scotia for five years (1778–1783). They protected the colony from American privateers, such as when they responded to the Raid on Lunenburg (1782). They were led by Baron Oberst Franz Carl Erdmann von Seitz. There were 5000 British troops in Nova Scotia by 1778.

== Naval defence ==
In terms of naval force, along with issuing letters of marque for different privateering vessels, the government in 1776 retained the armed schooner Loyal Nova Scotian (8 guns, 28 men). On November 26, 1776, under the command of John Alexander, the Loyal Nova Scotian re-captured the privateer Friendship. In 1778, the vessel was ordered to Lunenburg and then retired. By 1779, Nova Scotia's naval defence had four vessels: a frigate (32 guns), sloop of war (18 guns), armed schooner (14 guns) and another armed schooner (10 guns). These ships were named Revenge (18 guns, 50 men, Captain Jones Fawson; Captain James Gandy), Buckram (8 guns, 20 men, Captain Archibald Allardice) and the armed schooner Insulter (Captain John Sheppard), all acting under government orders. There were numerous other privateers supported by local villages: Enterprise (Liverpool), Hero (100 men, 16 guns, Captain Bailey, Chester), Arbuthnot, The David, Mowatt, Lady Hammond, The Fly, Sir George Hammond, Lancaster, Dreadnought (Captain Dean of Liverpool), The Success, The Lively, the sloop Howe, and the ship Jack.

In 1778, Nova Scotian ships had taken at least 48 prizes and four recaptures. Between 1779 and 1781, they captured 42.

== Treaty of Watertown ==
In 1776, the Mi'kmaq signed the Treaty of Watertown and agreed to support the American Patriots against the American Loyalists. Three years later, on 7 June 1779, the Mi'kmaq "delivered up" the treaty to Nova Scotia Governor Michael Francklin and re-established Mi'kmaw loyalty to the British. After the British resounding victory over the American Penobscot Expedition, according to Mi'kmaw historian Daniel Paul, Mi'kmaq in present-day New Brunswick renounced the Watertown treaty and signed a treaty of alliance with the British on 24 September 1779.

== American Revolution gallery ==
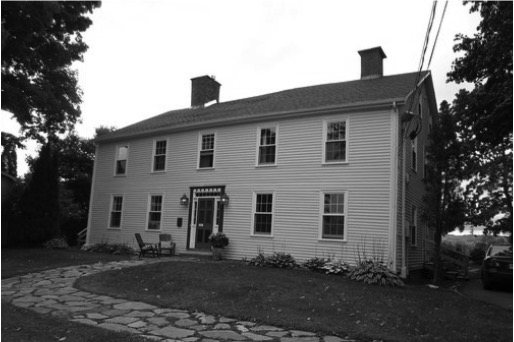
Fort Hughes/ Planters' Barracks (1778)

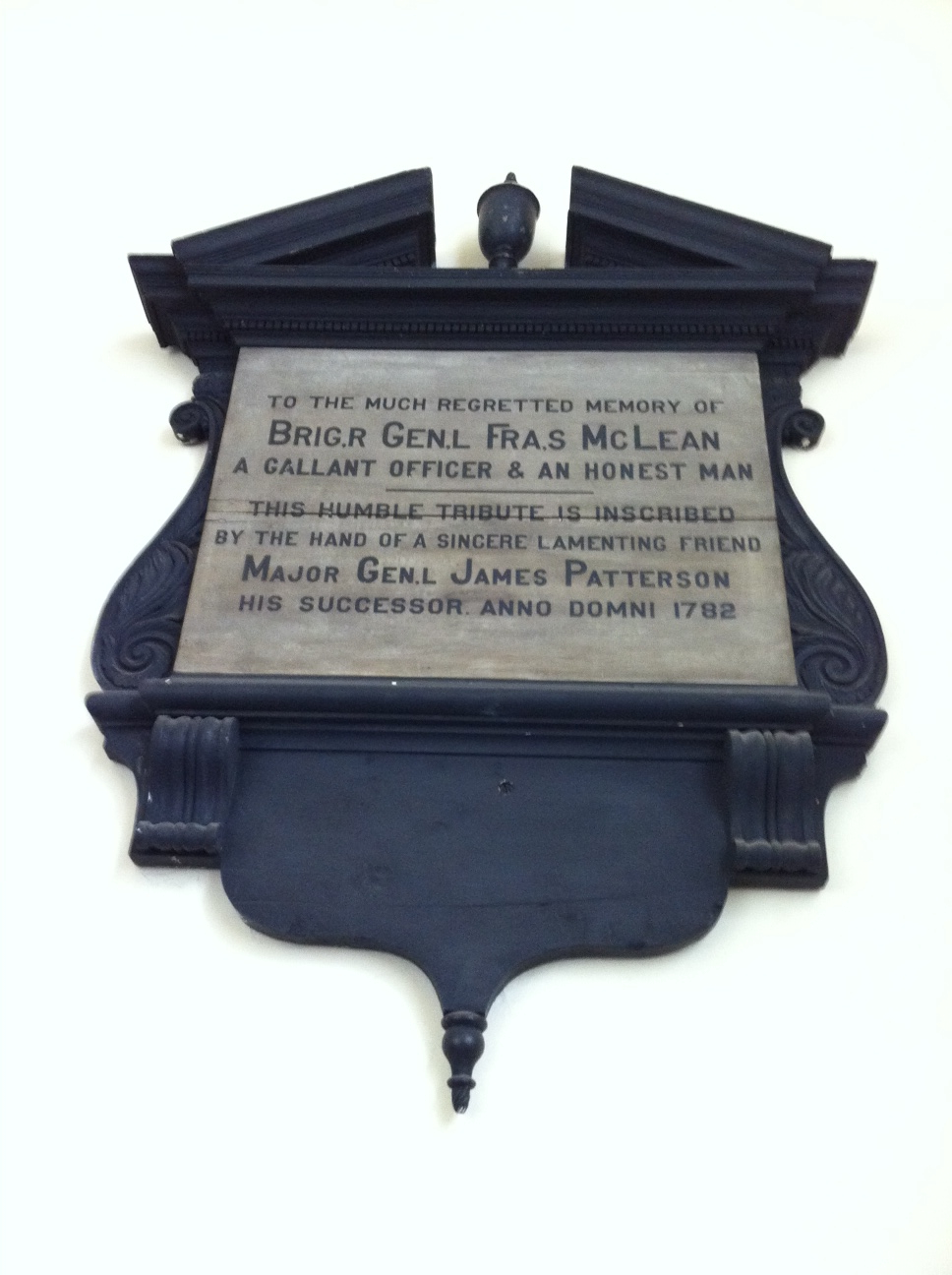
Francis McLean established and defended New Ireland (Maine), Plaque, St. Paul's Church (Halifax), Nova Scotia

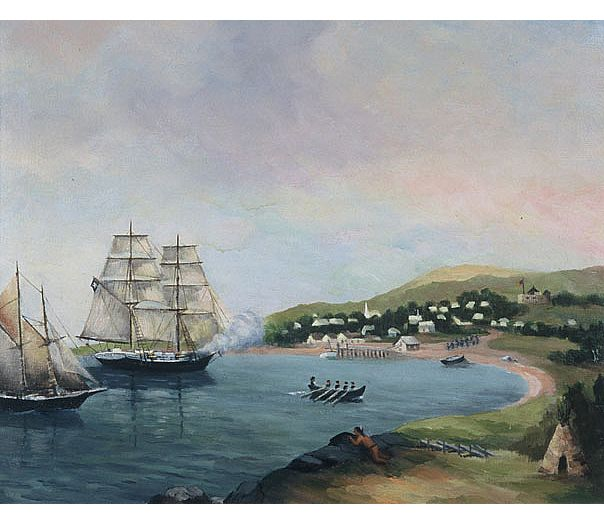
Raid on Lunenburg (1782)

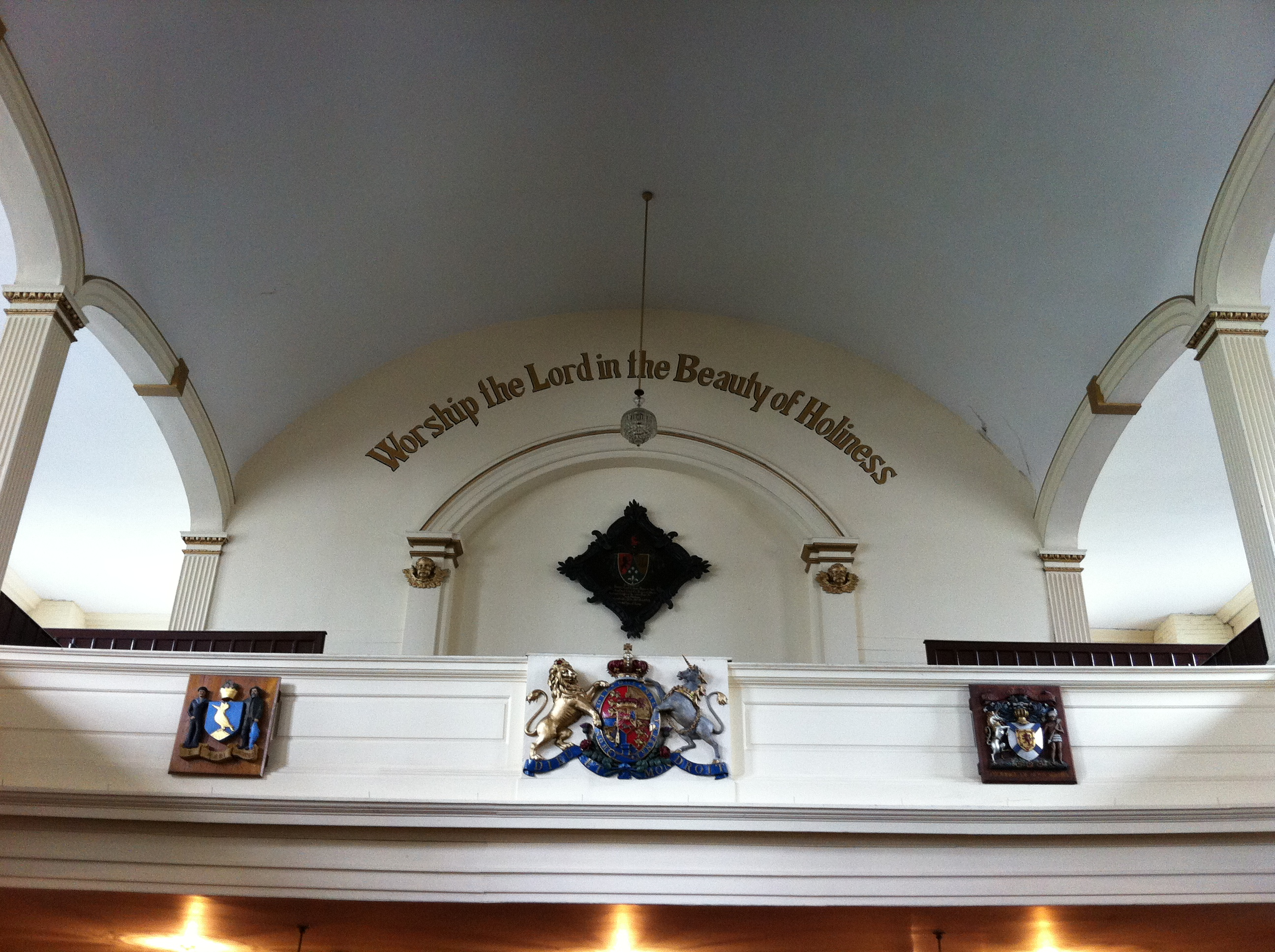
Hatchment of Baron Oberst Franz Carl Erdmann von Seitz, St. Paul's Church (Halifax), Nova Scotia, d.1782

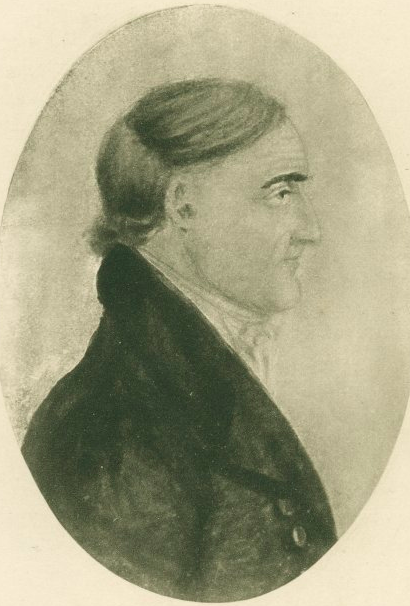
Col Simeon Perkins

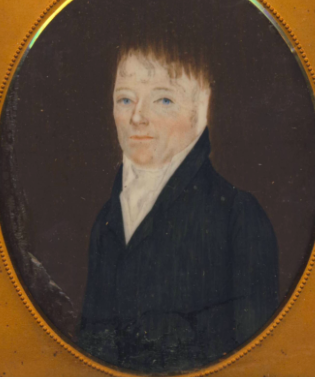
Jonathan Prescott

== St. John's Island and Newfoundland ==
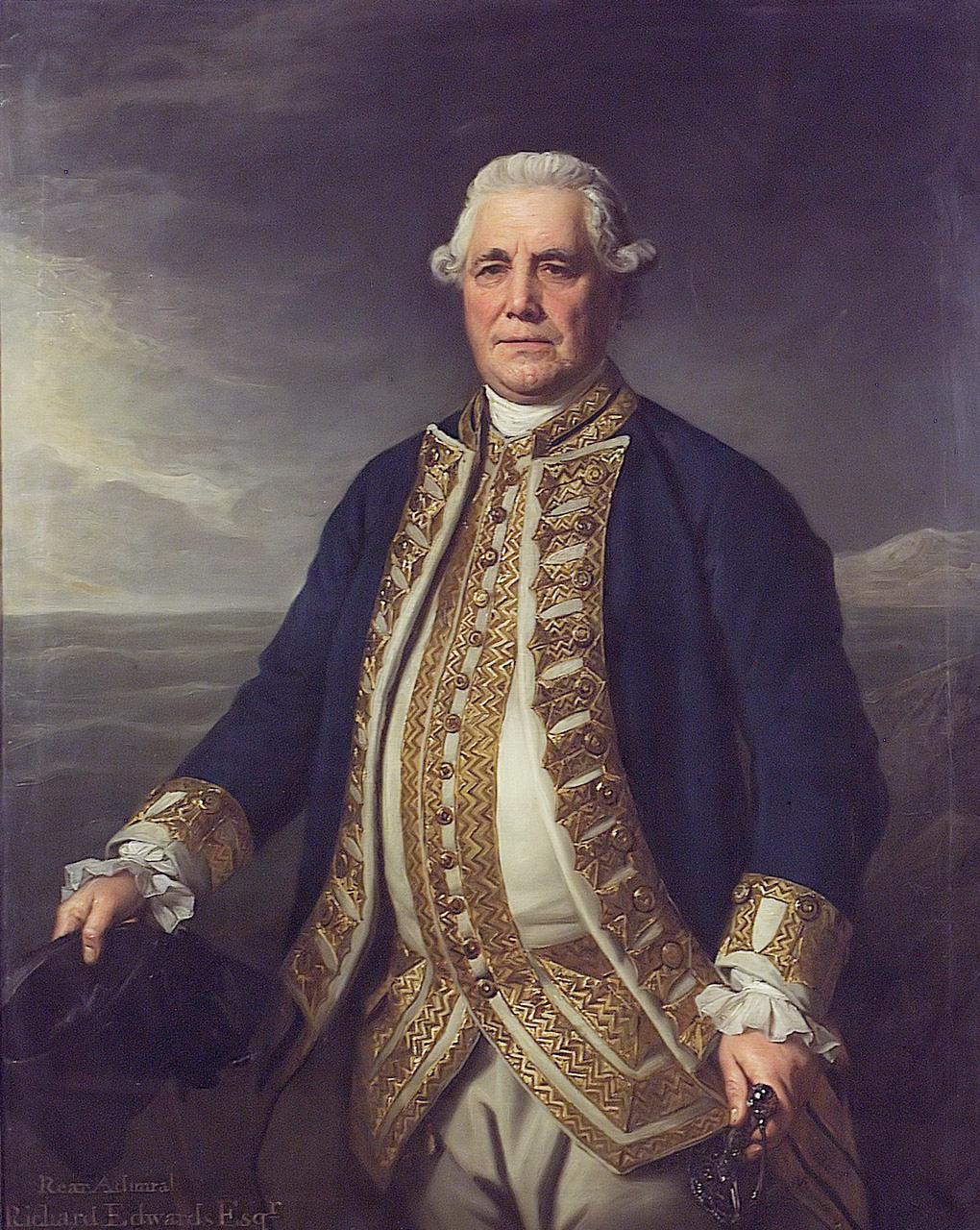
Richard Edwards served as the colonial governor of Newfoundland during much of the Revolution.

The population of St. John's Island (present-day Prince Edward Island), small compared to Nova Scotia, was only about 1215 in 1774. Nova Scotia has been described as a 'shield' to the other two colonies, stopping much unrest from the American colonies from reaching them. St. John's Island during the time has been described as "a model colony".

At the outbreak of the American Revolution, Phillips Callback was in charge of St. Johns Island. (Note: The governor was on a trip to England, and Callback, the Attorney General was left in charge.) Thomas Gage began recruiting men to help defend Quebec against American attack; however, his efforts were hindered by a group of American revolutionaries living in Pictou, Nova Scotia. A group of about 150 American soldiers set out to attack ships bringing arms to the British. Though they failed in their attempt, they arrived in Pictou. From the Americans living there, they learned about recruiting efforts and then attacked Charlottetown. They threatened to set fire to the town, but Callback convinced them to spare the town. Callback and Thomas Wright (the surveyor of the island) were taken prisoner. The two hostages were eventually released, and made it back to the island on May 1, 1776.

After the attack, an armed brig was sent to guard St. John's Island, and a militia was raised. The brig left when HMS Lizard arrived in September 1776. A fort was planned to defend the town better than Fort Amherst could. After Eddy's raid, the militia (which had only existed as 20 men previously) was raised to 80, and named The Loyal Island of St. John Volunteers. In 1778, five companies under Timothy Hierlihy were sent to better garrison the island. At the troops' arrival, Callback was ordered to disband the "superfluous and expensive" militia. He ignored the orders. The feasibility of attacking St. John's was considered by the French navy.

The island, despite perceived danger, served mainly as a stopping point for British troops on their way out from Quebec, and British troops bringing captured privateers back. A group of 200 Hessians en route to Quebec spent a year on the Island. Work on the fort continued until Patterson (the governor) arrived in 1780. He saw the five companies and 8,000 pounds which had been spent on fortifications as a colossal waste of money. Work was halted and the companies returned. Throughout the war, the island was highly loyal, and endured few attacks.

In 1765, Newfoundland's population was around 15,000, consisting largely of Irish immigrants. As it was not technically a colony, Newfoundland did not pay the Stamp Act 1765 or Townshend Acts taxes. Despite having minor problems with the British government, the island "preserved a tone of exemplary loyalty." The island maintained nearly no defences, and as such, Esek Hopkins was sent to attack Newfoundland. In September 1776, a group of several privateers took three or four ships, and plundered about ten others. In 1777, HMS Fox was captured, and several months later retaken. The following year many other ships were attacked, particularly by Minerva.

Upon the arrival of Richard Edwards, many privateers were defeated, and by 1779, very few were left. Edwards ordered cannon distributed to allow towns to defend themselves against attack. In early 1780, at Mortier, a privateer was repulsed by the town. That same year, a fleet, led by Edwards, of nine ships, captured six privateers. Fourteen were captured the next year. Several companies were raised, and several hundred soldiers left to fight with British troops.

Both islands had minor food shortages, particularly after a fire on St. Johns burned 35 houses and many stores of food. The fishing industries in both were reduced to "low and miserable state[s]," and the general population of both decreased as well. An outbreak of robberies occurred as people needed various resources. A riot occurred in 1779 on St. John's, in which one person was killed.

== Loyalist settlements ==
About 20,000 Loyalists fled to Nova Scotia during and after the American Revolution. Most came from the State of New York. The three largest settlements were Saint John River Valley Digby, Nova Scotia; and Shelburne, Nova Scotia. Cape Breton was a separate colony and received 3150 Loyalists. Ile St. Jean received 300 Loyalist refugees. The British returned New Ireland to the Americans and the territory in Maine entered the control of the newly independent American state of Massachusetts. Those from New Ireland settled St. Andrews, New Brunswick. With the Loyalist homeland gone, Nova Scotia was divided to accommodate the Loyalists, and both New Brunswick and Cape Breton were created as separate colonies for the Loyalists (Cape Breton returned to Nova Scotia in 1820).

There are many Loyalists who settled in Halifax and were buried in the Old Burying Ground (Halifax, Nova Scotia), including a number of Black Loyalists who have unmarked graves.

Numerous British soldiers became Loyalists and their regiments settled in various communities across Nova Scotia. The Royal Fencible American Regiment settled in Wallace, Nova Scotia. The Second Battalion of the 84th Regiment of Foot (Royal Highland Emigrants) settled in Municipality of East Hants, particularly at Kennetcook, Nova Scotia.

There were three Regiments that settled Digby, Nova Scotia: New Jersey Volunteers, the Royal Garrison Battalion and the Loyal American Regiment. Black Pioneers settled in Brindley Town, (now Acaciaville, Nova Scotia).

The Black Pioneers settled at Annapolis Royal, Nova Scotia. The Hessians also settled Annapolis Royal and other places in Nova Scotia.

At Guysborough, Nova Scotia there were six regiments that settled: Jamaica Rangers, Jamaica Volunteers, Negro Horse, Royal North Carolina Regiment, Duke of Cumberland's Regiment and the North Carolina Highlanders. East Country Harbour, Nova Scotia was settled by three regiments: the Royal North Carolina Regiment, the King's Carolina Rangers (see Joseph Marshall) and the South Carolina Royalists.

The Royal Nova Scotia Volunteer Regiment settled Ship Harbour, Nova Scotia and Antigonish, Nova Scotia.

The King's Orange Rangers settled in Middleton, Nova Scotia.

=== Communities named after Loyalist Leaders ===
- Parrsboro, Nova Scotia, John Parr
- Guysborough, Nova Scotia (Guy's borough), Guy Carleton, 1st Baron Dorchester)
- Carleton Corner
- Carleton Village, Nova Scotia
- Birchtown, Nova Scotia, Brigadier-General Samuel Birch, compiler of the Book of Negroes
- Rawdon, Nova Scotia, Francis Rawdon-Hastings
- Digby, Nova Scotia, Admiral Robert Digby (Royal Navy officer)
- Abercrombie, Nova Scotia, General James Abercrombie
- Tiddville, Nova Scotia, Samuel Tidd, a private for Col. Beverley Robinson
- Gilbert Cove, Nova Scotia, Lt. Thomas Gilbert
- Barton, Nova Scotia, Lt. Col. Joseph Barton (military officer)
- Russell Lake, Nova Scotia, Nathaniel Russell
- Wentworth, Nova Scotia, Sir John Wentworth, 1st Baronet
- Wentworth Valley, Nova Scotia
- Wentworth Station, Nova Scotia
- Douglas, Nova Scotia, Sir Charles Douglas, 1st Baronet
- Seccombes Island, Nova Scotia, Rev. John Seccombe
- Ballantynes Cove, Antigonish, (David Ballentine, 82nd Regiment)
- Balls Creek, Nova Scotia, (Ingram Ball, 33rd Regiment)

== See also ==
- Canadian and Nova Scotia Refugee Tract
- Military history of Nova Scotia
