= Raid on Chester, Nova Scotia =

Raid on Chester
- Part of the American Revolution
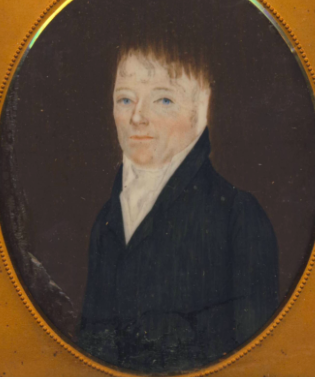
- Captain Jonathan Prescott
Date	June 30, 1782
Location	Chester, Nova Scotia
Result	British victory

Belligerents
Kingdom of Great Britain	United States of America

Commanders and leaders
Jonathan Prescott; Captain Jacob Millett	Noah Stoddard; George Wait Babcock; Herbert Woodbury

Strength
Unknown	5 vessels 170 crew members

Casualties and losses
No casualties	1 dead

The Raid on Chester occurred during the American Revolution when the US privateer, Captain Noah Stoddard of Fairhaven, Massachusetts, and four other privateer vessels attacked the British settlement at Chester, Nova Scotia on 30 June 1782. The town was defended by Captain Jonathan Prescott.

== Background ==
During the American Revolution, Nova Scotia was invaded regularly by American Revolutionary forces by land and sea. Throughout the war, American privateers devastated the maritime economy by raiding many of the coastal communities. There were constant attacks by privateers, which began seven years earlier with the raid on St. John and included raids on all the major outposts in Nova Scotia. The first raid on Chester occurred in 1779 and the second three years later.

== Raid on Chester ==
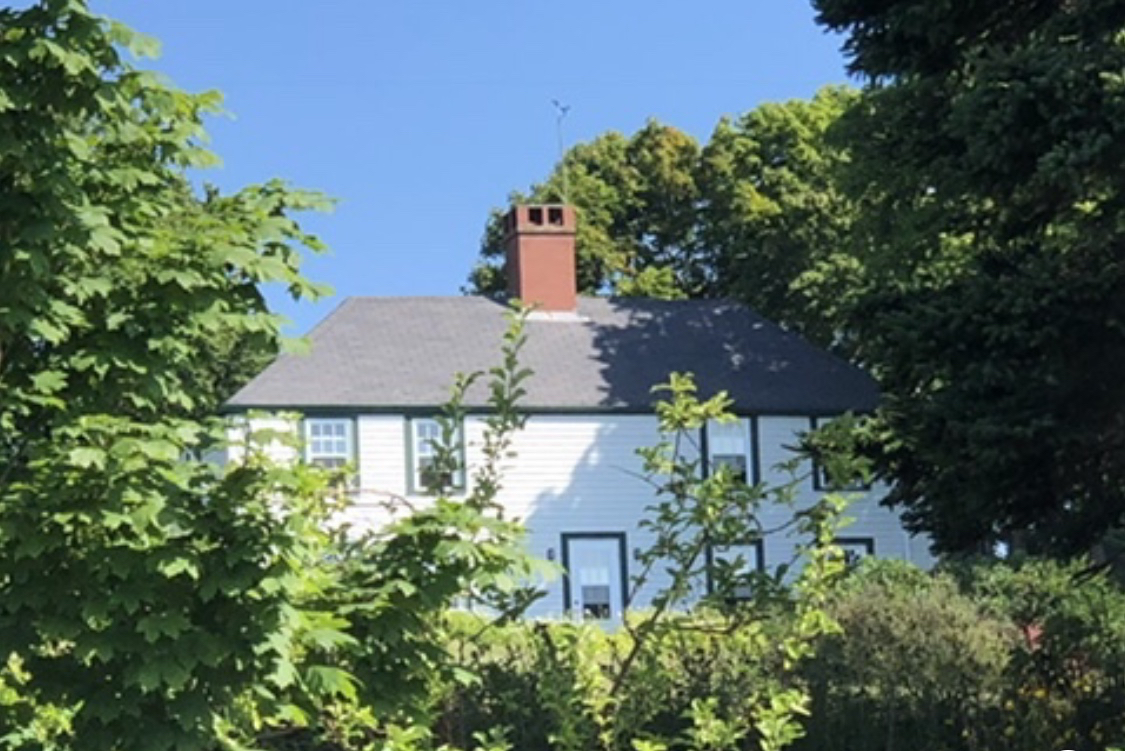
Chester Blockhouse (present-day Wisteria Cottage House), Chester, Nova Scotia

On June 30, the day before the raid on Lunenburg, Stoddard and two other privateers descended on Chester, Nova Scotia firing cannon from their vessels. Captain of the militia Jonathan Prescott fired cannon from the blockhouse. (The cannon Prescott used are now located on the grounds of the Chester Legion.) Prescott's cannon fire struck one of the privateers. As a result, the privateers retreated behind Nass' Point. The crews went ashore and requested of Prescott to bury their dead. Prescott indicated that if they disarmed themselves, they would be assisted. Eventually, Prescott invited Stoddard and the two other captains to tea. Realizing the community was still vulnerable to attack, Prescott and his son lied to the privateers that Commander Creighton at Lunenburg had sent 100 soldiers to be billeted at Chester that evening. Upon the privateers' retreat to their vessels, Captain Jacob Millett led women and children marching in red colours, pretending to be British soldiers from Lunenburg. The privateers left Chester to raid Lunenburg the following day.

== Aftermath ==
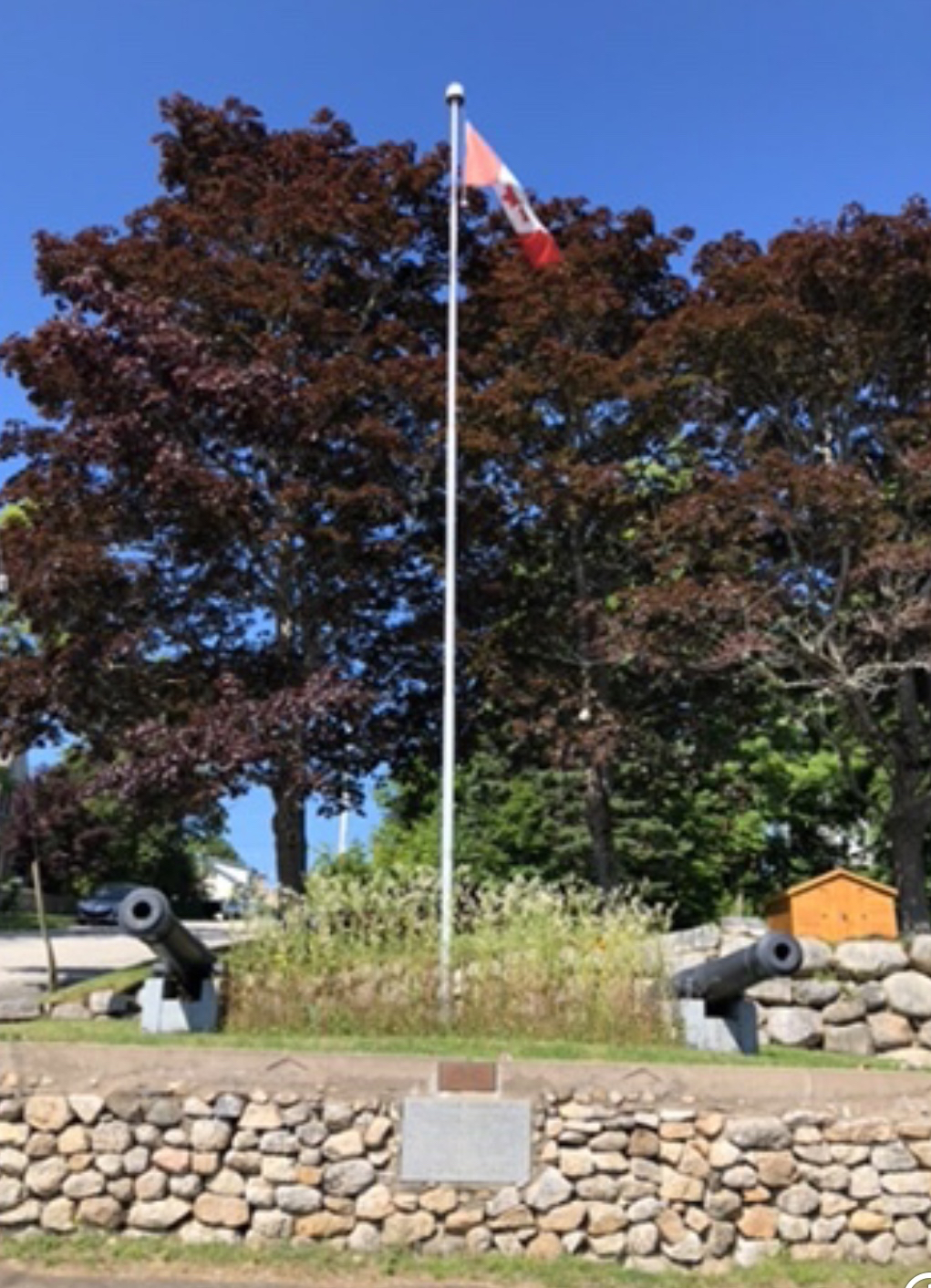
Chester Blockhouse Cannons, Chester Legion, Chester, Nova Scotia

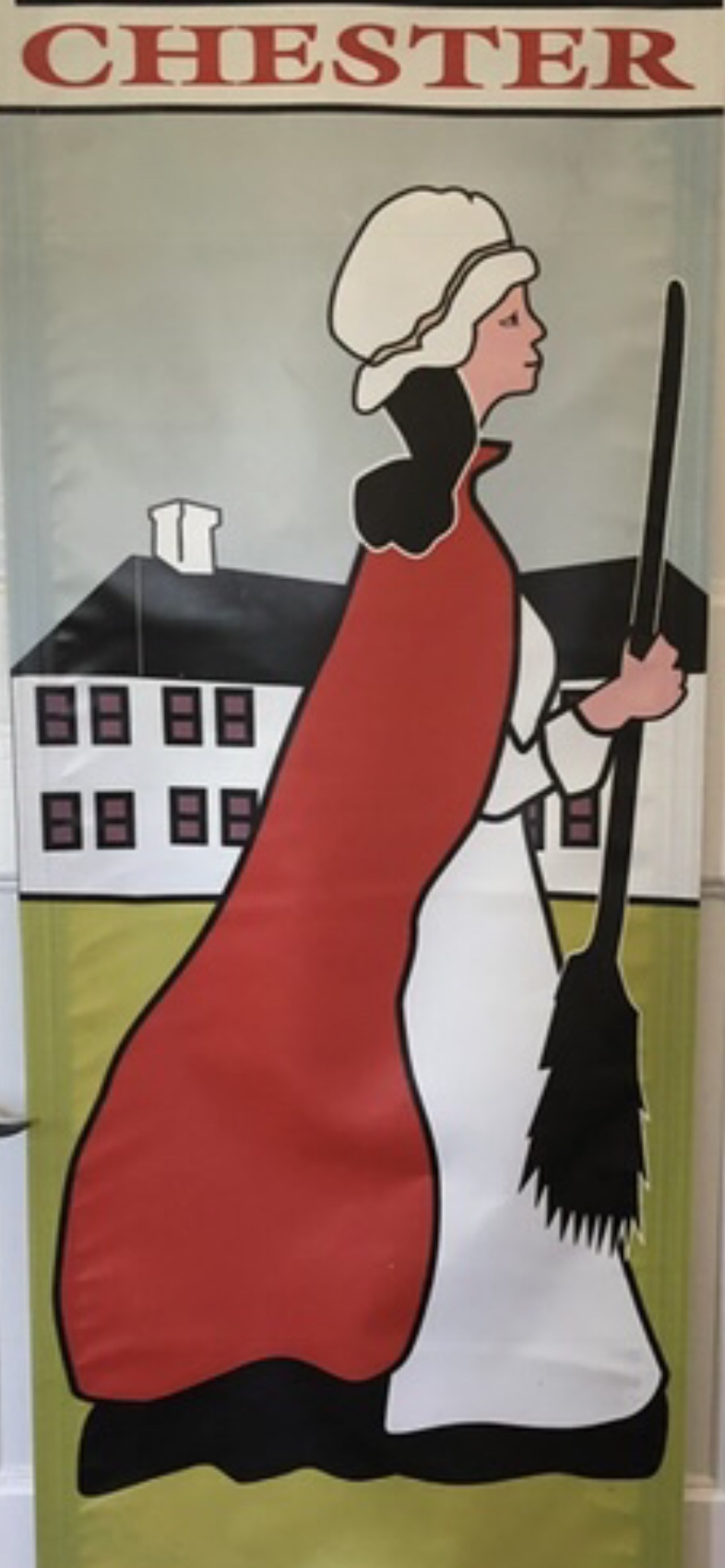
Raid on Chester, Street Banner, Chester, Nova Scotia

The day after the raid on Chester, the American privateers redirected their attack on Lunenburg, presumably believing the Lunenburg militia had left the town to defend Chester.

Jonathan Prescott was suspected of being an American Patriot sympathizer given that, after the initial hostile engagement, he reportedly allowed Captain Noah Stoddard to bury his dead and then had tea with him the day before Stoddard orchestrated the raid on Lunenburg. People were also suspicious of Prescott's allegiance, because a number of Dr. Prescott's family were Patriots in the American Revolution; his nephew Samuel had ridden with Paul Revere. Samuel eventually was taken prisoner to Halifax where he is reported to have died during the war. Jonathan named one of his sons after Samuel and he is buried at the Old Burying Ground in Halifax. Jonathan's son Joseph joined the Continental Army, fought at Fort Ticonderoga, and was a founding member of the Society of the Cincinnati. Another of Dr. Prescott's sons John fought in the Battle of Lexington. His other son was Charles Ramage Prescott.

After the war, Jonathan Prescott was given the blockhouse, the modern-day Wisteria Cottage House, and used it as his home.

== See also ==
- American Revolution - Nova Scotia theatre
- Colonial American military history
- Military history of Nova Scotia

== Bibliography ==
- Allen, Gardner W. (1913). A Naval History of the American Revolution. Vol. II. Boston: Houghton Mifflin.
- DesBrisay, Mather Byles (1895). History of the County of Lunenburg. Toronto: William Briggs.
- Eastman, Ralph M. (1928). "Captain Noah Stoddard". Some Famous Privateers of New England. Boston: State Street Trust. pp. 61–63.
- Gwyn, Julian (2003). Frigates and Foremasts: The North American Squadron in Nova Scotia Waters, 1745–1815, University of British Columbia Press. ISBN 0774809116.
- MacMechan, Archibald (1923), "The Sack of Lunenburg" in Sagas of the Sea. The Temple Press, pp. 57–72.
- Prescott, William (1870). The Prescott Memorial: or a Genealogical Memoir of the Prescott Families in America. Boston: Henry W. Dutton & Son.
- A History of American Privateers
- Massachusetts Privateers, p. 176
- Agnes Creighton, "An Unforeclosed Mortgage," Acadiensis, October, 1905

Primary documents

- The Boston Gazette, and the Country Journal, Monday, July 15, 1782.
- The Massachusetts Spy: Or, American Oracle of Liberty [Worcester], Thursday, July 25, 1782.
- The Continental Journal, Boston, Thursday, July 18, 1782.
- Joseph Pernette to Franklin, letter, dated at LaHave, July 3, 1782, reprinted in DesBrisay, Mather Byles, History of the County of Lunenburg, Toronto: Wesley Briggs, 1895, pp. 65–67.
- Leonard Rudolf's account in Invasion of Lunenburg in Acadie and the Acadians
