= Battle off Halifax =

Battle off Halifax may refer to:

- Battle off Halifax (1780)
- Battle off Halifax (1782)
