= Jonathan Prescott =

British military officer

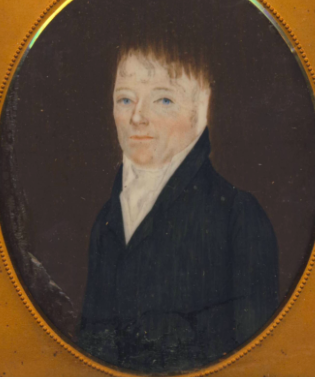
Jonathan Prescott (c. 1760) by French prisoner, Chester, Nova Scotia

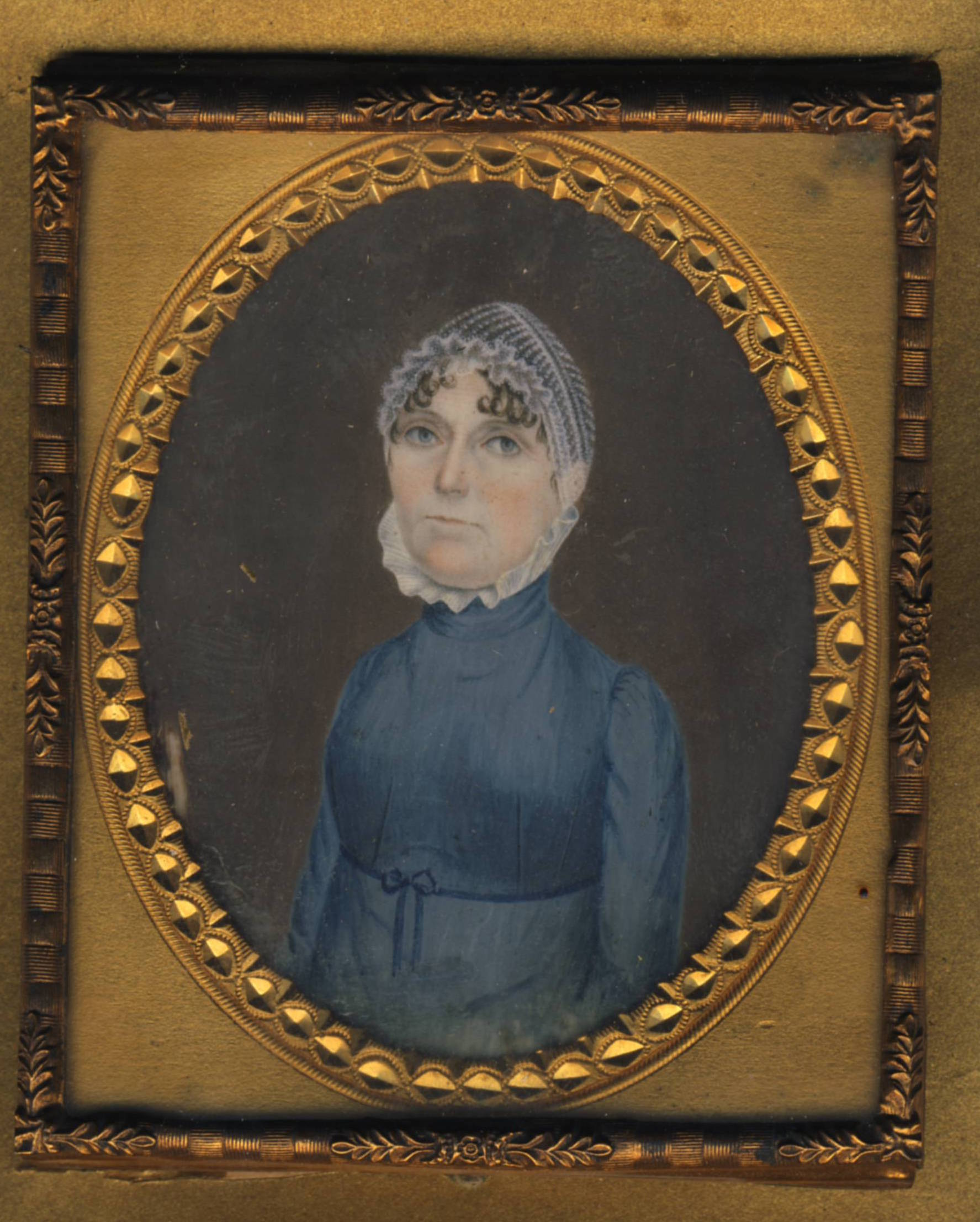
Wife of Jonathan Prescott, Ann Prescott (c. 1760) by French prisoner, Chester, Nova Scotia

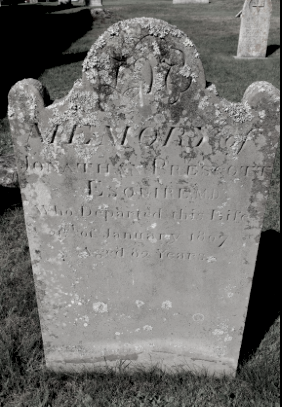
Dr. Jonathan Prescott, St. Stephen's Cemetery, Chester, Nova Scotia

Dr. Jonathan Prescott (24 May 1725 - 11 Jan 1807) was a British officer who fought at the Siege of Louisbourg (1745), became the Captain of the militia at Chester, Nova Scotia and later was involved with the Raid on Chester, Nova Scotia (1782). He was the father of Charles Ramage Prescott.

== Life ==
Prescott was born on 24 May 1725 at Littleton, Massachusetts. He was a surgeon and Captain of the engineers in the Siege of Louisbourg (1745). He led a company of men in Colonel Samuel Moore's regiment from New Hampshire. After the Siege, he returned to Boston only to return to Halifax in 1751 where he established a rum distillery. He also operating a fleet of fishing boats and operated a lumber mill in Chester and developed a lime quarry. He was one of the original grantees of the Shoreham Grant, which would become Chester. He became the Justice of the Peace. Jonathan and his wife Ann built a large house in Chester, Lunenburg County Nova Scotia called "Maroon Hall". French prisoners of war were housed at this house and painted portraits of Jonathan and Ann (c. 1760). During the French and Indian War, he reported the Mi'kmaq burned his house and mill twice and, for the protection of his family, he spent much of his time during these years in Halifax.

During the American Revolution, Prescott defended the village of Chester from an attack by American Privateers, firing cannon from the blockhouse (The cannons are now located on the grounds of the Chester Legion.) Prescott was suspected of being an American Patriot sympathizer given that, after the initial hostile engagement, Prescott reportedly allowed Captain Noah Stoddard to bury his dead and then had tea with him the day before Stoddard orchestrated the Raid on Lunenburg (1782).

After the war, Prescott was given the blockhouse (now the Wisteria Cottage House) and used it as his home. Prescott died at 11 Jan 1807 Chester, Lunenburg County, Nova Scotia, Canada.

== Family ==
A number of Dr. Prescott's family were Patriots in the American Revolution. His nephew Samuel rode with Paul Revere. Samuel eventually was taken prisoner to Halifax, where he is reported to have died during the war. Jonathan named one of his sons after his nephew Samuel and he is buried in Old Burying Ground (Halifax, Nova Scotia). Jonathan's son Joseph joined the Continental Army, fought at Fort Ticonderoga and was a founding member of the Society of the Cincinnati. Another of Dr. Prescott's sons John fought in the Battle of Lexington. His other son was Charles Ramage Prescott.

== See also ==
- Nova Scotia in the American Revolution
