= William Williams (naval officer) =

Captain William Williams (died 22 October 1780) was an American naval officer in the American Revolution. He was imprisoned twice by the British and participated in the Battle off Halifax (1780).

== Career ==
He commanded a privateer from Providence, Rhode Island named Montgomery. On 8 August 1777 he was captured by the British and committed to Fortun Prison. Williams escaped and then took command of the privateer Gerard on 23 March 1779. He then commanded the privateer Nantz. He fell in with HMS Shaftsbury in July 1779 and was taken prisoner again. He was exchanged the following year and, on 9 May 1780, Williams took command of the privateer Viper (16 guns).

On 10 July 1780 Williams was victorious over the British privateer Resolution in the Battle off Halifax (1780).

On 30 October 1780 Williams fell in with the British privateer Hetty (16 guns) off Cape Hatteras, North Carolina. Williams delivered a broadside about noon. The battle lasted 30 minutes when Williams was severely wounded by a musket ball and the Hetty escaped. Williams died six hours later.

== See also ==
- Nova Scotia in the American Revolution
