= David Ropes =

American privateer

- Born: c. 1755; Salem, Massachusetts
- Died: 29 May 1782 (aged c. 27); Atlantic Ocean
- Children: 1 son
- Military career
- Allegiance: United States
- Service years: 1778–1782
- Conflicts: American Revolutionary War 2nd Battle off Halifax †

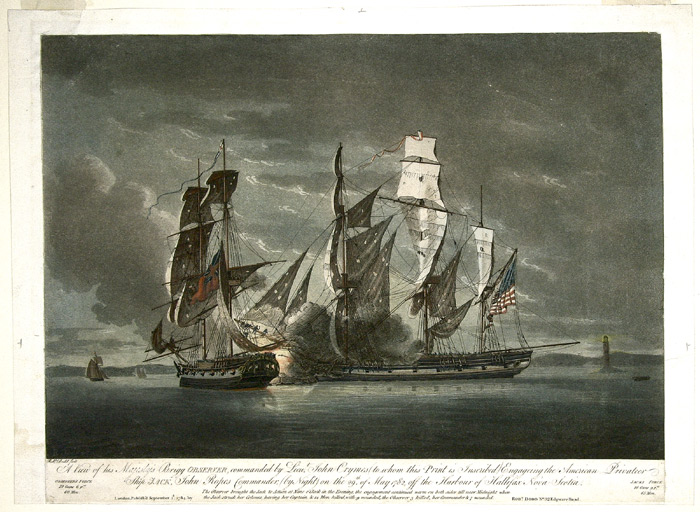
Death of David Ropes, Battle off Halifax (1782) by Robert Dodd

Captain David Ropes (c. 1755 – May 1782) was an American privateer from Salem, Massachusetts who served in the American Revolutionary War. He was taken prisoner twice during the war and then killed in the Battle off Halifax (1782).

== Career ==
On 14 August 1778, Ropes became the commander of the schooner Lively (14 guns, 40 men). He was captured off Jeddore, Nova Scotia by the armed sloops Howe on 10 November 1778.

Six months later on 22 May 1779, he became the commander of the Brigantine Wildcat (12 guns, 65 men). On 14 June, he chased a brig and drove it ashore. In August 1779, the Wild Cat was taken by Robuste (64 guns), and Ropes was brought to Newfoundland and imprisoned.

The following year, on 9 September 1780, Ropes became the commander of the schooner Dolphin (8 guns, 20 men).

On 14 March 1781, Ropes became the commander of the ship Congress (20 guns, 130 men). On 1 July 1781, Ropes was taken prisoner along with 20 men in a battle with the British frigate HMS Oiseau under the command of Captain Henry Lloyd, and carried into St. John's, Newfoundland. Ropes was released and arrive in Boston on 15 August.

On 16 September 1781, Ropes became commander of the ship Jack (14 guns, 60 men). He fell in with the British brigantine Observer (12 guns, 173 men) off of Halifax, Nova Scotia on May 29, 1782. The British had killed Ropes by the first broadside and then half the crew before Lieutenant William Gray surrendered the ship.

His son was Captain Joseph Ropes.

== See also ==
- Nova Scotia in the American Revolution
