= Battle off Halifax (1780) =

1782 battle

Coordinates: 44.436°N 63.562°W

- Part of the American Revolutionary War
Date	10 July 1780
Location	Halifax, Nova Scotia
Result	American victory

Belligerents
United States	Great Britain

Commanders and leaders
(United States) William Williams	(Kingdom of Great Britain) Thomas Ross

Strength
1 Privateer (16 guns); British report: 130 men American report: 90 men	1 Brig unknown

Casualties and losses
British report: 33 killed and wounded American report: 1 killed, 2 wounded	8 killed; 10 wounded 1 Brig captured

The Battle off Halifax took place on 10 July 1780 during the American Revolutionary War. The British privateer Resolution fought the American privateer Viper and heavy casualties were suffered by both sides. The battle was "one of the bloodiest battles in the history of privateering.... a loss of 51 lives in a single battle was virtually unheard of."

== Background ==
During the American Revolution, Americans regularly attacked Nova Scotia by land and sea. American privateers devastated the maritime economy by raiding many of the coastal communities, such as the numerous raids on Liverpool and on Annapolis Royal. A few months before the Battle of Halifax, in December 1779 the schooner Hope wrecked near the Sambro Island Light on the Three Sisters Rocks. Captain Henry Baldwin and six other crew were killed. Weeks later, 170 British sailors were lost when two vessels - North and St Helena - were wrecked in a storm when entering Halifax harbour.

== Battle ==
Just off Sambro Island Light, the American privateer Viper (22 guns, 130 men), under the command of William Williams took the British brig Resolution (16 guns) under the command of Captain Thomas Ross of Halifax. In the "hot engagement" for 90 minutes, the British had killed 8 and 10 wounded, while the American killed and wounded totalled 33 men. Both vessels were much disabled and the British surrendered.

== Aftermath ==
American privateers remained a threat to Nova Scotian ports for the rest of the war. For example, after a failed attempt to raid Chester, Nova Scotia, American privateers struck again in the Raid on Lunenburg in 1782.

== See also ==
- American Revolution - Nova Scotia theatre
- Military history of Nova Scotia
