= Gravenstein =

Apple cultivar

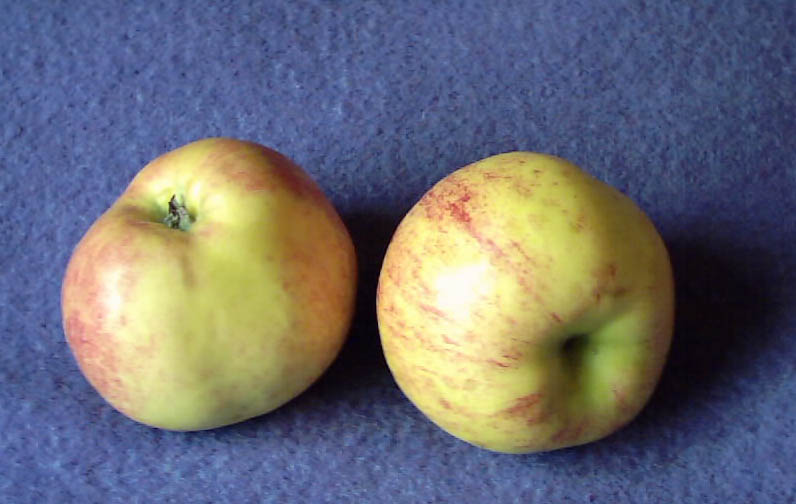
- Origin: Unknown, possibly Germany or Italy. Arrived in Denmark, 1669.

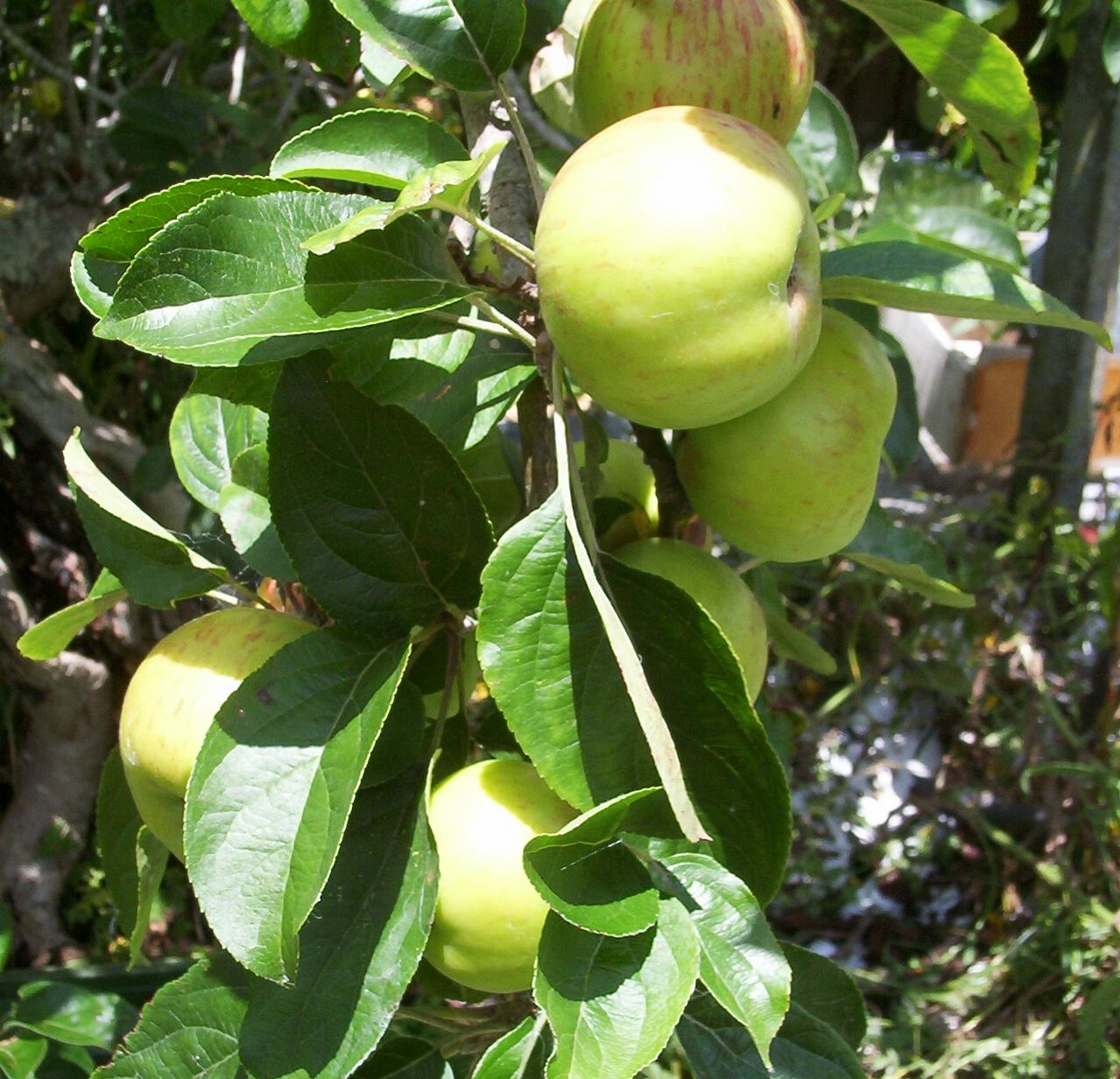
Detail of fruit and leaves

Gravenstein (Danish: Gråsten, meaning "graystone", after Gråsten Palace) is a triploid apple cultivar that originated in the 17th century or earlier. The fruit has a tart flavor, and it is heavily used as a cooking apple, especially for apple sauce and apple cider. It does not keep well, and it is available only in season. This is in part because neither cold storage, nor regular controlled atmosphere keeps the apples' distinctive aroma, although the Nova Scotia Fruit Growers' Association states that "recently however, low oxygen CA storage has shown promise in retaining this harvest-time quality".

== Description and growing conditions ==
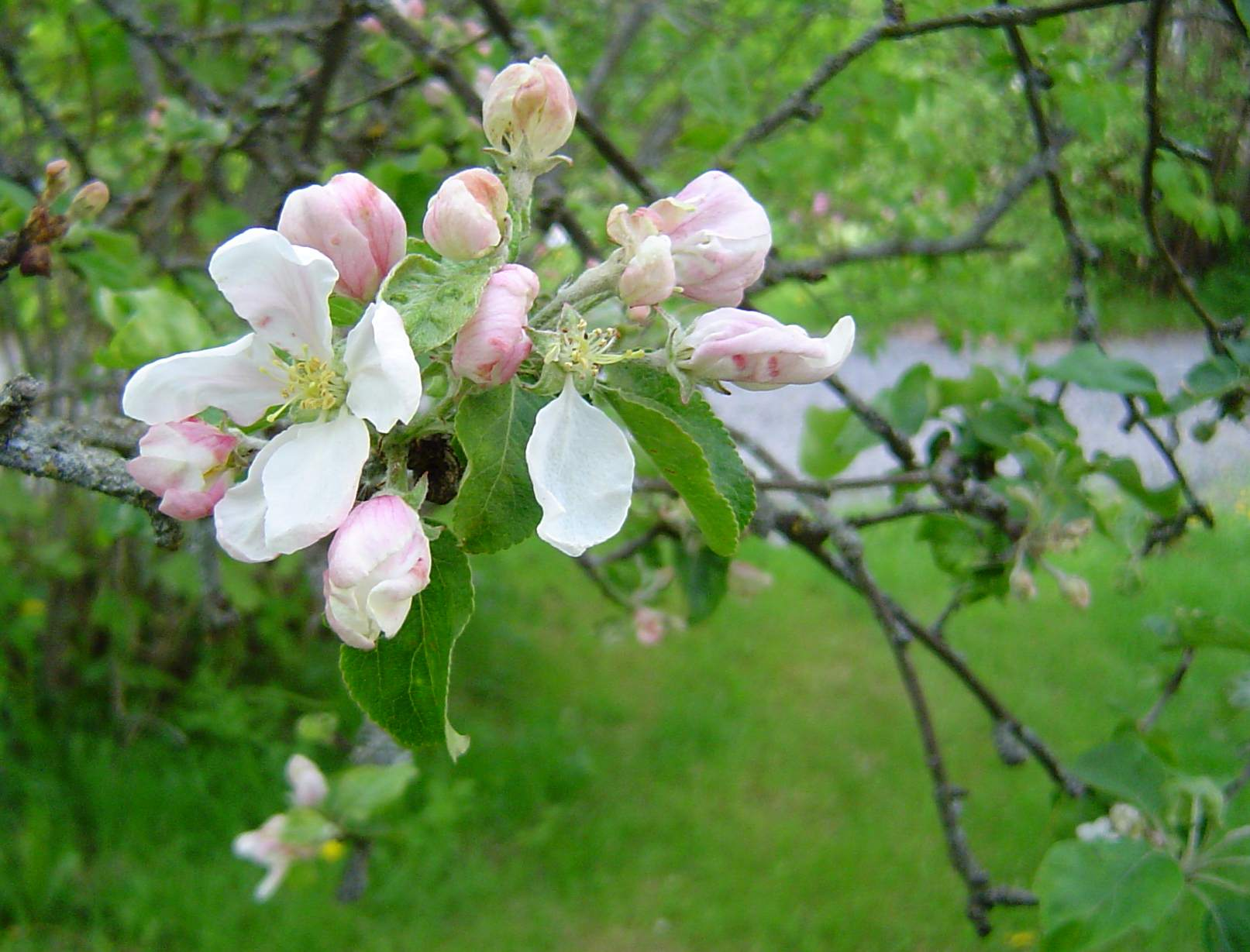
Gravenstein flowers in Norway

The Gravenstein plant is a triploid; it requires pollination from other trees, and is a poor pollinator of other apples. The short stems and variable ripening times make harvesting and selling difficult.

The skin of the fruit is a delicately waxy yellow-green with crimson spots and reddish lines, but the apple may also occur in a classically red variation. These red apples, known as Red Gravensteins, are sports, which are genetically similar to Gravenstein, so they are not good pollinators for it, and nor is it for them. The flesh is juicy, finely grained, and light yellow.

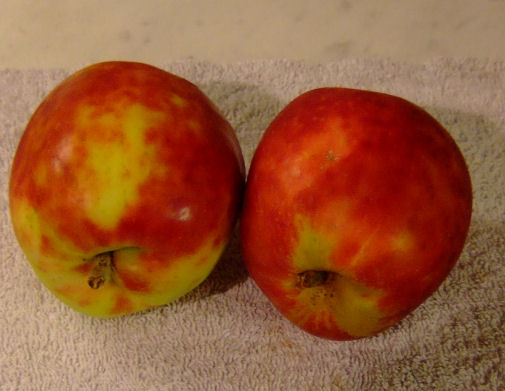
Red Gravenstein

Gravenstein trees are among the largest of standard-root apples, with a strong branching structure; the wood is brownish-red and the leaves are large, shiny, and dark green. It grows best in moderate, damp, loamy soil with minimal soil drying during the summer months. Locations close to watercourses and edges of ponds are preferred. Gravensteins will not thrive in areas of high groundwater and require moderate protection against wind.

- S genotype S4 S11 S20
- Vitamin C 8 mg / 100 gram.
- Density 0.82 g/cc

== Areas of production ==
In Austria, Gravensteins are used for the production of high-quality brandy (Obstler) that is particularly popular in the southern Steiermark.

In Australia, they are available for a few weeks early in the apple season—late January and early February—from the Blue Mountains region west of Sydney.

In Denmark, Gravensteiner is picked in the second half of September. Danish Food Minister Hans Christian Schmidt proclaimed the Gravenstein to be the "national apple" on 18 September 2005, although its market share has since decreased in relation to imported apples.

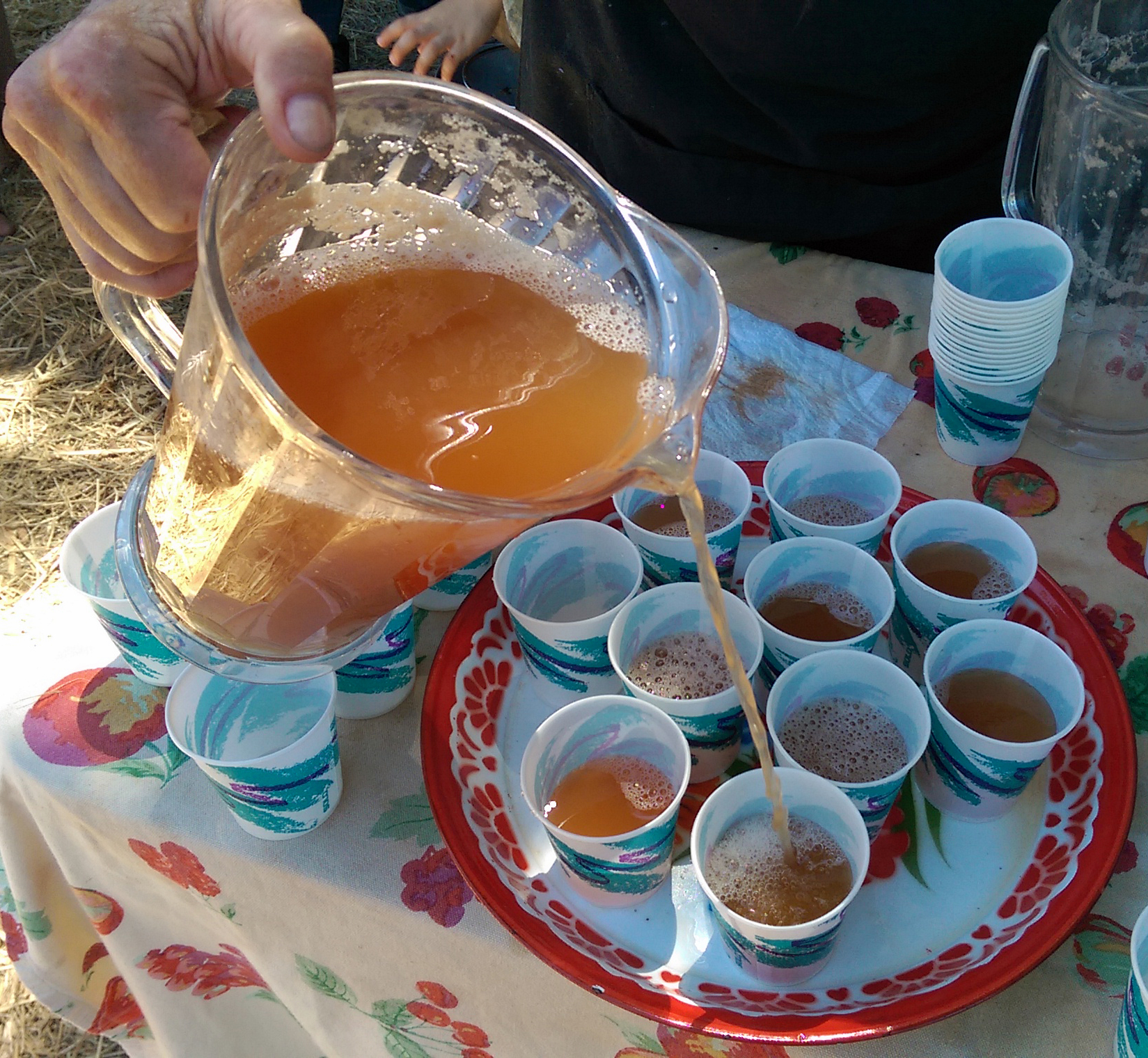
Cider made from Gravenstein apples

In the United States, Gravensteins are found most widely on the west coast, and in particular, around the Sonoma County, California, town of Sebastopol. Luther Burbank praised the apple, "It has often been said that if the Gravenstein could be had throughout the year, no other apple need be grown."

In Canada it is widely grown on both coasts, although more in old farmstead orchards and back yards than in commercial orchards.

During the first half of the 20th century, Gravenstein was the major apples cultivar grown in western Sonoma County, California, and was the source for apple sauce and dried apples for the U.S. troops in World War II. Most of the orchards in Sonoma County are now gone due to a combination of a shift to wine production, and economic changes in the apple industry. Only six commercial growers and one commercial processor remained in Sonoma County as of 2006. In 2005, Slow Food USA declared the Gravenstein apple a heritage food and included it in their Ark of Taste. Slow Food USA reports that production in Sonoma County is currently 750,000 boxes (15,000 tons) of Gravenstein apples a year; a third of the fruit (250,000 boxes) is of premium market quality. California State Route 116 through portions of western Sonoma County is designated "Gravenstein Highway" to commemorate the industry.

Gravenstein is not a production apple in New Zealand and is not available in grocery stores anywhere in the country. There are a few trees here and there, though, and on occasion a small fruit grower or farmer's market will either have them for sale or allow a u-pick. On the North Island of New Zealand, they are ready for picking around the last week of February to the first week of March. In Nelson in the northern region of the South Island, Gravenstein apples may be picked as early as mid-January as a cooking apple. In New Zealand, two red sports were selected from the more stripey "common" Gravenstein: Albany Beauty and Oratia.

In Norway, Gravensteins are grown particularly in the regions of Telemark and Hardanger. In Hardanger, a memorial has been erected for Johannes Pedersen Aga who planted the first Gravenstein tree in Norway in 1792. Sogndal Municipality, home to numerous orchards, named one of the streets in Sogndalsfjøra Gravenstein Street.

== History ==
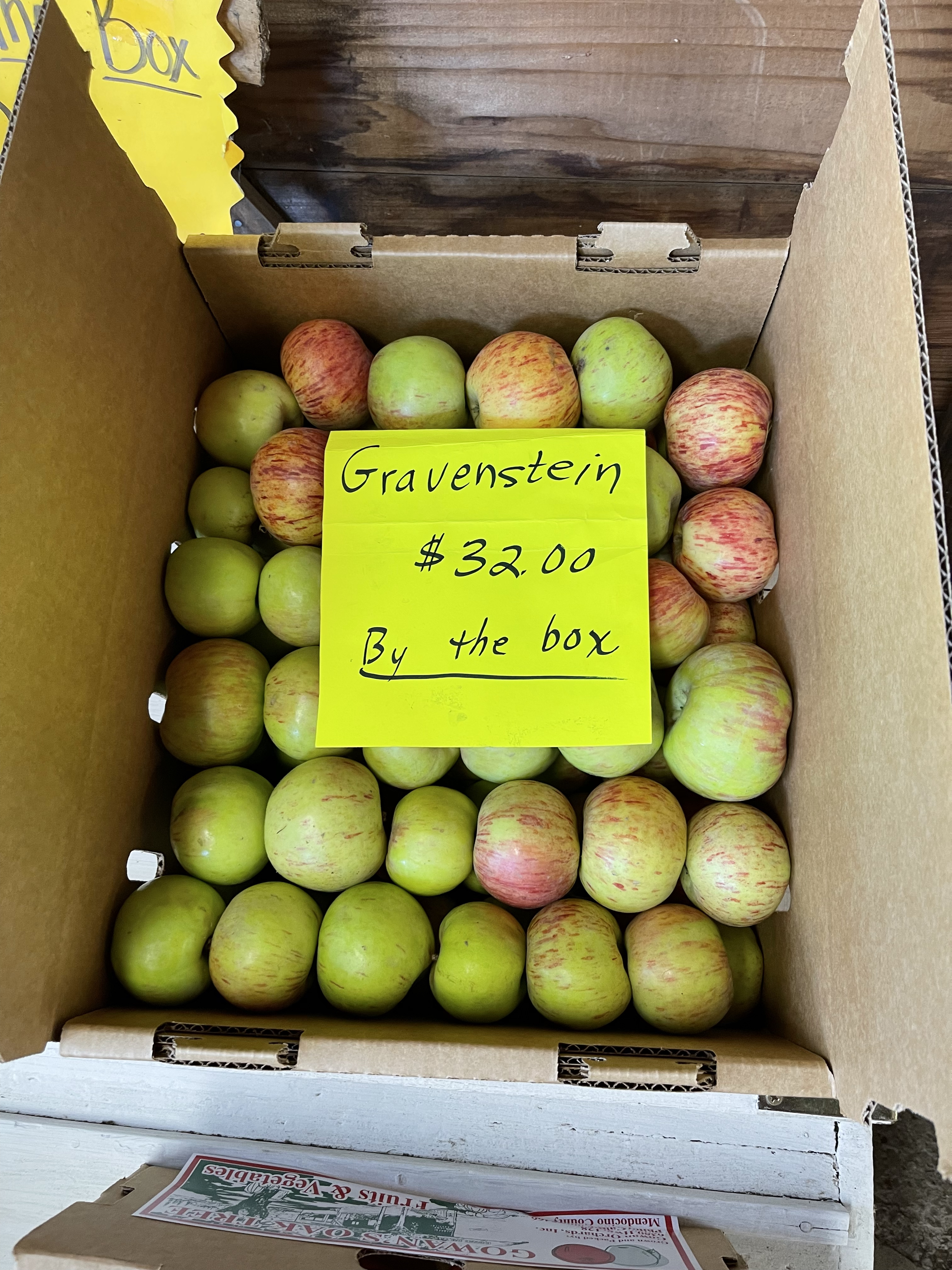
Estate grown Gravenstein for sale at Gowan's Oak Tree Fruit Stand in Philo, California.

According to a common version of events, Gravenstein was brought to Denmark by count Carl Ahlstedt, who found it at the monastery L'Abbaye de Hautcombe near Lac du Bourget in Savoyen. He sent branches home to his brother, count Frederik the Younger (1662-1708), who grafted them onto an apple tree in the garden of the family's Gråsten Palace. The apple cultivar was named "Gråsten" or "Gravenstein" (German variant of the "Gråsten"). One source claims it was Fredrik himself who brought the cultivar to Gråsten Palace.

The Gravenstein apple was introduced to western North America in the early 19th century, perhaps by Russian fur traders, who are said to have planted a tree at Fort Ross in 1811. The Gravenstein apple was introduced to the Canadian province of Nova Scotia in the 19th century. Charles Ramage Prescott, the father of the Nova Scotian apple industry, grew Nova Scotia's first Gravenstein trees in his orchard at Acacia Grove. By 1859, Gravenstein trees were commonly cultivated on Nova Scotian farms. The Gravenstein apple is still considered the choicest apple by many Nova Scotians, and the local type is listed on the Ark of Taste.

== See also ==
- Pearmain
