= HMS Trepassey (1779) =

Brig-sloop of the Royal Navy

History

Massachusetts
- Name: Wild Cat, or Wildcat
- Owner: John Fisk et al. of Salem, Massachusetts
- Launched: c.22 May 1779
- Commissioned: 22 May 1779
- Fate: Captured 14 July 1779

Great Britain
- Name: HMS Trepassey
- Acquired: 1779 by purchase post capture

Massachusetts
- Name: Defense
- Acquired: By purchase post capture on 17 May 1781
- Fate: Captured 3 November 1782

Great Britain
- Name: HMS Trepassey
- Acquired: 1782 by capture
- Fate: Sold 1784

General characteristics
- Tons burthen: 34156/94 (bm)
- Length: 95 ft 4 in (29.1 m) (deck)
- Beam: 26 ft 0 in (7.9 m)
- Depth of hold: 26 ft 0 in (7.9 m)
- Sail plan: Brig
- Complement: Wild Cat:66-75; HMS:80
- Armament: Wild Cat: 12 or 14 × 6-pounder guns; HMS:14 × 6-pounder guns

HMS Trepassey, often spelled "Trepassy", was a 14-gun brig-sloop of the Royal Navy, formerly the American privateer Wildcat, launched and captured in 1779. The Royal Navy purchased her in 1779. USS Alliance captured Trepassey in 1781. She became the American merchant vessel Defence. In 1782 HMS Jason captured Defense, which the Royal Navy took back into service under her earlier name. The Navy sold her in 1784.

== Wild Cat ==
Wild Cat sailed under the command of David Ropes. She captured two British vessels in June or July: the 120-ton (bm) brigantine Mercury, Jonathan Lovgrove, master, and the 160-ton (bm) ship Ocean, Christopher Dunon, master.

On 14 July 1779, Wildcat encountered and gave chase to the schooner HMS Egmont. Egmont, under the command of Lieutenant John Gardiner, attempted to escape from Wildcat but was forced to strike after having lost two men killed, one of them by the boarding party from Wildcat.

On 16 July, HMS Surprise was able to capture Wildcat. Surprise was able to free Lieutenant Gardiner and 20 of his men from Egmont who were aboard Wildcat, but the schooner herself had separated during the chase that preceded Wildcat's capture. The Royal Navy took Wildcat into service as Trepassey.

== HMS Trepassey ==
On 6 August 1779 Henry Edwyn Stanhope was promoted to Master and Commander of Trepassey at Newfoundland. He left during the autumn of 1780 and his successor was James Smyth, who took command in September.

On 27 May 1781 Captain John Barry commanding USS Alliance captured her in an engagement in which Smyth and four others were killed and nine men were wounded before she struck.

Barry repaired Trepassey, disarmed her, and sent her as a cartel to Halifax under the direction of her master, Phillip Windsor. After she had delivered the prisoners on board she returned to Boston, Massachusetts.

== Defense ==
HMS Jason recaptured Defence on 3 November 1792. Defence was libelled on 11 November. His Majesty's Naval Storekeeper claimed her as the Trepassey, sloop of war. The Vice admiralty court in Halifax, Nova Scotia, awarded the cargo, which had been proven American property, to the captors, and also one-eight of the value of Defence.

== HMS Trepassey ==
Commander Francis Cole commissioned Trepassey in September 1782. On 8 February 1784 she arrived at Plymouth, and then on 1 March she arrived at Deptford where she was paid off.

== Fate ==
The Navy sold Trepassey on 29 April 1784 for £735.
