= Charles Ramage Prescott =

Canadian politician

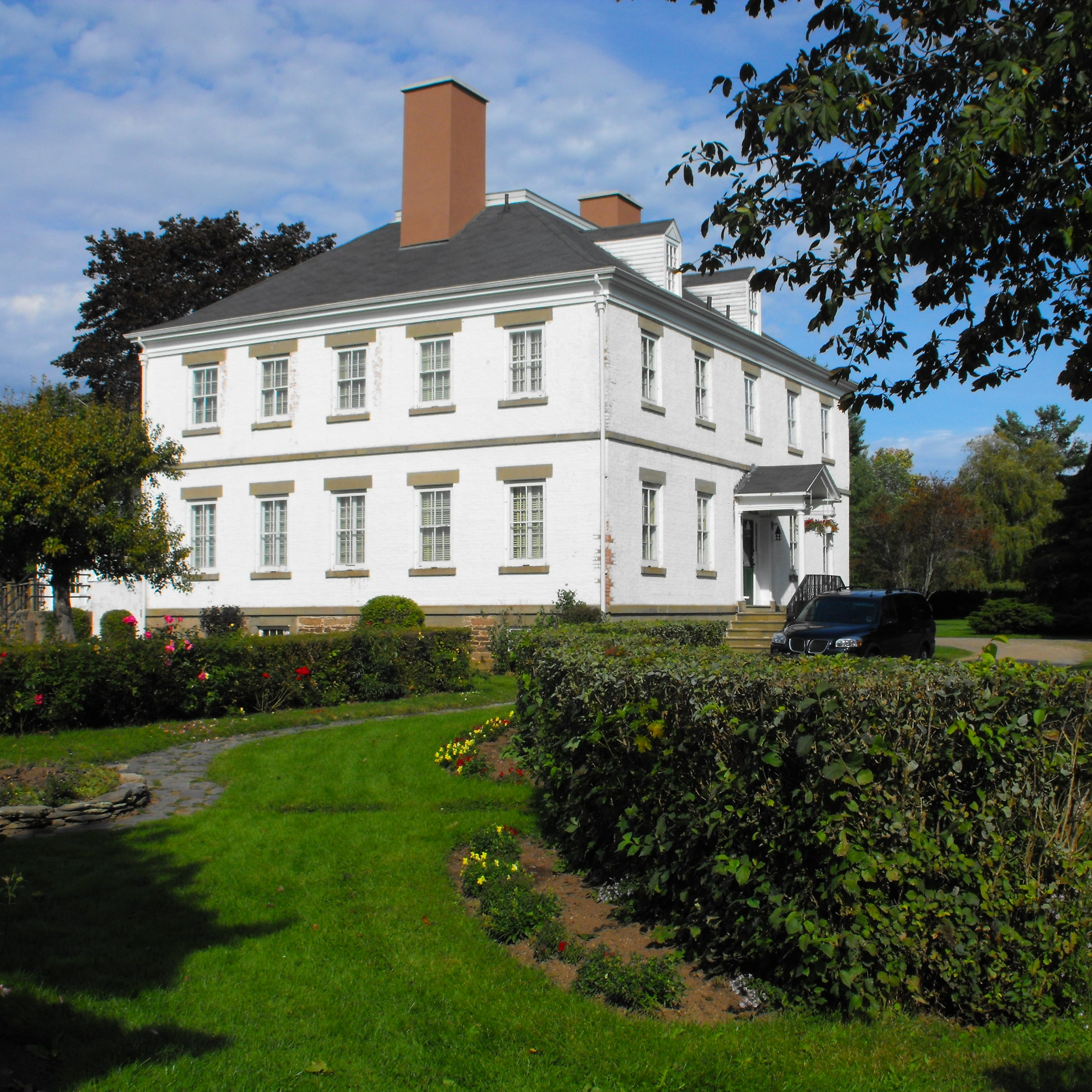
Prescott's Georgian manor at Starr's Point is now a museum. It was built between 1799 and 1809.

Charles Ramage Prescott (January 6, 1772 – June 11, 1859) was a merchant, horticulturalist and political figure in Nova Scotia. He represented the town of Cornwallis in the Nova Scotia House of Assembly from 1818 to 1820.

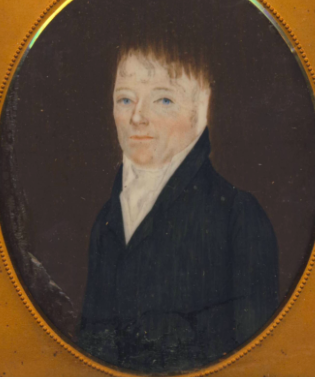
Charles Prescott's father Jonathan (1725-1807), Chester, Nova Scotia

He was born in Halifax, the son of Jonathan Prescott and Anne Blagden. He entered business in partnership with William Lawson. Prescott married Hannah Whidden in 1796. Prescott prospered during the Napoleonic Wars through ownership of ships supplying the British military and by shrewd trade. He retired from business in 1811 selling his wharves and warehouse complex on the Halifax waterfront to Enos Collins. The following year, he settled on a country estate called Acacia Grove in Starr's Point near Port Williams in Nova Scotia's Annapolis Valley. In 1814, he married Mariah Hammill after the death of his first wife. He was interested in the development of fruit trees, owning extensive orchards, importing fruit trees from Britain, Lower Canada and the United States and raising more exotic fruit in hothouses. Prescott, who often shared his stock with other growers, is credited with introducing many of the apple varieties commonly grown commercially in the province in the years that followed, including the Gravenstein, which became a provincial favourite. He was president of the King's County Horticultural Society and vice-president of the Nova Scotia Horticultural Society. In 1825, Prescott was named to the province's Council, serving until 1838. He died at his home at the age of 87. His restored home is now the Prescott House Museum, part of the Nova Scotia Museum system.
