= Noah Stoddard =

American privateer (1755–1850)

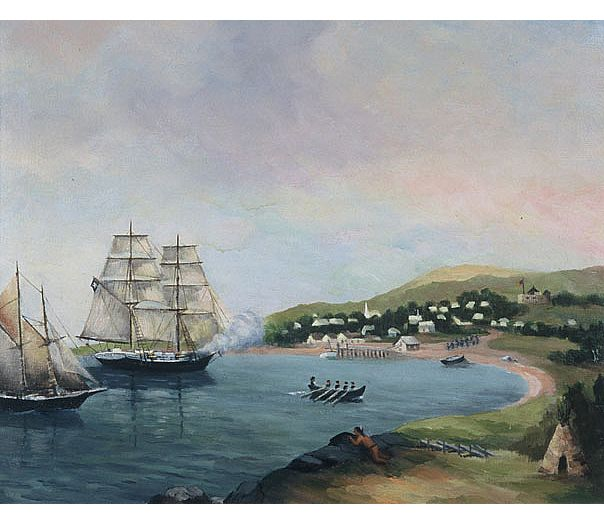
Brigantine MA Hope (Herbert Woodbury) and Schooner MA Scammell (Noah Stoddard), Raid on Lunenburg (1782) by A.J. Wright

Captain Noah Stoddard (1755–1850) of Fairhaven, Massachusetts was an American privateer who distinguished himself during the American Revolution by leading the Raid on Lunenburg (1782). In the raid, Stoddard led four other privateer vessels and attacked the British settlement at Lunenburg, Nova Scotia on July 1, 1782. In Nova Scotia, the assault on Lunenburg was the most spectacular raid of the war.

== American Revolution ==
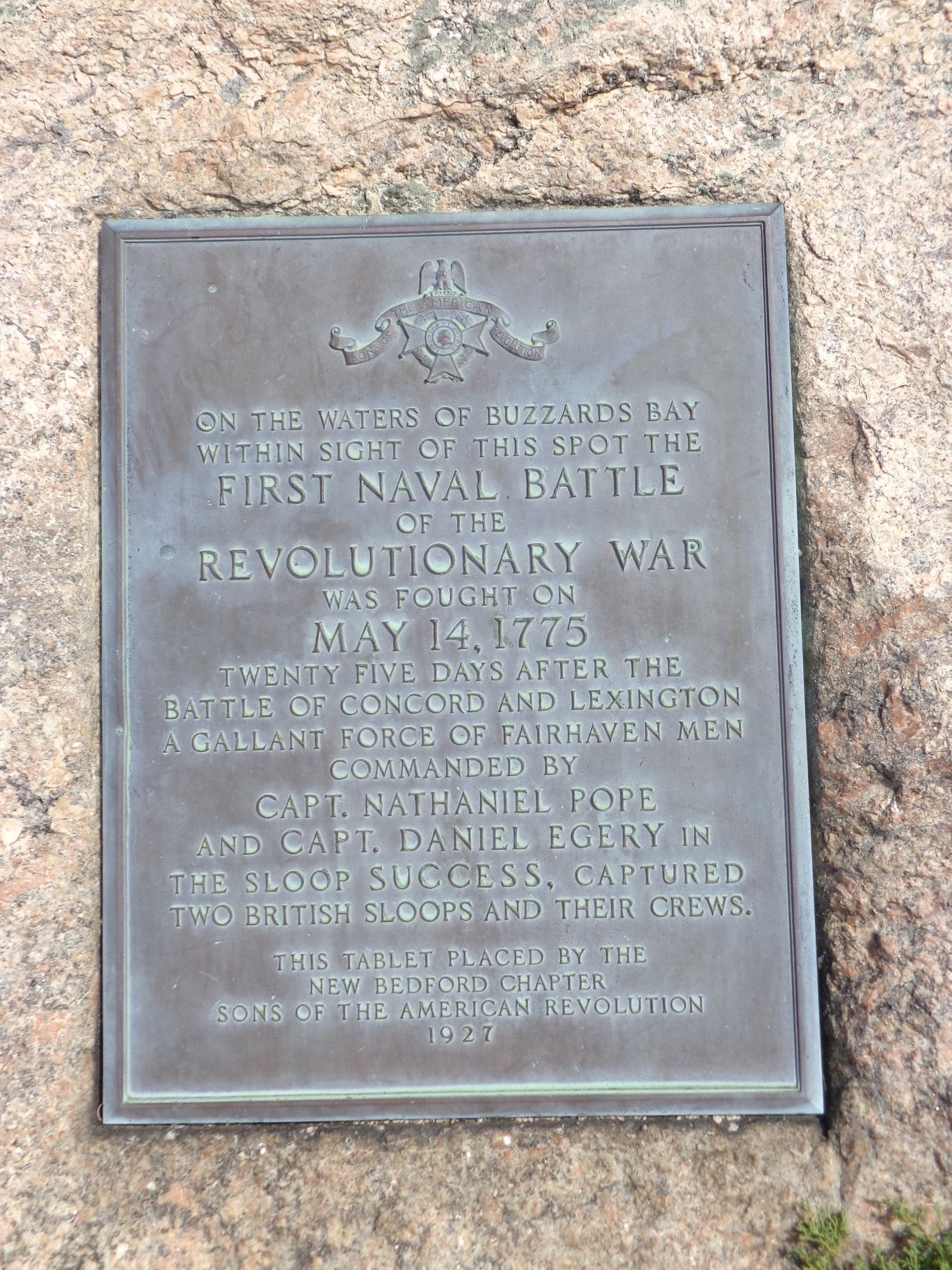
1st Naval Battle American Revolution Plaque Fort Phoenix, Massachusetts

Stoddard was involved in the first naval engagement of the American Revolution, Battle off Fairhaven, when patriots retrieved two vessels that had been captured by the British sloop of war, Falcon, in Buzzards Bay. On May 14, 1775, American Captain Daniel Egery and Capt. Nathaniel Pope of Fairhaven in the sloop Success (40 guns, 30 men) retrieved two vessels captured by the British crew of Captain John Linzee (Lindsey), Royal Navy commander of HMS Falcon (14 guns, 110 men). Stoddard and the others took the first naval prisoners of the war, 13 British crew, two were wounded and one died. He later captured the ship Fox.

On 21 and 23 April 1780 Iris, Delaware, and Otter captured the American vessels Amazon, General Wayne, and Neptune. The capture had taken place a few leagues from Sandy Hook and Iris and Delaware brought them into New York on 1 May. Amazon, of eight guns, had a crew of 30 men under the command of Captain Noah Stoddard. She was a Massachusetts letter of marque brigantine.

Stoddard commissioned Scammell in April 1782. Soon after, he rescued the 60 American prisoners on board HMS Blonde, which had wrecked on Seal Island, Nova Scotia. Stoddard allowed the British crew to return to Halifax in HMS Observer (which was involved in the Naval battle off Halifax en route).

== Afterward ==
In 1785, Stoddard was detained while visiting Halifax and sued in Halifax Supreme Court by the Cochran brothers for the theft of rum.

Stoddard also participated in founding the New Bedford Academy (later named the Fairhaven Academy) (1800).

During the War of 1812, Stoddard captured a traitor at Fort Phoenix.

Stoddard died in New Bedford, January 29, 1850, aged 95, and is buried at the Riverside Cemetery, Fairhaven.

== See also ==
- Nova Scotia in the American Revolution

== Links ==
- Scammel (Stoddard)
