= George Wait Babcock =

George Wait Babcock (b. Exeter, Rhode Island. January 25, 1751- d. Hopewell, Ontario, New York, United States 18 Mar 1816) was one of the most successful American privateers of the American Revolution, capturing 28 British vessels while in command of the Marlborough. He also led the land forces in the Raid on Lunenburg (1782) during the American Revolution.

== Career ==
Babcock was commissioned to the Rhode Island privateer Marlborough on 11 December 1777. Babcock made an extended cruise on the African coast, capturing or destroying twenty-eight vessels and destroying the British trading station on the Îles de Los. Upon returning to Boston, Babcock fell in with the British vessel Hope, under the command of Joseph Browne. The fight lasted for two hours and Babcock destroyed the mast, rigging and sails of the Hope. Despite the damage, the Hope was able to escape to Halifax and arrived on 26 September 1778.

On 18 January 1779, Babcock ransacked the brigantine Lord Clare and the brig Nautilus under the command of Hawson.

In March 1779, Babcock was commissioned to the Massachusetts privateer General Mifflin (20 guns, 100 men). Babcock fell in with the Tartar (26 guns, 160 men). The attack killed the captain of the Tartar and twenty-two others, while Babcock only lost two men. The Mifflin had taken two other prizes a store ship named Elephant and the brig Betsey. He had captured about 200 prisoners, which he traded for Americans taken prisoner by the British.

On 7 September 1779 Babcock fell in with a sloop of war and fought her for 1.5 hours. The Americans had three killed and seven wounded and were much shot up in the masts and rigging and so bore away.

In 1780 Babcock took command of the Mifflin with an uncle of Oliver Hazard Perry as a member of his crew.

On 11 June 1781, Babcock took command of the Venus (16 guns, 83 men) Babcock and crew were captured on 16 July 1781 by frigate HMS Danae (Captain Thomas Lloyd) and Surprize (Captain Samuel Reeve) off of Cape Race, Newfoundland. Babcock and the Venus were taken into Halifax where Venus was condemned. Babcock was exchanged, arriving in Boston in a prisoner cartel on 13 August 1781, with most of his crew. Babcock and the other prisoners on the cartel reported that they were

" . . . used with uncommon humanity and kindness, not only when on board, but also on their arrival at Halifax, both by the Captain and the Governor [Sir Andrew Snape Hamond, aboard the Danae] and they take this method of publicly testifying their gratitude to those gentlemen for the same."

Babcock’s final command was of the schooner Hero (9 guns, 25 men), commissioned 28 May 1781. While on the Hero, Babcock was involved in gathering intelligence at Chester, Nova Scotia, and the following day, he led the land forces in the Raid on Lunenburg.
