= Herbert Woodbury =

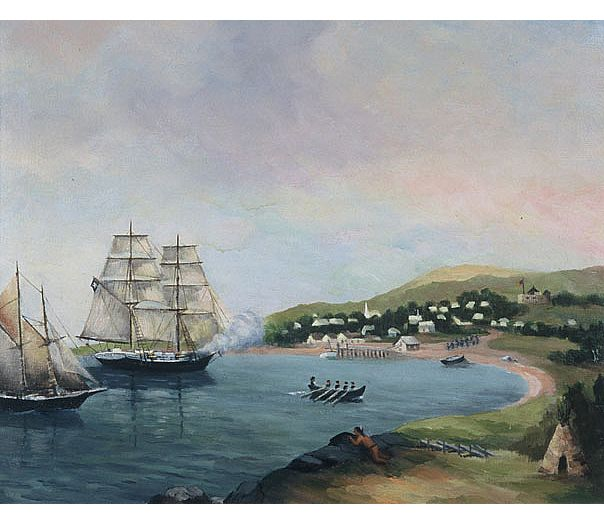
Brigantine MA Hope (Woodbury) and Schooner MA Scammell (Noah Stoddard), Raid on Lunenburg (1782) by A.J. Wright

Herbert Woodberry (1745–1809) was an American privateer from Beverly, Massachusetts who was in command of the Brigantine Hope (60 tons, 6 guns) in the Raid on Lunenburg (1782). Woodberry and his crew also have the rare distinction of being captured by the British only to escape and then recapture their own ship and seize their captors.

== Career ==
In 1780, Woodberry was commissioned master of a brigantine, Fanny, with 6 guns, 15 men, and a letter of marque. On May 28, 1781, Fanny was captured by H.B.M. Providence.

Woodberry took command of the MA Hope on May 28, 1782.

On June 30, 1782, Woodbury, commanding the Brigantine MA Hope, was involved in gathering intelligence in Chester, Nova Scotia. The following day he was involved in the Raid on Lunenburg.

On September 25, 1782, Woodbury was cruising off the coast of Newfoundland and the Hope (35 men) was taken by the Nova Scotia privateer Prince Edward (160 tons, 16 guns, 60 men), under the command of Captain Simmonds. (The Prince Edward was formerly the American privateer the Wilkes from Gloucester that had been captured and renamed by the British.) The Hero crew was brought on board the Nova Scotian privateer. Prince Edward led the Hope into Chateau Bay, Labrador. While in port the Captains went fishing and the crew of the Hero overtook the crew of the Prince Edward. Upon the commander's return from fishing, Commander Simmonds was taken prisoner. The prisoners were let go but the Prince Edward was taken back to the Beverly and was sold at auction.
