= Raid on Lunenburg, Nova Scotia (1782) =

Battle of the American Revolutionary War

Raid on Lunenburg
- Part of the American Revolution
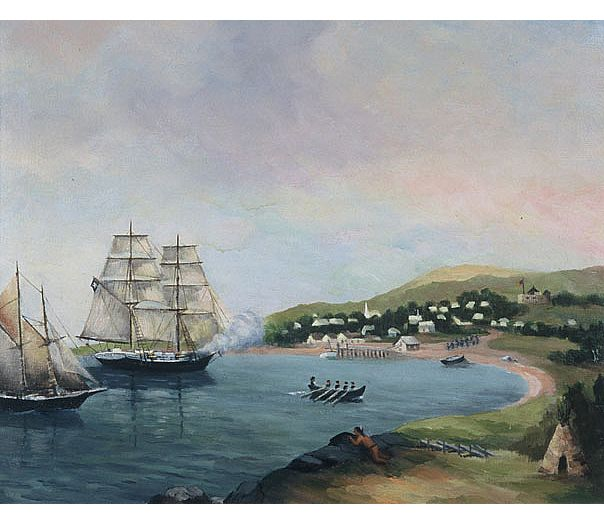
- Brigantine MA Hope (Herbert Woodbury) and Schooner MA Scammell (Noah Stoddard), Raid on Lunenburg (1782) by A. J. Wright
Date	July 1, 1782
Location	Lunenburg, Nova Scotia 44°22′40″N 64°18′34″W
Result	American victory

Belligerents
Great Britain	United States

Commanders and leaders
John Creighton (POW); Dettlieb Christopher Jessen; Joseph Pernette; Johann Gottlob Schmeisser	Noah Stoddard; George Wait Babcock; Gregory Powers; Herbert Woodbury; John Tibbets

Strength
Unknown	5 vessels 170 crew members

Casualties and losses
1 killed; 3 prisoners	4 wounded

The Raid on Lunenburg (also known as the Sack of Lunenburg) occurred during the American Revolution when the US privateer, Captain Noah Stoddard of Fairhaven, Massachusetts on the 'Scammell' with four other privateer vessels attacked the British settlement at Lunenburg, Nova Scotia on July 1, 1782. The raid was the last major privateer attack on a Nova Scotia community during the war.

Lunenburg was defended by militia leaders Colonel John Creighton and Major Dettlieb Christopher Jessen. In Nova Scotia, the assault on Lunenburg was the most spectacular raid of the war. On the morning of July 1, Stoddard led approximately 170 US privateers in five heavily armed vessels and overpowered Lunenburg’s defence, capturing the blockhouses, burning Creighton's home, and filling Jessen's house with bullet holes. The privateers then looted the settlement and kept the militia at bay with the threat of destroying the entire town. The American privateers plundered the town and took three prisoners, including Creighton, who were later released from Boston without a ransom having been paid.

== Background ==
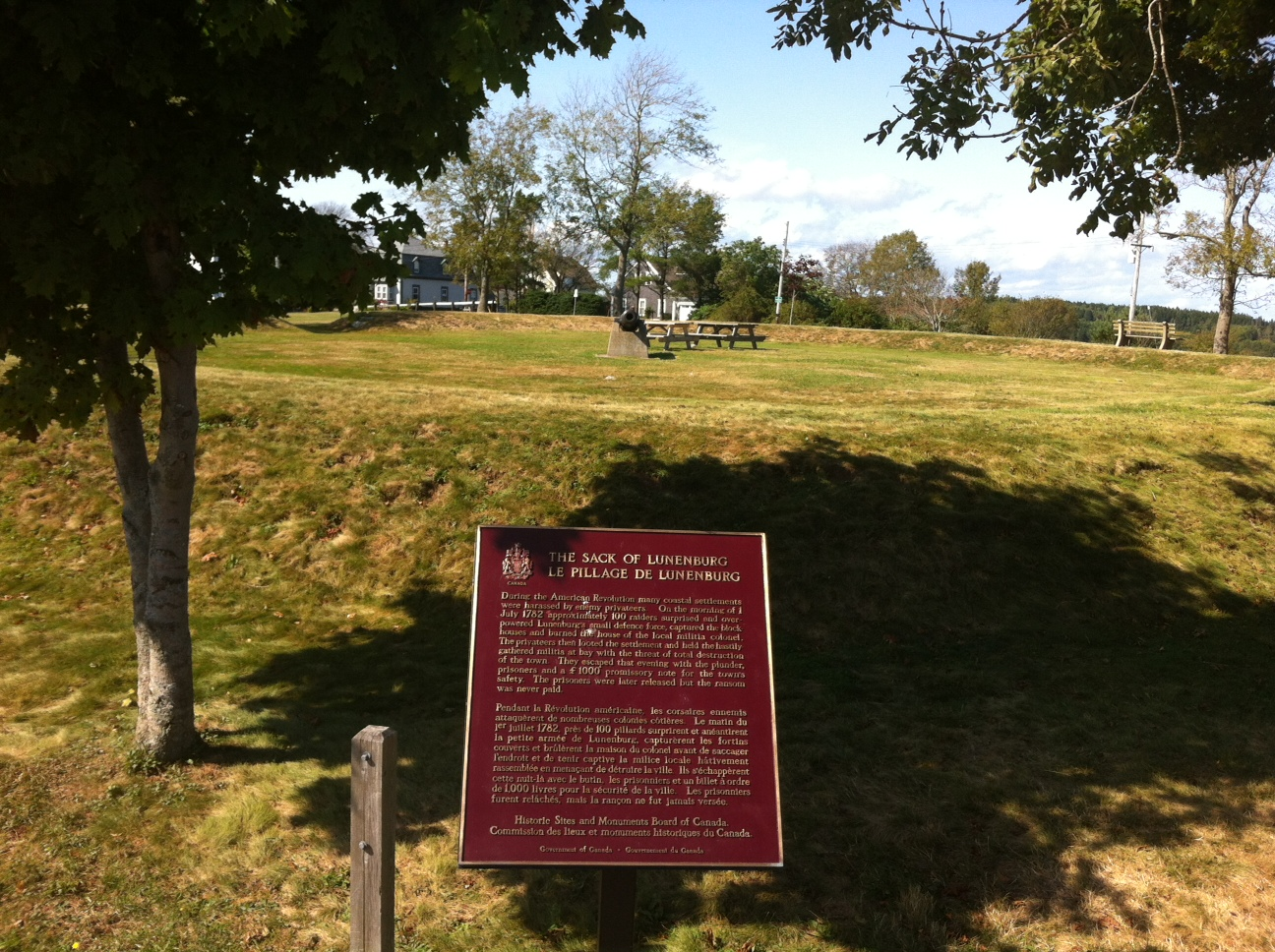
Raid on Lunenburg (1782) – National Historic Sites of Canada Plaque with earthworks of Blockhouse Hill in background, Lunenburg, Nova Scotia

During the American Revolution, Nova Scotia was invaded regularly by American Revolutionary forces by land and sea. Throughout the war, American privateers devastated the maritime economy by raiding many of the coastal communities. There were constant attacks by privateers, which had begun seven years earlier with the Raid on Saint John (1775) and included raids on all the major outposts in Nova Scotia.

Lunenburg was engaged with American privateers numerous times during the war. In 1775 the 84th Regiment, led by Captain John MacDonald, had been defending Nova Scotia, attacking an American privateer ship off of Lunenburg. They boarded the warship when some of her crew were ashore seeking plunder. They captured the crew and sailed her into Halifax. In February 1778 Colonel Creighton appealed to the Government to address the "Mischiefs done to the settlement of Lunenburg by the New England Privateers." In response, the government ordered the armed vessel Loyal Nova Scotian to Lunenburg. On February 25, 1780, while the American privateer Sally floated in Lunenburg harbour under the command of Moses Tinney, four American privateers came ashore for provisions. Colonel Creighton ordered the privateers to be taken prisoner and fired at their brigantine Sally. Creighton then ordered two boats of men to board Sally, but the privateers resisted. Creighton ordered the blockhouse to fire two guns at the privateer. Sally surrendered and the privateers were taken prisoner and Sally brought to Halifax.

On March 18, 1780, the Lunenburg militia secured the American prisoners taken from the American privateer Kitty on the LaHave River. They took the vessel back to Lunenburg and sold it. A month later, on April 15, 1780, the Lunenburg militia (35 men) and the British brigantine John and Rachael captured an American privateer prize, also named Sally, off LaHave River. During the seizure, the privateers killed the head of the militia (McDonald) and wounded two of the crew members of John and Rachael.

On March 15, 1782, Captain Amos Potter, released after the Raid on Annapolis Royal (1781), returned from Boston in the Resolution and captured the schooner Two Sisters off Pearl Island, Mahone Bay (formerly Green Island), stole all the provisions on board, and released it.

The following month Stoddard's vessel Scammell was commissioned in April 1782 and made the plan in Boston to raid Lunenburg. Soon after, he rescued the 60 American prisoners on board HMS Blonde, which was wrecked on Seal Island, Nova Scotia. Stoddard allowed the British crew to return to Halifax in HMS Observer (which was involved in the Naval battle off Halifax en route).

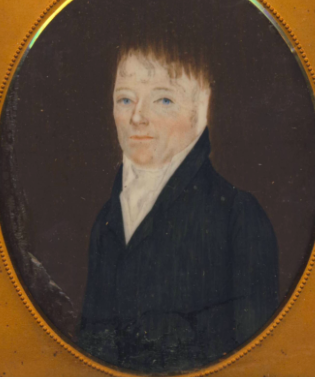
Jonathan Prescott (1725–1807), Chester, Nova Scotia

On June 30, the day before the raid on Lunenburg, Stoddard and two other privateers descended on Chester, Nova Scotia firing cannon from their vessels. Captain of the militia Jonathan Prescott informed the privateers that the military forces were gone from Lunenburg and were headed to Chester. In response, the American privateers left Chester and went on to attack Lunenburg.

== Raid on Lunenburg ==
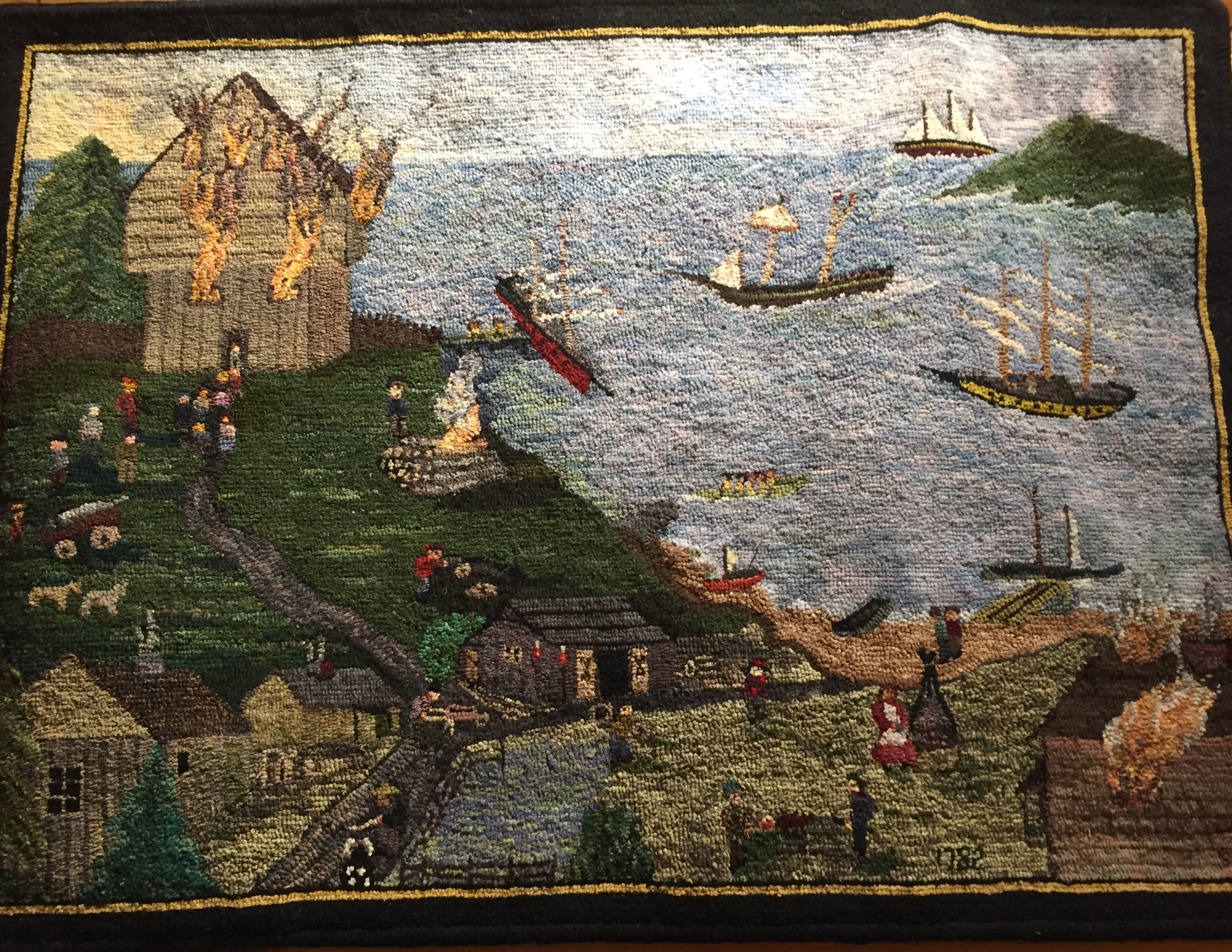
American privateers burned blockhouse (top left) and commanding officer John Creighton's home (bottom right), The Sacking of Lunenburg by Suzanne Conrad, Rug Hooking Museum of North America, Queensland, Nova Scotia

During the early morning of July 1, 1782, five American privateers that had left Boston under the command of Captain Noah Stoddard began to raid Lunenburg. Captain Stoddard's ship was the schooner Scammel, which had sixteen guns and sixty men. Stoddard organized both a land and sea assault of the town. The vessels first landed at Red Head (present-day Blue Rocks), two miles outside of the town. From there, George Wait Babcock led 90 soldiers overland toward the town. The vessels then moved toward a frontal assault on the town.

The Lunenburg militia of 20 men was led by Colonel John Creighton and Major D.C. Jessen. Colonel Creighton and five other militia men occupied the eastern blockhouse and began firing at the approaching land assault. Several of Captain Stoddard’s privateers were wounded. The landed fleet of privateers then rounded East Point. The vessels landed and quickly took control of the western blockhouse and established themselves at Blockhouse Hill (see image above). Colonel Creighton and others in the blockhouse were cannonaded into silence and the blockhouse burned. Colonel Creighton surrendered and was taken prisoner along with two other men aboard Captain Stoddard’s vessel Scammel.

Resistance was also offered by Major D.C. Jessen. He was initially held up in his home, which the privateers fired full of bullets. He escaped and his house was looted. Major Jessen assembled with a militia behind the hill overlooking the town. A militia from LaHave under the command of Major Joseph Pernette also advanced toward Lunenburg to join Major Jessen. Captain Stoddard sent a message to Jessen and Pernette informing them that if they advanced on the town, all the homes would be burned. To ensure his threat was not idle, Captain Stoddard burned down Creighton's home.

Captain Stoddard's privateers looted the town and destroyed what remained. The Reverend Johann Gottlob Schmeisser tried to intervene, was bound by the privateers, and placed in the middle of town. Rev. Peter de la Roche signed a ransom agreement with American privateers. (De la Roche also became first Anglican minister at Guysborough, Nova Scotia).

Relief came when Lt. Governor Hamond dispatched from Halifax three ships under the command of Captain Douglass of HMS Chatham, one of which had 200 Hessian soldiers aboard. Captain Stoddard began the retreat and made his way to Boston with his prisoners. Despite not having received a ransom, Stoddard released Colonel Creighton and the other prisoners after they arrived in Boston.

Sylvia, an African working for Creighton, was a significant part of Lunenburg's resistance to the raid. She assisted in supplying munitions to Creighton at the blockhouse and sheltered his son. In addition, after being released from captivity by Stoddard, she also protected the home and possessions of Major Jessen. Whether Sylvia was a free black or a slave is unknown. According to the St. Paul's Church (Halifax) cemetery records, she is listed as a "black servant." She died in Halifax on March 12, 1824 at age 70 and is buried in the Old Burying Ground (Halifax, Nova Scotia).

== Aftermath ==
The raid on Lunenburg was the last major privateer attack of the war. On August 29, 1782 American privateer Wasp, with 19 men under the command of Captain Thomas Thompson, captured a vessel off Chester. He then spent two nights on East Ironbound Island. On September 1 Wasp sailed to Pennant Point and was confronted by three men from Sambro, Nova Scotia, who fired on the crew, killing one and wounding three others including Captain Thomas Thompson. Captain Perry took command of the vessel and the privateers took one of the Sambro men prisoner. The privateers buried their crew member on an island in Pennant bay. They then began their return to Massachusetts by rowing to West Dover, Nova Scotia, and then on to Cross Island ("Croo Island") just off Lunenburg ("Malegash"). On September 3, 1782, Henry Vogle of the Lunenburg militia recaptured a shallop taken by American privateers, which was witnessed by those on Wasp. On September 5, Wasp tried to enter LaHave River but was fired on by the local inhabitants and so continued on to Port Medway.

Also on September 1, Captain Powers of the privateer Dolphin was chased ashore at LaHave River by Captain John Crymes of the Observer, who had commanded her earlier in the Battle off Halifax (1782). Powers and the crew escaped ashore and Crymes took the Dolphin to Liverpool.

== Gallery ==
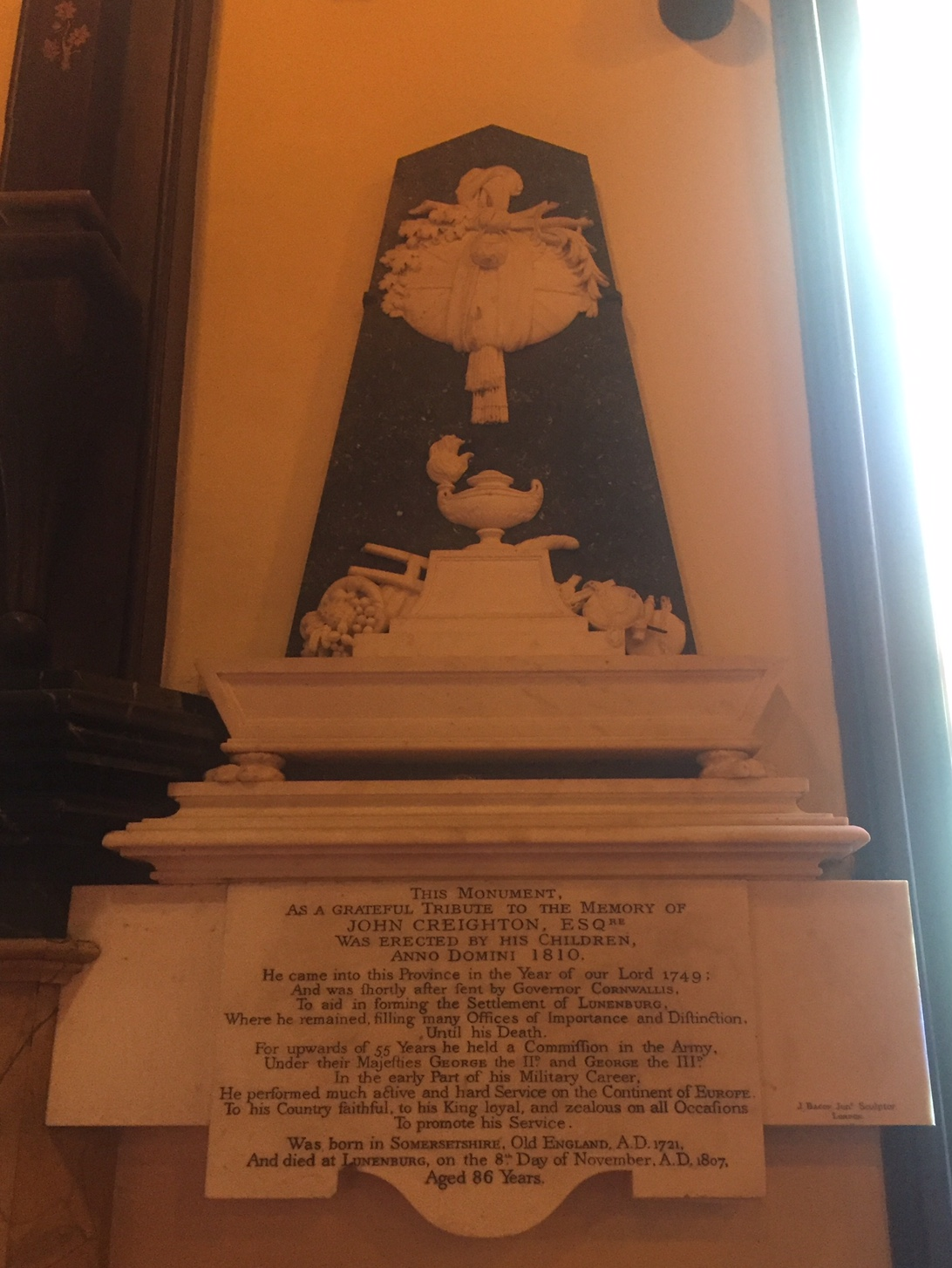
Col. John Creighton Sr. - leader of militia; home burned

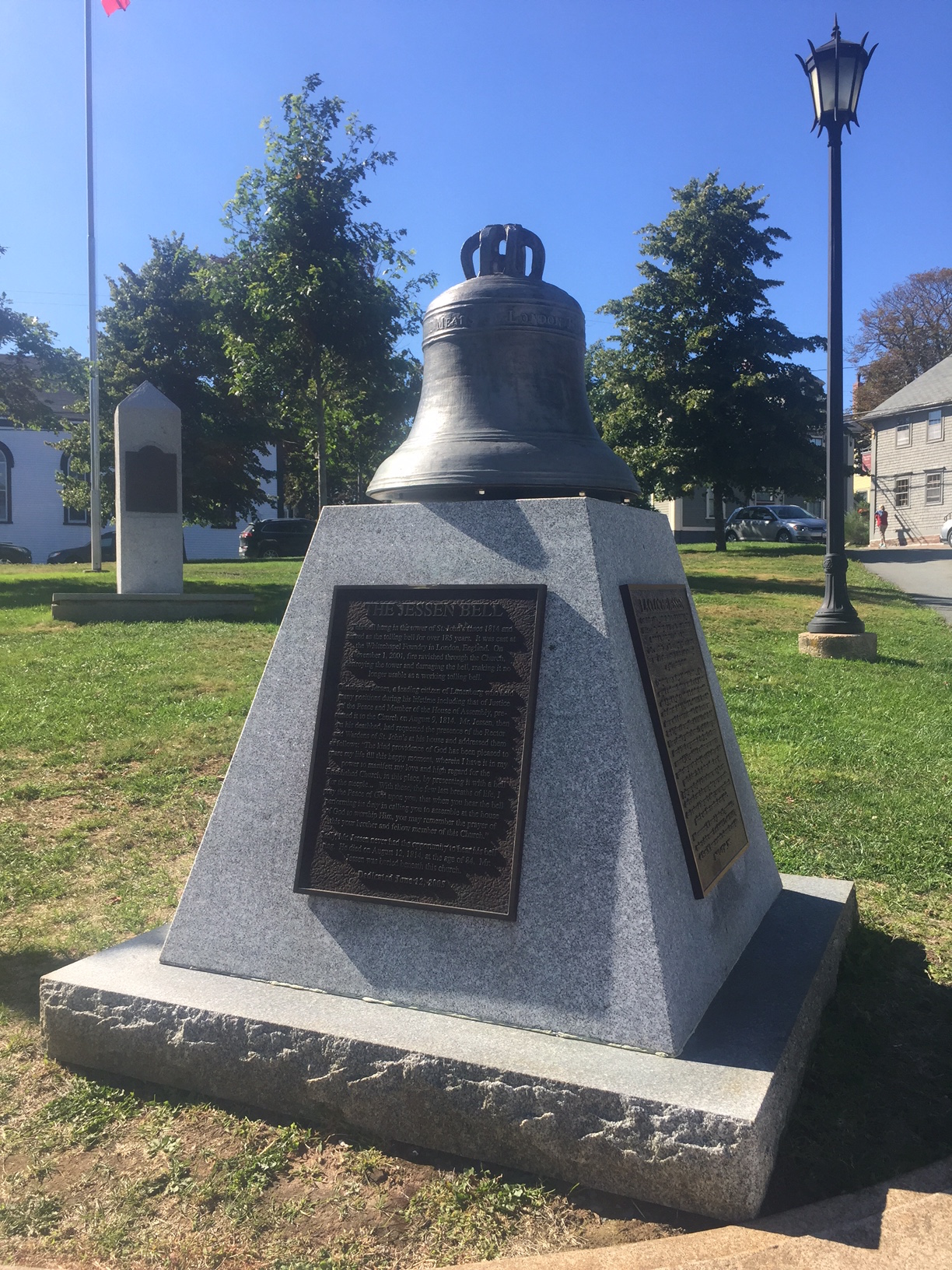
The Jessen Bell - Major D.C. Jessen - leader of militia; home looted

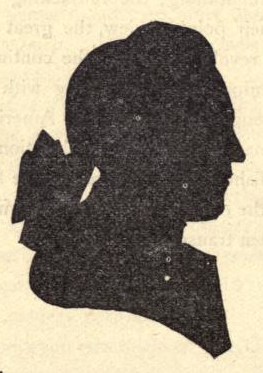
Johann Gottlob Schmeisser

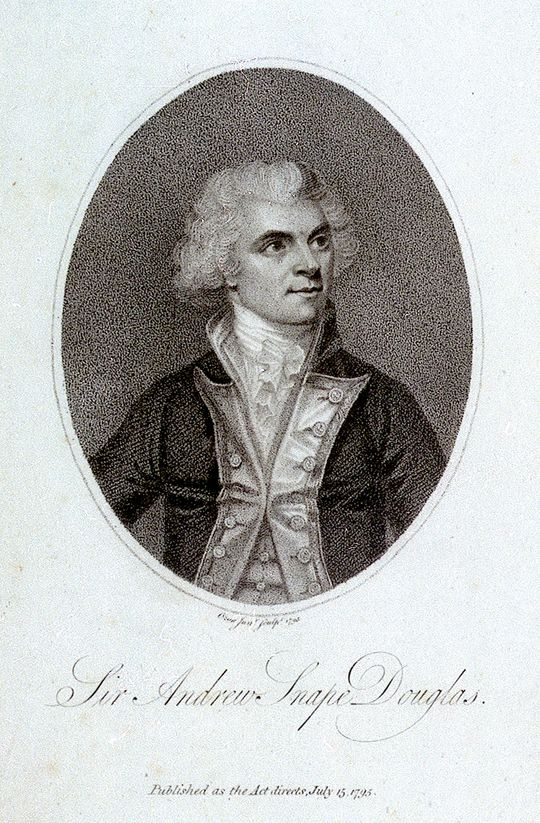
Captain Andrew Snape Douglas

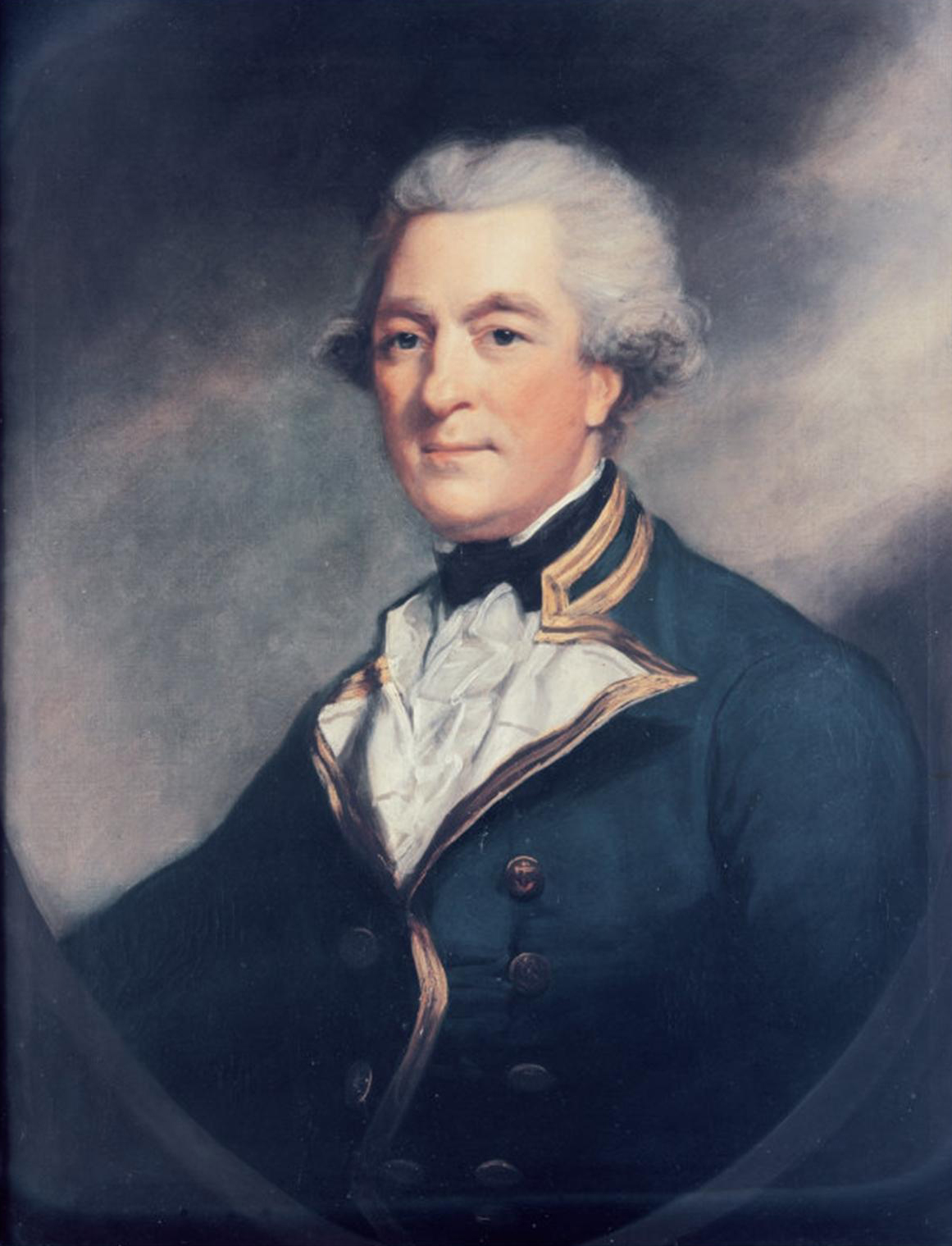
Lt. Governor Hamond

== In fiction ==
- Jan Andrews. The Dancing Sun: A Celebration of Canadian Children, 1981
- Joyce Barkhouse. "The Heroine of Lunenburg", with illustrations by Peter Ferguson.

== See also ==
- Colonial American military history
- Military history of Nova Scotia#American Revolution

== Bibliography ==
- Allen, Gardner Weld. A Naval History of the American Revolution, p. 595.
- Creighton, Agnes (October 1905). "An Unforeclosed Mortgage", Acadiensis
- DesBrisay, Mather Byles (1895). History of the county of Lunenburg, pp. 62–68
- Eastman, Ralph M. (1928). "Captain Noah Stoddard" in Some Famous Privateers of New England. pp. 61–63.
- Gwyn, Julian (2003). Frigates and Foremasts: The North American Squadron in Nova Scotia Waters, 1745–1815, University of British Columbia Press. ISBN 0774809116.
- MacMechan, Archibald (1923), "The Sack of Lunenburg" in Sagas of the Sea. The Temple Press, pp. 57–72.
- A History of American Privateers
- Massachusetts Privateers, p. 176

Primary documents

- The Boston Gazette, and the Country Journal, Monday, July 15, 1782;
- The Massachusetts Spy: Or, American Oracle of Liberty [Worcester], Thursday, July 25, 1782;
- The Continental Journal [Boston], Thursday, July 18, 1782.
- Joseph Pernette to Franklin, letter, dated at La Have, July 3, 1782, reprinted in DesBrisay, Mather Byles, History of the County of Lunenburg, Toronto: Wesley Briggs, 1895, 65–67.
- Leonard Rudolf's account in Invasion of Lunenburg in Acadie and the Acadians
