= Battle off Halifax (1782) =

Naval battle in American Revolutionary War

- Part of the American Revolutionary War
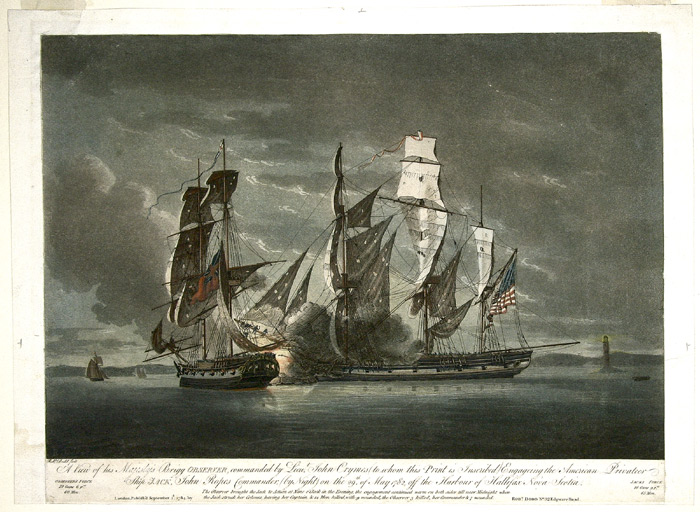
- Battle off Halifax by Robert Dodd
Date	28–29 May 1782
Location	off Halifax, Nova Scotia 44.3°N 63.4°W
Result	British victory

Belligerents
Great Britain	United States

Commanders and leaders
John Crymes	David Ropes †

Strength
Brig Observer	Privateer Jack

Casualties and losses
3 killed 5 wounded	7 killed 13 wounded Jack captured

The Battle off Halifax took place on 28 May 1782 during the American Revolutionary War. It involved the American privateer Jack and the 14-gun Royal Naval brig HMS Observer off Halifax, Nova Scotia. Captain David Ropes commanded Jack, and Lieutenant John Crymes commanded Observer. The battle was "a long and severe engagement" in which Captain David Ropes was killed.

== Background ==
During the American Revolution, Americans regularly attacked Nova Scotia by land and sea. American privateers devastated the maritime economy by raiding many of the coastal communities, such as the numerous raids on Liverpool and on Annapolis Royal.

On the 7th of July, 1777, off the coast of Halifax, Sir George Collier, in command of HMS Rainbow, with a force of two British frigates and a brig, opened fire on and captured John Manley, the second in command of the Continental Navy, and the 13-gun frigate Hancock (229 men) off the coast of Nova Scotia. After a running battle lasting 39 hours, the British succeeded in capturing both Hancock and Boston, and retaking Fox (60 men). Collier returned to Halifax on 11 July with his prizes. Manley was transported to New York and imprisoned until March 1778.

The engagement between Jack and Observer was one of several in the region. On 10 July 1780, the British 16-gun privateer brig Resolution under the command of Thomas Ross engaged the American 22-gun privateer Viper (130 men) off Halifax at Sambro Light. In what one observer described as "one of the bloodiest battles in the history of privateering," the two privateers began a "severe engagement" during which both pounded each other with cannon fire for about 90 minutes. The engagement resulted in the surrender of the British ship and the death of up to 18 British and 33 American sailors.

Jack herself had been involved in a previous naval engagement. Jack (or Saucy Jack) was originally a Massachusetts privateer commissioned in September 1779. After three successful cruises in which she captured a number of prizes, HMS Pandora and HMS Danae captured her in July 1780 in the St. Lawrence River. The British took Jack into the Quebec Provincial Marine, though she was commissioned out of Nova Scotia. She then served as a patrol vessel for the fisheries and the St. Lawrence River. In an engagement off Cape Breton with two French frigates at Spanish River, near Cape Breton Island in 1781, she was captured by the French. They took Jack back to Boston, where her previous owners purchased her and sent her to sea again as a privateer.

Observer was herself a former Massachusetts privateer, originally built as merchantman Amsterdam, which HMS Amphitrite captured on 19 October 1781. The British sent Amsterdam into Halifax to be condemned as a prize, where the Royal Navy bought her.

== Battle ==
The British ship Observer was returning to Halifax, having rescued ten crew members of HMS Blonde stranded on Seal Island. On 28 May 1782, as Observer arrived at the Sambro Island Light near the mouth of Halifax Harbour, Jack approached her. When Jack discovered her quarry was a British naval vessel, the Americans tried to escape.

Observer chased Jack for two hours before catching her. The ships were evenly matched. The British immediately killed the American captain David Ropes as a result of the cannon fire. Both ships had numerous holes shot through their sails, and the British sailors attempted to climb the rigging of their ship in an effort to board the American privateer. The Americans repulsed this initial boarding attempt, but the British were ultimately successful. Jack struck her colours on the afternoon of 29 May.

== Aftermath ==
American privateers remained a threat to Nova Scotian ports for the rest of the war. The following month, after a failed attempt to raid Chester, Nova Scotia, American privateers struck again in the raid on Lunenburg in 1782.

== See also ==
- American Revolution – Nova Scotia theatre
- Military history of Nova Scotia
