= Barss =

Barss is a surname. Notable people with the surname include:

- James Barss (1782–1863), Canadian politician
- John Barss (1778–1851), Canadian politician
- Joseph Barss (privateer) (1776–1824), Canadian privateer
- Joseph Barss (ice hockey) (1892–1971), Canadian ice hockey player and coach
- Joseph Barss (politician) (1750–1826), Canadian politician
