= Historic Properties =

Warehouses in Halifax, Nova Scotia

Coordinates: 44.650365°N 63.572891°W

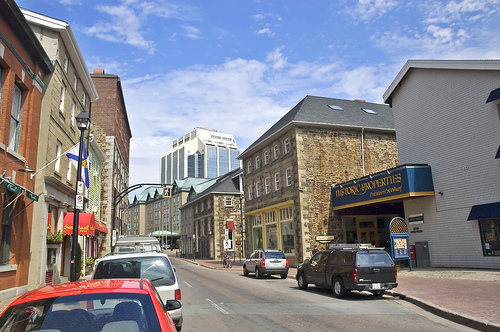
Historic Properties Halifax

The Historic Properties (also known as Privateers' Wharf) are warehouses on the Halifax Boardwalk in Halifax, Nova Scotia that began to be constructed during the Napoleonic Wars by Nova Scotian businessmen such as Enos Collins, a privateer, smuggler and shipper whose vessels defied Napoleon's blockade to bring American supplies to the British commander Duke of Wellington. These properties helped make Halifax prosperous in Canada's early days by aiding trade and commerce, but they were also frequently used as vehicles for smuggling and privateering. During the War of 1812, two of the most successful Nova Scotian privateer ships during this time period were the Liverpool Packet and the Sir John Sherbrooke.

Folk singer Stan Rogers made the Privateers Wharf famous in his songs "Barrett's Privateers" and "Bluenose". The Pontac House is named for the renowned Great Pontack (Halifax), which was located there just after the founding of Halifax (1749).

== Historical context ==
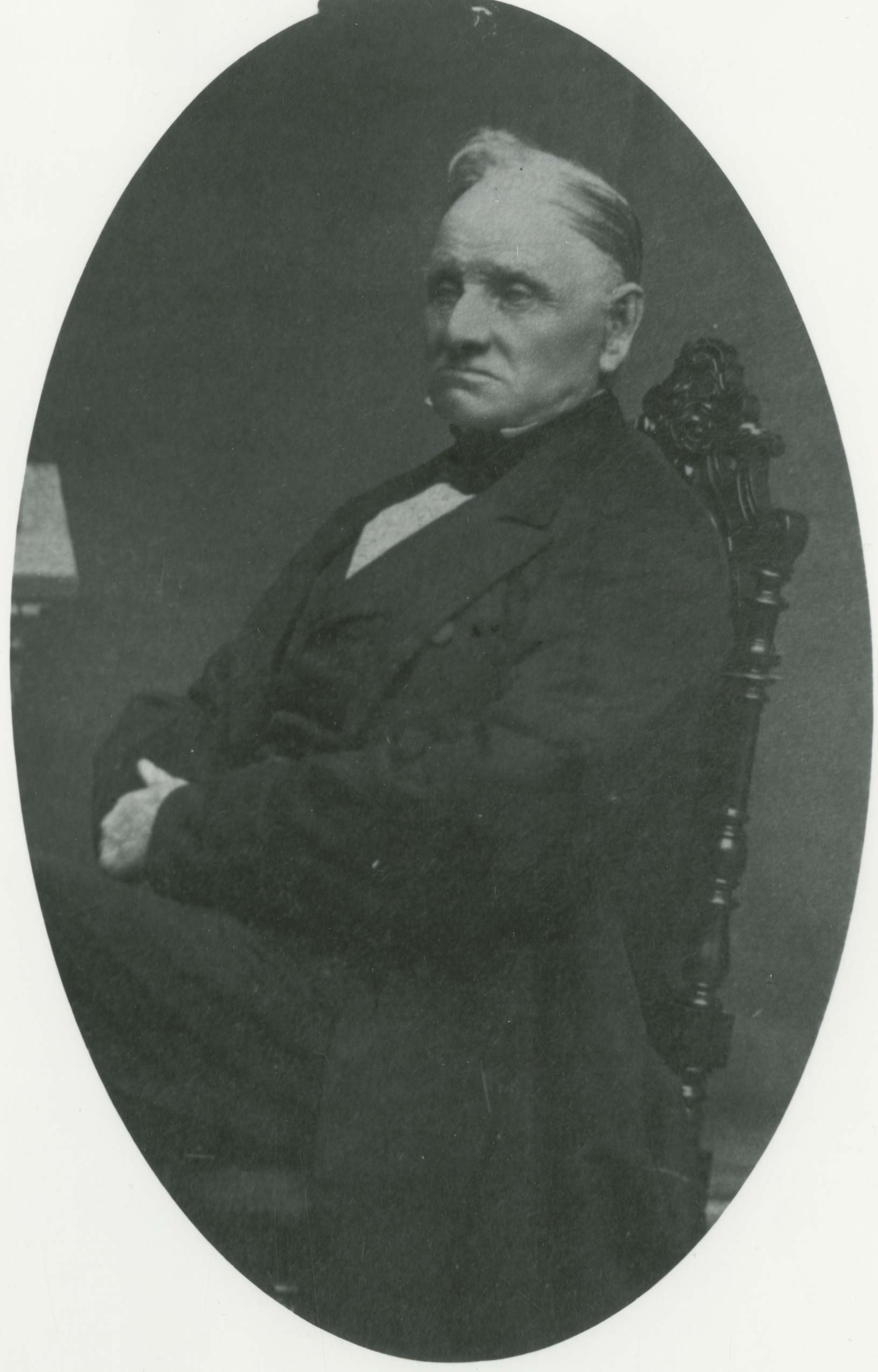
Enos Collins

The historic properties reflect the time period beginning with the War of 1812. The main contribution of Nova Scotia in the War of 1812 was privateers. Over 35 Nova Scotian Privateers seized more than 200 American merchant ships and their cargo. Merchants and traders bought them at auctions in Halifax and promptly resold them. In many cases, they even resold the Americans their own goods. Privateering was a risky business: almost a quarter of those who sailed from Nova Scotia's ports were captured by Americans, burnt or lost. (See the fate of the American Privateer Young Teazer off Halifax during the war.)

Nova Scotia had many successful privateers out of Halifax (Crown, Sir John Sherbrooke, Fly, Weazel and George); Liverpool (Liverpool Packet, Retaliation, Wolverine, Rolla, Shannon, Lively, Rover, Minerva, Saucy Jack, Dart and Dove); Annapolis Royal (Matilda and Broke); Windsor (Retrieve) and Lunenburg (Lunenburg).

== Buildings ==
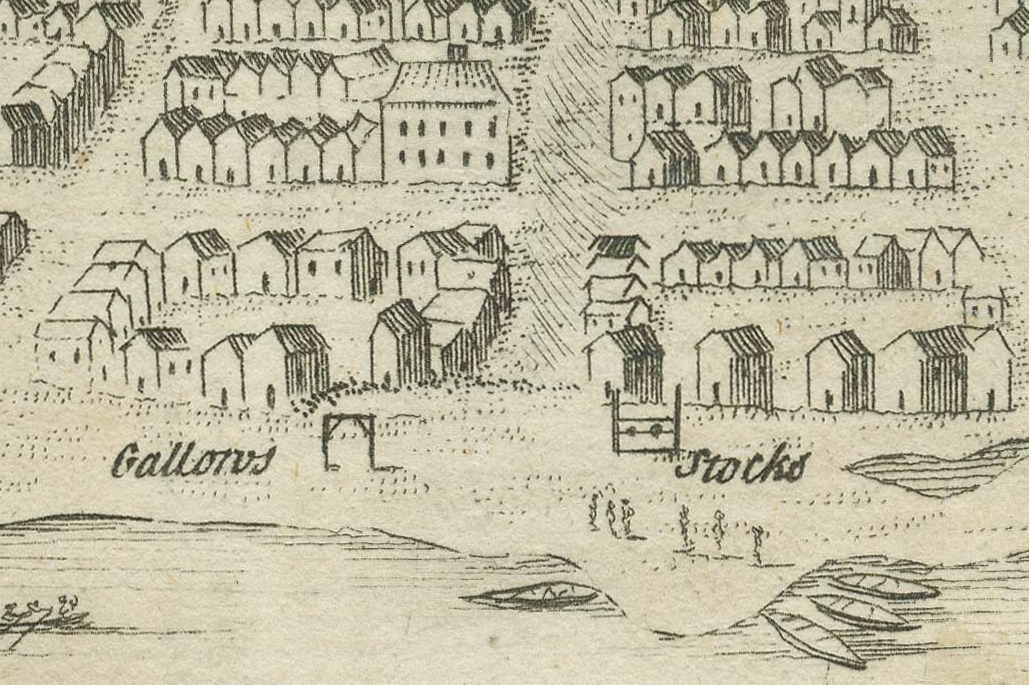
Stocks and Gallows, Halifax, Nova Scotia 1750

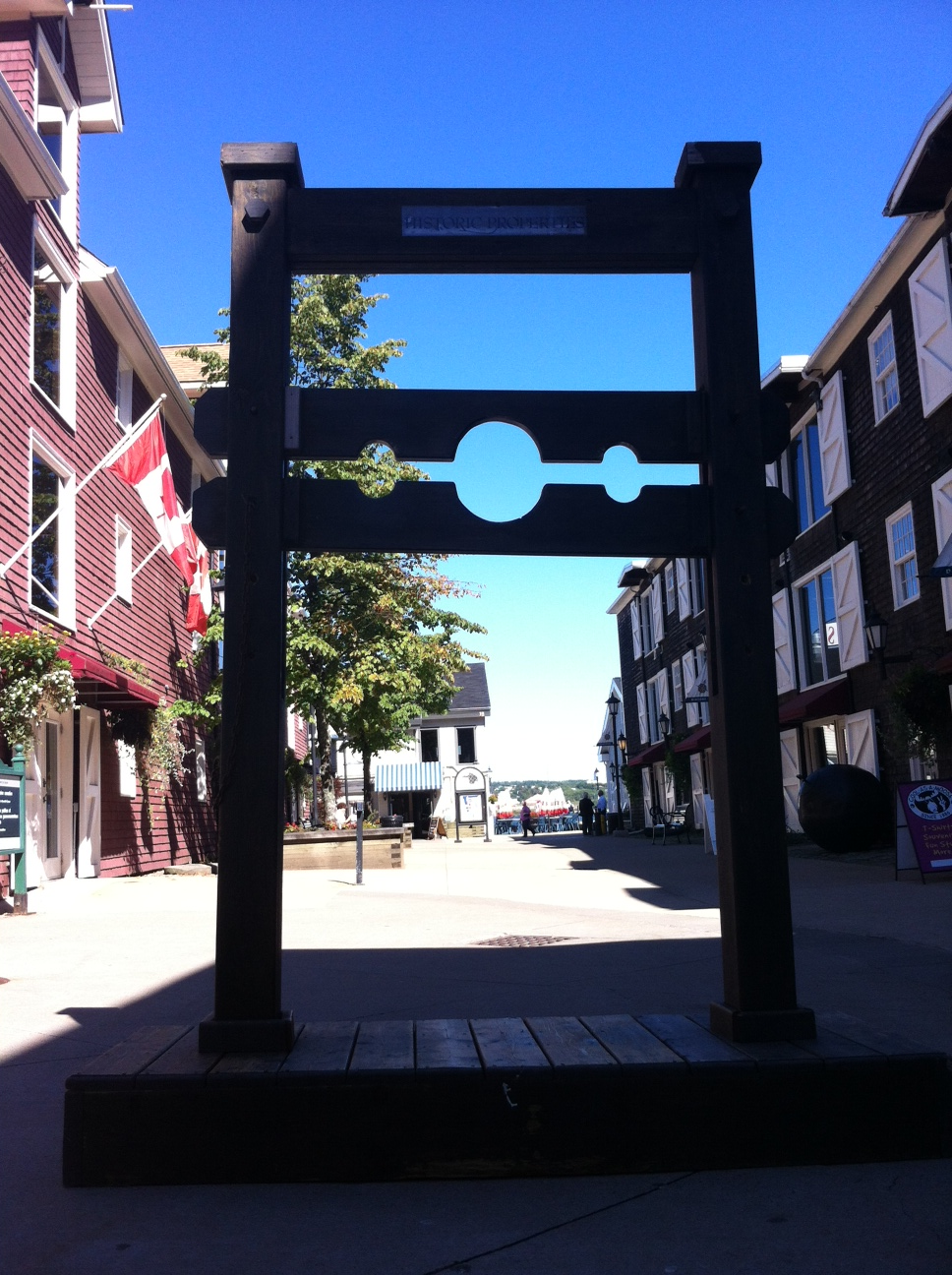
Pillory, Historic Properties

The area has ten of the city's oldest buildings, including seven which have been designated National Historic Sites. The Privateer's Wharf includes:

- Pontac House (Great Pontack (Halifax))
- Privateer Warehouse (c. 1790);
- The Red Store (1812)
- King’s Warehouse built (1831) - (now The Carpenter Shop)
- Wooden Storehouse/Loft

=== Collins Bank/ Simon’s Warehouse (1854) ===
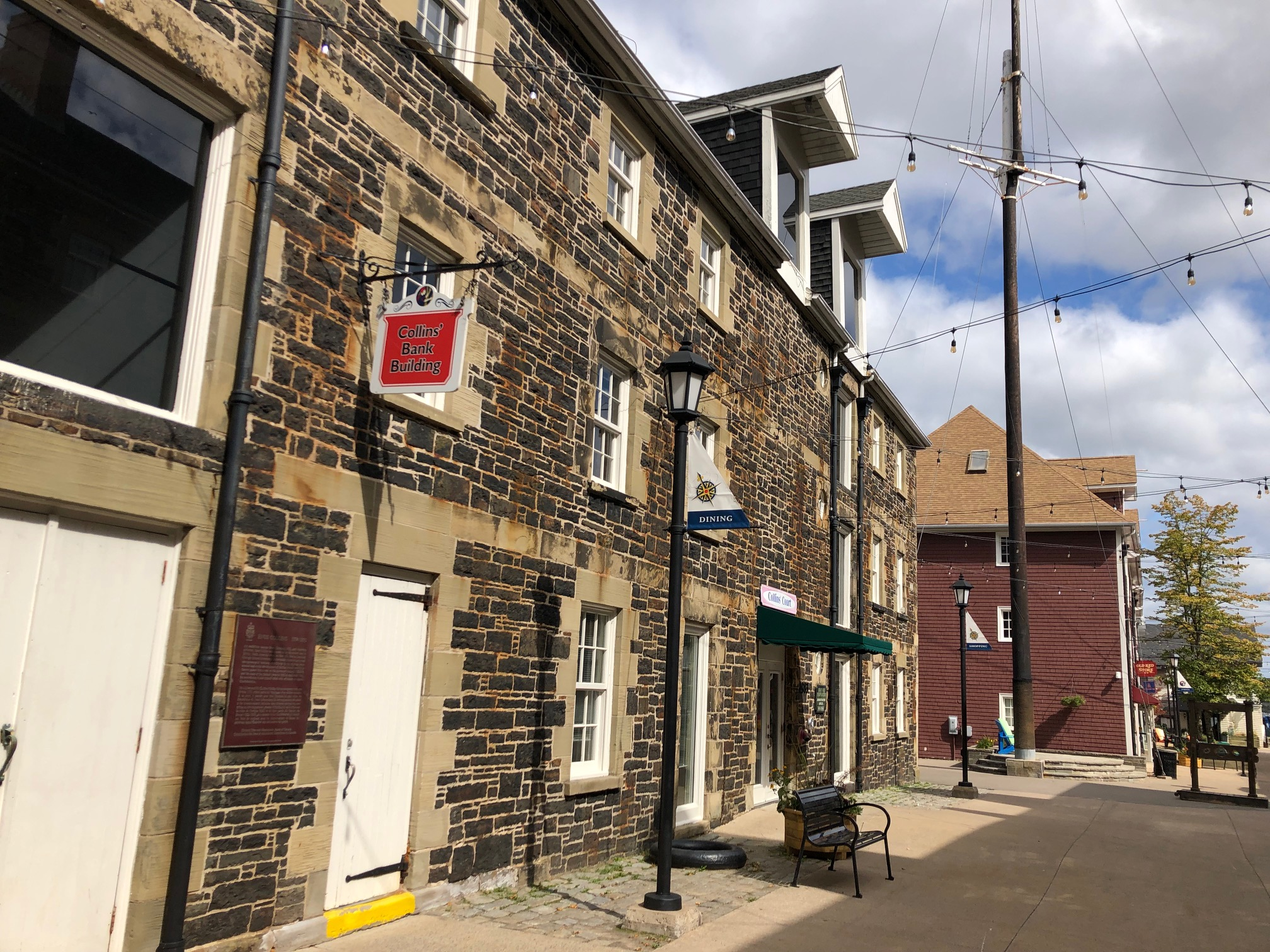
Enos Collins Bank, Historic Properties, Halifax, Nova Scotia

The Halifax Banking Company (Collins Bank) was built by Enos (1832) and eventually became the CIBC. Collins Bank/Simon's Warehouse as evolved from two buildings in its rectangular, three-and-a-half storey massing under a hipped roof with large 'hoistway' dormers vertically aligned with large 'loading' openings on the elevations; regularly placed windows, timber and random-coursed ironstone construction of Collins Bank portion and the timber and granite construction of the Simon's Warehouse portion, with sandstone quoins, lintels, and belt-courses, interior brick fire walls.

=== Pickford and Black Building (1830) ===
Collins constructed the building in 1830 and it was later owned by Pickford and Black (1876). The firm of Pickford & Black, a Nova Scotia shipping firm, was established by partners Robert Pickford (1841-1914) and William Anderson Black (1847-1934) in 1876. Pickford & Black were ship chandlers and grocers of Halifax, Nova Scotia. In 1877, the firm purchased Seeton's Wharf at 51 Water's Street. By 1887, they had expanded into the steamship line, purchasing the Cunard ships Alpha and Beta, and establishing a shipping service between Halifax, Cuba, and Bermuda (1889). Pickford and Kirke also operated steamers in the Atlantic provinces. Pickford & Black acted as agents for several leading marine insurance underwriters, including Lloyd's of London, and for several European steamship lines. Robert Pickford retired in 1911 and the company became Pickford & Black Ltd. Following the death of W.A. Black (1936), the company was involved in several mergers. In 1946, Pickford & Black Ltd. managed the Maritime Stevedoring Company, and the Pickford & Black Agency, a customs brokerage. In 1975 Pickford and Black Ltd. became a wholly owned subsidiary of McLean Kennedy Limited, and in 2002, a branch of F. K. Warren.

== See also ==
- Military history of Nova Scotia
- List of oldest buildings and structures in Halifax, Nova Scotia
- History of the Halifax Regional Municipality

== Reference texts ==
- John Boileau. Half-Hearted Enemies: Nova Scotia, New England and the War of 1812
- Susan Buggey. Halifax Waterfront Buildings: A Historical Report. Canadian Historical Sites: Occasional Papers on Archeology and History. No. 9 pp. 117-168.
