= Joseph Barss =

Joseph Barss may refer to:

- Joseph Barss (privateer)
- Joseph Barss (ice hockey)
- Joseph Barss (politician)
