= Enos Collins =

Nova Scotian merchant, banker, and privateer

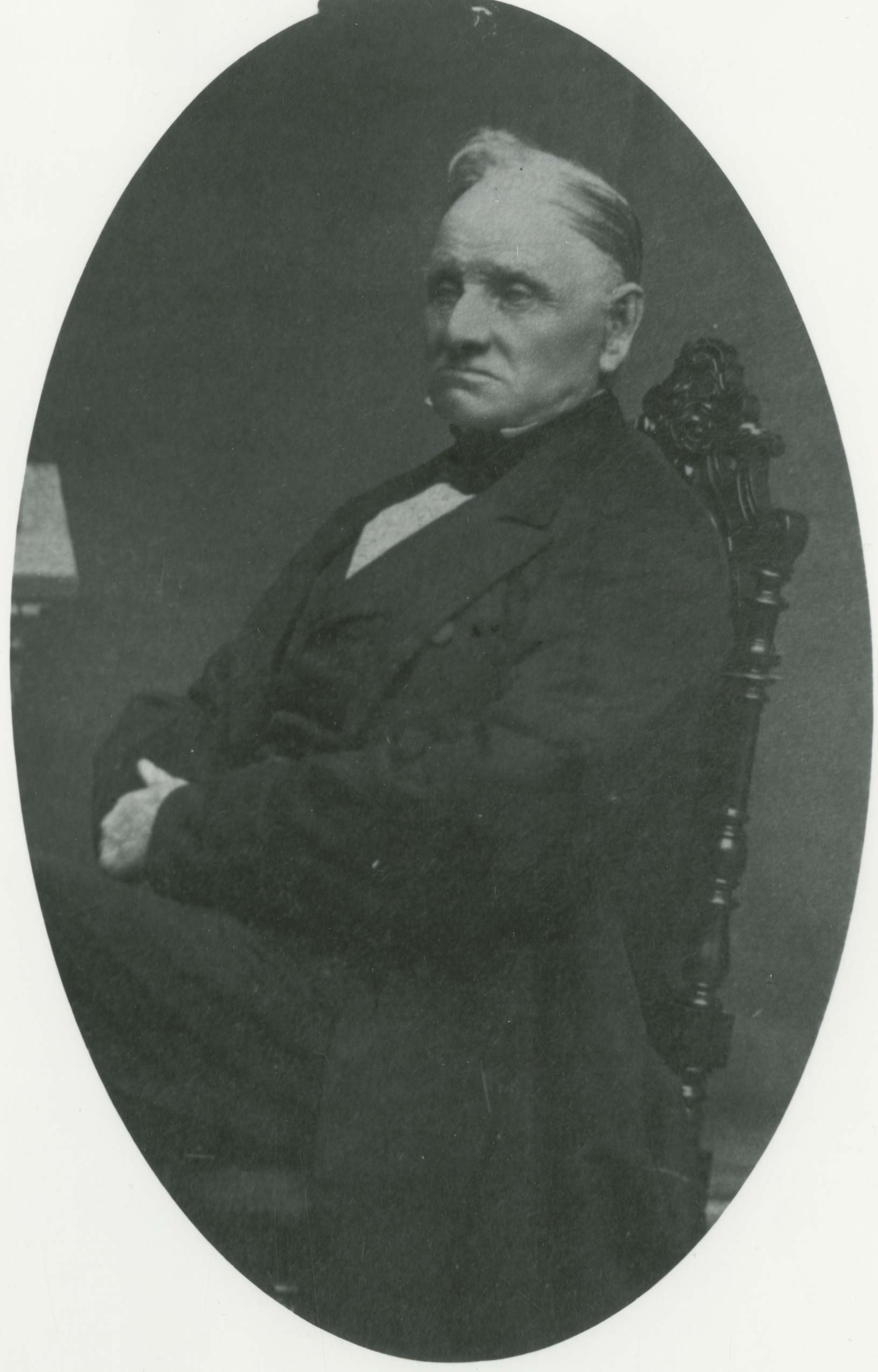
- Born: 5 September 1774; Liverpool, Nova Scotia
- Died: 18 November 1871 (aged 97); Halifax, Nova Scotia

Enos Collins (5 September 1774 – 18 November 1871) was a merchant, shipowner, banker and privateer from Nova Scotia, Canada. He is the founder of the Halifax Banking Company, which eventually was merged with the Canadian Bank of Commerce in 1903. Upon his death, he was acclaimed as the richest man in Canada.

== Privateers ==
He was born to a merchant family in Liverpool, Nova Scotia. Trading and a few privateering voyages to the West Indies on the privateer ship Charles Mary Wentworth in his youth gave him experience to own and manage his own fleet of vessels. While best known for his ownership of the privateer schooner Liverpool Packet, Collins's main fortune was made in shrewd wartime trading and careful peacetime investments.

He moved to Halifax during the War of 1812 and married into the Halifax elite. When the merchant Charles Prescott retired in 1811, Collins purchased Prescott's wharf and warehouse on Upper Water Street in Halifax, later expanding it by purchase and foreclosure to become the headquarters of his commercial empire. During the War of 1812, he was a partner with Joseph Allison in the firm "Collins & Allison" which bought captured American vessels from the prize courts and sold their cargoes at a profit.

== Halifax Banking Company ==
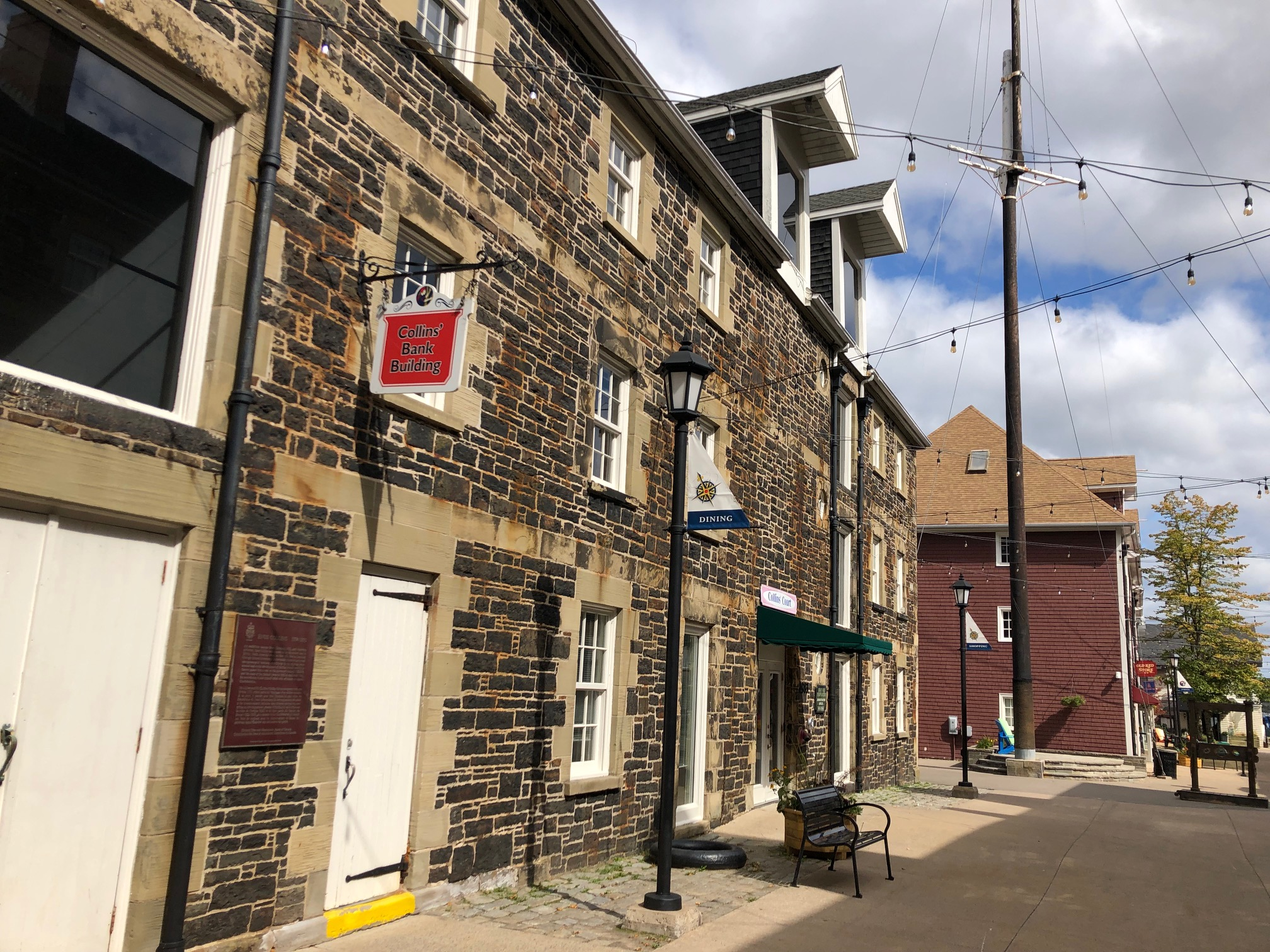
Enos Collins Bank, Historic Properties, Halifax, Nova Scotia

With several other merchants including his partner Joseph Allson, Martin Gay Black and Henry Hezekiah Cogswell, he founded the Halifax Banking Company in present-day Historic Properties (Halifax) (1825). It was one of the first Canadian banks, today known as the Canadian Imperial Bank of Commerce. Collins built a solid granite building for the bank as part of his warehouse complex, a structure which still survives today, bearing the carved title "BANK" above the doorway. He also built a large stone estate house called Gorsebrook in the South End of Halifax.

== Retirement ==
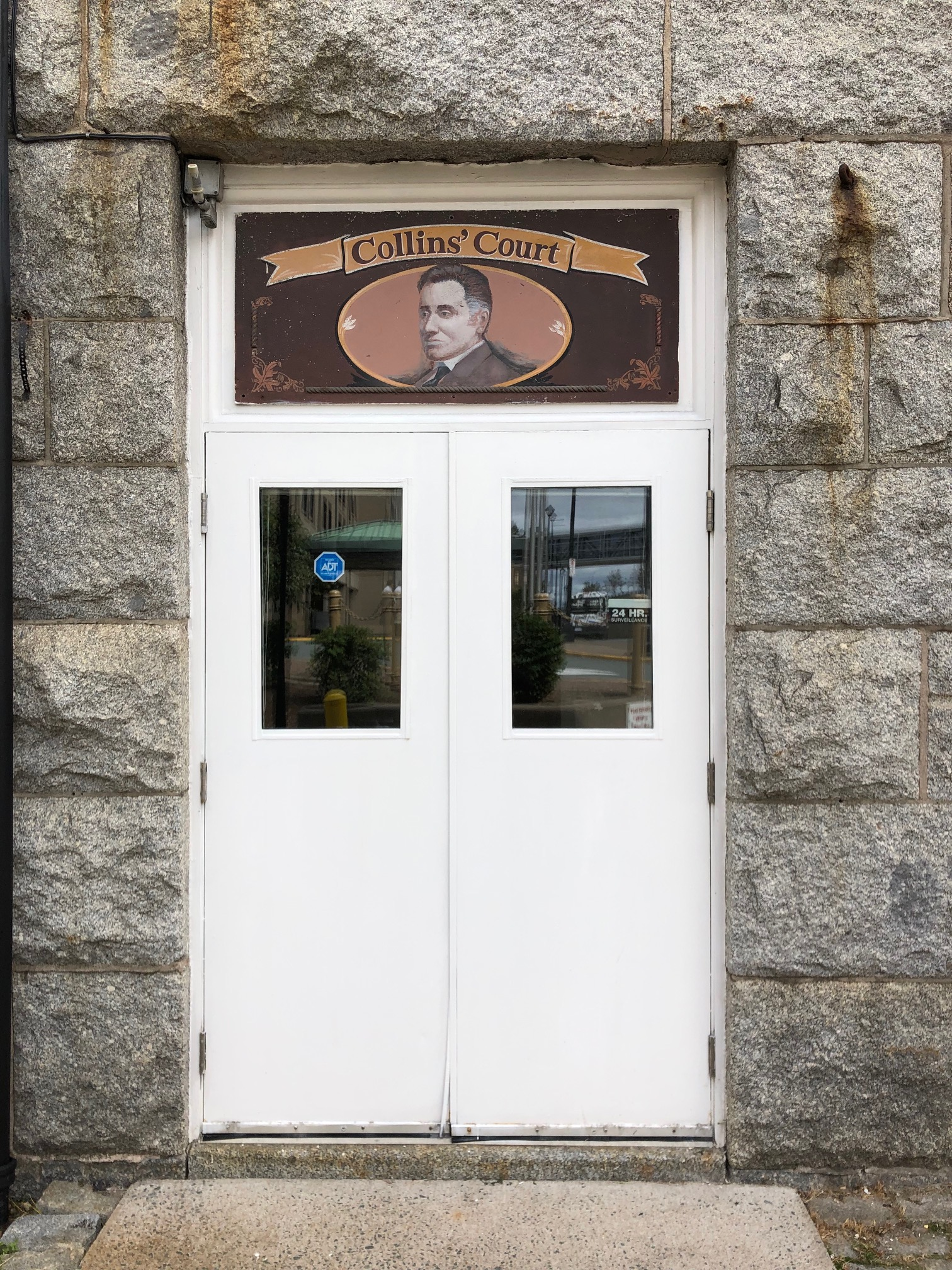
Enos Collins' Court, Historic Properties, Halifax, Nova Scotia

Collins retired from active business and politics in 1840, but continued to manage his large investments and back the Conservative party in Nova Scotia. In 1864, at the age of 90, he came roaring out of retirement to oppose Confederation as a supporter of Joseph Howe's Anti-Confederation Party. Collins died in 1871 with an estate valued at $6 million, reputed to be the largest personal fortune in Canada at the time. He was buried in Camp Hill Cemetery. His "Gorsebrook Estate" is today the site of Saint Mary's University, Halifax, although the university demolished his historic mansion in the 1960s.

== Legacy ==
However, Collins' bank and warehouse buildings on the Halifax waterfront were rescued from demolition by Nova Scotia's Heritage Trust in the 1970s and form the most distinct part of a waterfront revitalization known as Historic Properties. His importance is commemorated on a national historic site plaque mounted on his bank building at Historic Properties.

Collins's reputation as a successful, crafty and sometimes harsh businessman inspired legends which fueled a number of fictional depictions. These include the sinister character "Jonathon Bauer" depicted in Alice Jones' 1903 novel Bubbles We Buy, later retitled A Privateer's Fortune, and the unforgiving "Amos Pride" in Thomas Raddall's 1948 novel Pride's Fancy.

== See also ==
- Letter of marque
- Prize (law)
