= HMS Atalanta (1814) =

History

United States
- Name: Siro
- Builder: William Flanagan, Baltimore
- Launched: 1812
- Captured: January 1814

United Kingdom
- Name: Atalanta
- Acquired: January 1814 by capture
- Fate: Sold 1814

United Kingdom
- Name: Atalanta
- Owner: Bartle & Co.
- Acquired: 1814 by purchase of a prize
- Captured: September 1814

General characteristics
- Tons burthen: 22593/94, or 252 bm
- Length: 99 ft 0 in (30.2 m)
- Beam: 24 ft 1 in (7.3 m)
- Draught: 10 ft 4 in (3.1 m)
- Sail plan: schooner
- Complement: 40
- Armament: Letter of marque: 6 × 12-pounder carronades + 4 × 18-pounder columbiads; At capture: 12 × 9-pounder guns; As British merchantman: 8 guns

HMS Atalanta was the American letter of marque schooner Siro, launched in 1812, that the British captured in 1814. There is no evidence that she actually entered into active service with the Royal Navy. She was a merchant brig when the USS Wasp captured her in September 1814 and sent her into Savannah as a prize, where she was condemned and sold.

== Letter of Marque ==
Siro was built by William Flanagan, reportedly at a cost of US$40,000, and launched in 1812 at Baltimore for her owner George Stiles. She was a relatively expensive vessel, having been made of the finest materials.

On her first trip her captain was Henry Levely. In the autumn of 1812 she was sailing to France when she captured Loyal Sam, of ten guns, which was carrying specie worth US$23,500, and a cargo of indigo. Loyal Sam had been on her way from Nassau for Britain when Siro captured her. Siro sent her prize into Portland, and arrived there herself soon after. However, the British recaptured Loyal Sam. (Note: Actually, the captors were the Nova Scotian privateers Sir John Sherbrooke and Mathilda. At dusk on 16 June 1813 the privateersmen boarded their quarry simultaneously from opposite sides of the vessel and found themselves fighting each other. The Vice admiralty court in Halifax, Nova Scotia, awarded the two privateers a joint capture and £9,424 (one-sixth of the prize's value) as salvage money to share.)

In 1814 Siro was on a voyage under the command of Captain D. Gray and off the coast of Ireland. She was carrying a cargo of cotton to Bordeaux, with the intent to engage in privateering after having landed her cargo.

On 13 January HMS Pelican captured Siro after a chase of 12 hours. She was only about two years old so the Royal Navy took Siro into service as Atalanta, and even though Pelican had to share the prize money with Castilian, Siro proved to be a valuable prize. (Note: A first-class share of the prize money, that is, the share accruing to each of the two British captains, was worth £840 10s 11 3/4d; a sixth-class share, that of an ordinary seaman, was worth £18 14s 6d, or almost a year's wages.) Captain Thomas Mansell described Siro in a letter as being pierced for 16 guns though carrying twelve 9-pounders, and new and a fast sailer. She had apparently already escaped several British cruisers through superior sailing.

== British service ==
The Royal Navy registered Siro as Atalanta, but the prize may have been sold before commissioning her as there appears to be no record of a commissioning.

Her new owners were the Liverpool merchants Berkely (or Barclay), Salkeld & Co., who converted her to a brig. She entered Lloyd's Register (LL), for 1814 with R. Jackson, master, Bartle & Co. owners, and trade Liverpool–Bordeaux.

Her owners had cotton plantations in Pensacola. She sailed from Liverpool on 14 August to Bordeaux. There a French merchant, M. Foussat, chartered her and put aboard a cargo for Pensacola. She was sailing from Bordeaux to Pensacola when captured.

On 21 September 1814 the USS Wasp was about 75 miles east of Madeira when she captured Atalanta, which was described as a British brig of eight guns and 19 men, carrying a commercial cargo. Master Commandant Johnston Blakeley, the captain of Wasp, deemed Atalanta too valuable to destroy. Instead he placed her under the command of Midshipman David Geisinger and sent her home to the United States. She entered Savannah, Georgia, safely on 4 November 1814. She had been bringing back a cargo of brandy, wine, and silk from Bordeaux to Pensacola. In his letter to the Secretary of War, Geisinger describes Atalanta as the former American schooner Siro, which Pelican had captured in the Bay of Biscay. Unfortunately, Blakeley took Atalanta's captain, mate and supercargo, all of whom were lost shortly thereafter when Wasp disappeared at sea.

LR for 1815 carried the annotation "captured" by her name.

The capture gave rise to a case before the Supreme Court of the United States over the status of a cargo owned by a neutral though carried in a vessel belonging to the enemy
