= Brooklyn, Queens County, Nova Scotia =

Community in Nova Scotia, Canada

Coordinates: 44°3′9.43″N 64°41′20.89″W

Brooklyn in Nova Scotia

Brooklyn (2021 population: 849) is a suburban community in the Region of Queens Municipality in Queens County, Nova Scotia, Canada.

Located on the east bank of the Mersey River opposite Liverpool, Brooklyn was originally known as Herring Cove and was the building place of the noted privateer brig Rover. The name Brooklyn was placed on the map in 1907 when the Halifax and Southwestern Railway opened between Yarmouth and Halifax.

In 1929, Bowater Mersey Paper Company Limited opened a large pulp and paper plant in Brooklyn to produce newsprint; until its closure in 2012, it was the area's largest employer. This industrial site has since been redeveloped as a mixed use industrial and commercial facility. As of 2019, the largest firm is Aqualitas, a cannabis cultivation company. Lloyoll Built is a prefabricated and modular home builder.

CN Rail abandoned rail service during the early 1980s, this being the former Halifax and Southwestern Railway. Many of the rail beds have been repurposed as multi-use trails.

Brooklyn native Hank Snow is honoured by the Hank Snow Country Music Centre and co-located Nova Scotia Country Music Hall of Fame which are housed in the restored heritage railway station in neighboring Liverpool.

In 2020, organist Xaver Varnus bought the Pilgrim United Church, which was built in 1895, installed a Casavant Frères concert organ, and re-opened it as his private concert hall.

== Demographics ==
In the 2021 Census of Population conducted by Statistics Canada, Brooklyn had a population of 849 living in 424 of its 449 total private dwellings, a change of −7.3% from its 2016 population of 916. With a land area of 9.44 km^{2} (3.64 sq mi), it had a population density of 89.9/km^{2} (232.9/sq mi) in 2021.

== Recreation ==
The Brooklyn Marina is a recreational facility for sailboats and power boats. It was established in 1995, and is adjacent to the Waterfront Park. It has recently become a centre of local musical entertainment, hosting weekly musical gatherings.

Queens Place Emera Centre is a major, modern recreation centre that serves the entire Regional Municipality of Queens. The NHL-sized ice surface has double-sided permanent seating for 1000 spectators. Queens Place was built along with a large Best Western hotel complex to facilitate large tournaments and thus draw visitors to the area.

Beach Meadows beach is just outside Brooklyn and offers a lengthy stretch of white sand beachfront, protected by Coffin Island which lies approximately 1 km offshore.

The Brooklyn Recreation Committee is a volunteer drive organization composed of residents who maintain the Hank Snow Playground, the Waterfront Park and other green spaces in the village as well as renting out the Brooklyn Community Hall.
