= James Barss =

Nova Scotian politician (1782–1863)

James Barss (1782 – November 24, 1863) was a ship owner, sea captain, merchant and political figure in Nova Scotia. He represented Liverpool township in the Nova Scotia House of Assembly from 1830 to 1836.

He was born in Liverpool, Nova Scotia, probably on February 2, 1783, the son of Joseph Barss and Elizabeth Crowell. In 1806, Barss married Elizabeth Collins. He died in Liverpool.

His brother John also served in the assembly. His brother Joseph was a well-known privateer.
