= Loyal Sam (ship) =

Several vessels have been named Loyal Sam:

- Loyal Sam (1806 ship) was a merchantman launched at Bermuda. She was captured and recaptured in 1812. She also underwent several maritime incidents in 1806, 1821, and 1824. She was wrecked in 1830.
- Loyal Sam (1866) was an iron sailing barque of 460 GRT launched at Sunderland, Tyne and Wear by William Doxford & Sons. In 1880 she was renamed Canopus. She was lost in 1897.
