= Charles Mary Wentworth (1798 ship) =

History

Nova Scotia
- Owner: Simeon Perkins, Snow Parker, William Lawson, Joseph Barss Senior
- Port of registry: Halifax, Nova Scotia
- Builder: Snow Parker
- Launched: June 1798
- Commissioned: May 1798
- Home port: Liverpool, Nova Scotia
- Fate: Sank in West Indies, 1802

General characteristics
- Type: Privateer ship
- Tons burthen: 130 (bm)
- Sail plan: Full-rigged ship
- Crew: 80
- Armament: 16 carriage guns (4 & 6 pounder cannons)

Charles Mary Wentworth was a privateer ship built in 1798, by local investors in Liverpool, Nova Scotia, the first privateer ship from British North America in the Napoleonic Wars. The ship was named after Charles Mary Wentworth, the son of then governor of Nova Scotia, Sir John Wentworth. The ship Charles Mary Wentworth launched privateering in Nova Scotia during the Napoleonic Wars. Her success in capturing 11 valuable ships in her short two-year career led to the commissioning of a dozen other privateer ships from Nova Scotia.

== History ==
Sir John Wentworth was named Lieutenant Governor of Nova Scotia in 1792, after the death of Governor John Parr. Wentworth is called the Loyalist Governor, so his allegiances can be tied to Britain. In 1801, Charles Wentworth was appointed to as a councilor of Halifax. This can be seen by his licensing of over two dozen privateers between the years of 1797 to 1802. Charles Mary Wentworth was licensed for privateering in the spring of 1798, the first British North American privateer to cruise for enemy ships in the French Revolutionary and Napoleonic Wars.

Charles Mary Wentworth was bigger than most colonial privateer schooners, although still a relatively small warship at only 130 tons (BM). However she was heavily armed with 16 carriage guns, carried a crew of 80 men, and provisioned for up to six months of cruising.

Captain Joseph Freeman commanded her on her first cruise; his three officers were Thomas Parker, Joseph Barss Jr., and Enos Collins. Charles Mary Wentworth sailed on 15 August 1798, with a crew of 67 men and four boys. She headed southward to the West Indies pursuing French and Spanish vessels. On this cruise they were able to take two prizes from a Spanish brigantine, Santisima del Carmen. The Spanish brigantine was carrying cocoa, cotton, and sugar when she was captured on 4 September. She arrived in Liverpool on 11 September. The cargo was auctioned off for £7,460 while the ship was auctioned for £871.10. The other prize was the American brig Morning Star, recaptured from the French.

A second cruise began on 3 February 1799. Fly and Victory joined Wentworth to cruise to the West Indies. The Spanish brig Nostra Seignora del Carmen was steered into Liverpool with a cargo valued at over £10,000. The Royal Gazette reported that on 21 May 1799, Wentworth returned to Liverpool with four Spanish vessels following. The Royal Gazette says that the reported prizes were a "brig of 14 guns, and 140 tones of burthen, laden with Wine, Brandy and Flour', a copper-bottomed schooner of 140 tons burthen, mounting 6 guns, laden with Cocoa, a schooner of 60 tons, and another 40 tons, coasters, laden with dry goods and sundry other valuable articles." The value of the cargo was £16,000.

Wentworth's success led within a few months to the commissioning of six other privateer vessels at Liverpool, as well as one from nearby Shelburne, and four more from Halifax, Nova Scotia. Several of these new Nova Scotian privateers were in fact French and Spanish prizes to Wentworth that were now turned against their former owners. Men who first served as officers aboard Wentworth such as Joseph Freeman, Joseph Barss, and Enos Collins would go on to lead many privateers in the War of 1812, aboard such vessels such as the schooner Liverpool Packet.

Charles Mary Wentworth had less success on subsequent voyages. Her owners converted her to an armed merchant ship. She capsized and sank in a South Atlantic storm in 1802, but her crew were rescued with no loss of life.
