= Alexander Godfrey =

British privateer

Alexander Godfrey (c.1756–1803) was an 18th-century British privateer during the War of the Second Coalition against France and Spain.

Godfrey was born in Chatham, Massachusetts in c.1756, and later moved to Nova Scotia. In 1791 he married Phoebe West.

By 1800, Britain was at war with France and Spain, both of which had a significant naval and commercial maritime presence in the Americas. Godfrey obtained a letter of marque to serve as a privateer for Britain, and put to sea in command of Rover, a 14-gun brig. In 1800, while possibly in company with other vessels, Rover encountered and defeated three Spanish warships; in recognition of which Godfrey was offered a Royal Navy commission. Godfrey subsequently paid £850 to purchase one of the Spanish vessels when it was sold as a prize, then sailed it Halifax, Nova Scotia for resale at £1000.

Godfrey died of yellow fever in Jamaica in 1803. His only child Ruth, who died of burns, is buried in Liverpool, Nova Scotia's historic cemetery.
