= Joseph Barss (privateer) =

Canadian sea captain (1776–1824)

Joseph Barss Junior
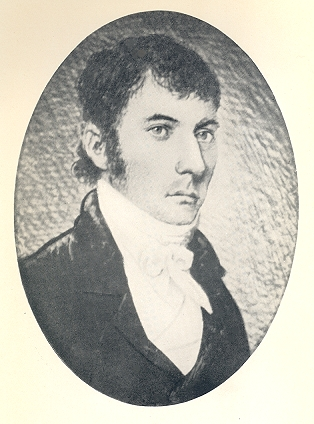
- Joseph Barss (1776 - 1824)
- Born: 21 February 1776; Liverpool, Nova Scotia
- Died: 3 August 1824 (aged 48) near Kentville, Nova Scotia
- Resting place: Kentville, Nova Scotia, Canada; 45°4′39″N 64°29′45″W
- Citizenship: United Kingdom
- Known for: Captain of the Liverpool Packet
- Spouse: Olivia DeWolf
- Parent(s): Joseph Barss Sr. Elizabeth Crowell
- Relatives: John Barss (brother); Elisha DeWolf (father-in-law)

Joseph Barss (21 February 1776 – 3 August 1824) was a sea captain of the schooner Liverpool Packet and was one of the most successful privateers on the North American Atlantic coast during the War of 1812.

== Background ==
Born 21 February 1776 in Liverpool, Nova Scotia to the son of sea captain Joseph Barss Sr. and Elizabeth Crowell. Barss' parents had married in 1773. They were one of the first families to settle in Liverpool, Nova Scotia. Barss was the second of fourteen children. In 1798 the Barss family built one of the largest homes in Liverpool. The house still stands today and is part of the Lane's Privateer Inn.

== Privateer activities ==
Barss gained experience as a privateer against the French in the 1790s, serving in several privateer vessels, as an officer in the ship Charles Mary Wentworth and in command the privateer schooner Lord Spencer. The schooner sank after striking a reef in the West Indies but Barss and his entire crew survived to be rescued by other Nova Scotian privateer vessels. Barss briefly served as commander of the brig Rover, a noted privateer vessel from Liverpool, Nova Scotia famous for its voyages commanded by Alexander Godfrey, another colonial Nova Scotian privateer.

== War of 1812 ==
In 1812, Barss took command of the Liverpool Packet, a captured slave ship originally named the Severn and sometimes nicknamed the Black Joke. Within a year, he had captured at least 33 American vessels. He was known for his excellent use of intelligence on American shipping movement, due in large part to his brother, John Barss. He was also known for his fair treatment of prisoners.

In 1813, following pursuit by the schooner Thomas of Portsmouth, New Hampshire, which ended in a short battle, Barss surrendered the Packet. This defeat brought no embarrassment upon Barss, as the Thomas was over twice the size of the Packet, not only in gross tonnage (143 tons vs. 67 tons) - but in firepower (12 guns vs. 5) and crew (80 vs. 45) as well. After several months of harsh imprisonment Barss was set free, paroled so long as he did not command a privateer vessel. He was briefly captured a second time during the war in command of a merchant vessel.

== Personal life ==
In 1804, he married Olivia DeWolf, the daughter of judge Elisha DeWolf. After the War of 1812, Barss settled near Kentville, Nova Scotia. He had nine children and lived there the rest of his life.

== Death ==
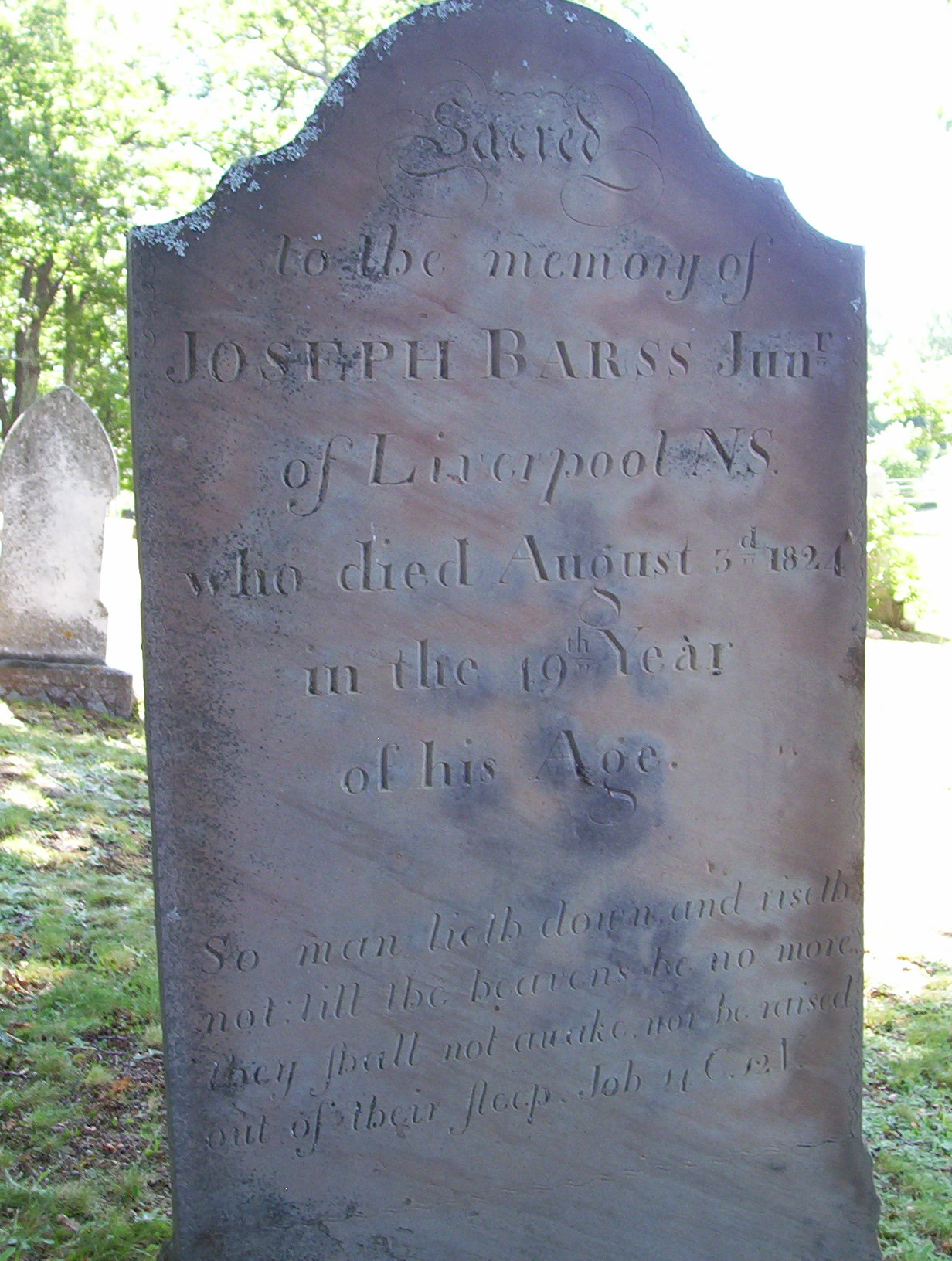
Tombstone of Joeseph Barss at Oak Grove Cemetery in Kentville, Nova Scotia.

Barss died 3 August 1824 near Kentville, Nova Scotia. Barss is buried in the Oak Grove cemetery at Kentville.

== Other ==
The Stan Rogers' song, "Barrett's Privateers" may have taken some inspiration from the exploits of Barss, although the ship described in the popular song bore little resemblance to the sleek, fast lines of the Liverpool Packet and the inept Captain Barrett has no resemblance to the skilled and successful Joseph Barss.

== See also ==
- Sir John Sherbrooke
