= HMS Pelican (1812) =

Brig-sloop of the Royal Navy

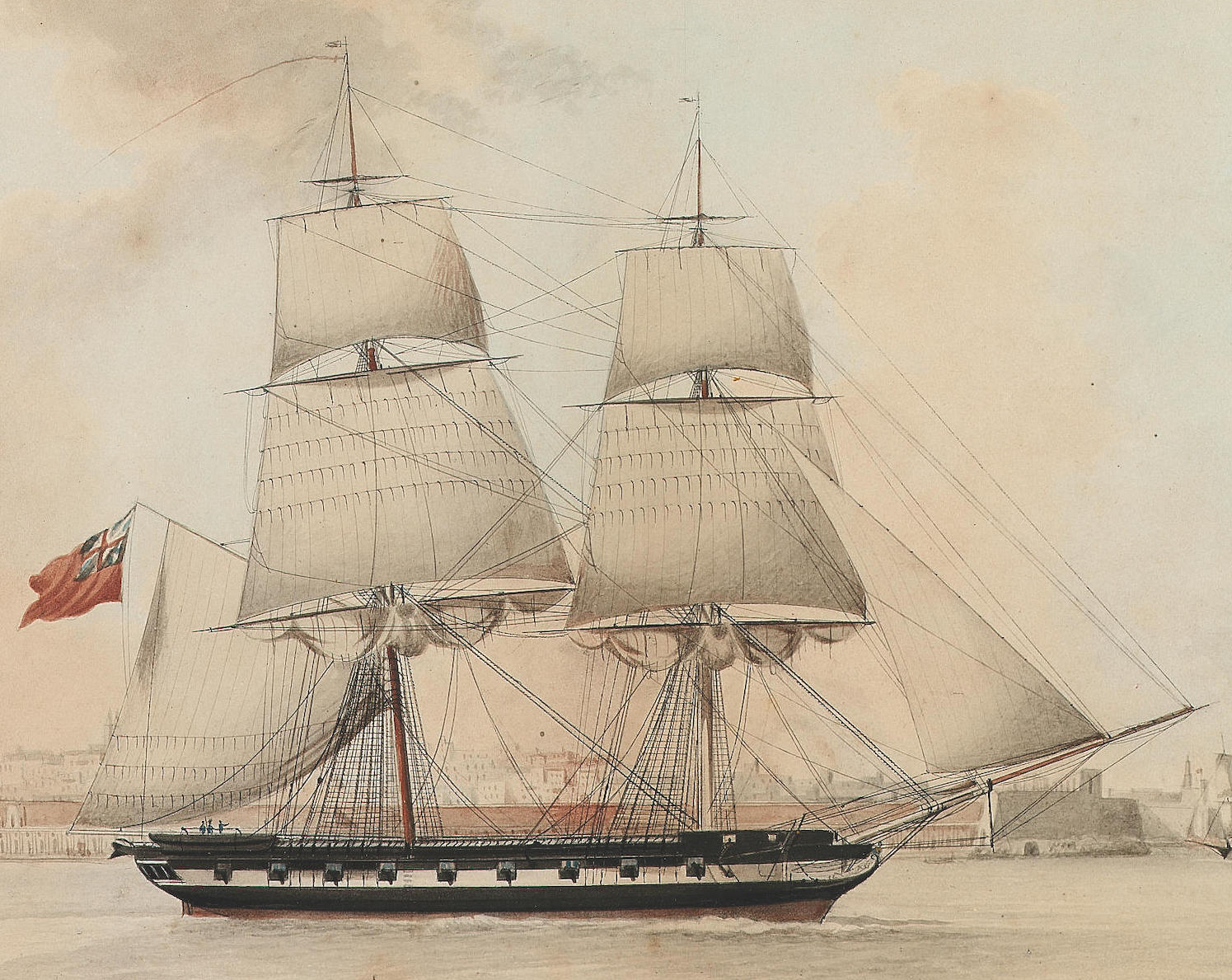
- 1833 painting of Pelican leaving the Grand Harbour

History

United Kingdom
- Name: HMS Pelican
- Builder: Robert Davy, Topsham
- Laid down: January 1812
- Launched: August 1812
- Commissioned: 11 December 1812
- Decommissioned: 1865
- Honours and awards: Naval General Service Medal with clasp "Pelican 14 Augt. 1813"
- Fate: Sold June 1865

General characteristics
- Class & type: 18-gun Cruizer-class brig-sloop
- Tons burthen: 38541/94 (bm)
- Length: 100 ft (30 m) (overall); 77 ft 5 5/8 in (23.612 m) (keel)
- Beam: 30 ft 9 in (9.37 m)
- Draught: 6 ft 6 in (1.98 m) (unladen); 11 ft 1 in (3.38 m) (laden)
- Depth of hold: 12 ft 9 in (3.89 m)
- Propulsion: Sails
- Sail plan: Brig-sloop
- Complement: 121
- Armament: 16 × 32-pounder carronades + 2 × 6-pounder guns

HMS Pelican was an 18-gun Cruizer-class brig-sloop of the Royal Navy, launched in August 1812. She is perhaps best known for her capture in August 1813 of the brig USS Argus. When the navy sold Pelican in 1865 she was the last Cruizer-class vessel still in service.

== War of 1812 ==
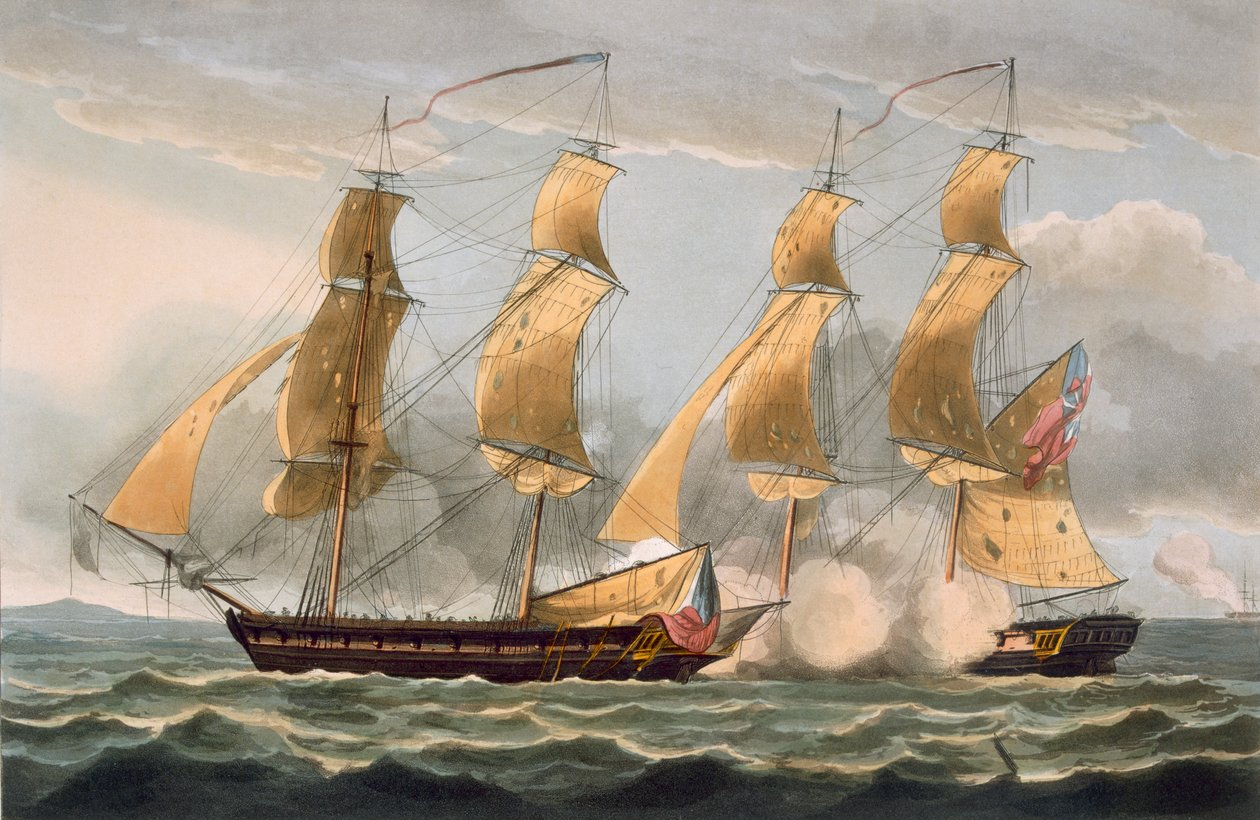
Argus and Pelican

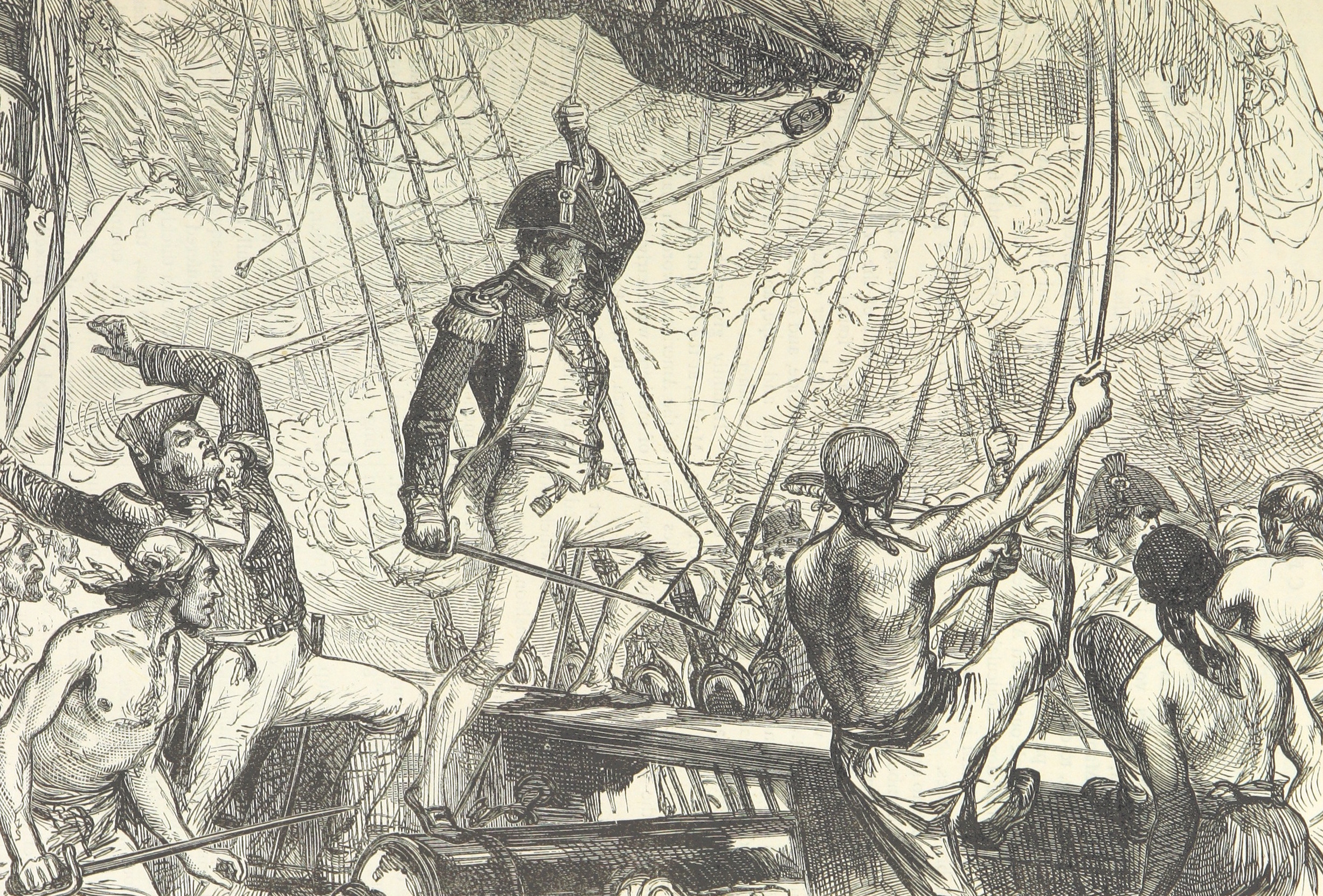
Pelican' crew preparing to board Argus

Pelican was commissioned under Commander John Fordyce Maples on 11 December 1812 for the Irish station. On 5 May 1813 Pelican captured the American schooner Neptune's Barge. Neptune's Barge had been sailing from Connecticut to Santiago de Cuba. Pelican sent her into Jamaica.

Pelican was engaged in convoy escort duty to and from Britain. On 10 August 1813 she arrived in Cork, Ireland, having escorted a convoy from the West Indies. At the time Argus was raiding in British waters and two days later Pelican sailed to join the hunt for the American. On 14 August Pelican engaged Argus off St David's Head on the Pembrokeshire coast. After an engagement lasting 45 minutes Pelican was in a position to board, at which point Argus struck. Pelican had lost two men killed and five wounded; Fordyce estimated American losses as 40 killed and wounded. In 1847 the Admiralty awarded the Naval General Service Medal with clasp "Pelican 14 Augt. 1813" to the four surviving claimants from the action.

Later that month Commander Thomas Mansell replaced Maples. On 13 January 1814 Pelican captured the American privateer Siro (or Sero) after a chase of 12 hours. Siro was a schooner out of Baltimore, armed with 12 guns. She had a crew of 50 men under Captain D. Gray. Captain Thomas Mansell described Siro in a letter as being pierced for 16 guns though carrying twelve 9-pounders, and new and a fast sailer. She was only about two years old so the Royal Navy took Siro into service as Atalanta, and even though Pelican had to share the prize money with Castilian, Siro proved to be a valuable prize. (Note: A first-class share of the prize money, that is, the share accruing to each of the two British captains, was worth £840 10s 11 3/4d; a sixth-class share, that of an ordinary seaman, was worth £18 14s 6d, or almost a year's wages.)

On 26 January Castilian, with Achates in sight, recaptured the Swedish brig Apparencen. Pelican shared the salvage money by agreement with Castilian. Then on 21 March Pelican recaptured Nossa Senhora de Monte and Jupiter. Teazer was in company with Pelican.

Later in 1814, Pelican was in Lisbon. At some point Commander William Bamber replaced Mansell, only to have Commander Thomas Pricket replace him in December.

== Post-war ==
On 8 August 1826 Captain Charles Leonard Irby took command of Pelican while she was fitting out for the Mediterranean station. On 3 January 1827 her boats captured the pirate schooner Aphrodite in the Gulf of Kalamata, near Scardamoula. Aphrodite was armed with four guns and had a crew of 40 men. She was also carrying a large quantity of plundered goods.

Irby wrote to the Greek governor of Maina – Giovanni Mavromicali – instructing him to bring his galliot and an Ionian prize to Zante to have their papers checked. Irby had warned Mavromicali that should the papers not be in order the British would seize both vessels, and should Mavromicali fail to comply, he should send his women and children into the mountains as the Royal Navy would be compelled to destroy his houses. Irby also asked Mavromicalli to surrender two pirates, Niccolo Coccoici and Niccolo Sciutto.

Towards the end of the month, on 28 January, Zebra arrived in Zante on 28 January 1827 carrying dispatches from Capt. Hamilton of Cambrian for Irby. At Zante Williams learned that Mavromicali had failed in his pledge to accede to Irby's instructions. Zebra sailed on 30 January in search of Mavromicali, and on 8 February she captured the galliot.

During a voyage from Hong Kong to Portsmouth, Hampshire, Pelican ran aground on the Peel Bank in the English Channel off the coast of Hampshire on 13 January 1845. She was refloated the next day and taken in to Portsmouth.

== Fate ==
The Admiralty transferred Pelican to the Coast Guard in 1850, and she stayed at Rye, East Sussex until 1865. In Coast Guard service she was renamed CGWV 29 (Coast Guard Watch Vessel). She was sold at Rye to Mr. Fryman on 7 June 1865.
