= John Barss =

Canadian politician

John Barss (14 September 1778 – 12 May 1851) was a Canadian politician. He was a member of the House of Assembly representing Queens County from 1813 to 1820 and 1826 to 1830. He also had the opportunity to serve on the Legislative Council but did not accept. In addition he served as a justice of the peace and as a judge of the Inferior Court of Common Pleas.

He was from large family in Liverpool, Nova Scotia, the son of Joseph Barss and Elizabeth Crowell. His early training was on his father's ships and he became an expert ship's captain with an intimate knowledge of the trade and the seas from Labrador to the West Indies.

Barss's trade involved the usual fare which centred on items such as fish, rum, sugar, lumber, coffee, etc. He lost his ship in 1811 to a French brig in the West Indies and turned to a career as a merchant. During the War of 1812, he was a shareholder in several privateers including one commanded by his brother Joseph. The involvement with privateers was considered acceptable during that time in Nova Scotia history.

His brother James also served in the Nova Scotia assembly.
