= Halifax Banking Company =

First bank in Nova Scotia, Canada

- Founded: 1825
- Founder: James Tobin
- Defunct: 1903
- Fate: Merged into the Canadian Bank of Commerce

The Halifax Banking Company was the first bank in Nova Scotia. Established in 1825, it was unable to obtain a charter from the Nova Scotia Legislative Assembly and operated as a private company. It became incorporated as a chartered bank in 1872 and enjoyed a period of rapid growth and prosperity. The bank was merged with the Canadian Bank of Commerce in 1903.

The banking company was formed by eight prominent citizens of Halifax. They included Martin Gay Black, Henry Hezekiah Cogswell and Enos Collins. Also, according to A History of The Canadian Bank of Commerce, Toronto Oxford University Press, 1920, the list includes: James Tobin, Samuel Cunard, John Clark, William Pryor and Joseph Allison (Collins business partner). Cogswell was the first president, then William Pryor and later Black served in this position as well.
