= Rover (privateering ship) =

Privateer brig in the Napoleonic Wars

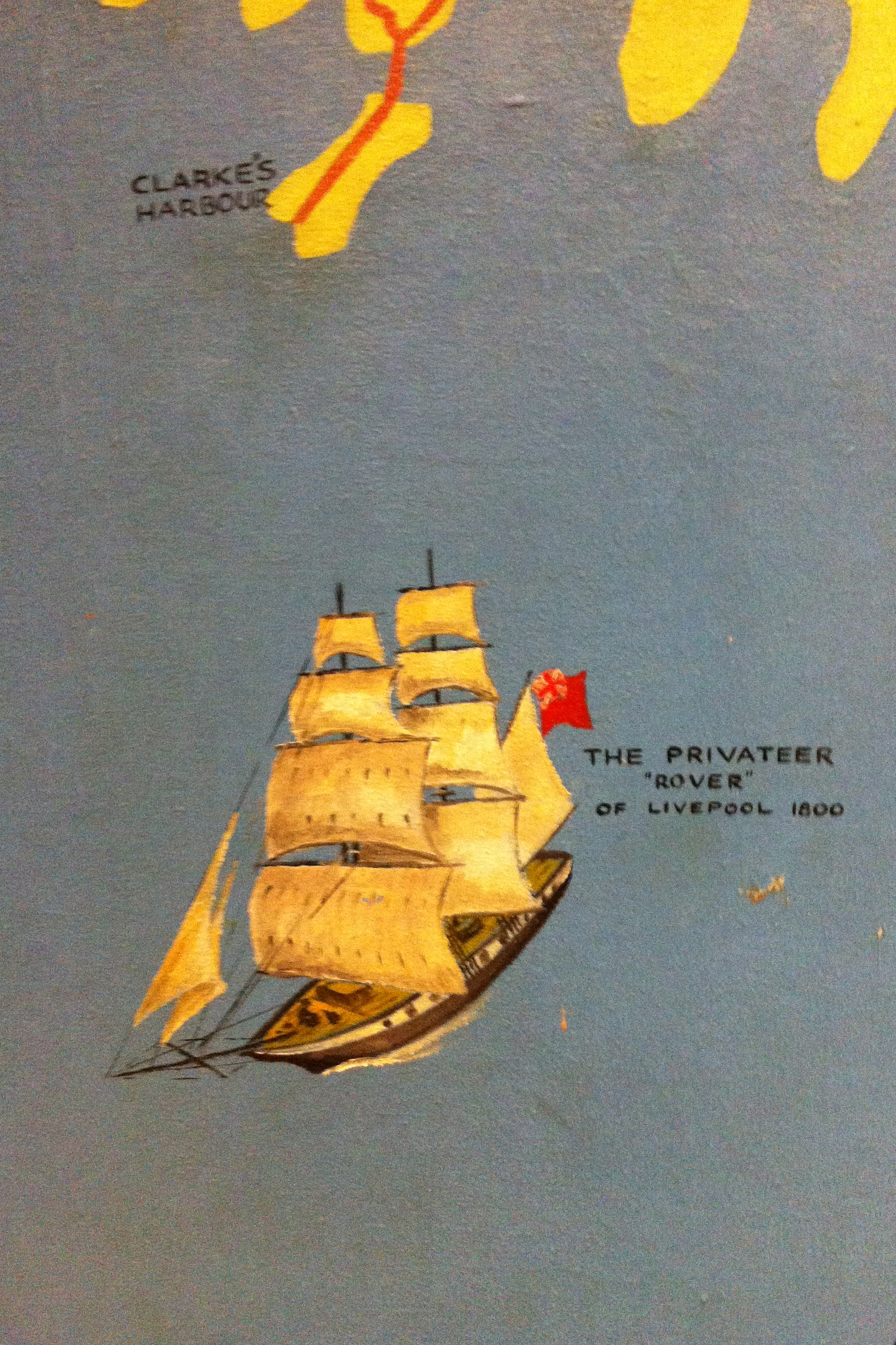
- Privateer Brig Rover

History

Nova Scotia
- Owner: Simeon Perkins, Snow Parker, William Lawson
- Port of registry: Halifax, Nova Scotia
- Builder: Snow Parker
- Launched: April 1800
- Commissioned: 20 May 1800
- Homeport: Liverpool, Nova Scotia
- Fate: Sank in West Indies

General characteristics
- Type: Privateer brig
- Tons burthen: 100 (bm)
- Sail plan: Brig
- Crew: 55
- Armament: 14 × 4-pounder cannons

Rover was a privateer brig out of Liverpool, Nova Scotia, known for several bold battles in the Napoleonic Wars.

She was built in Brooklyn, Nova Scotia (then known as Herring Cove) over the winter of 1799–1800. Rover was owned by a group of merchants from Liverpool, Nova Scotia, led by Simeon Perkins and Snow Parker. Rover's captain was Alexander Godfrey, and she sailed under a letter of marque. Her crew were mainly fishermen.

== Career ==
Rover was built at Brooklyn, Nova Scotia, then called Herring Cove, across the harbour from Liverpool, Nova Scotia. She was one of five privateers commissioned from Liverpool to follow the success of the ship Charles Mary Wentworth. Rover won fame with several bold engagements, including a single handed attack on a French convoy, but she is most famous for a battle off Spanish Main with the Spanish naval schooner Santa Rita, and three accompanying gunboats. On 10 September 1800 on the coast of Venezuela, Rover captured Santa Rita, a schooner fitted out in Puerto Cabello, which had ten 6-pounder guns and two 12-pounder carronades, and having 125 men. Rover did not lose a single man of her crew of 45; Godfrey reported that he had captured 71 men, including the wounded, and that the Santa Rita had lost 54 men killed. The capture made Godfrey a hero in British naval circles. He was celebrated in the British journal, the Naval Chronicle, and offered a commission in the Royal Navy, which he declined. He returned to trading and died a few years later of yellow fever in Jamaica.

Later cruises by Rover were less successful. A subsequent captain, Benjamin Collins, lost his letter of marque and created trouble for Rover's owners with the illegal capture of several merchant vessels.

== Fate ==
After 1803, she was sold to Halifax owners who employed her as a merchant vessel. She later capsized and sank in the West Indies.

== Legacy ==
In the 20th century the Mersey Paper Company in Rover's old home port of Liverpool, Nova Scotia named one of its pulp and paper steamships after the privateer brig. Nova Scotian writer Thomas H. Raddall wrote a history of Rover and based his 1948 novel Pride's Fancy on the brig. The privateer also inspired the "Ballad of the Rover", a song written in the 1920s by Nova Scotian writer Archibald MacMechan.
