= Bowater Mersey Paper Company Limited =

Forestry company operating in Nova Scotia

- Industry: Forestry
- Founded: 1929 as the Mersey Paper Company Limited
- Founder: Izaak Walton Killam
- Owner: Government of Nova Scotia

The Bowater Mersey Paper Company Limited, commonly shortened to Bowater Mersey, is a forestry company operating in the Canadian province of Nova Scotia.

From 1929 until June 2012 Bowater Mersey operated a thermomechanical pulp (TMP) mill and associated paper mill producing newsprint located in Brooklyn, Nova Scotia. Annual production in 2011 was approximately 253,000 t (253,000 t) of newsprint.

Since December 10, 2012 the company has been owned by the Government of Nova Scotia, which is in the process of decommissioning the TMP mill site.

== History ==
The company was founded in 1929 as the Mersey Paper Company Limited by Nova Scotia industrialist Izaak Walton Killam. That year the Mersey Paper Company Ltd opened a pulp mill in Brooklyn on the northern shore of Liverpool Bay, in the estuary of the Mersey River. The mill had its own shipping and receiving pier to accommodate ocean freighters. To power the mill, the company dammed the Mersey approximately 30 km (19 mi) upstream at Indian Gardens, in the process creating a reservoir named Lake Rossignol.

In 1956 the estate of Izaak Walton Killam sold the company to Bowater which renamed the company Bowater Mersey Paper Company Limited in 1959. At the same time, Killam's estate sold the Mersey River generating stations to the then-provincial Crown corporation Nova Scotia Power.

In 1963 the Washington Post Company purchased 49 percent of the common stock of Bowater Mersey Paper Company Ltd., with Bowater retaining the controlling 51 percent ownership.

Changes to the corporate structure and ownership of parent company Bowater saw that company's name evolve to become AbitibiBowater Inc in 2007 and Resolute Forest Products in November 2011.

In October 2011 it was announced by parent company Resolute Forest Products that the Bowater Mersey Paper Company Limited was facing unprecedented production costs and that its operations would be re-evaluated later that fall. The parent company demanded concessions from the union, which were granted in a narrow vote in November 2011. Nova Scotia Power also committed to offer concessions in the form of discounted power rates and other incentives.

On June 15, 2012, the parent company Resolute Forest Products announced that the mill would be idling its Bowater Mersey Paper Company Ltd. mill indefinitely, effective with the end of the last shift on June 16. Resolute Forest Products also indicated that it would be selling its assets in Nova Scotia, including the idled mill, its timber lands, and the Brooklyn Power Corporation.

On December 10, 2012, it was announced that the Government of Nova Scotia had purchased all shares in the Bowater Mersey Paper Company Ltd. for $1.00 CAD from owners Resolute Forest Products Inc. and The Washington Post Company. This deal saw the provincial government acquire all Bowater Mersey assets and liabilities, except for a sawmill in Oakhill, Lunenburg County. The assets of Bowater Mersey transferred to the provincial government include 555,000 acres (225,000 ha) of forest land, the pulp mill and paper mill in Brooklyn, a deep water marine terminal at Brooklyn, and the Brooklyn Power Corporation biomass electrical generating plant. Liabilities include a $20 million debt to Resolute Forest Products Inc., a $120 million pension liability for workers in the woodland and pulp mill operations, and environmental liabilities for the pulp mill site. The provincial government announced that it had reached a simultaneous agreement with Nova Scotia Power Corporation to sell Brooklyn Power Corporation for $25 million. On December 11, 2012, the provincial government announced that the TMP mill in Brooklyn would be decommissioned and the site become the site of a forest industry research facility with a focus on biomass energy.

== Shipping fleet ==
The year after the mill began production in 1929, Mersey Paper Company Ltd founded Mersey Shipping Company Limited in 1930 which was renamed to Markland Shipping Company Limited in 1937 and Bowater Steamship Company of Canada Limited in 1959. Its ships carried pulp wood and paper products for the Brooklyn mill and other shippers.
