= Loyal Sam (1806 ship) =

History

United Kingdom
- Name: Loyal Sam
- Builder: Bermuda
- Launched: 1806
- Fate: Lost 1830

General characteristics
- Tons burthen: 234, or 239, or 247, or 255 (bm)
- Notes: Bermuda cedar

Loyal Sam was a merchantman launched at Bermuda in 1806. She was captured and recaptured in 1812. She also underwent several maritime incidents in 1806, 1821, and 1824. She was wrecked in 1830.

== Career ==
Loyal Sam arrived at Portsmouth on 24 April 1806. She first appeared in Lloyd's Register (LR) in 1806, with Leberg, master, Wood, owner, and trade London–Bermuda. She left for Bermuda on 9 September.

She almost immediately suffered a misfortune. On 17 December 1806, a gale drove her on shore at Bermuda as she arrived there from London. Most of her cargo was aboard.

On 10 October 1808, Loyal Sam was at Greenock when a gale caused Ann to run afoul of Loyal Sam. Loyal Sam lost her starboard rails to the accident.

On 1 February 1810, Atlantic, Smith, master, foundered at sea as she was sailing from Portsmouth, New Hampshire, to the West Indies. Loyal Sam rescued the crew and brought them into Liverpool.

In the autumn of 1812, the American letter of marque Siro, Captain Henry Levely, was sailing to France on her first voyage when she captured Loyal Sam, of ten guns, which was carrying specie worth US$23,500, and a cargo of indigo. Loyal Sam had been on her way from Nassau for Britain when Siro captured her. (Note: The news item in Lloyd's List does not give the name of Loyal Sam's captor, and states that she was sailing from New Providence when she was captured.) Siro sent her prize into Portland. Siro arrived at Portland shortly after she had dispatched Loyal Sam.

However, the Nova Scotian privateers Sir John Sherbrooke and Mathilda recaptured Loyal Sam, J.McIntire, master. At dusk on 16 June 1813, the privateersmen boarded their quarry simultaneously from opposite sides of the vessel and found themselves fighting each other. The Vice admiralty court in Halifax, Nova Scotia awarded the two privateers a joint capture and £9,424 (one-sixth of the prize's value), as salvage money to share.

On 18 July 1814, Loyal Sam spoke with Lucy, Davidson, master, at 44°23′N 45°26′W. Lucy had left Liverpool on 15 June, for Savannah. Loyal Sam arrived in the Clyde on 10 August; Lucy had not been heard from after Loyal Sam had spoken with her.

On 26 May 1818, Loyal Sam, Middleton, master, put into Portland, having lost her bowsprit and other rigging. She had been sailing from Sligo to St Andrews.

Loyal Sam, Kerr, master, of Belfast, was driven ashore at Munn's Cove, Diamond Harbour, Quebec. She was to be sold on 20 October 1821.

A letter dated Quebec, 22 November 1821, reported that Loyal Sam would winter over there. Loyal Sam was registered in Quebec in 1822. She transferred her registry back to Liverpool on 4 July 1823.

On 8 January 1824, Loyal Sam grounded on the North Bank at Liverpool but was gotten off and brought into the dock to repair. She had been on her way to Bahia.

Year	Master	Owner	Trade	Source & notes
1825	A.Petrie	Mather	Liverpool–Newfoundland	LR; repairs 1822, and damages repaired 1824
1830	J.Nickels	Captain & Co.	Liverpool–Bahia	LR; repairs 1822, and damages repaired 1824

== Fate ==
On 3 June 1828, Lloyd's List reported that Loyal Sam had arrived back at Liverpool from Macaio, which is about 200 miles NNE from Salvador, Bahia. Then on 15 and 16 April 1830, The Standard and Lloyd's List reported that Loyal Sam, Nickels, master, had been totally lost at Macaio.
