= Martin Gay Black =

Martin Gay Black (19 November 1786 – 26 October 1861) was the son of William Black, who was the founder of the Methodist congregation in Nova Scotia.

Martin Black was raised in a home dedicated to the evangelical religious practices of Methodism. He became a successful businessman and moved into banking. He was a founding partner of the Halifax Banking Company and eventually its president. He was a powerful and distinguished member of the community and also furthered the influence of the Methodist movement in Nova Scotia.
