= Joseph Barss (politician) =

Canadian politician

Joseph Barss (1750 – August 13, 1826) was a mariner, merchant and political figure in Nova Scotia. He represented Liverpool Township in the Nova Scotia House of Assembly from 1799 to 1811.

He was the son of Joseph Barss and Lydia Dean and came to Liverpool, Nova Scotia from New England in 1761. In 1773, he married Elizabeth Crowell. Barss was a justice of the peace and judge in the Inferior Court of Common Pleas. He died in Liverpool.

His son Joseph was a well-known privateer and his sons John and James served as a member of the provincial assembly.
