= Susan Buggey =

Canadian landscape historian

Susan Buggey (April 26, 1941 – April 16, 2015) was a Canadian landscape historian. Her contributions to the fields of cultural landscape history and architecture in Canada were recognized by the Canadian Society of Landscape Architects in 2014 when she was named an honorary member of the society.

Buggey was born and raised in Winnipeg, Manitoba. After graduating from United College in 1962, she completed a certificate in education at the University of Manitoba (1963) and later obtained an MA in History from Dalhousie University (1981).

After working as a historical researcher for the National Museums of Canada, Buggey spent 27 years with Parks Canada. She joined the department's National Historic Parks and Sites Branch in 1970 and was named Parks Canada's Chief of Historical Research two years later. She retired from the department in 1997. In addition to her work with Parks Canada, Buggey taught courses about landscape history at the University of Manitoba, the Université de Montréal, and the University of Victoria.

As a public servant, Buggey contributed to the identification and recognition of national historic sites in Canada through advisement to the Historic Sties and Monuments Board of Canada. Buggey's work in landscape heritage led to her involvement with the development of UNESCO's inclusion of cultural landscapes on the World Heritage List. In 2003, Buggey worked with conservationist Jim Thorsell to create a short list of Canadian sites to be considered as UNESCO heritage sties.

Buggey died at the Ottawa General Hospital April 16, 2015.
