= Sir John Sherbrooke (Halifax) =

Nova Scotia privateer burned in 1814

History

Nova Scotia
- Name: Sir John Sherbrooke
- Namesake: John Coape Sherbrooke
- Owner: Joseph Freeman, Enos Collins, John Barss, Joseph. Barss, Benjamin Knaut
- Port of registry: Halifax, Nova Scotia
- Commissioned: 11 February 1813
- Honours and awards: 18 captures
- Fate: Captured and burned 1814

General characteristics
- Type: Privateer Brig
- Tons burthen: 277, or 278 bm
- Sail plan: brig
- Crew: 150; reduced to 40 men when engaged in mercantile trade
- Armament: Privateer:18 × 9-pounder cannons; 1814:8 × 9-pounder cannons

Sir John Sherbrooke was a successful and famous Nova Scotian privateer brig during the War of 1812, the largest privateer from Atlantic Canada during the war. In addition to preying on American merchant ships (she captured 18 between her commissioning on 11 February 1813 and her conversion to a merchant vessel in 1814), she also defended Nova Scotian waters during the war. After her conversion to a merchantman she fell prey to an American privateer in 1814. She was burnt to prevent her reuse.

== Origins ==
She was originally the American privateer brig Thorn, Asa Hooper master, and was armed with eighteen long 9-pounder guns. Thorn was from Marblehead, Massachusetts, and she was on her first cruise when the British captured her. (Note: She had sailed with 140 men but had put prize crews aboard two prizes so only 124 remained.) At the time of her capture she had already taken as prizes the brig Freedom, loaded with salt, and the American vessel Hiram, with a cargo of flour and bread on a voyage to Lisbon and traveling with a British license (safe conduct pass) that asked all British naval vessels and privateers to let her pass, provided that she was on a bona fide passage to Spain or Portugal with flour. This capture, on 15 October, gave rise to a US Supreme Court court case in which the court ruled that Hiram, although an American vessel, was a legitimate prize. (Note: THE HIRAM, 12 U. S. 444 (1814)) The British naval vessels Tenedos, Shannon, Nymphe and Curlew captured Thorn on 31 October 1812. Thorn was sold at Halifax as a prize and renamed after the former colonial administrator Sir John Coape Sherbrooke.

== Privateer ==
She had three letters of marque issued to her: 27 November 1812 (Captain Thomas Robson); 15 February 1813 (Captain Joseph Freeman); and 27 August 1814 (Captain Wm Corken). Sir John Sherbrooke's primary captain was Joseph Freeman, an experienced privateer officer from Liverpool, Nova Scotia, who was a veteran who did everything in navy fashion. (Freeman was eventually buried in the Old Burying Ground (Halifax, Nova Scotia)). Freeman co-operated with the navy, which treated him with the same respect as a naval officer.

On 7 April Betsey, which had been sailing from Newport to Havana, arrived at Halifax, a prize to Sir John Sherbrooke.

On 19 May Sir John Sherbrooke recaptured the brig Paragon, of 213 tons (bm), J. Gorden, master, which an American privateer had captured as Paragon was sailing from Aberdeen to New Brunswick. Paragon arrived at Halifax on 24 May. The records of the Vice admiralty court give the name of Paragon's master as "J. Gardner".

Sir John Sherbrooke also sent into Halifax Columbia, which had been sailing from Savannah. Sir John Sherbrooke had captured Columbia, a brig of 98 tons (bm), S.Holland, master, on 15 May. Columbia had been sailing from Savannah to Boston with a cargo of 173 bales of cotton and a quantity of reeds.

On 24 May San Gabriel arrived at Halifax. She had been sailing from Havana to New York when the American privateer Alexander had captured her. Sir John Sherbrooke recaptured San Gabriel on 19 May and sent her into Halifax. The Vice admiralty court restored San Gabriel, A. Drummond, master, to her owners.

On 18 December 1813, the prize agents advertised the distribution of prize money for the following captures:

- Sloops Red Bird, Apollo, Betsey, and Fame
- Brig Columbia
- Schooners Mary, Paulina, and Caroline
- Privateer schooner Governor Plummer, of six guns and a crew of 100 men.

as well as salvage for the recapture of the ship Loyal Sam, brig Paragon, and sloop General Hodgson.

Next, Sir John Sherbrooke sailed in company with Rattler and the schooner Bream. Together the three captured 11 American vessels between 7 and 9 April.

Sir John Sherbrooke provided reinforcements for Shannon prior to her famous victory over the USS Chesapeake, although Sir John Sherbrooke was not present at the battle. Sir John Sherbrooke had gathered 50 Irish labourers when on 26 May 1813 she recaptured Duck, which was transporting them from Waterford to Newfoundland. Duck had been the prize of the American privateer General Plummer, which Sir John Sherbrooke had captured two days later. Twenty-two of the laborers agreed to transfer from Sir John Sherbrooke to Shannon.

Sir John Sherbrooke also began the chase of the notorious American privateer schooner Young Teazer, which British naval ships, including Hogue and Orpheus then took up. The chase ended with Young Teazer's destruction at the hands of a member of her own crew who feared capture because he had violated his parole resulting from a previous capture.

== Merchantman ==
Far larger than most colonial privateers, Sir John Sherbrooke required a constant supply of American captures to pay for her large crew. Following the destruction of most American shipping during the war, Sir John Sherbrooke became unprofitable to operate as a privateer and her owners sold her in 1814. Her new owners then employed her as a merchant ship.

Lloyd's Register (LR) for 1815 showed her with J. Duncan, master, Ewing & Co., owners, and trade Greenock–Newfoundland. The entry carried the annotation that she had been captured in 1814.

== Fate ==
In the autumn of 1814 Sir John Sherbrooke was outward bound from Halifax with a cargo of oil and dried fish. She encountered the American privateer Syren, which captured her and put a prize crew aboard her. Lloyd's List (LL) reported on 21 October 1814 that Sir John Sherbrooke, Lester, master, was one of four merchantmen that American privateers had captured. (The other three were James, McNeil, master, Emulation, and Swiftsure, Lester, master. Their crews were landed at Viana.)

However, a British squadron came along and chased the captured Sir John Sherbrooke ashore. The American prize crew managed to get away with all the valuables on board despite the fire of the British frigate's guns. The frigate sent her boats to attempt a recovery, but gunfire from a nearby fort drove them off. Salvage was impracticable, so the cutting-out party from the frigate set Sir John Sherbrooke on fire; she then burned to the water's edge.

On 16 November 1814, boats from HMS Spencer and Telegraph, herself a former American privateer, ran Syren ashore under Cape May, where her crew destroyed her.

== Other information ==
Sir John Sherbrooke was not as famous as her smaller and more successful counterpart, the schooner Liverpool Packet. However some believe that Sir John Sherbrooke inspired the line "I wish I was in Sherbrooke now", from the Stan Rogers song "Barrett's Privateers", because the town of Sherbrooke, Nova Scotia did not yet exist, as the song takes place in 1778. The Sherbrooke also significantly postdates the American Revolution as it was commissioned only two years before the town, a full 35 years after the song's setting.
