= Joseph Barss (ice hockey) =

Ice hockey player and coach (1892–1971)

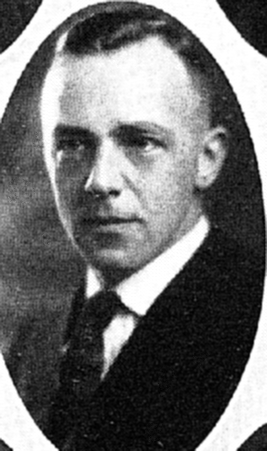
- Barss from 1924 Michiganensian
- Born: Joseph Barss; February 27, 1892; Madras, British India
- Died: January 26, 1971 (aged 78); Fort Lauderdale, Florida, United States
- Occupations: Ice hockey coach, Medical doctor and surgeon

Joseph Ernest Barss (February 27, 1892 – January 26, 1971) was an ice hockey player and coach. He was the first head coach of the Michigan Wolverines men's ice hockey team, holding the position from 1922 to 1927. He was later employed as a medical doctor and surgeon in the Chicago area.

== Early years ==
Barss was born in Madras, India (now known as Chennai) in February 1892. His father, John Howard Barss (born Wolfville, Nova Scotia) was ordained in July 1891 and traveled to India as a Baptist missionary. In 1893, while still an infant, Barss returned to Canada with his parents. He traveled with his parents from Liverpool, England, arriving in New York on October 30, 1893. They returned to their home in Wolfville, Nova Scotia, where Barss' father operated a grocery store and served as a Baptist minister. Barss was enrolled at Acadia University in Wolfville, receiving his degree in 1912. After graduating from Acadia, Barss played professional hockey for the Montreal Wanderers of the National Hockey Association.

== World War I ==
Barss in World War I uniform posing with his parents.

In April 1915, Barss entered the Canadian Over-Seas Expeditionary Force following the outbreak of World War I. At that time, he listed his occupation as clerk and indicated that he had three years of prior military service. In his history of the University of Michigan's hockey program, author John U. Bacon provides a lengthy account of Barss' war-time service and its impact on his decision to become a medical doctor. According to Bacon, Barss was wounded by shrapnel and gassed at the Second Battle of Ypres in April and May 1915. However, Barss' military records indicate that Barss' Attestation Paper for the Canadian Over-Seas Expeditionary Force was completed on April 30, 1915 in Montreal. Accordingly, it appears that Barss likely did not see combat action at the Second Battle of Ypres. Barss' Service Record states that he was wounded on June 2, 1916. He was a machine gunner sergeant with the P.P.C.L.I and badly wounded in Sanctuary Wood during the first day of the Battle of Mt. Sorrel on the eastern border of Ypres, Belgium. According to Bacon, Barss suffered permanent lung damage and a severe abdominal injury from shrapnel while serving in Belgium. After a lengthy hospitalization in France, Barss was sent to Camp Hill Hospital in Halifax, Nova Scotia in November 1917. Barss arrived in Halifax weeks before the Halifax Explosion, an explosion of a ship in Halifax harbor loaded with 10 tons of gunpowder, 35 tons of airplane fuel and 200 tons of TNT. More than 1,700 people were killed in the explosion. Barss was not injured and helped tend to the injured in the aftermath of the disaster.

== University of Michigan ==
In 1919, Barss enrolled at the University of Michigan as a graduate student in bacteriology. In 1920, he enrolled at the Medical School, receiving a medical degree from the university in 1924.

While attending medical school at Michigan, Barss also served as the first coach of the Michigan Wolverines men's ice hockey team. According to Wilfred Byron Shaw's four-volume history of the University of Michigan, hockey had its beginning at Michigan in 1921 with Barss as the coach. Other sources indicate that Barss became the coach of the Michigan hockey team in 1922. According to Bacon, Barss officiated many of the games for the 1922 team and then asked athletic director Fielding H. Yost if he could start a varsity hockey team. Bacon wrote that Yost "might not have known much about hockey, but he knew a natural coach when he met one" and accepted Barss' offer.

It was not until 1923 that the Michigan hockey team received formal recognition as a varsity sport. The first "official" college hockey game played west of the Alleghenies was a game between Michigan and Wisconsin, played on January 12, 1923, in Ann Arbor, Michigan. The game went into overtime with Michigan prevailing by a score of 2-1.

Barss coached the Michigan Wolverines men's ice hockey team during its first five years as a formal varsity sport. During those five years (1923 to 1927), the Michigan hockey team compiled a record of 26-21-4.

As the popularity of college hockey grew in the early 1920s, other colleges looked to Barss' pupils for coaching candidates. In January 1923, former Michigan hockey star Russell Barkell was hired as the coach of the hockey team at Williams College.

In February 1924, after a 3-0 victory by Michigan over Wisconsin, a Madison newspaper praised the defensive play of the Barss-coached Wolverines: "With an almost air-tight defense and a definite scoring attack the Michigan hockey team defeated the Badger six by a score of 3 to 0 yesterday afternoon. Wisconsin could not stop Michigan's fast team work and was unable to penetrate their defense to take any close shots at the goal."

By January 1925, the Michigan ice hockey team had four returning letter men from the prior year's team, and a call for candidates by Coach Barss "brought out 20 aspirants."

== Medical career ==
After retiring as Michigan's hockey coach in 1927, Barss moved to Riverside, Illinois. He worked at the Hines Veteran Hospital in Maywood, Illinois, eventually becoming the chief of surgery there. In June 1930, Barss became a naturalized United States citizen. That same year, U.S. Census records show that Barss was living in Riverside, Illinois with his wife, Helen Kolb Barss, and two children, Joseph (age 6) and Elizabeth (age 2). In his registration card for the draft at the time of World War II, Barss indicated that he was a physician and surgeon residing in Riverside and having his place of business at 1011 Lake Street in Oak Park, Illinois.

== Later years and death ==
Barss retired from his medical practice in 1962 and moved to Florida. In 1971, Barss died of Alzheimer's disease in Fort Lauderdale, Florida at age 79.

== College Coaching Record ==
Record table
Season	Team	Overall	Conference	Standing	Postseason
Michigan Wolverines Independent (1922–1927)
1922–23	Michigan	4–7–0			
1923–24	Michigan	6–4–1			
1924–25	Michigan	4–1–1			West Intercollegiate Champion
1925–26	Michigan	3–5–2			
1926–27	Michigan	9–4–0			
Michigan:		26–21–4			
Total:		26–21–4			
National champion Postseason invitational champion Conference regular season champion Conference regular season and conference tournament champion Division regular season champion Division regular season and conference tournament champion Conference tournament champion
