= Beach Meadows, Nova Scotia =

Community in Nova Scotia, Canada

Coordinates: 44°3′51.4″N 64°38′17.64″W

Beach Meadows in Nova Scotia

Beach Meadows is a community in the Canadian province of Nova Scotia, located in the Region of Queens Municipality. It is the site of Beach Meadows Beach Park.

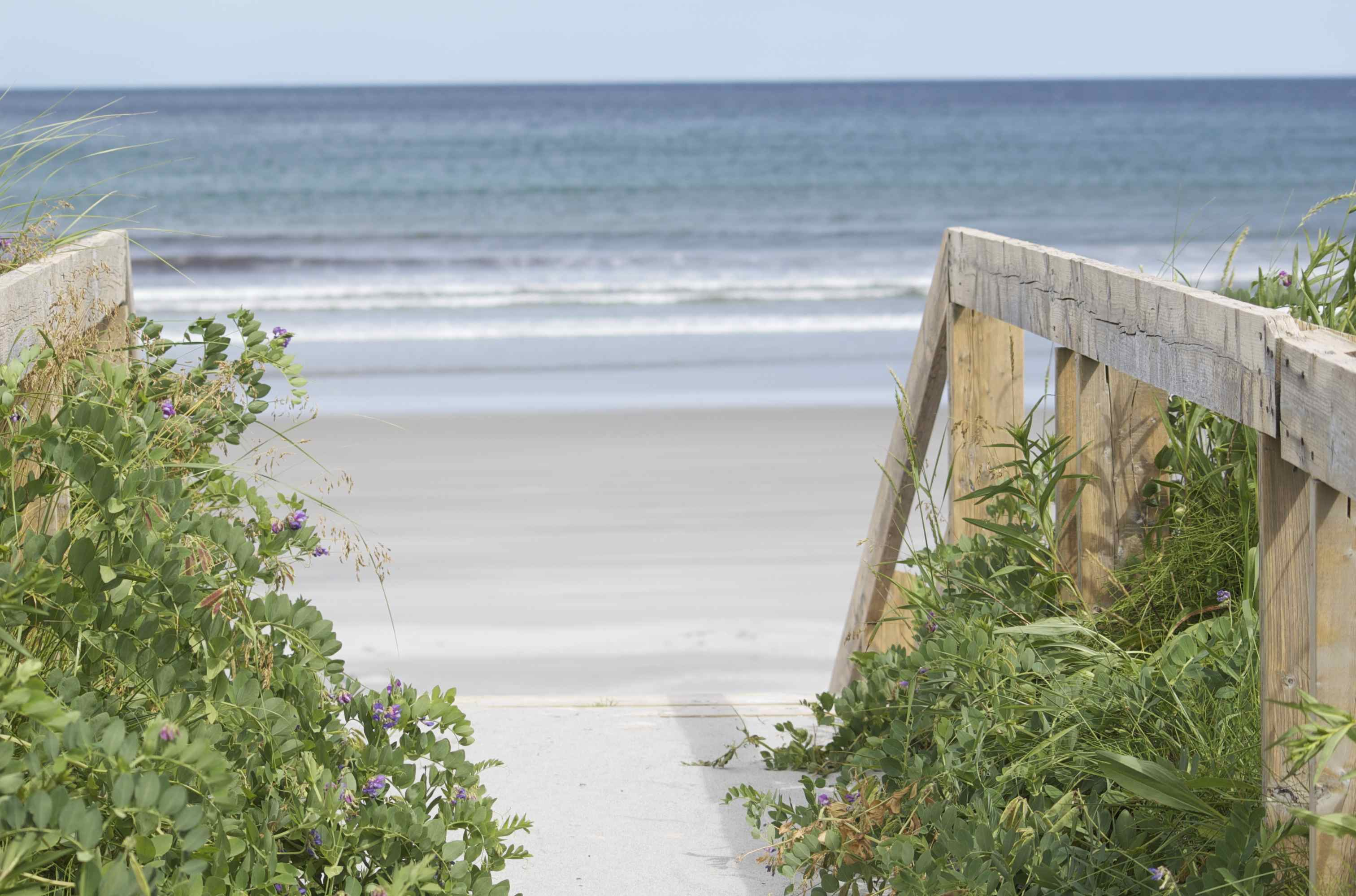
Beach Meadows Beach Park boardwalk.
