= Liverpool Packet =

Privateer schooner

History

Nova Scotia
- Name: Liverpool Packet
- Owner: Enos Collins, John Allison, Joseph Barss
- Port of registry: Halifax, Nova Scotia
- Commissioned: 20 August 1812
- Home port: Liverpool, Nova Scotia
- Nickname(s): "Black Joke"; "New England's Bane"
- Honours and awards: 50 captures
- Fate: Sold to Jamaican owners after 1816

General characteristics
- Type: Privateer schooner
- Tons burthen: 55, or 67 (bm)
- Sail plan: Topsail schooner
- Crew: 40
- Armament: Severn:2 × 1-pounder guns; Liverpool Packet:2 × 4-pounder guns + 2 × 12-pounder carronades + 1 × 6-pounder gun

Liverpool Packet was originally the American slave ship Severn, built at Baltimore and captured in 1811. She was sold in Halifax as a schooner from Liverpool, Nova Scotia, carrying mail and passengers. After the United States declared war, she was pressed into service as a privateer which captured 50 American vessels in the War of 1812. American privateers captured Liverpool Packet in 1813, but she failed to take any prizes during the four months before she was recaptured. She was repurchased by her original Nova Scotia owners and returned to raiding American commerce. Liverpool Packet was the most successful privateer vessel ever to sail out of a Canadian port.

== Canadian privateer ==
Liverpool Packet was built at Baltimore and rigged as a Baltimore Clipper style schooner. HMS Tartarus captured the schooner in August 1811. The Halifax Vice Admiralty Court, under Chief Justice Alexander Croke, condemned Severn as an illegal slave ship as both Britain and the United States had recently outlawed the Transatlantic Slave Trade. The court then ordered her sold at auction and Enos Collins and other investors purchased her in October 1811. They renamed her Liverpool Packet, although she sometimes bore the nickname Black Joke, the name of several 18th-century slave ships. At first her owners used the small and fast schooner as a packet ship carrying mail and passengers between Halifax and Liverpool, Nova Scotia. (Note: The privateer schooner Liverpool Packet should not be confused with several larger ships described as or named the Liverpool Packet that operated out of Liverpool, England, carrying mail and passengers on the route.)

== War of 1812 ==
Upon the outbreak of the War of 1812, the owners of Liverpool Packet quickly converted her to a privateer. Under the command of Joseph Barss Jnr, she captured at least 33 American vessels during the first year of the war. His strategy was to lie in wait off Cape Cod, snapping up American ships headed to Boston or New York.

=== Captive ===
She was a menace to New England shipping until the Americans captured her in 1813. On 10 June the privateer schooner Thomas of Portsmouth, New Hampshire, Captain Shaw, master, mounting twelve guns and manned with a crew of one hundred men, encountered Packet. Thomas chased her for about five hours but light winds prevented Liverpool Packet from escaping.

Liverpool Packet struck her colours but then as the Americans came alongside the two vessels ran into each other. As the British ran up to push the vessels apart, the Americans, fearing they were going to be boarded, boarded Liverpool Packet. Firing broke out that killed three Americans. American anger over their earlier losses to the Packet resulted in poor treatment of Barss, who languished in jail for months on a diet of bread and water until he was exchanged for American prisoners held in Halifax.

In American hands she was briefly renamed Young Teaser's Ghost, after the recently destroyed American privateer Young Teazer. Failing to take any British prizes, she was renamed again as Portsmouth Packet. Under this name and under the command of Captain John Perkins, she had a short, unsuccessful career failing to capture a single prize for the Americans.

=== Recaptured ===
On 5 October 1813, HMS Fantome and HMS Epervier recaptured Liverpool Packet, then sailing under the name Portsmouth Packet, off Mount Desert Island, Maine, after a chase of thirteen hours. At the time, the privateer schooner was armed with five guns, carried a crew of 45, and had sailed from Portsmouth the previous day.

The recaptured schooner was brought into Halifax where her original owners repurchased her and restored the name of Liverpool Packet. She was registered there in 1813.

Under a new captain named Caleb Seeley, she captured fourteen prizes before the year ended. In 1814, she captured additional prizes in May and June. Then in August, she took two prizes while acting in concert with HMS Shannon while they were sailing off of Bridgeport and New York. Liverpool Packet continued to work often with British naval vessels right to the war's end.

== Fate ==
Her owners registered Liverpool Packet at Nova Scotia on 6 January 1816. At some point thereafter, her owners sold her in Kingston, Jamaica; her subsequent fate is not known.

The War of 1812 was the last time the British allowed privateering. The practice was coming to be seen as politically inexpedient and of diminishing value in maintaining Britain's naval supremacy. The Treaty of Paris in 1856 banned privateering. However, the United States did not sign the treaty because the Americans saw their large merchant marine as a potential source of privateers in case of war.

== Modern replica ==
In 2014, a life-size model of the Liverpool Packet was unveiled at the Queens County Museum. Visitors to the museum can climb aboard the ship and interact with various interpretive panels, artifacts, and can fire a digital cannonball at a projection of an American vessel. The project was designed and created by SperryDesign and Atlantex Creative Works.

== Post script ==
In all, Liverpool Packet had taken 50 prizes in her brief but successful career. Her captures helped launch the great fortune of Enos Collins. Two steamships from her old homeport of Liverpool, Nova Scotia, were named in her honour in the 20th century.
