= Liverpool, Nova Scotia =

Community in Nova Scotia, Canada

Liverpool
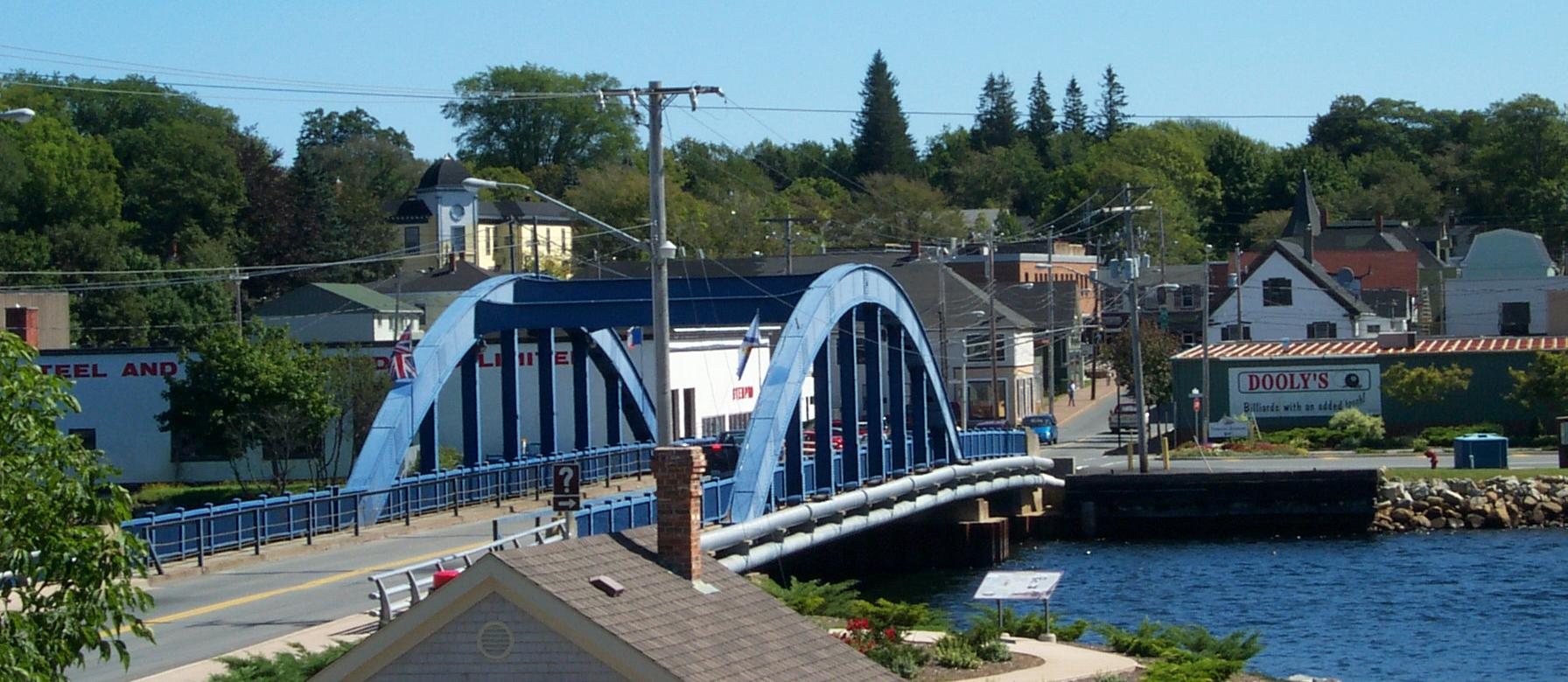
- Liverpool's bridge at Bristol Avenue
- Nickname: Port of the privateers
- Location in Nova Scotia
- Coordinates: 44°2′15″N 64°42′50″W
- Country: Canada
- Province: Nova Scotia
- Municipality: Region of Queens Municipality
- Founded: 1759
- Incorporated Town: 1897
- Amalgamated: April 1, 1996

Area
  - Urban: 3.59 km^{2} (1.39 sq mi)

Population (2021)
  - Urban: 2,546
  - Urban density: 708.5/km^{2} (1,835/sq mi)
  - Change (2016-2021): ▼−0.1%
- Time zone: UTC-4 (AST)
- Canadian Postal code: B0T 1K0
- Area code: 902 / 782
- Telephone Exchange: (782)339 821 (902)343 350 354 356 642 646 803 975
- Highways: Hwy 103; Trunk 8 Trunk 3

Liverpool is a Canadian community and former town located along the Atlantic Ocean of the Province of Nova Scotia's South Shore. It is situated within the Region of Queens Municipality, which is the local governmental unit that comprises all of Queens County, Nova Scotia.

== History ==
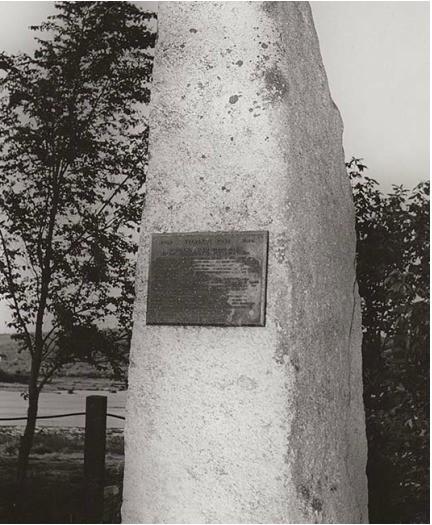
Silvanus Cobb Monument, Liverpool, Nova Scotia

Liverpool's harbour was an ancient seasonal camp of Nova Scotia's native Mi'kmaq and was known as Ogomkigeak meaning "dry sandy place" and Ogukegeok, meaning "place of departure". Samuel de Champlain's De Monts originally named the harbour Port Rossignol, following the arrest of prominent trader and New France founder Captain Rossignol whom he arrested here, and seized his vessel for contraband trade with the natives.

Later Nicolas Denys, a pioneering 17th-century French explorer and trader of Nova Scotia, was granted land here by the leader of Acadia, Isaac de Razilly (c. 1632).

Following the Expulsion of the Acadians (1755) during the French and Indian War (the North American theatre of the Seven Years' War), Liverpool was founded by New England Planters (commercially organized settlers) as a fishing port in 1759, originally named Lingley after Admiral Charles Lingley, and then renamed after Liverpool in England – which also lies along its own Mersey River. Silvanus Cobb was an original proprietor of the town. In 1759 Capt. Cobb became a proprietor of the new township of Liverpool. Liverpool township was to run from Cape Sable Island to Port Medway and continuing 14 miles inland from the shore. Sylvanus transported many of the other original residents to the new settlement. On July 1, 1760, at the first meeting of the proprietors, Capt. Cobb made a petition to be granted a piece of land to build a house and a wharf. The land was granted and the house was built at the foot of present-day Wolfe Street. There is a park and monument to Cobb at the site of his original home which was built from materials he transported from New England.

=== American Revolution ===
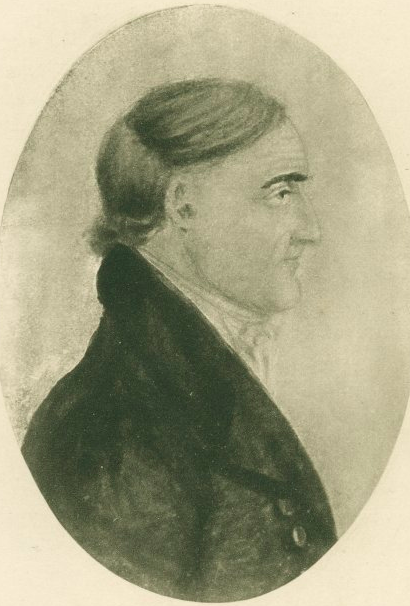
Col Simeon Perkins

Liverpool's struggle for identity during the revolutionary war has been the subject of considerable study by historians. The town was at first sympathetic to the cause of the American Revolution, with outlying outports like Port Medway and Port Mouton almost continuously visited by American privateers, but after repeated attacks by American privateers on local shipping interests and one direct attack on the town itself, Liverpool citizens turned against the rebellion. The defence of the town and the outfitting of privateers was led by Colonel Simeon Perkins.

==== Raid on Liverpool (1778) ====
On April 24, 1778, in the Battle off Liverpool, Nova Scotia (1778), the Royal Navy warship HMS Blonde under the command of Captain Milligan ran aground the French ship Duc de Choiseul under the command of Captain Pattier in Liverpool Harbour. There was an exchange of cannon fire lasting over three hours. A number of the French crew were killed, drowned and wounded. The 100 remaining French crew were taken prisoner. The arms that were on the wrecked ship continued to attract American privateers over the following month. Consequently, on May 1, American privateers raided Liverpool, ravaging and pillaging a number of the houses and stores, including the store of Simeon Perkins, a significant town leader. Three weeks later, on May 21, the same privateers returned and tried to tow the wreck of the Duc de Choiseul out to sea. Perkins mustered ten men at the shore. Cannon fire was exchanged by the British militia and the American privateers. The privateers continued to fire at the town for almost an hour. Perkins marched his men along the shore, closer to the privateers. One of the militia was wounded in the ensuing exchanges. The privateers stayed off shore for a number of days. Perkins kept a sergeant and six men on guard duty twenty four hours a day until the privateers left the area.

After suffering three years of similar sporadic raids, the people of Liverpool, on June 2, 1779 built a battery for the artillery, rebuilt Fort Morris (Nova Scotia) and on October 31 launched their own privateer vessel named Lucy to bring battle to their adversaries. As well, Perkins wrote a successful appeal to the authorities in Halifax, and on December 13, 1778 Capt. John Howard's company of the King's Orange Rangers arrived aboard the transport Hannah. The company consisted of Howard, 2 lieutenants, 1 ensign, 3 sergeants, 2 or 3 corporals, 48 privates, and several camp followers, both women and children.

In March 1780, Colonel Perkins ordered the seizure of the Dolphin.

==== Raid on Liverpool (1780) ====
The most dramatic privateer raid occurred on September 13, 1780. Two American privateers, the Surprize under Cpt. Benjamin Cole, and the Delight, under Cpt. Lane, unloaded nearly 70 men at Ballast Cove shortly after midnight. By 4am they had captured the fort and taken Howard, two other officers, and all but six of the KOR garrison as prisoners. Perkins called out the militia, engineered the capture of Cole, and negotiated with Lane for the recovery of the fort and the release of the prisoners. Within a few hours "every thing [was] restored to its former Situation without any Blood Shed." Liverpool was not bothered by privateers for the remainder of the war.

The town grew following the American Revolutionary War (1775–1783) with the arrival of American colonial refugees known as Loyalists.

=== War of 1812 ===
During the American Revolution, the Napoleonic Wars and the War of 1812, Liverpool financed and manned many privateer vessels which primarily targeted French vessels in the West Indies and American shipping off the Nova Scotia and New England coasts. The port was notable for such privateer vessels as the brig Rover and the schooner Liverpool Packet, mariners such as Joseph Barss, and ships' chandlers and merchants such as Enos Collins and Simeon Perkins. Significantly, an exciting eye-witness account of this turbulent period can be found in the published diaries of Simeon Perkins (1735–1812), an important businessman and leader in early Liverpool, having arrived from Connecticut in 1762 with the early settlers, and remaining an active member of the town for 50 years until his death in 1812.

=== Nineteenth century ===
During the 19th century, the town became a major seaport as the fishing and ship building industries grew. The town also became a leading exporter of timber which was floated down the Mersey River (or as initially called the Rivière Rossignol by the original Acadians) from the inland forests of the Lake Rossignol watershed. For a time after the War of 1812, Liverpool was second only to Halifax as the major port in the province, but was later eclipsed by western ports on the north shore of the province such as Pictou and New Glasgow on the Gulf of St. Lawrence.

The mid-19th century move toward steam-powered vessels which were built with steel, ruined the area's vibrant wooden-ship building industry, and the further financial dislocation caused by the collapse of the local Bank of Liverpool in 1871 combined to severely hurt the town's economy and it went into a slow decline.

=== Twentieth century ===
Liverpool's fortunes were temporarily revived in the 1920s when it became a centre for rum-runners shipping alcohol to the United States during its period of prohibition. More significant growth took place in 1929 when the Mersey Pulp and Paper Mill was completed in the adjoining village of Brooklyn. The paper company also founded its own shipping line, the Markland Shipping Company based in Liverpool. World War II bolstered the economy further as the town's shipyard, Thompson Bros. Machinery Co. Ltd. became a major player in refitting Royal Canadian Navy corvettes and minesweepers.

In 1996, Liverpool disincorporated as a town and merged with the Municipality of the County of Queens to form the Region of Queens Municipality. The Bowater Mersey Pulp and Paper plant closed in 2012.

== Geography ==
Liverpool is situated on the Atlantic coast along Nova Scotia's South Shore. The community primarily occupies the west bank of the mouth of the Mersey River and along its harbour front faces opposite the smaller community of Brooklyn which is situated on the east bank of the River. Beyond Liverpool, the river widens to become an estuary called Liverpool Bay, which is partially sheltered by Coffin Island, and there melds into the Atlantic Ocean. The Gulf Stream which passes just to the east of Nova Scotia in the Atlantic Ocean provides Liverpool with a year-round temperate northern climate.

Liverpool is located along Trunk Route 3 ("The Lighthouse Route") and at the junction of major Highway 103 (at Exit 19) and Trunk Route 8 ("The Kejimkujik Scenic Drive") which leads to the Bay of Fundy.

=== Climate ===
In spite of its seaside location beside the large Atlantic Ocean; Liverpool has a relatively mild humid continental climate typical of the province. Frequently prevailing inland winds ensure a lack of maritime moderation, resulting in large temperature differences between the warm summers averaging around 25 °C (77 °F) and the generally cold winter night time temperatures approaching −10 °C (14 °F) on average. Annual precipitation is quite high with frequent rain and snow storms in the fall, winter and spring. Summers are much drier, pleasant and warm. The highest temperature ever recorded in Liverpool was 36.7 °C (98 °F) on 22 August 1976. The coldest temperature ever recorded was −35.6 °C (−32 °F) on 18 February 1922.

Climate data for Liverpool (Milton), 1981–2010 normals, extremes 1913–present (Note: Extreme high and low temperatures in the table below were recorded at Liverpool from May 1913 to August 1959, at Liverpool Milton from August 1966 to November 2005 and at Western Head from December 2005 to present.)
Month	Jan	Feb	Mar	Apr	May	Jun	Jul	Aug	Sep	Oct	Nov	Dec	Year
Record high °C (°F)	19.0 (66.2)	17.0 (62.6)	29.2 (84.6)	27.8 (82.0)	35.5 (95.9)	35.5 (95.9)	35.0 (95.0)	36.7 (98.1)	34.7 (94.5)	30.0 (86.0)	26.7 (80.1)	17.8 (64.0)	36.7 (98.1)
Mean daily maximum °C (°F)	0.1 (32.2)	1.2 (34.2)	4.7 (40.5)	10.5 (50.9)	16.7 (62.1)	21.7 (71.1)	25.1 (77.2)	24.9 (76.8)	20.4 (68.7)	14.6 (58.3)	8.8 (47.8)	3.2 (37.8)	12.7 (54.9)
Daily mean °C (°F)	−4.8 (23.4)	−3.9 (25.0)	−0.2 (31.6)	5.5 (41.9)	10.9 (51.6)	15.8 (60.4)	19.3 (66.7)	19.2 (66.6)	14.9 (58.8)	9.4 (48.9)	4.4 (39.9)	−1.3 (29.7)	7.4 (45.3)
Mean daily minimum °C (°F)	−9.7 (14.5)	−8.9 (16.0)	−5.2 (22.6)	0.4 (32.7)	5.1 (41.2)	9.8 (49.6)	13.5 (56.3)	13.3 (55.9)	9.5 (49.1)	4.2 (39.6)	0.0 (32.0)	−5.8 (21.6)	2.2 (36.0)
Record low °C (°F)	−31.7 (−25.1)	−35.6 (−32.1)	−26.1 (−15.0)	−21.1 (−6.0)	−8.9 (16.0)	−3.3 (26.1)	0.6 (33.1)	−1.1 (30.0)	−4.4 (24.1)	−11.1 (12.0)	−15.0 (5.0)	−27.0 (−16.6)	−35.6 (−32.1)
Average precipitation mm (inches)	158.5 (6.24)	137.1 (5.40)	164.8 (6.49)	145.5 (5.73)	135.6 (5.34)	108.7 (4.28)	97.8 (3.85)	89.1 (3.51)	121.8 (4.80)	128.5 (5.06)	179.8 (7.08)	176.2 (6.94)	1,643.4 (64.70)
Average rainfall mm (inches)	107.3 (4.22)	101.1 (3.98)	136.2 (5.36)	138.6 (5.46)	135.6 (5.34)	108.7 (4.28)	97.8 (3.85)	89.1 (3.51)	121.8 (4.80)	128.5 (5.06)	174.7 (6.88)	149.9 (5.90)	1,489.3 (58.63)
Average snowfall cm (inches)	51.3 (20.2)	35.7 (14.1)	28.6 (11.3)	7.0 (2.8)	0.0 (0.0)	0.0 (0.0)	0.0 (0.0)	0.0 (0.0)	0.0 (0.0)	0.0 (0.0)	5.1 (2.0)	26.3 (10.4)	153.9 (60.6)
Average precipitation days (≥ 0.2 mm)	12.6	10.5	12.8	13.9	13.5	11.9	10.2	10.1	10.9	13.0	13.6	13.6	146.6
Average rainy days (≥ 0.2 mm)	7.5	7.0	9.7	13.5	13.5	11.9	10.2	10.1	10.9	13.0	13.0	10.1	130.4
Average snowy days (≥ 0.2 cm)	6.5	4.5	4.1	1.0	0.0	0.0	0.0	0.0	0.0	0.0	0.86	4.6	21.6
Source: Environment Canada

== Economy ==
Historical population
Year	Pop.	±%
1762	504	—
1901	1,937	+284.3%
1911	2,109	+8.9%
1921	2,294	+8.8%
1931	2,669	+16.3%
1941	3,170	+18.8%
1951	3,535	+11.5%
1956	3,500	−1.0%
1961	3,712	+6.1%
1981	3,302	−11.0%
1986	3,295	−0.2%
1991	3,113	−5.5%
1996	3,048	−2.1%
2001	2,866	−6.0%
2006	2,759	−3.7%
2011	2,653	−3.8%
2016	2,549	−3.9%

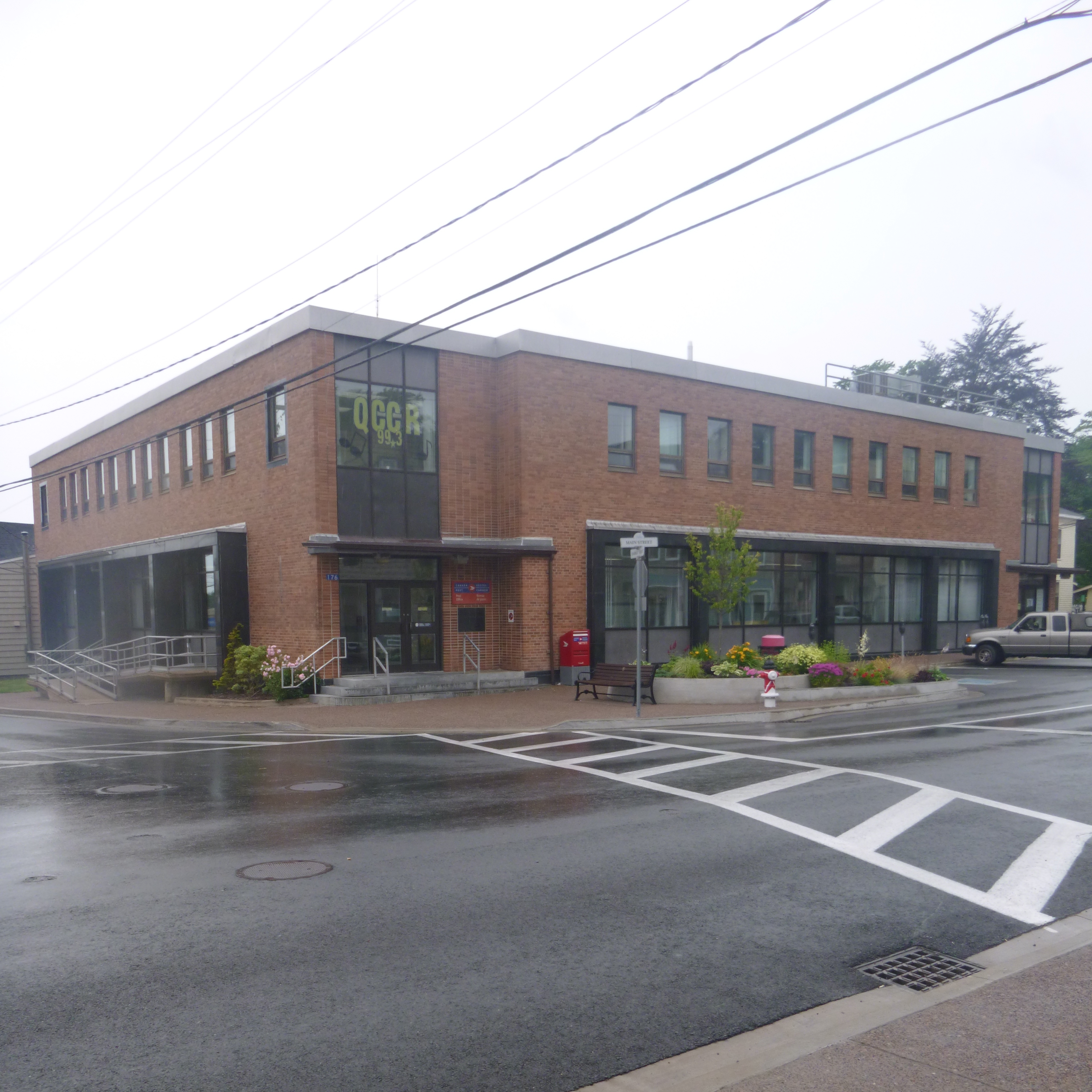
Liverpool post office

As the largest population centre in the fairhaven of Queens County, Liverpool has a diverse business community. Many large business franchises provide modern convenience, while the community's quaint small shops still thrive in the original business district on Main Street. Commercial and recreational fishing still play an important role in the local economy. Liverpool's largest employer was once the Bowater Mersey Paper Company Limited, which operated a pulp mill and newsprint mill situated in nearby Brooklyn. The mill closed in June 2012.

Queens Place Emera Centre is a major, modern recreation centre that serves the entire Regional Municipality of Queens. The NHL-sized ice surface has double-sided permanent seating for 1000 spectators. The centre was built along with a large Best Western hotel complex to facilitate large tournaments and thus draw visitors to the area. Queens place is home for many hockey teams: local minor hockey team, the Cougars; major hockey team, Western Hurricanes; and a Junior B team, the Liverpool Privateers.

== Tourism ==
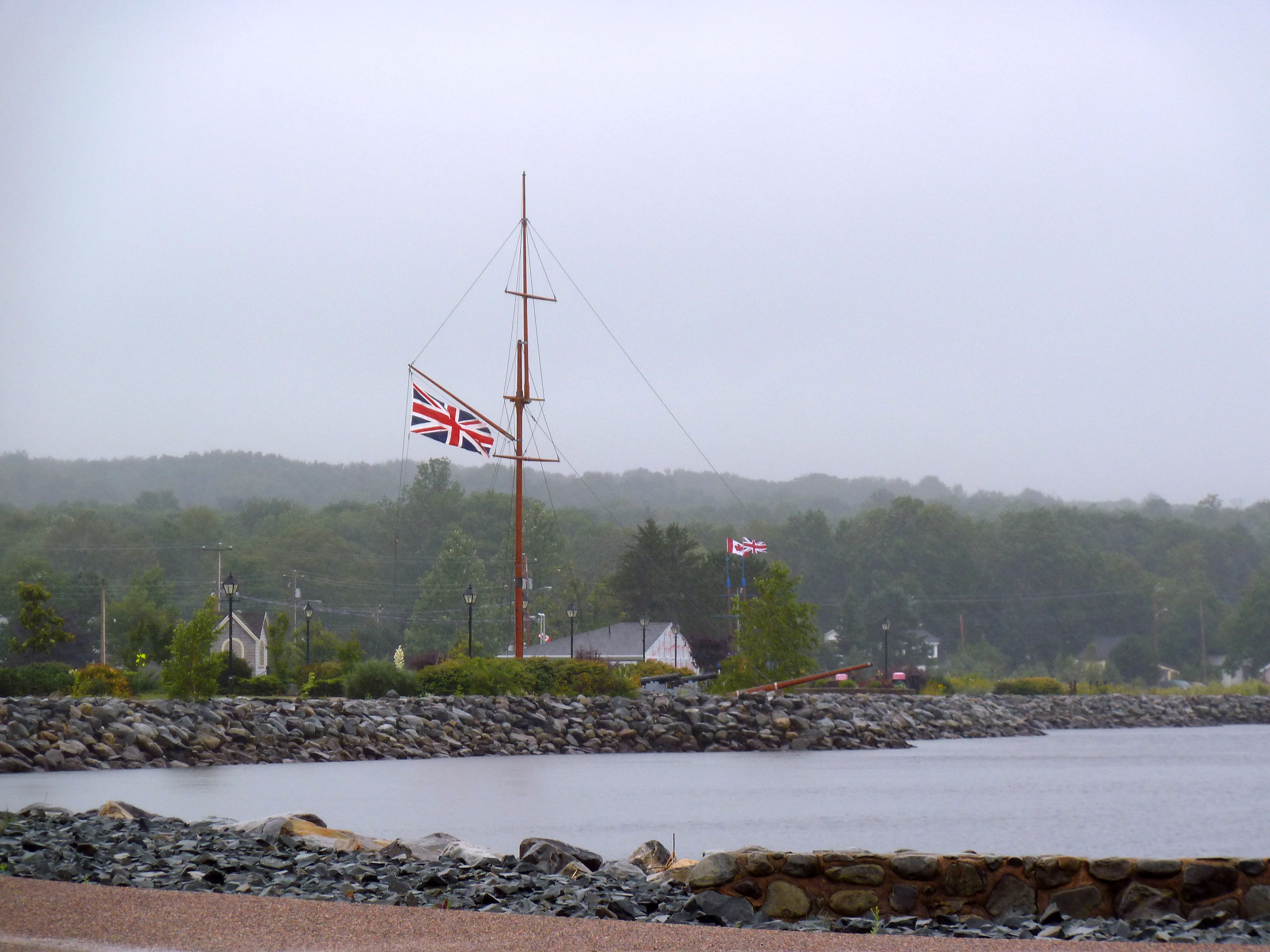
Harbour at Liverpool, Nova Scotia

Tourism has become increasingly important to Liverpool and the South Shore region in recent decades, particularly as tourists travel the "Lighthouse Route" (a scenic drive between Halifax and Yarmouth). Liverpool has a large number of museums for a small community. They include the Queens County Museum and the adjacent Perkins House the 1766 built residence of Simeon Perkins and now part of the Nova Scotia Museum system. Perkins house was closed to the public in 2015 after the province, citing shifting floor beams deemed the building a safety hazard and that the provincial budget cannot afford the cost of repairs. It reopened in 2021 after the repairs were eventually completed.

Other museums include the Museum of Justice located in the former courthouse, the Hank Snow Home Town Museum located in the former Liverpool train station, and two private museums run by Nova Scotian photographer Sherman Hines. Facing Liverpool Harbour is the Fort Point Lighthouse, the third oldest lighthouse in Nova Scotia which contains a lighthouse museum and is surrounded by a public park. In late June of each year, history comes alive in Liverpool during "Privateer Days" when over a long weekend members of the community conduct a parade, provide various entertainment venues, re-enact a Loyalist military and privateer encampment, shoot fireworks, and conduct guided graveyard tours. Liverpool has also become a summer break destination for residents of Halifax due to its warm weather and nearby sandy beaches. Beach Meadows is a 1 km long beach to the east of Liverpool.

== Notable residents ==
- Simeon Perkins (1735–1812), militia leader, judge, merchant, diarist and politician
- Hank Snow (1914–1999), Canadian-American country music artist
- Thomas Head Raddall (1903–1994), author
- Bruce Palmer (1946–2004), musician, bassist, and founding member of country-rock band Buffalo Springfield
- Hal Willis (born 1946), retired ice hockey defenceman
- Walter Vail (1852–1906), born in Liverpool, businessman
- Martin Long (born 1977), born in Liverpool, Alberta politician.
