= Prince Edward, Duke of Kent and Strathearn =

British prince (1767–1820)

Prince Edward
- Duke of Kent and Strathearn
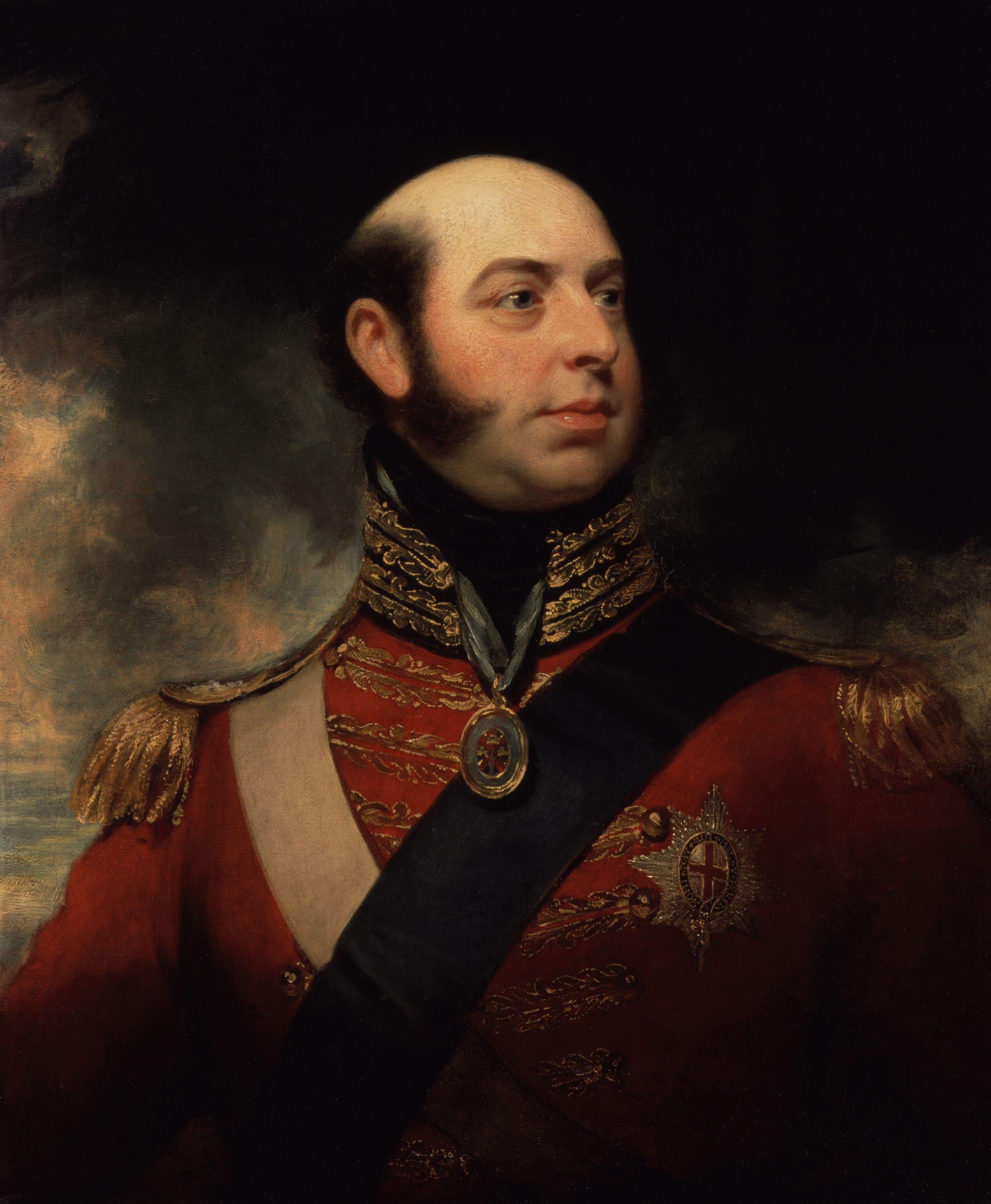
- Portrait by Sir William Beechey, 1818
- Born: 2 November 1767; Buckingham House, London, England
- Died: 23 January 1820 (aged 52); Woolbrook Cottage, Sidmouth, England
- Burial: 12 February 1820; Royal Vault, St George's Chapel, Windsor Castle
- Spouse: Princess Victoria of Saxe-Coburg-Saalfeld (m. 1818)
- Issue: Queen Victoria; Illegitimate: Adelaide Victoria Augusta Dubus; Edward Schenker Scheener
Names
- Edward Augustus
- House: Hanover
- Father: George III
- Mother: Charlotte of Mecklenburg-Strelitz

Governor of Gibraltar
- In office 24 May 1802 – 23 January 1820
- Preceded by: Charles Barnett
- Succeeded by: Thomas Trigge

Grand Master of the Antient Grand Lodge of England
- In office 1813–1813
- Preceded by: John Murray
- Succeeded by: Prince Augustus Frederick (Note: As Grand Master of the United Grand Lodge of England)

Commander-in-Chief, Maritime Provinces
- In office September 1799 – August 1800
- Preceded by: John Campbell
- Succeeded by: Sir John Sherbrooke
- Military career
- Allegiance: Kingdom of Great Britain; United Kingdom
- Branch: British Army
- Years of active service: 1786–1805
- Rank: Field marshal (active service)
- Units: 7th Regiment of Foot (Royal Fusiliers)
- Commands: Commander-in-Chief, North America; Governor of Gibraltar
- Conflicts: French Revolutionary Wars; Napoleonic Wars; War of the First Coalition; Battle of Martinique; Battle of Guadaloupe
- Awards: Mentioned in dispatches

Prince Edward, Duke of Kent and Strathearn (Edward Augustus; 2 November 1767 – 23 January 1820), was the fourth son and fifth child of King George III and Queen Charlotte. His only legitimate child, Victoria, became Queen of the United Kingdom 17 years after his death.

Edward lived in Lower Canada and Nova Scotia from 1791 to 1800, where he served as commander-in-chief of British forces in the Maritime Provinces of North America. He was the first British prince to visit the United States following British recognition of its independence in 1783, travelling on foot to Boston from Lower Canada in 1794.

He was created Duke of Kent and Strathearn and Earl of Dublin in 1799, and shortly thereafter appointed a General. In 1802 he became Governor of Gibraltar, a post he nominally held until his death. He was promoted to Field-Marshal of the Forces in 1805.

== Early life ==
Edward was born on 2 November 1767 to King George III and Queen Charlotte. He was fourth in the line of succession to the British throne. He was named after his uncle Prince Edward, Duke of York and Albany, who had died several weeks earlier and was buried at Westminster Abbey the day before Edward's birth.

Edward was baptised on 30 November; his godparents were the Hereditary Prince of Brunswick-Lüneburg (his paternal uncle by marriage, for whom the Earl of Hertford, Lord Chamberlain, stood proxy), Duke Charles of Mecklenburg-Strelitz (his maternal uncle, for whom the Earl of Huntingdon, Groom of the Stole, stood proxy), the Hereditary Princess of Brunswick-Wolfenbüttel (his paternal aunt, who was represented by a proxy) and the Landgravine of Hesse-Kassel (his paternal grandfather's sister, for whom Elizabeth, Marchioness of Lorne, Lady of the Bedchamber to the Queen, stood proxy). As a child he was tutored by John Fisher.

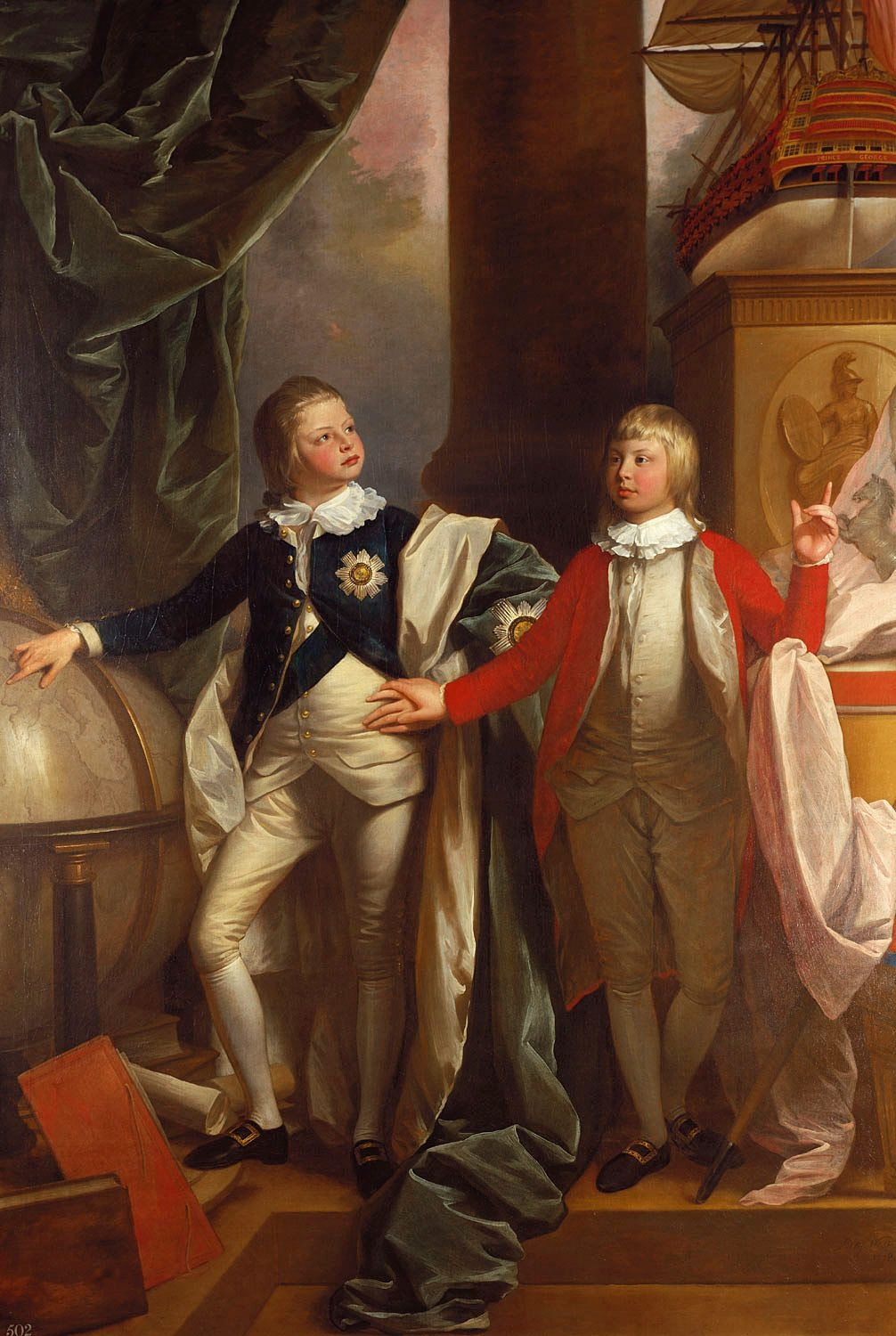
Edward aged eleven (right) and his older brother William, portrait by Benjamin West, 1778

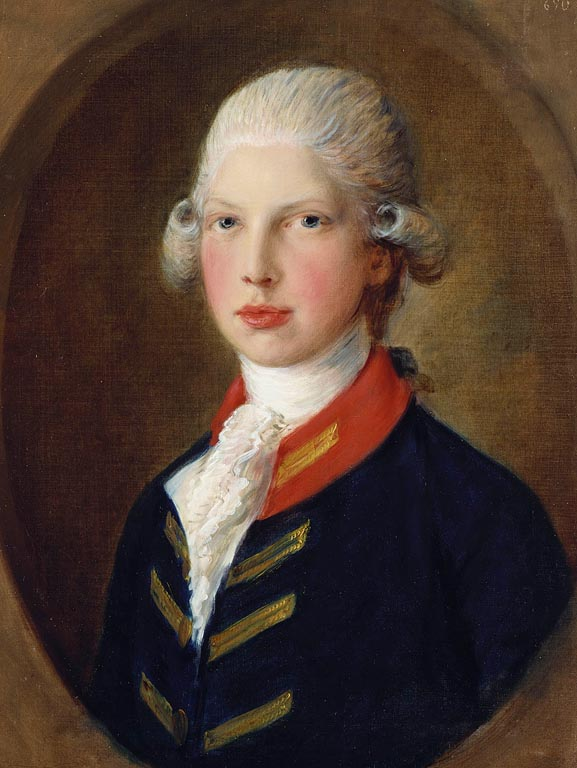
Prince Edward in 1782, portrait by Thomas Gainsborough

== Military career ==
=== Army ===
The Prince began his military training in the Electorate of Hanover in 1785. King George III intended to send him to the University of Göttingen, but decided against it upon the advice of the Duke of York. Instead, Edward went to Lüneburg and later Hanover, accompanied by his German tutor, Lieutenant Colonel George von Wangenheim, Baron Wangenheim. On 30 May 1786, he was appointed a brevet colonel in the British Army. From 1788 to 1789, he completed his education in Geneva. On 5 August 1789, aged 21, he became a mason in L'Union, the most important Genevan masonic lodge in the 19th century.

In 1789, he was appointed colonel of the 7th Regiment of Foot (Royal Fusiliers). In 1790, he returned home without leave and, in disgrace, was sent off to Gibraltar as an ordinary officer. He was joined from Marseilles by his mistress Madame de Saint-Laurent.

==== Quebec ====
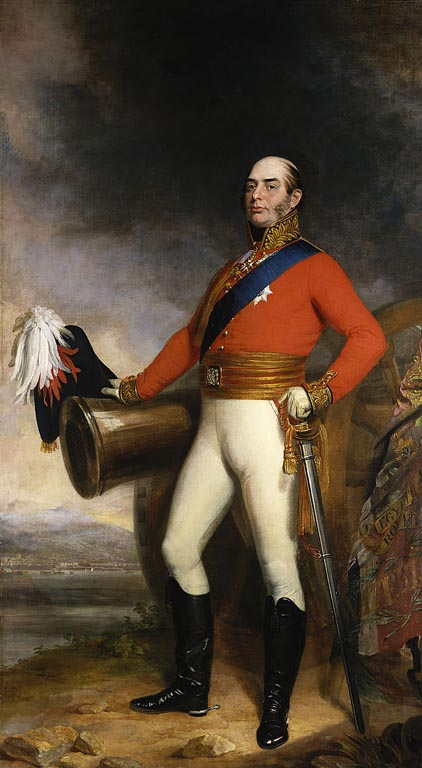
Prince Edward, Duke of Kent, Commander-in-Chief, North America, 1791–1802

Due to the extreme Mediterranean heat, Edward requested to be transferred to present-day Canada, specifically Quebec, in 1791. Edward arrived in Canada in time to witness the proclamation of the Constitutional Act of 1791, became the first member of the Royal Family to tour Upper Canada, and became a fixture of British North American society. Edward and his mistress, Julie St. Laurent, became close friends with the French Canadian family of Ignace-Michel-Louis-Antoine d'Irumberry de Salaberry; the Prince mentored all of the family's sons throughout their military careers. Edward guided Charles de Salaberry throughout his career, and made sure that the famous commander was duly honoured after his leadership during the Battle of Chateauguay.

The prince was promoted to the rank of major-general in October 1793. He served successfully in the West Indies campaign the following year, and was commander of the British camp at La Coste during the Battle of Martinique, for which he was mentioned in dispatches by General Charles Grey for his "great Spirit and Activity". He subsequently received the thanks of Parliament.

==== Nova Scotia ====
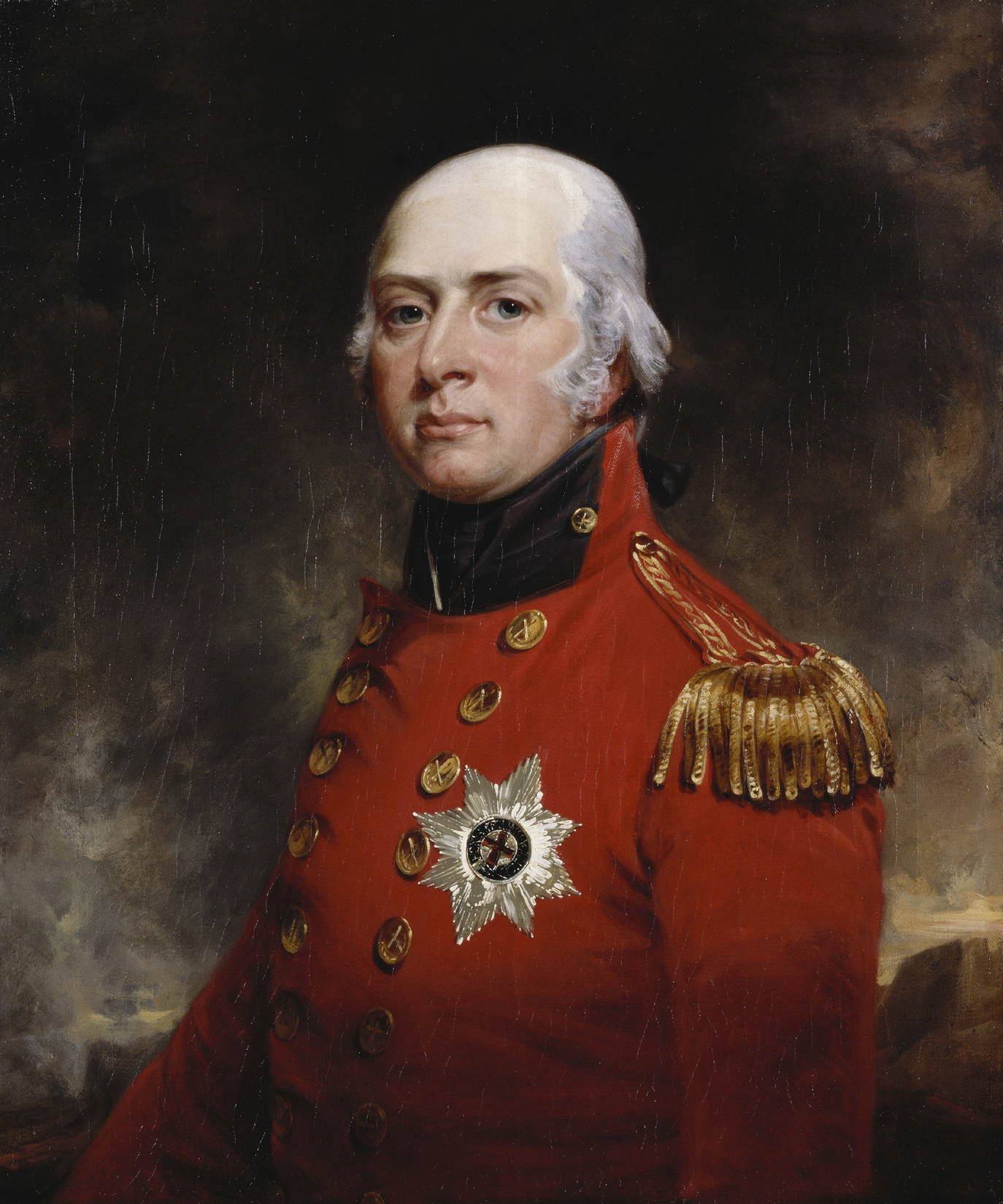
Prince Edward, Duke of Kent, by John Hoppner, c. 1798

After 1794, Edward lived at the headquarters of the Royal Navy's North American Station located in Halifax, Nova Scotia. He was instrumental in shaping that settlement's military defences, protecting its important Royal Navy base, as well as influencing the city's and colony's socio-political and economic institutions. Edward was responsible for the construction of Halifax's iconic Garrison Clock, as well as numerous other civic projects such as St. George's Round Church. Lieutenant Governor Sir John Wentworth and Lady Francis Wentworth provided their country residence for the use of Edward and Julie St. Laurent. Extensively renovated, the estate became known as "Prince's Lodge" as the couple hosted numerous dignitaries, including Louis-Phillippe of Orléans (the future King of the French). All that remains of the residence is a small rotunda built by Edward for his regimental band to play music.

After suffering a fall from his horse in late 1798, he was allowed to return to England. On 24 April 1799, Edward was created Duke of Kent and Strathearn and Earl of Dublin, and received the thanks of parliament and an income of £12,000 (£1.19 million in 2025). In May that same year, the Duke was promoted to the rank of general and appointed Commander-in-Chief of British forces in North America. He took leave of his parents on 22 July 1799 and sailed to Halifax. Just over twelve months later he left Halifax and arrived in England on 31 August 1800 where it was confidently expected his next appointment would be Lord Lieutenant of Ireland.

==== Gibraltar ====
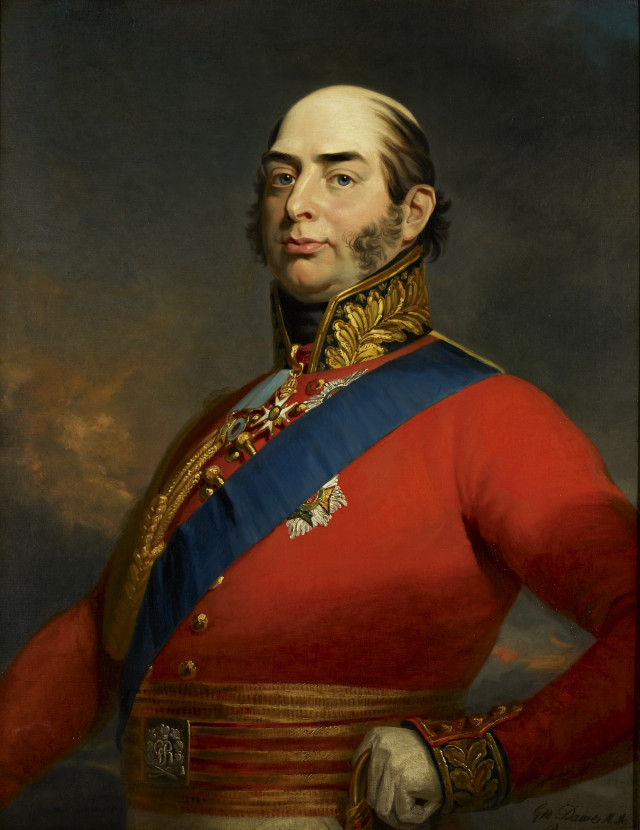
The Duke of Kent and Strathearn by George Dawe

Appointed Governor of Gibraltar by the War Office, gazetted 23 March 1802, the Duke took up his post on 24 May with express orders from the government to restore discipline among the drunken troops. The Duke's harsh discipline precipitated a mutiny by soldiers in his own and the 25th Regiment on Christmas Eve. His brother Frederick, the Duke of York, then Commander-in-Chief of the Forces, recalled him in May 1803 after receiving reports of the mutiny, but despite this direct order he refused to return to England until his successor arrived. He was refused permission to return to Gibraltar for an inquiry and, although allowed to continue to hold the governorship of Gibraltar until his death, he was forbidden to return.

As a consolation for the ending of his active military career when he was 35, he was promoted to the rank of field marshal and appointed Ranger of Hampton Court Park on 5 September 1805. This office provided him with a residence now known as The Pavilion. (His sailor brother, William, with children to provide for, had been made Ranger of Bushy Park in 1797.) The Duke continued to serve as honorary colonel of the 1st Regiment of Foot (the Royal Scots) until his death.

Though it was a tendency shared to some extent with his brothers, the Duke's excesses as a military disciplinarian may have been due less to natural disposition and more to what he had learned from his tutor Baron Wangenheim. Certainly Wangenheim, by keeping his allowance very small, accustomed Edward to borrowing at an early age. The Duke applied the same military discipline to his own duties that he demanded of others. Though it seems inconsistent with his unpopularity among the army's rank and file, his friendliness toward others and popularity with servants has been emphasised. He also introduced the first regimental school. The Duke of Wellington considered him a first-class speaker. He took a continuing interest in the social experiments of Robert Owen, voted for Catholic emancipation, and supported literary, Bible, and abolitionist societies.

His daughter, Victoria, after hearing Lord Melbourne's opinions, was able to add to her private journal of 1 August 1838 "from all what I heard, he was the best of all".

== Personal life and interests ==
=== Marriage ===
==== Role in the royal succession ====
Following the death in November 1817 of Princess Charlotte of Wales, the only legitimate grandchild of George III at the time, the royal succession began to look uncertain. The Prince Regent (later King George IV) and his younger brother Prince Frederick, Duke of York and Albany, though married, were estranged from their wives and had no surviving legitimate children. The King's fifth son, Ernest Augustus, Duke of Cumberland, was already married but had no living children at that time, while the marriage of the sixth son, Prince Augustus Frederick, Duke of Sussex, was void because he had married in contravention of the Royal Marriages Act 1772. The king's surviving daughters were all childless and past likely childbearing age. The King's unmarried sons, the Duke of Clarence (later King William IV), Edward, Duke of Kent, and Prince Adolphus, Duke of Cambridge, all rushed to contract lawful marriages and provide an heir to the throne.

==== Princess Victoria of Saxe-Coburg-Saalfeld ====
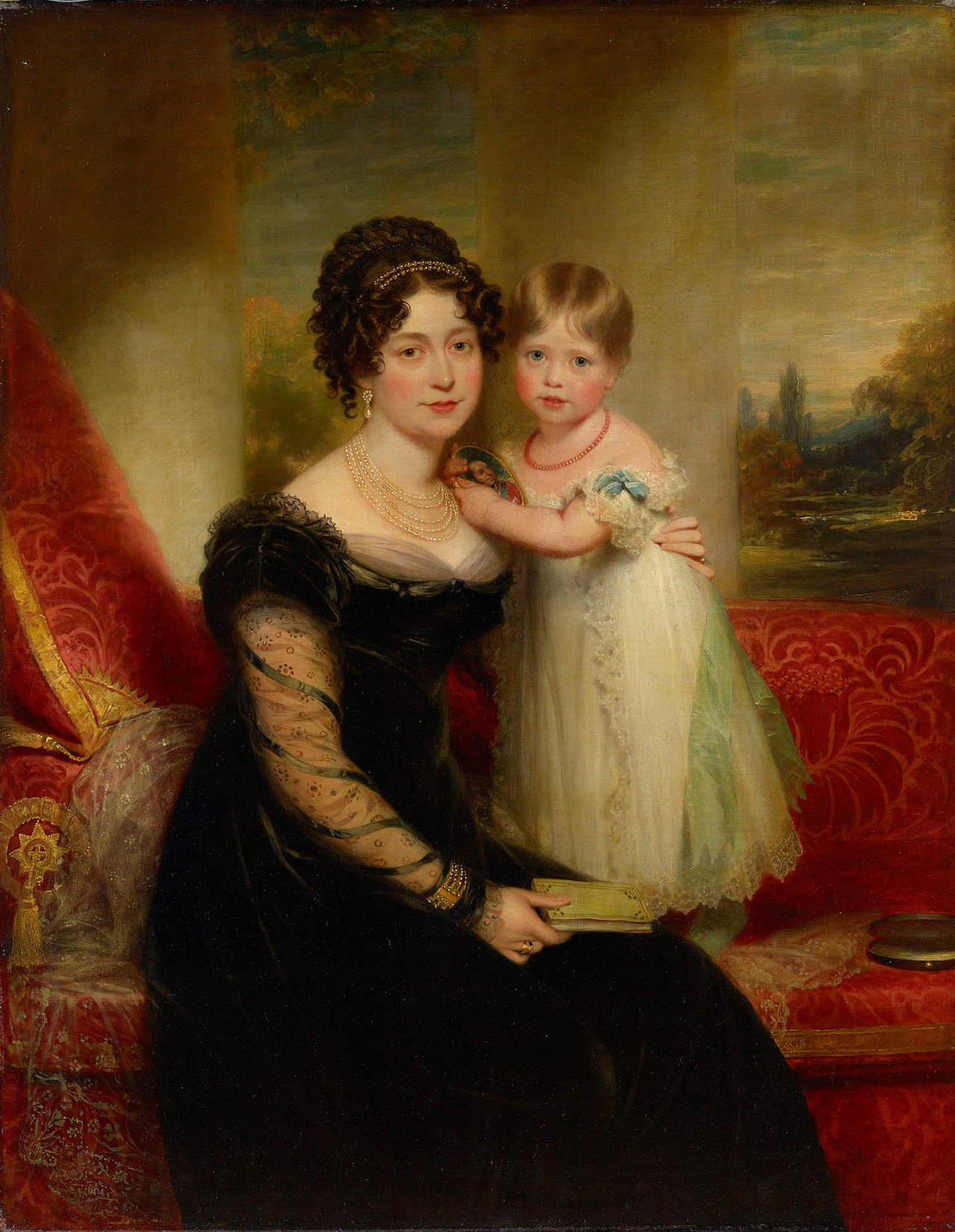
Victoria, Duchess of Kent with Princess Victoria by William Beechey, 1821

For his part, the Duke of Kent, aged 50, was already considering marriage, and he became engaged to Princess Victoria of Saxe-Coburg-Saalfeld, sister-in-law of his late niece Charlotte. They were married on 29 May 1818 at Ehrenburg Palace, Coburg, in a Lutheran rite, and again on 11 July 1818 at Kew Palace, Kew, Surrey.

Victoria was the daughter of Francis, Duke of Saxe-Coburg-Saalfeld, and the sister of Prince Leopold of Saxe-Coburg-Saalfeld, widower of Princess Charlotte. She was a widow; her first husband had been Emich Carl, 2nd Prince of Leiningen, with whom she had had two children: a son, Karl, 3rd Prince of Leiningen, and a daughter, Princess Feodora of Leiningen.

==== Issue ====
They had one child, Alexandrina Victoria, born 24 May 1819. He was 51 years old at the time of her birth. The Duke took great pride in his daughter, telling his friends to look at her well, for she would be Queen of the United Kingdom.

=== Mistresses ===
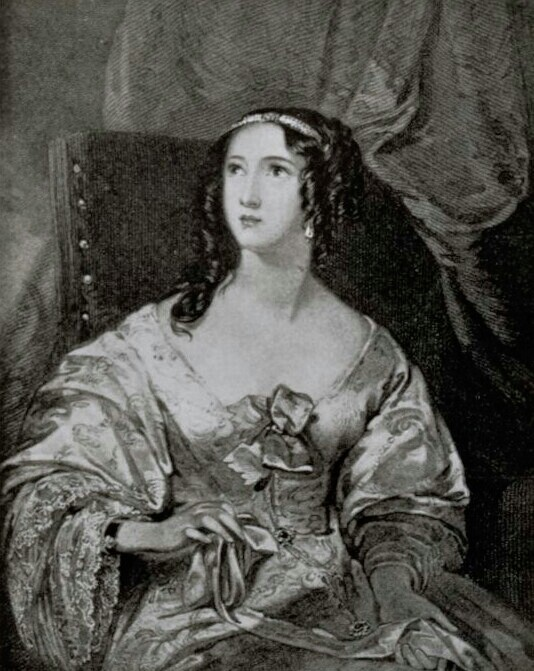
Madame de Saint-Laurent, a mistress of Prince Edward

Various sources report that the Duke of Kent had mistresses. In Geneva, he had two mistresses, Adelaide Dubus and Anne Moré. Dubus died at the birth of her daughter Adelaide Victoria Augusta Dubus (1789 – 1790). Anne Gabrielle Alexandrine Moré was the mother of Edward Schenker Scheener (1789–1853). Brought up in Geneva as the ostensible son of Thimothée Schencker, his father promised to find him a post in the UK civil service and in 1809 he was appointed a clerk in the Foreign Office, being retired with a pension in 1826. When his half-sister Victoria became Queen in 1837, with his English wife Harriet Boyn (1781–1852) he returned to Geneva, where he died in 1853. He had no children.

In 1790, while still in Geneva, the Duke took up with "Madame de Saint-Laurent" (born Thérèse-Bernardine Montgenet), the wife of a French colonel. She went with him to Canada in 1791, where she was known as "Julie de Saint-Laurent". She accompanied the Duke for the next 28 years, until his marriage in 1818. The portrait of the Duke by Beechey was hers.

Mollie Gillen, who was granted access to the Royal Archive at Windsor Castle, established that no children were born of the 27-year relationship between Edward Augustus and Madame de Saint-Laurent, although many Canadian families and individuals (including the Nova Scotian soldier Sir William Fenwick Williams, 1st Baronet) have claimed descent from them. Such claims can now be discounted in light of this research.

== Canadian Confederation ==
While Edward lived in Quebec (1791–93) he met with Jonathan Sewell, an immigrant American Loyalist who played trumpet in the Prince's regimental band. Sewell would rise in Lower Canadian government to hold such offices as Attorney General, Chief Justice, and Speaker of the Legislative Assembly. In 1814, Sewell forwarded to the Duke a copy of his report "A plan for the federal union of British provinces in North America." The Duke supported Sewell's plan to unify the colonies, offering comments and critiques that would later be cited by Lord Durham (1839) and participants of the Charlottetown and Quebec Conferences (1864).

Edward's 1814 letter to Sewell:

My dear Sewell,

I have had this day the pleasure of receiving your note of yesterday with its interesting enclosure. Nothing can be better arranged than the whole thing is or more perfectly, and when I see an opening it is fully my intention to point the matter out to Lord Bathurst and put the paper in his hands, without however telling him from whom I have it, though I shall urge him to have some conversation with you relative to it. Permit me, however, just to ask you whether it was not an oversight in you to state that there are five Houses of Assembly in the British Colonies in North America. If I am not under an error there are six, viz., Upper and Lower Canada, New Brunswick, Nova Scotia and the islands of Prince Edward and Cape Breton.

Allow me to beg of you to put down the proportions in which you think the thirty members of the Representatives Assembly ought to be furnished by each Province, and to suggest whether you would not think two Lieutenant-Governors with two Executive Councils sufficient for an executive government of the whole, namely one for the two Canadas, and one for New Brunswick and the two small dependencies of Cape Breton and Prince Edward Island, the former to reside in Montreal, and the latter at whichever of the two (following) situations may be considered most central for the two provinces whether Annapolis Royal or Windsor.

But, at all events, should you consider in your Executive Councils requisite I presume there cannot be a question of the expediency of comprehending the two small islands in the Gulf of St. Lawrence with Nova Scotia.

Believe me ever to remain,

With the most friendly regard,

My dear Sewell,

Yours faithfully,

EDWARD

== Freemasonry – United Grand Lodge of England ==
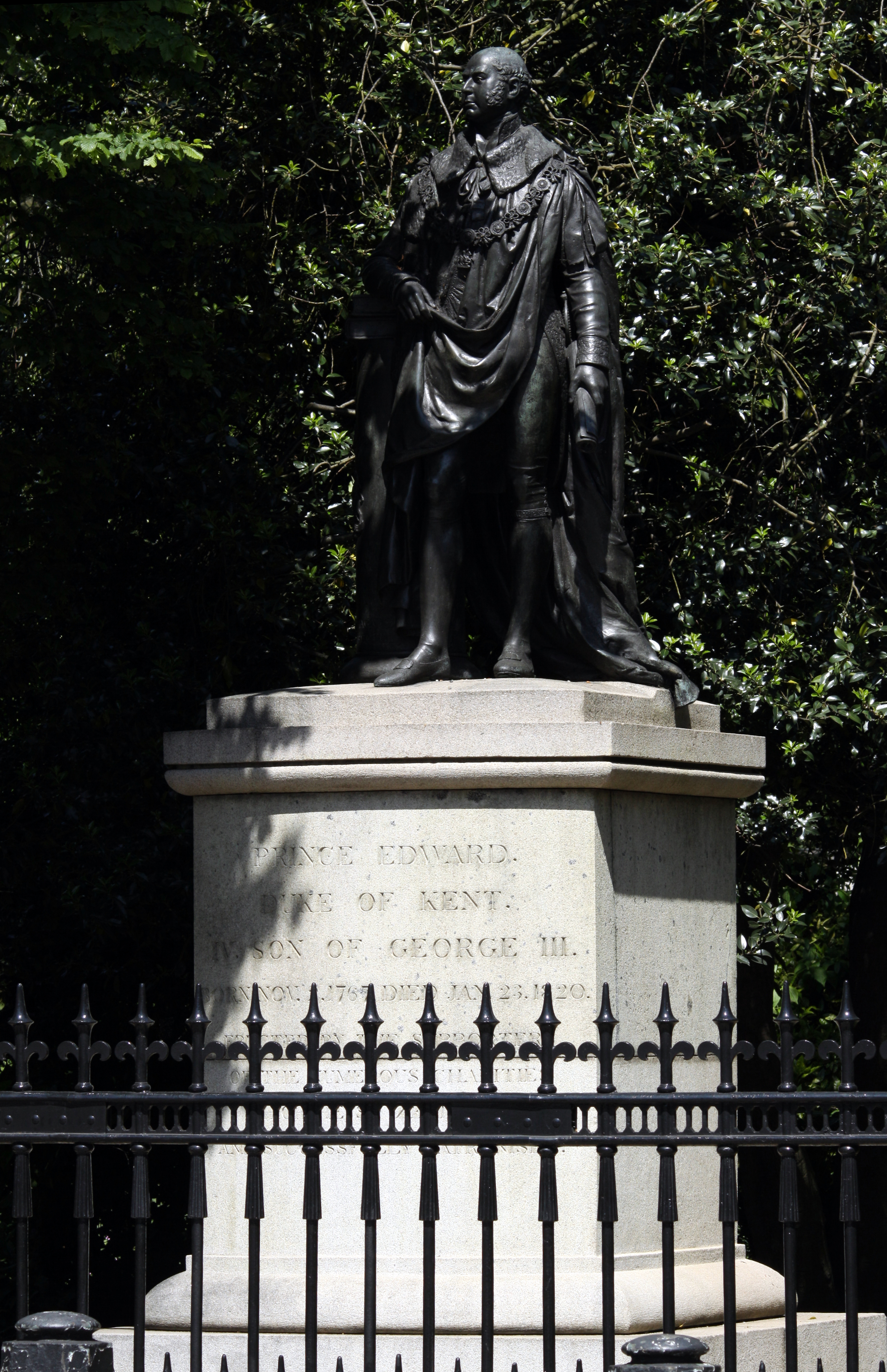
1824 Statue of the Duke of Kent in Park Crescent, London.

In January 1813, Edward's brother, Prince Augustus Frederick, Duke of Sussex (sixth son of King George III), became Grand Master of the Premier Grand Lodge of England (aka "The Moderns") on the resignation of his brother, the Prince Regent; and, in December of that year, Edward became Grand Master of the Antient Grand Lodge of England (aka "The Ancients"). In 1811, both Grand Lodges had appointed Commissioners; and over the ensuing two years, articles of Union were negotiated and agreed upon. On 27 December 1813, the United Grand Lodge of England, formed as a result of these negotiations, was constituted at Freemasons' Hall, London with the younger Duke of Sussex as Grand Master. A Lodge of Reconciliation was formed a few weeks prior to reconcile the rituals worked under the two former Grand Lodges.

== Later life ==
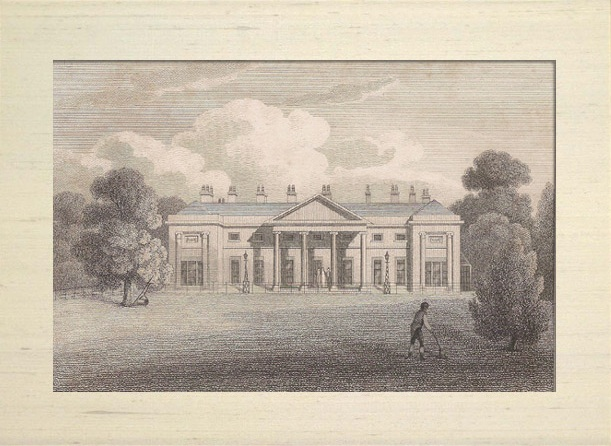
Castle Hill Lodge 1814

The Duke of Kent purchased a house of his own from Maria Fitzherbert in 1801. Castle Hill Lodge on Castlebar Hill, Ealing (West London), was then placed in the hands of architect James Wyatt and more than £100,000 spent (£6.47 million in 2025). Near neighbours from 1815 to 1817 at Little Boston House were US envoy and future US President John Quincy Adams and his English wife Louisa. "We all went to church and heard a charity sermon preached by a Dr Crane before the Duke of Kent", wrote Adams in a diary entry from August 1815.

Following the birth of Princess Victoria in May 1819, the Duke and Duchess, concerned to manage the Duke's great debts, sought to find a place where they could live inexpensively. After the coast of Devon was recommended to them, they leased from a General Baynes, intending to remain incognito, Woolbrook Cottage on the seaside by Sidmouth.

=== Death ===
Edward died of pneumonia on 23 January 1820 at Woolbrook Cottage, Sidmouth, aged 52, and was interred in St. George's Chapel, Windsor Castle. He died six days before his father, George III, and less than a year after his daughter's birth.

As none of his elder brothers had any surviving legitimate children, his daughter Victoria succeeded to the throne on the death of her uncle King William IV in 1837, and reigned until 1901.

In 1829, the Duke's former aide-de-camp purchased the unoccupied Castle Hill Lodge from the Duchess in an attempt to reduce her debts; the debts were finally discharged after Victoria took the throne and paid them over time from her income.

== Legacy ==
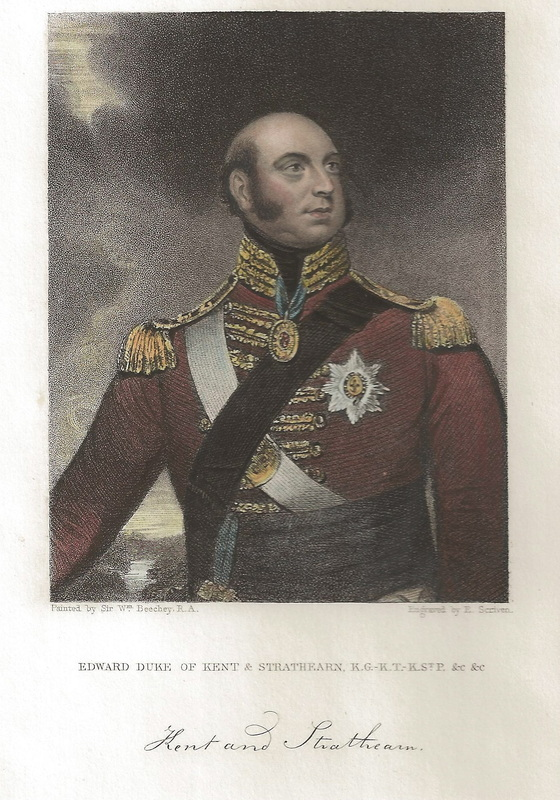
Edward Scriven engraving of Prince Edward, Duke of Kent and Strathearn (1834) after W. Beechey's portrait

There is a bronze statue of the prince in Park Crescent, London. Sculpted by Sebastian Gahagan and installed in January 1824, the statue is seven feet two inches (2.18 m) tall and represents the Duke in his Field Marshal's uniform, over which he wears his ducal dress and the regalia of the Order of the Garter. He is the namesake of Prince Edward Island; the Prince Edward Islands; Prince Edward County, Ontario; Kentville, Nova Scotia; and Duke Street, Halifax, Nova Scotia.

He is credited with the first use of the term Canadian to mean both French and English settlers in the Canadas, using the term to quell a riot between the two groups at a polling station in Charlesbourg on 27 June 1792.

In the 21st century, he has been styled the "Father of the Canadian Crown" for his contribution to the development of Canada.

== Honours and arms ==
Arms of Prince Edward, Duke of Kent and Strathearn used from 1801 until his death

=== Honours ===
- Knight Founder of St. Patrick, 11 March 1783
- Royal Knight of the Garter, 2 June 1786
- Privy Councilor of the United Kingdom, 5 September 1799
- Knight Grand Cross of the Bath (military), 2 January 1815
- Knight Grand Cross of the Royal Hanoverian Guelphic Order (military), 12 April 1815

=== Arms ===
As a son of the sovereign, the Duke of Kent had use of the arms of the kingdom from 1801 to his death, differenced by a label argent of three points, the centre point bearing a cross gules, the outer points each bearing a fleur-de-lys azure.

== Ancestry ==
Ancestors of Prince Edward, Duke of Kent and Strathearn

8. George II of Great Britain
4. Frederick, Prince of Wales
9. Princess Caroline of Brandenburg-Ansbach
2. George III of the United Kingdom
10. Frederick II, Duke of Saxe-Gotha-Altenburg
5. Princess Augusta of Saxe-Gotha
11. Princess Magdalena Augusta of Anhalt-Zerbst
1. Prince Edward, Duke of Kent and Strathearn
12. Adolphus Frederick II, Duke of Mecklenburg-Strelitz
6. Duke Charles Louis Frederick of Mecklenburg-Strelitz
13. Christiane Emilie of Schwarzburg-Sondershausen
3. Princess Charlotte of Mecklenburg-Strelitz
14. Ernest Frederick I, Duke of Saxe-Hildburghausen
7. Princess Elisabeth Albertine of Saxe-Hildburghausen
15. Countess Sophia Albertine of Erbach-Erbach

== Explanatory notes ==
Prince Edward, Duke of Kent and Strathearn House of Hanover Cadet branch of the House of Welf Born: 2 November 1767 Died: 23 January 1820
Political offices
Preceded by Charles Barnett	Governor of Gibraltar; 1802–1820	Succeeded by Henry Fox (acting)
Military offices
Preceded by John Campbell, of Strachur	Commander-in-Chief, North America; 1799–1800	Succeeded by George Prevost
Preceded by William Gordon	Colonel of the 7th Regiment of Foot (Royal Fuzileers); 1789–1801	Succeeded by Sir Alured Clarke
Preceded by Lord Adam Gordon	Colonel of the 1st Regiment of Foot (Royal Scots); 1801–1820	Succeeded by Marquess of Huntly
Masonic offices
Preceded by The Duke of Atholl	Grand Master of the Antient Grand Lodge of England; 1813	Succeeded by The Duke of Sussex as Grand Master of the United; Grand Lodge of England
