= Portrait of Mrs. Theodore Atkinson Jr. =

Painting by John Singleton Copley

Mrs. Theodore Atkinson, Jr.
- Frances Deering Wentworth
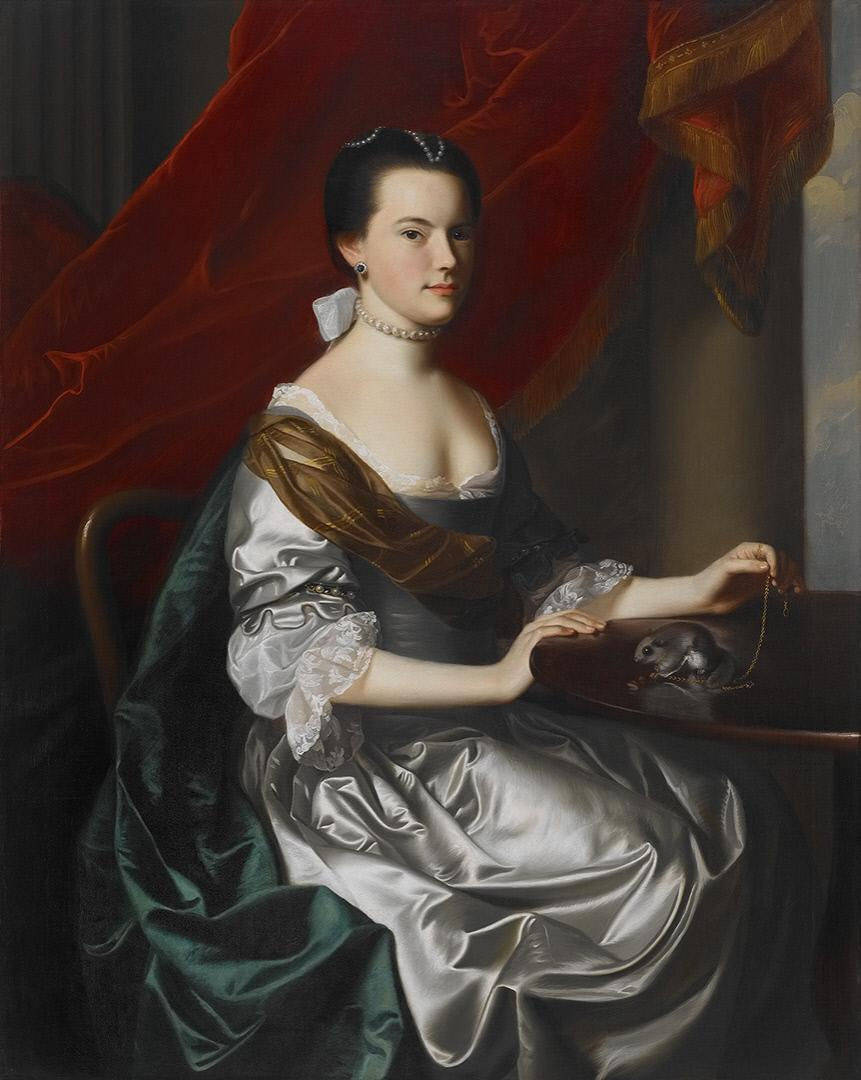
- Artist: John Singleton Copley
- Year: 1765 (approx.)
- Medium: Oil on canvas
- Subject: Frances Deering Wentworth
- Dimensions: 129.5 cm × 101.6 cm (51.0 in × 40.0 in)
- Location: Crystal Bridges Museum of American Art, Bentonville, Arkansas, United States

Mrs. Theodore Atkinson Jr. is an oil-on-canvas portrait painting completed in 1765 by the American artist John Singleton Copley. It is now housed in the Crystal Bridges Museum of American Art.

== Subject ==
Frances Deering Wentworth (1745–1813) was born into a wealthy and well-connected family. Her parents were Samuel Wentworth and Elizabeth Deering. When she was a young teenager, she had fallen in love with her first cousin, John Wentworth. However, he was too invested in establishing his career, and he left America to go to London. In London he managed his family's business. Back in America, Frances was 16 and fell in love with another one of her first cousins, Theodore Atkinson. They wed on May 13, 1762 and moved into their new home in 1765 in Portsmouth. During this time, Theodore commissioned John Singleton Copley to paint a portrait of his wife to display in their home.

In 1767, John Wentworth made his triumphant return to the American colonies. He was well-established and was now the governor of New Hampshire. Theodore had been in poor health for quite some time and it was rumored that Frances and John, both still in love, were having an affair. Theodore died on October 28, 1769, and a burial followed. Fueling the rumors, Frances and John wed the week following Theodore's death. At the time, Frances wedding shortly after her husband's death was the talk of the town and continued to be for some time. In Harriett Elizabeth Prescott Spofford's 1871 book New England Legends, she wrote:

“On one day Theodore breathed his last. His burial took place on the following Wednesday; by the Governor’s order all the bells in town were tolled, flags were hung at half-mast, and minute-guns were fired from the fort and from the ships-of-war in the harbor. On Sunday the weeping widow, clad in crapes, listened in church to the funeral eulogies; on Monday her affliction was mitigated; on Tuesday all the fingers of the seamstresses of the country roundabout were flying; and on the next Sunday, in the white satins and jewels and fardingales [hooped skirts] of a bride, she walked up the aisle the wife of Governor Wentworth.”

They remained in New Hampshire with John as governor. The New Hampshire towns of Deering and Francestown were named after her through John's orders. On June 13, 1775, the brink of the American Revolutionary War, the Wentworths fled New Hampshire for England. Eventually they settled in Halifax, Nova Scotia, with John as lieutenant governor. Accustomed to America and England, Frances supposedly hated her life in Nova Scotia, and had an affair with Prince William. When John found out about the affair, he was not upset with her, but he did write to King George III, William's father, and William was called back to England.

== Painting ==
John Singleton Copley is often regarded as the best portraitist in the American colonies. He received many commissions, among them this commission by Theodore Atkinson Jr. Copley painted this portrait of Frances Deering Wentworth when she was 19 years old, and two years after her marriage to Theodore Atkinson Jr. In the painting she is dressed in the height of fashion with her tight bodice of grey-blue satin. She wears a pearl choker, which accents the tiny pearls woven into her hair. One hand grips the edge of the table while the other hand holds the gold chained leash to her pet flying squirrel. In colonial America the flying squirrel was kept as a domesticated pet by the elite. The placement of the flying squirrel in the young wife's portrait highlights her role as wife and colonist.

== Provenance ==
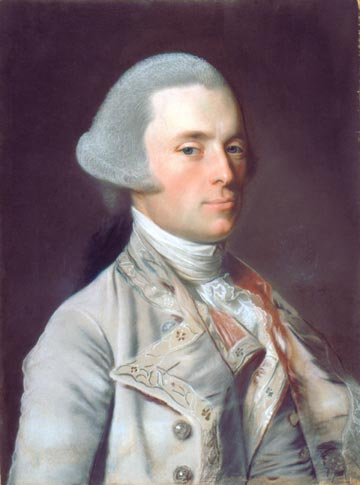
John Wentworth by John Singleton Copley

In 1762, Theodore Atkinson Jr. (1737–69) wed Frances Deering Wentworth, the sitter of this portrait. Atkinson commissioned John Singleton Copley, who had painted other portraits for his family, to paint a portrait of his new wife. In 1769, Atkinson perished from consumption, and the portrait went to Atkinson's father, Theodore, Sr. (1697–1779). When Theodore Atkinson, Sr. died in 1779, the painting was bequest to George King Atkinson (d. 1788), a cousin. The painting passed to William King (1765–1820), a nephew of George King Atkinson. His daughter, Frances Atkinson Freeman (b. 1797) inherited the painting in 1820. For decades the painting had been passed from family member to family member, but Frances Atkinson Freeman sold the painting in 1872.

The painting was bought by John Fisher Sheafe (1805–82) for his brother-in-law, James Lenox. Lenox was a wealthy American philanthropist, bibliophile, and art collector. He ultimately founded Lenox Library for the public to use his books and see his art collection. The Lenox Library was demolished and the Frick Collection was built by Henry Clay Frick. Upon demolition of the Lenox Library, in 1876, the books and artwork of the Lenox Library were donated along with the contents of the Tilden Trust and Astor Library to form the New York Public Library. The New York Public Library lent it to the Museum of Fine Arts, Boston in 1938 for their John Singleton Copley exhibition. It is listed as no. 7 in the catalogue.

In turn the New York Public Library auctioned off the painting as lot 4 at Sotheby's on November 30, 2005. The painting was bought by Crystal Bridges Museum. At the same auction, the Crystal Bridges Museum also bought other works that once resided in the collections of the Lenox Library and New York Public Library, including Portrait of Marquis de Lafayette and Gilbert Stuart's George Washington (The Constable-Hamilton Portrait).

== Related works ==
Earlier in 1757, Theodore Atkinson Jr. had commissioned John Singleton Copley to paint his portrait. When Atkinson Jr. was alive, his portrait and this 1765 portrait of Frances Deering Wentworth likely hung together. In April 2017, the paintings were reunited and displayed together for the first time in more than a century at the Crystal Bridges Art Museum.
