= Sir John Wentworth, 1st Baronet =

British colonial governor of New Hampshire (1737–1820)

Sir John Wentworth Bart
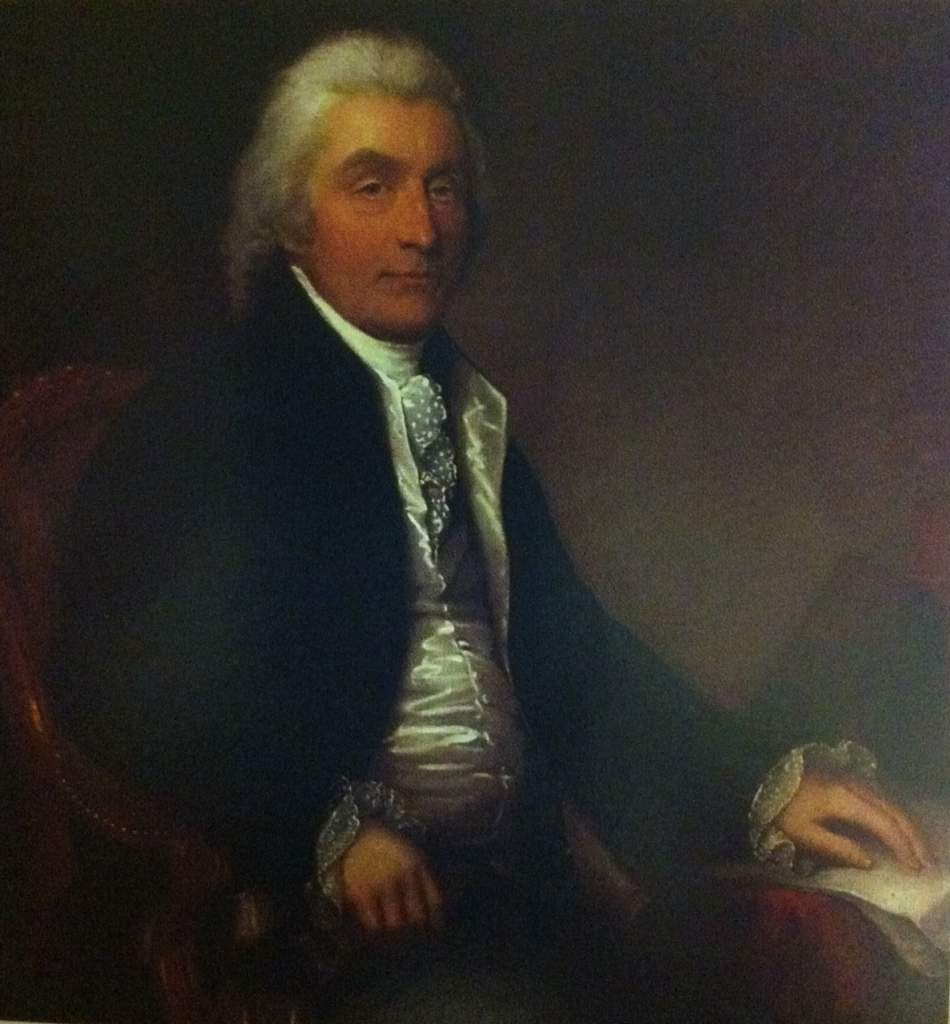
- Wentworth by Robert Field, (Government House (Nova Scotia))

Governor of the Province of New Hampshire
- In office 1767–1775
- Preceded by: Benning Wentworth
- Succeeded by: Meshech Weare (as Governor of New Hampshire)

Lieutenant-Governor of the Province of Nova Scotia
- In office 1792–1808
- Monarch: George III
- Preceded by: John Parr
- Succeeded by: Sir George Prevost

Personal details
- Born: 9 August 1737 Portsmouth, New Hampshire
- Died: 8 April 1820 (aged 82) Halifax, Nova Scotia
- Spouse: Frances Atkinson

Sir John Wentworth, 1st Baronet (9 August 1737 – 8 April 1820) was the British colonial governor of New Hampshire at the time of the American Revolution. He was later also Lieutenant-Governor of Nova Scotia. He is buried in the crypt of St. Paul's Church in Halifax.

== Early years ==
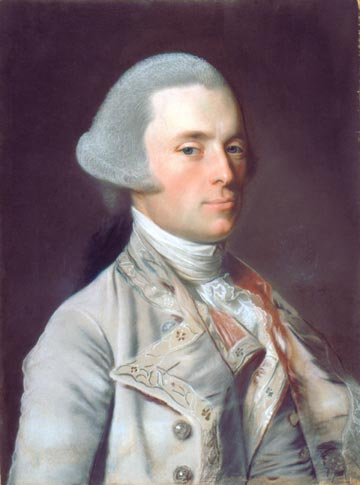
Wentworth by John Singleton Copley

Wentworth was born in Portsmouth, New Hampshire, on 9 August 1737. His ancestry went back to some of the earliest settlers of the Province of New Hampshire, and he was a grandson of John Wentworth, who served as the province's lieutenant governor in the 1720s, a nephew of Governor Benning Wentworth, and a descendant of "Elder" William Wentworth. His father Mark was a major landowner and merchant in the province, and his mother, Elizabeth Rindge Wentworth, was also from the upper echelons of New Hampshire society. In 1751, he enrolled in Harvard College, receiving a bachelor's degree in 1755 and a master's degree in 1758. During his time at Harvard, he was a classmate and became a close friend of future Founding Father and President of the United States John Adams.

In 1759, the young Wentworth made his first significant investment, joining a partnership in the purchase and development of land in the Lake Winnipesaukee area. Wentworth sat on a committee of partners that oversaw the settlement of the community, which the investors named Wolfeboro. In 1763, his father sent him to London to act on behalf of his merchant interests. Based on his father's introductions, he was soon mingling with the upper levels of British society. Among the connections he made was one with the Marquess of Rockingham, a distant relative (although neither was apparently aware of this) and a leading Whig politician. In 1765, Wentworth, still in London, was appointed by the province as one of its agents. That same year Rockingham became Prime Minister and led the repeal of the hated Stamp Act.

Wentworth's uncle Benning had spent many years of his governorship lining his pockets by selling land grants to the west of the Connecticut River, territory to which the province held a dubious claim. In 1764, the Lords of Trade ruled that New Hampshire's western border was at the Connecticut River, decisively awarding the territory (the future state of Vermont) to the Province of New York. The governor, however, refused to resign, leading the Lords of Trade to consider his recall. Wentworth interceded, and convinced them to allow his uncle the dignity of resigning in his nephew's favor.

In August 1766, he was commissioned as Governor and vice admiral of New Hampshire, and Surveyor General of the King's Woods in North America. Before he returned to North America he was awarded a Doctorate of Common Law by Oxford University. After a difficult crossing he arrived at Charleston, South Carolina in March 1767, where he proceeded to make the first major survey of the forests of Georgia and the Carolinas on behalf of the crown.

== Governor of New Hampshire ==
Under Wentworth's administration the growing province was divided into five counties to distribute administration and judicial functions to communities remote from Portsmouth. Wentworth was responsible for naming them, choosing names of current British leaders (including Rockingham), but also named Strafford County after one of his distant relatives, Thomas Wentworth, 1st Earl of Strafford.

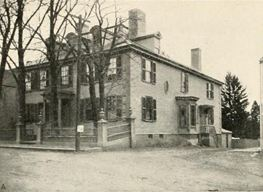
The Wentworth House was built by Mark Hunking Wentworth, and occupied by his son, Gov. John Wentworth, until he left New Hampshire after a cannon was pointed at the front door by revolutionaries

He also began the process of developing roads between the major population centers of the province, which had grown around the coast and the Merrimack and Connecticut Rivers. Although the provincial assembly was reluctant to fund new roads, Wentworth used quitrents collected on recently issued land grants to pay for the work. In 1771, he reported having constructed more than 200 miles (320 km) of roads at a cost of £500. The same year he convinced the assembly to appropriate £100 for surveyor Samuel Holland to produce the first detailed high-quality map of the province.

Wentworth was ironically responsible for significant improvements to the provincial militia organization. When he arrived, the militia consisted of about 10,000 men, who were by his report "badly accoutred and scarcely at all disciplined". He expanded the militia, adding 1,600 men and three regiments to the force, and regularly attended regimental reviews.

Although Wentworth was successful in keeping New Hampshire from implementing harsh boycotts in response to the Townshend Acts, he was clearly troubled by both colonial resistance to acts of Parliament and by the introduction of troops into Boston in 1768. He wrote to Rockingham that the troop movement was likely to be problematic, and that government and other reforms were more likely to succeed. New Hampshire businessmen were eventually pressured into adopting a boycott of British goods when Massachusetts businessmen threatened to suspend trade with them.

After the Boston Tea Party in late 1773 further inflamed tensions in New England, Wentworth successfully defused the threat of similar action in Portsmouth. After issuing careful instructions to the master of a ship arriving with a consignment of tea, Wentworth departed Portsmouth for Dover. During his absence the tea was landed and stored in the Portsmouth customs house. This removed the possibility of the tea being dumped as it had been in Boston, but the townspeople were still opposed to its presence. A committee of Portsmouth merchants negotiated its safe passage to Halifax, Nova Scotia, and the tea was safely transported through the town and reembarked on a ship.

Wentworth's popularity in the province began to fall as tensions continued to rise in neighboring Massachusetts. When the port of Boston was closed as punishment for the Tea Party, Massachusetts Governor Thomas Gage found it increasingly difficult to find workers willing to support the military (despite rampant unemployment caused by the port closure). He therefore asked Wentworth to assist in the procurement of carpenters in New Hampshire to build barracks for the troops. When his secretive methods to do so were exposed and publicized, local revolutionary committees denounced him as an "enemy to the community". Although he intuited that the arrival of Paul Revere on 13 December 1774, was likely to cause trouble, he was unable to prevent the local militia, now effectively under control of the revolutionary committees, from marching on Fort William and Mary the next day and seizing the provincial armaments and gunpowder. Wentworth had warned the garrison before the event, and called for naval support afterward, but it arrived too late to be of use.

He eventually asked for further reinforcements but received none, and realized that any attempt to arrest the ringleaders of the rebellion would likely result in an uprising. He organized a small force of trusted men to act as guards of his person and property, and during early 1775 pressure on the province's Loyalists was prompting some of them to flee to the safety of the British Army presence in Boston. Despite the opening of hostilities with the Battles of Lexington and Concord on 19 April (after which numerous New Hampshire militia went south to join the Siege of Boston), Wentworth convened the provincial assembly in late May. Composed primarily of rebel sympathizers, it refused to consider the Conciliatory Resolution proposed by Prime Minister Lord North to defuse the crisis. Wentworth therefore prorogued the assembly, hoping that a delay would favorably change the atmosphere. It did not; on 30 May, rebel militia began occupying and fortifying Portsmouth. Captain Andrew Barclay of HMS Scarborough further exacerbated tensions by impressing local fishermen and seizing supplies for use by the troops in Boston. Wentworth managed to defuse the situation by convincing Barclay to release the fishermen.

On 13 June 1775, after his house was surrounded by a mob of armed men seeking to arrest a Loyalist militia officer, Wentworth and his family fled to Fort William and Mary, which was under the guns of the Scarborough. Conditions continued to deteriorate, and Wentworth boarded the Scarborough and sailed for Boston on 23 August. After sending his family to England, he remained in the city until it was evacuated to Halifax in March 1776. He remained with the fleet until New York City was captured in September 1776, and finally sailed to England in early 1778. The New Hampshire government established after his departure seized most of his property, but specially reserved to the family portraits and furniture from the Portsmouth mansion.

== Surveyor General of the King's Woods ==
Wentworth had hopes of being appointed Governor of Nova Scotia, replacing Francis Legge. In March 1782, Lord North's ministry fell and the King called on Rockingham and the Earl of Shelburne to form a new government and negotiate peace with the US Congress. Rockingham had in fact promised him the position and presented him to the King, who thanked Wentworth for his efforts to preserve royal government in New Hampshire. However, three months later Rockingham died, and Shelburne was free to appoint his own supporters, so the governorship went to John Parr. Worse yet, Wentworth's office of Surveyor General of the King's Woods was eliminated as an economy measure. This was the low point of Wentworth's fortunes. All he could look forward to, like most Loyalists, was compensation for his losses in the former colonies and a small pension. However, Shelburne's ministry fell in April 1783, and the Duke of Portland, one of Rockingham's former supporters, became the new minister of the treasury. Wentworth lobbied successfully to have his surveyor-generalship restored, and he returned to Halifax in the summer of that year. His wife, Frances, followed him in 1784.

The office of Surveyor General of the King's Woods had been regarded as a sinecure by most of its previous holders, but Wentworth took the job very seriously. The government had seen the forests of North America as an inexhaustible resource of timber for the construction of ships, buildings, wharves, and other purposes. But Wentworth was far-sighted enough to see that the pressure of human settlement was literally chipping away at the old-growth forests. In particular he was aware of the enormous demand by the Royal Navy for mast timber, the tall, straight pines that were suitable for masts, booms, and other rigging on sailing ships. And given that Britain had just lost about half of its forest lands in North America, he was determined that, for the defense of the realm, the remainder of the choice trees would be protected.

For the next seven years Wentworth travelled through the woods of eastern British North America, displaying endurance and courage that were remarkable for a man who in 1783 was forty-six years old. He could truthfully declare that his journeys were so physically demanding he could never find any man who could stay with him through a whole trip. The timber reservations John Wentworth made between 1783 and 1791 not only provided the Royal Navy at a critical time with the masts to defeat Napoleon, but also laid the basis of future crown land policies in what is now Canada.

Upon his return from his travels to Halifax in Dec. 1786, he received a letter from James Monk assuring him that he would soon be appointed lieutenant-governor of either Nova Scotia or New Brunswick. In the end, after a complicated series of appointments and reassignments, Wentworth was left the odd man out.

== Frances Wentworth and Prince William ==
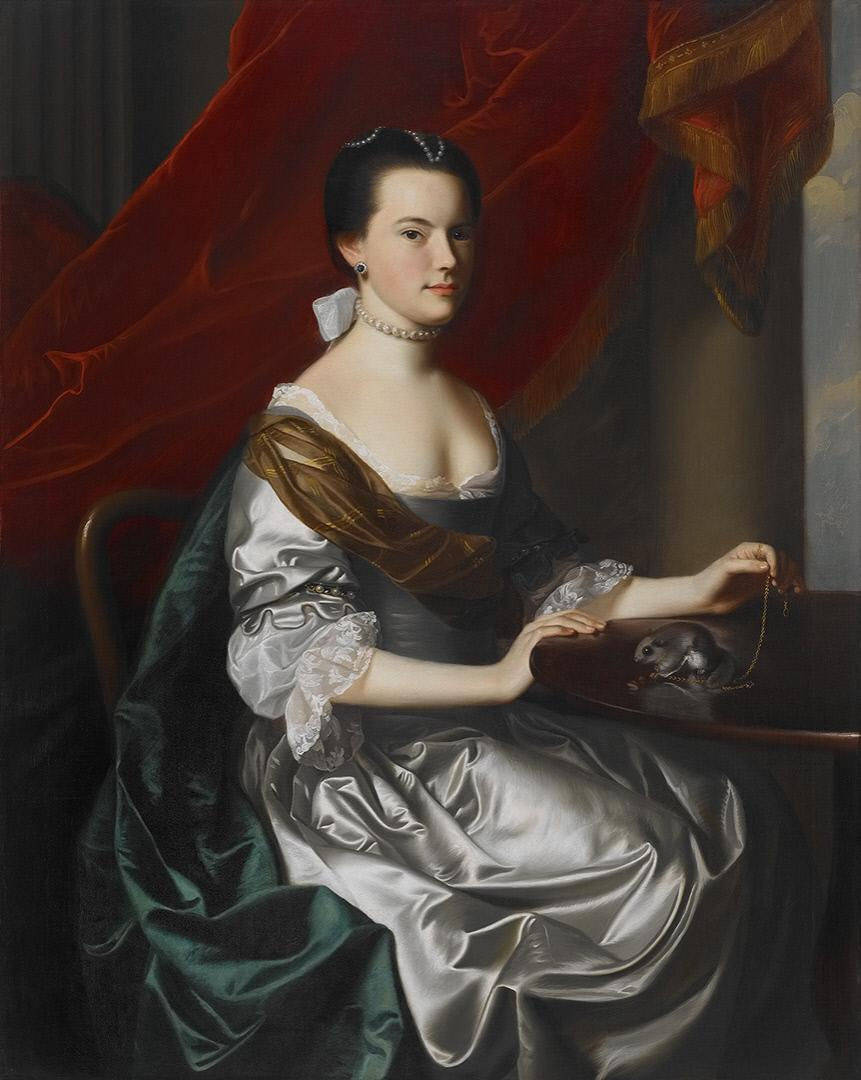
Frances Wentworth, by John Singleton Copley, 1765. At the time of this painting, she was Mrs. Theodore Atkinson.

Frances Wentworth had been unhappy since her arrival in Nova Scotia. As ambitious as her husband, she took his and her misfortunes very hard. She also missed the sophisticated lifestyle she had enjoyed in England, missed her son who was being schooled in England, and was distressed by John's long absences.

Prince William Henry, the third son of King George III, made his first visit to Halifax in late 1786, while John Wentworth was away in Cape Breton. The Prince, later known as the "Sailor King", was at that time in command of HMS Pegasus, and was already known as a hard drinker and womanizer, much to the distress of his royal father. Frances arranged to be introduced to Prince William. At the age of forty-one (the Prince was twenty-one), she was widely considered to be still quite beautiful, dressed at the height of fashion, and retained the sophistication she had gained in England. It is widely believed that shortly after this she became Prince William's mistress. The affair was renewed when the Prince made a second visit to Halifax in the following year.

John learned of the affair, but did not raise any public scandal; Frances described him in a letter as the "most diffident of men." A scandal would not have furthered the interests of either of them. Nevertheless, he made his displeasure known to the King, most likely via the Prince's superior officer, Admiral Herbert Sawyer. Prince William soon departed for Québec.

== Lieutenant Governor of Nova Scotia ==
Government House as it appeared during the residence of the Wentworths.

The Wentworths sailed to England in the early summer of 1791, to try to sort out their deepening financial disorders. While there, news came that Lt. Gov. Parr had died. The couple immediately began lobbying for John to get the vacated post, and while his position appeared weak, Henry Dundas decided in his favor based on his experience. Wentworth became the first civilian governor of Nova Scotia.

During the previous decade hostility between the Planters and the newly arrived Loyalists nearly crippled the government. As well, the cost of settling the Loyalists had plunged the colony into debt. As a Loyalist himself, Wentworth favored them for higher offices, while being more even-handed with the distribution of lower offices. This began a Loyalist ascendancy that continued well into the 19th century. He stabilized the colony's finances by introducing an excise duty on all imports; by the end of 1793 even some of the principal of the debt had been paid off.

In April 1793, news arrived that war had broken out between Britain and revolutionary France. All but 200 men of the colony's garrison were sent to the West Indies, and Wentworth was instructed to call out the militia and to begin recruiting a provincial regiment of 600 men (later 800) for home defence, of which he was to be colonel. He set about the task with vigour, in spite of having no military experience. Despite difficulties, the Royal Nova Scotia Regiment was brought up to a useful strength within a year and served until disbanded with the coming of peace in 1802.

In May 1794, another royal prince arrived at Halifax, the fourth son of the King, Prince Edward, Duke of Kent, along with his mistress, Julie, Madame de Saint-Laurent. Edward had been appointed C-in-C of the King's forces in Nova Scotia and New Brunswick. Wentworth was pleased by this, as he had quarreled with the previous commander, Maj. Gen. Ogilvie. The Wentworths were also pleased to welcome Julie, which gratified the Prince, as she had been shunned by society in Québec, where he had been previously posted. The two couples formed a lasting friendship, which led to Wentworth offering the Prince the use of his small estate outside of town, which is today known as Princes Lodge. On a more practical level, Prince Edward's influence brought funding for the fortifications of Halifax and much of the rest of the colony. He also gifted Halifax with its Town Clock, which he helped to design. The influx of government funding for the war effort led to prosperity throughout Nova Scotia. Simeon Perkins of Liverpool outfitted a privateer ship named after Wentworth's son, the Charles Mary Wentworth, which netted 19,000 pounds sterling on her second cruise.

The Wentworths had been displeased with the state of their residence since John had come to the office. The building (on the site now occupied by Province House) was a wood-frame construction built in 1758. Nearly 40 years later it was generally run-down and not large enough for major occasions. Beginning in 1796, Wentworth obtained funding from the Legislature for an entirely new building, built of stone, which would be both a residence and a public space, a few blocks to the southwest. Government House, as it became known, eventually went three times over its initial budget, and the Wentworths did not finally move in until 1805, when the interior was still not finished. This residence still serves as home to Nova Scotia's Lieutenant Governors today.

Wentworth also improved and expanded roads, increased support to Nova Scotia's poverty stricken Mi'kmaq people and set up the first rescue station on Sable Island. A less successful and costly initiative was a settlement of Maroons from Jamaica who were instead resettled in Sierra Leone. Wentworth initially enjoyed good relations with the legislature but in later years fell into an escalating confrontation with the informal leader of the country party, William Cottnam Tonge. The conflict, largely over which branch of government should allocate funds for road-building, grew into a constitutional struggle between the governor-in-council and the House of Assembly, controlled by Tonge. Wentworth assisted and drew support from powerful Halifax merchants but lost support elsewhere. With the war with France renewed in 1803 and conflict with the United States intensifying, London abruptly replaced Wentworth in 1808 with a military governor, General George Prevost.

Wentworth was knighted and awarded a baronetcy in 1795, and granted a coat of arms by the College of Arms, London, England, 16 May 1795. He also served as Grand Master of the Freemasons. He retired as governor of Nova Scotia in 1808 on a pension of 6500 dollars.

== Family and legacy ==
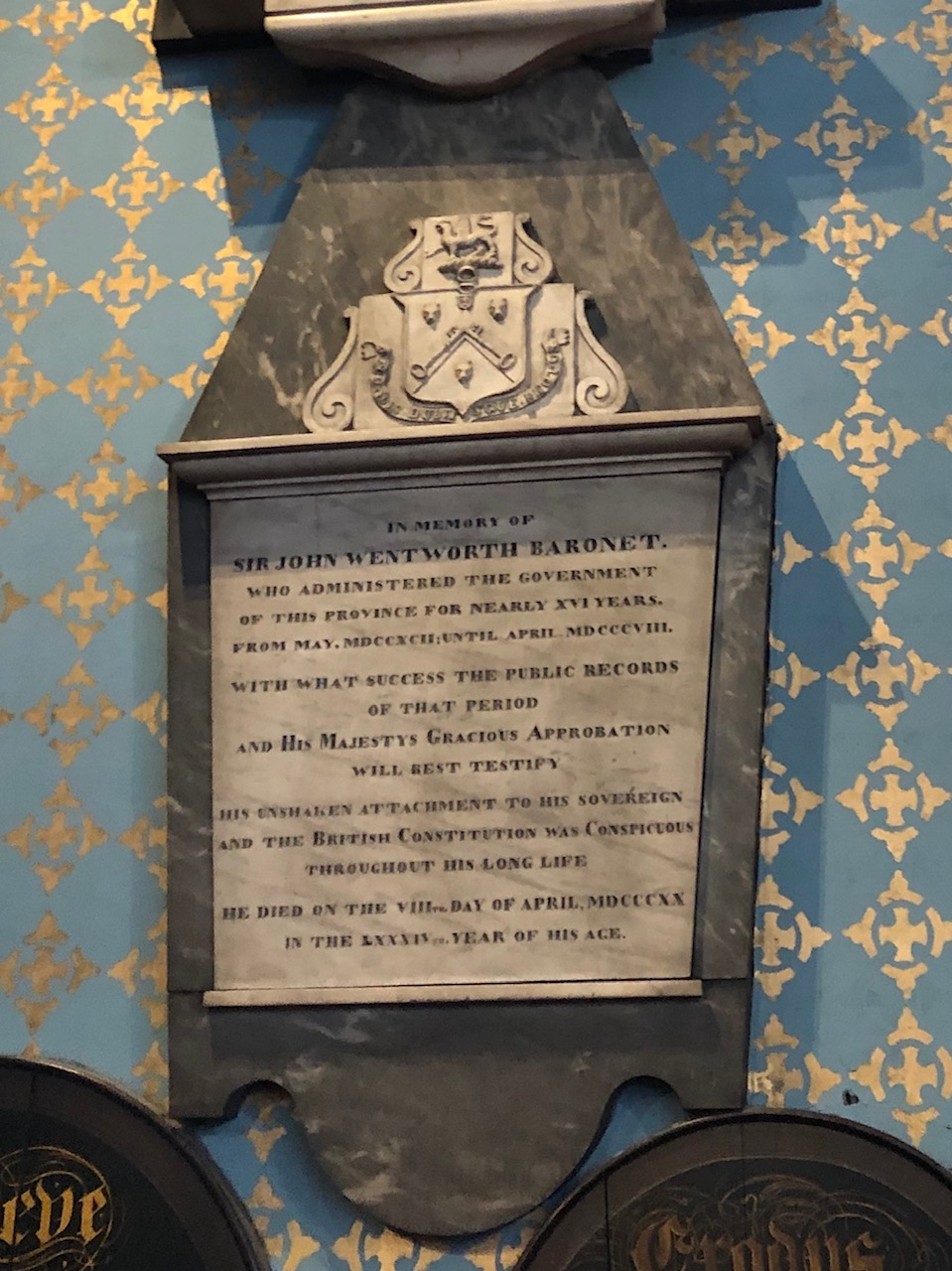
Sir John Wentworth, St. Paul's Church (Halifax), Nova Scotia

John Wentworth and Frances Deering Wentworth were cousins. Frances had first married Theodore Atkinson, Junior, Secretary of the Colony of New Hampshire, who died at Portsmouth, 28 October 1769. John and Frances married two weeks later. Her name is preserved in the towns of Francestown, Deering and Wentworth. John's name is preserved in the community of Wentworth and the surrounding area. The couple had one son, Charles Mary Wentworth, who succeeded to the baronetcy. The son, who served as a member of the Legislative Council in Nova Scotia, died without issue in 1844, extinguishing the baronetcy.

Frances died at Sunninghill, Berkshire, England, 14 February 1813, aged 68 and buried at St. James Churchyard in Piccadilly, Westminster, Greater London, England. John died at Halifax, Nova Scotia, on 8 April 1820, aged 84. He was buried in St. Paul's Church, where a tablet exists to his memory.

Government House remains the official residence of Nova Scotia's Lieutenant-Governors.

The Governor's Lady, by Thomas H. Raddall, is a novel based on the lives of John and Frances Wentworth.

Lieutenant Governor Wentworth employed a number of Maroons on his farm and in his household, as well as a few at Government House. Wentworth kept a Maroon mistress. They had at least one child, George Wentworth Colley (1804–1893). Wentworth's farm was located near the foot of Long Lake.

== See also ==
- New Hampshire Historical Marker No. 53: Wentworth Estate
- New Hampshire Historical Marker No. 116: College Road
- New Hampshire Historical Marker No. 123: The Governor's Road
- New Hampshire Historical Marker No. 186: Sawyer's Rock
- New Hampshire Route 109, part of which is known as the Governor Wentworth Highway

== Notes ==
Political offices
Preceded by Benning Wentworth	Governor of the Province of New Hampshire; 1767–1775	Vacant abandoned in American Revolutionary War Title next held by Meshech Weare as President of the State of New Hampshire
Preceded by Sir Richard Bulkeley (acting)	Lieutenant-Governor of Nova Scotia; 1792–1808	Succeeded by Sir George Prevost
Baronetage of Great Britain
New creation	Baronet (of Parlut); 1795–1820	Succeeded by Charles Mary Wentworth
