= Princes Lodge, Nova Scotia =

Princes Lodge
- Neighbourhood
- Princes Lodge
- Location in Canada
- Country: Canada
- Province: Nova Scotia
- Neighbourhood: April 1, 1996

Government
  - Type: Regional Municipality
  - Mayor: Mike Savage
  - Governing body: Halifax Regional Council

Area
  - Total: 2.03 km^{2} (0.78 sq mi)
- Demonym: Haligonian
- Time zone: UTC−04:00 (AST)
  - Summer (DST): UTC−03:00 (ADT)
- Postal code span: B0J, B3A to B4G
- Area codes: 782, 902
- GNBC Code: CBUCG
- Website: www.halifax.ca

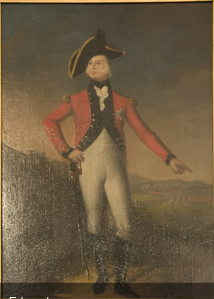
Prince Edward, Duke of Kent and Strathearn By William J. Weaver, Province House (Nova Scotia)

Princes Lodge is a 500-acre (200-hectare) neighbourhood located on the shore of Bedford Basin, between the communities of Rockingham and Bedford in Nova Scotia, Canada within the Halifax Regional Municipality on the Bedford Highway (Trunk 2).

== History ==
Princes Lodge was named for the estate that Prince Edward, Duke of Kent resided in while in Halifax in from 1794 to 1800. In 1794, Prince Edward arrived to serve in Halifax as Commander-in-Chief of the King's forces in Nova Scotia and New Brunswick. He was accompanied by his French mistress Madame de Saint-Laurent. The Prince was often entertained by Sir John Wentworth, the Lieutenant-Governor of the colony, at his rural estate, the "Friar's Cell", as Wentworth called it, is an allusion to Shakespeare's Romeo and Juliet. The Prince liked it so much that Wentworth felt obliged to offer it to him during his stay in Halifax. Prince Edward accepted, and had the residence renovated into a two-storey (likely Palladian architecture mansion) and expanded, while also having the lands and gardens (with Chinese like pagodas) around the estate developed by a landscaper brought from England. The result was what is today Hemlock Ravine Park, 185 acres (0.75 km^{2}) with a heart-shaped pond known as Julie's Pond, constructed by order of the Prince in her honour.

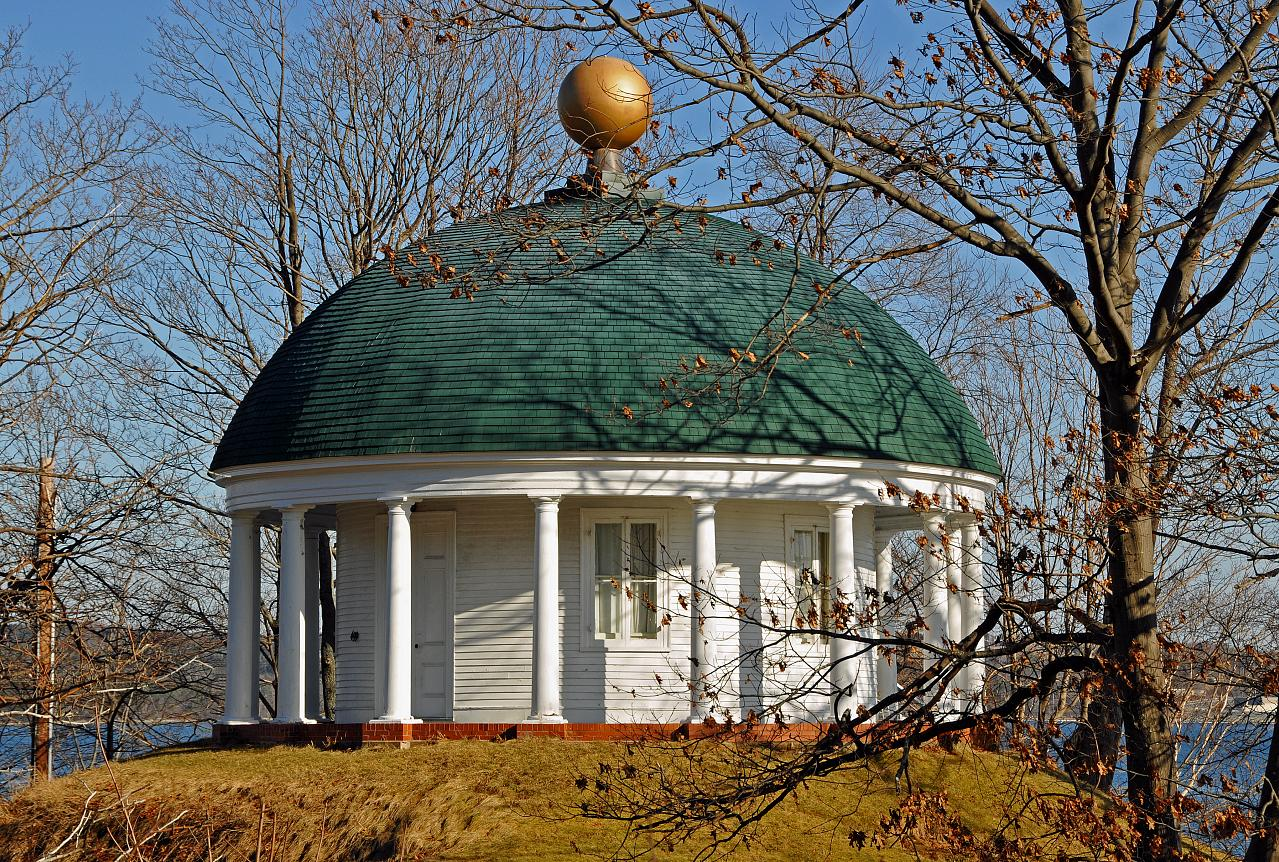
Music Room

The Wentworths resumed living in the Lodge when Prince Edward returned to the UK in 1798. Now called the Princes Lodge, it was here that Wentworth established the Rockingham Club in the former officer's barracks. After Wentworth's death, the estate was neglected. By 1870, in ruins, it was sold at auction and divided into building lots. All that remains of the original estate is the music room (Rotunda) less a foot bridge spanning over railway line, which the Nova Scotia Government acquired in 1959. It is a small, round music room that stands on a knoll overlooking the Bedford Basin.

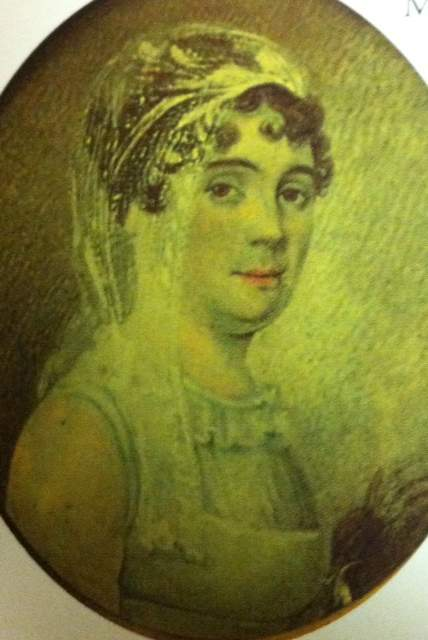
Madame de Saint-Laurent - Mistress of Prince Edward

== See also ==
- Parks and recreation in the Halifax Regional Municipality Hemlock Ravine Park
- Royal eponyms in Canada
