= Julie de Saint-Laurent =

French noble (1760–1830)

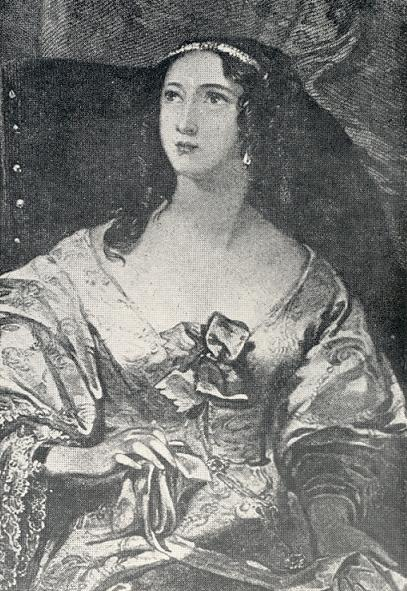
- Julie de Montgenêt de Saint-Laurent, 1800
- Born: Alphonsine-Thérèse-Bernardine-Julie de Montgenêt de Saint-Laurent; 30 September 1760; Besançon, France
- Died: 8 August 1830 (aged 69); Paris, France
- Burial place: Père Lachaise Cemetery, Paris
- Other names: Julie de Saint-Laurent; Thérèse-Bernardine Montgenêt
- Known for: Mistress of Prince Edward, Duke of Kent and Strathearn
- Spouse: Baron de Fortisson
- Parent(s): Jean-Claude Mongenêt; Jeanne-Claude Pussot

Alphonsine-Thérèse-Bernardine-Julie de Montgenêt de Saint-Laurent (30 September 1760 – 8 August 1830), often known as Julie de Saint-Laurent or Madame de Saint-Laurent, was a French baroness who was for almost 30 years the partner of Prince Edward, Duke of Kent and Strathearn.

== Life ==
Julie de Saint-Laurent was born on 30 September 1760 in Besançon, France, to Jean-Claude Mongenêt, a civil engineer, and Jeanne-Claude (Claudine) Pussot.

== Marriage ==
She married Jean Charles Andre de Mestre, Baron de Fortisson, a colonel in the French service.

During the French revolution, the couple along with their infant daughter Melanie fled to the safety of Geneva.

== Meeting the Duke of Kent ==
While in Geneva, Prince Edward, Duke of Kent and Strathearn, was introduced to the de Fortissons. Soon afterward, Julie and Edward became lovers. The Duke's father, King George III, enrolled Edward in the army and had him posted to Gibraltar, where Edward made arrangements for her to be smuggled so that they could be together. George III later found out about the affair, and so sent the Duke to Quebec City as colonel of the 7th Fusiliers. Humiliated, he at first refused to go, but in August 1791 arrived accompanied by his chatelaine, introduced as Julie de Saint-Laurent and reputed to be a widow.

Shortly after his arrival in Quebec, Prince Edward leased Judge Mabane's house for £90 per annum. Madame de Saint Laurent lived with him at the Duke of Kent House in Quebec City for three years before he was posted to Halifax, Nova Scotia, in 1794.

It has been claimed by several writers that she was secretly married to the Duke of Kent at a Roman Catholic church in Quebec. Recent scholarship (particularly by Mollie Gillen, who was granted access to the Royal Archive at Windsor Castle) has established that no children were born of the 27-year relationship between Prince Edward and Julie de Saint-Laurent; although many Canadian families and individuals (including the Nova Scotian soldier Sir William Fenwick Williams, 1st Baronet) have claimed descent from them, such claims can now be discounted in light of this new research.

For twenty-eight years Saint-Laurent presided over the Duke's household, as a local chronicler records, "with dignity and propriety". She is described as having been beautiful, clever, witty and accomplished. Many of her letters will be found in Anderson's The Life of Edward, Duke of Kent (Quebec: 1870). After the Duke's marriage in 1818 to the Dowager Princess of Leiningen, Saint-Laurent retreated to Paris where she lived out her days amongst her family and friends.

She died in 1830 and was buried with her sister, Jeanne-Beatrix, Comtesse de Jansac, at Père Lachaise Cemetery in Paris.

== Legacy ==
She has given her name to two roads and a pond in the neighborhood of Prince's Lodge in Bedford, Nova Scotia:

- Julie's Pond or The Heart Shaped Pond - a man-made body of water built on order by Prince Edward at the foot of Kent Road in what is now Hemlock Ravine Park
- St. Laurent Place - short residential road in Prince's Lodge, Nova Scotia
- Julie's Walk, Bedford - short residential road in Prince's Lodge, Nova Scotia
