= Marquis de Lafayette (Morse) =

Painting by Samuel Morse

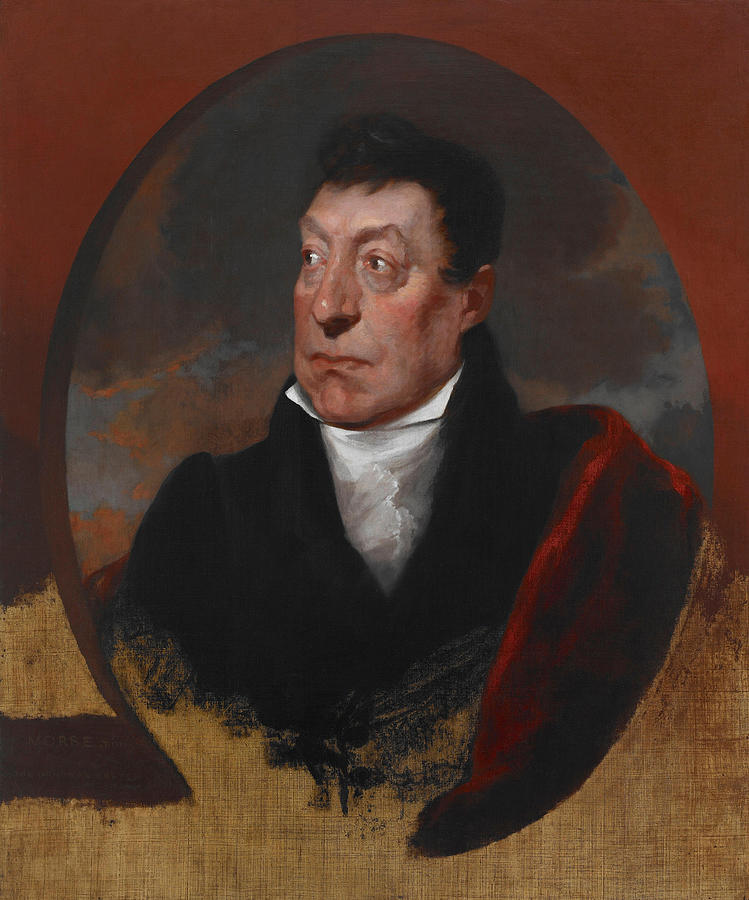
- Portrait of Lafayette
- Artist: Samuel F. B. Morse
- Year: 1825
- Medium: Oil on canvas
- Dimensions: 66.04 cm × 90.8 cm (26.00 in × 35.7 in)
- Location: Crystal Bridges Museum; Bentonville, Arkansas

Marquis de Lafayette (or Portrait of La Fayette) is an oil on canvas painting by Samuel Morse, from 1825. Mostly known for his invention of the telegraph, Morse was also an artist and a professor of painting and sculpture at the University of the City of New York.

== Painting ==
The painting is a loose and gestural bust-study rather than a finished work, a sketch for the 1826 full-length portrait of Lafayette that had been commissioned by the City of New York to commemorate Lafayette's role in the American Revolutionary War. The sketch focused on capturing a portrait of Lafayette during his brief visits to New York City from 1824–25. The majority of the painting was done in February 1825.

Morse had great respect for Lafayette, remarking "My feelings were almost too powerful for me... This is the man... who spent his youth, his fortune, and his time, to bring about (under Providence) our happy Revolution; the friend and companion of [George] Washington, terror of tyrants, the firm and consistent supporter of liberty, the man whose beloved name has rung from one end of the continent to the other, whom all flock to see, whom all delight to honor."

== Provenance ==
Once his full-length portrait was completed, Morse, having no compelling need for this sketch, gave it to Philip Hone (often called "The Honorable Philip Hone" by contemporaries), the Mayor of New York City. Morse likely gave it to Hone because he was in charge of the commission.

Upon Hone's death, an "Inventory of Paintings, Statuary, Medals, etc, the Property of the Late Philip Hone, to be sold at public auction" was taken, which included this painting. William H. Osborn, a railroad tycoon who was a patron of the arts and had a personal art collection, bought the painting at the April 28, 1852 auction.

Osborn gave the painting to the wealthy James Lenox in 1876. Like the majority of his art collection, the painting was displayed in Lenox's newly built Lenox Library, and was listed in the 1879, 1885, and 1892 catalogues. The 1879 Lenox Library Guide to the Paintings and Sculptures states that the painting was "Presented by William H. Osborn, November, 1876."

A few decades later the painting was donated to the New York Public Library, where it was displayed and periodically loaned out to other museums.

It sold at Sotheby's as lot 1 on November 30, 2005. The Crystal Bridges Museum bought it for US$1,360,000 (equivalent to $2,241,949 in 2025).

== Related works ==
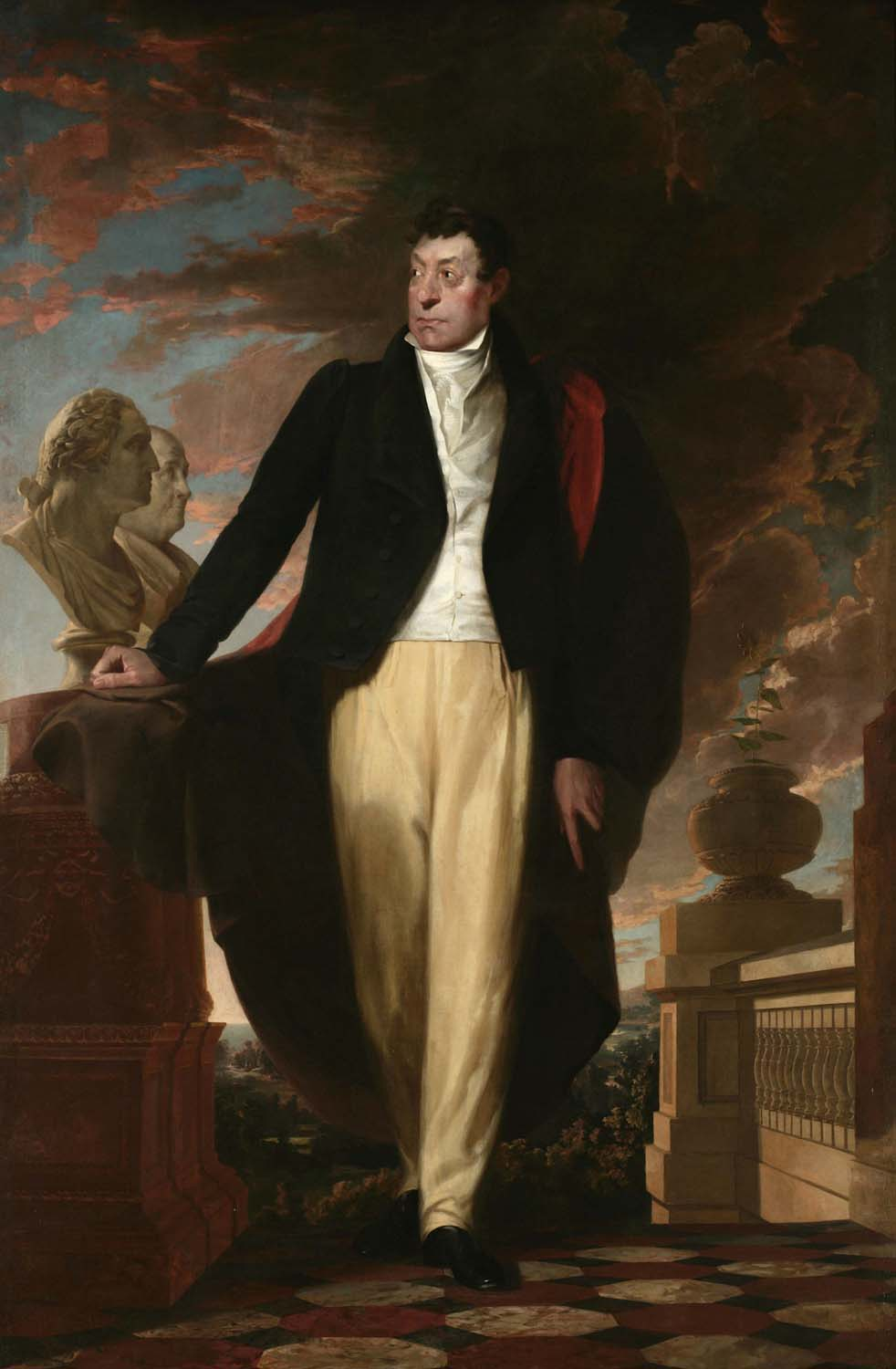
Portrait of Marquis de La Lafayette, 1826, oil on canvas, New York City Hall

The full-length portrait for which this work was a sketch is displayed in the City Hall Portrait Collection in New York City Hall.
