= Mollie Gillen =

Canadian/Australian writer

- Born: Kathleen Mollie Woolnough; 1 November 1908; Sydney, New South Wales, Australia
- Died: 31 January 2009 (aged 100); Toronto, Ontario, Canada
- Occupations: Historian, writer, author

Mollie Gillen AM (née Woolnough; 1 November 1908 – 31 January 2009) was an Australian historian, researcher, writer and novelist. Her work on the First Fleet, in The Search for John Small, First Fleeter and The Founders of Australia: a Biographical Dictionary of the First Fleet, explored the idea that many of the founding families of Australia were descended from the convict population, rather than those sent to guard them. Gillen's article "Maud Montgomery: The Girl Who Wrote Green Gables" instigated a new era in scholarship on Lucy Maud Montgomery.

== Early life and education ==
Mollie Gillen was born Mollie Woolnough in Sydney, New South Wales in Australia, the daughter of Dr. R. E. Woolnough and Bertha Grace Woolnough (née Youdale) in 1908.

When she was 10, her parents died within a few months of each other. Her father, who was a medical doctor, died of influenza due to tending many patients after World War I. Mollie grew up under the care of her grandparents. She was educated at Loreto Normanhurst and in 1930 graduated with a bachelor of arts from the University of Sydney. While working in London in the 1930s, she met her future husband, Orval John Gillen, a warrant officer with the Royal Canadian Air Force Headquarters Staff then stationed in England. They were married in London on 25 June 1940 and moved to Canada in 1941.

== Writing career ==
Gillen's writing career started in the 1950s. As a federal government information officer in Ottawa, she edited government journals. She was also active on the executive of the University Women's Club of Ottawa, serving as its first vice-president.

Mollie's first mystery novel, Star of Death, was published in England in 1960. Also her many short stories were published in various publications including The Sunday Evening Post.

In 1961, she moved to Toronto and eventually became associate editor and staff writer for the Canadian magazine Chatelaine. Mollie published numerous articles for this women's magazine, concerning social problems in the community.

Her research led her to write and publish many books on various topics important to Canada and Australia including: The Masseys: Founding Family (1965), The Prince and His Lady (1970), The Assassination of the Prime Minister (1972), The Wheel of Things: A Biography of L.M. Montgomery (1975), The Search for John Small (1985) and The Founders of Australia: A Biographical Dictionary of the First Fleet (1989).

In 1995, she received Hon.D. Litt. from her alma mater for her work on the First Fleet and the history of early Australia. She was made a Member of the Order of Australia (AM) in recognition of her contributions "to genealogy and to Australian historical research" in the 1995 Australia Day Honours.

=== Later life ===
Dr. Gillen lived in Dolphin Square in London for many years before returning to Toronto, Ontario, Canada. Dr. Gillen lived in a nursing home in Toronto, Ontario from 2002 until her death on 31 January 2009. She was survived by her daughter Barbara and sister Marjorie. Her husband Orval and son Ian both predeceased her.

== Publications ==
- A Star of Death (1960) — A thriller set in England and Australia.
- The Masseys: Founding Family (1965) — Enlarged from the three part series that won the President's Medal of the University of Western Ontario for the best article published in Canada in 1965 in the general article category.
- The Prince and His Lady: The Love Story of the Duke of Kent and Madame de St. Laurent (1970) — Published in England, Canada and the USA. It is the story of Prince Edward Augustus, later Duke of Kent and father of Queen Victoria, and his relationship with his French mistress Madame de St Laurent. Dr. Gillen received Her Majesty the Queen's gracious permission to work in the Royal Archives at Windsor Castle.
- Assassination of the Prime Minister: The Shocking Death of Spencer Perceval (1972) — An account of the murder in the House of Commons of the British Prime Minister Spencer Perceval in 1812. Dr. Gillen researched and used many original letters and papers in the British Library for writing this book.
- The Wheel of Things: A Biography of L. M. Montgomery (1975) — Dr. Gillen discovered over 40 of Lucy Maud Montgomery's letters to her pen-friend George Boyd MacMillan in Scotland and used them as the basis for her work. The letters were later published by Elizabeth Epperly and Francis W.P.Bolger.
- Royal Duke: Augustus Frederick, Duke of Sussex (1773–1843) (1976)
- The Search for John Small, First Fleeter (1985) — A study of an early Australian convict settler.
- The Founders of Australia: A Biographical Dictionary of the First Fleet (1989) — This is the work on the First Fleet that led to her honorary doctorate and being awarded the Order of Australia.
